= Podulaka =

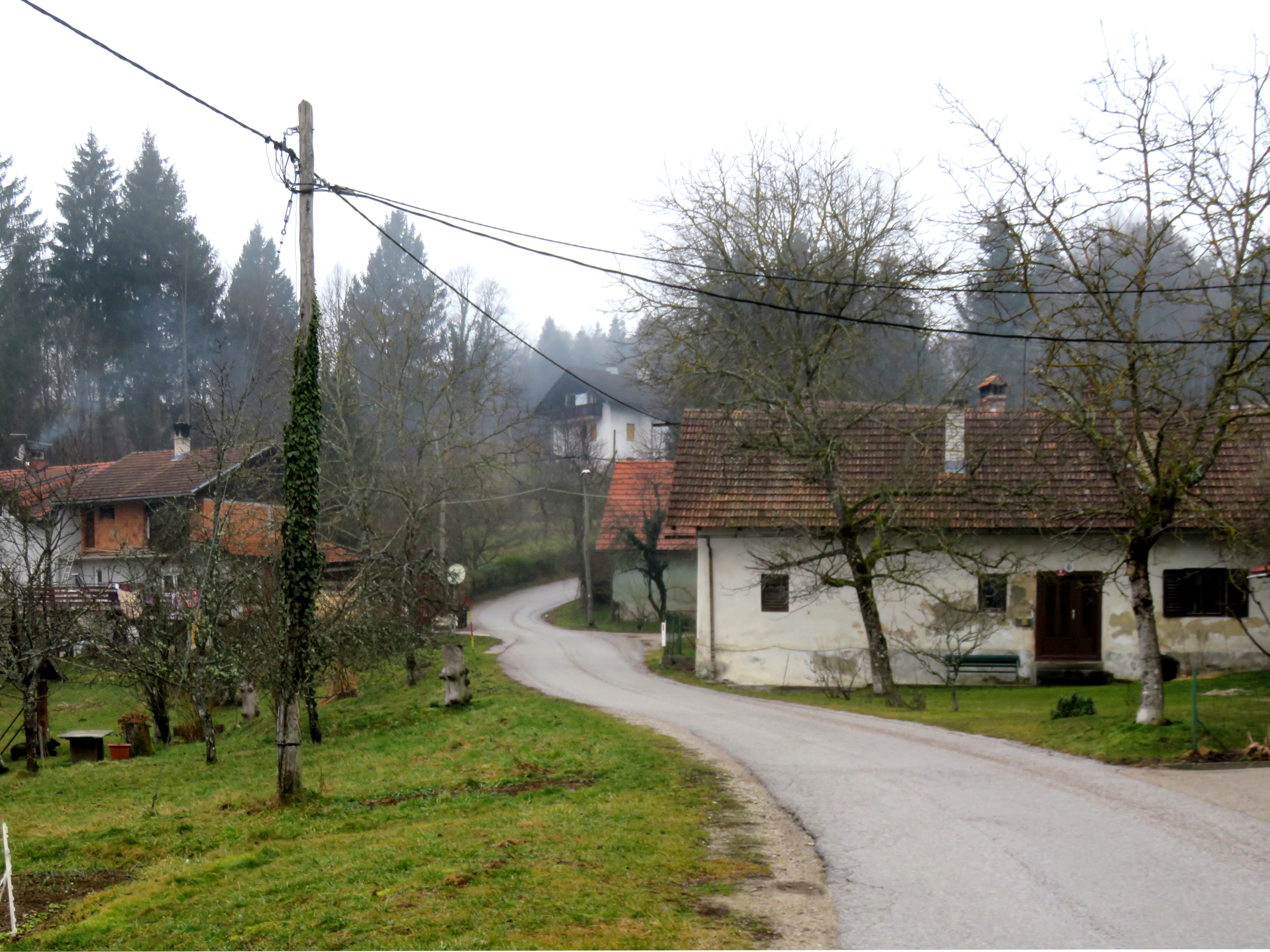

- Location in Slovenia
- Coordinates: 45°50′8.43″N 14°36′44.61″E
- Country: Slovenia
- Traditional region: Lower Carniola
- Statistical region: Central Slovenia
- Municipality: Velike Lašče

Area
  - Total: 0.35 km^{2} (0.14 sq mi)
- Elevation: 573 m (1,880 ft)

Population (2002)
  - Total: 36
- Postal code: 1315

Podulaka (pronounced [pɔˈduːlaka]) is a small settlement west of Velike Lašče in central Slovenia. The entire Municipality of Velike Lašče is part of the traditional Lower Carniola region and is now included in the Central Slovenia Statistical Region.
