= Bavdek =

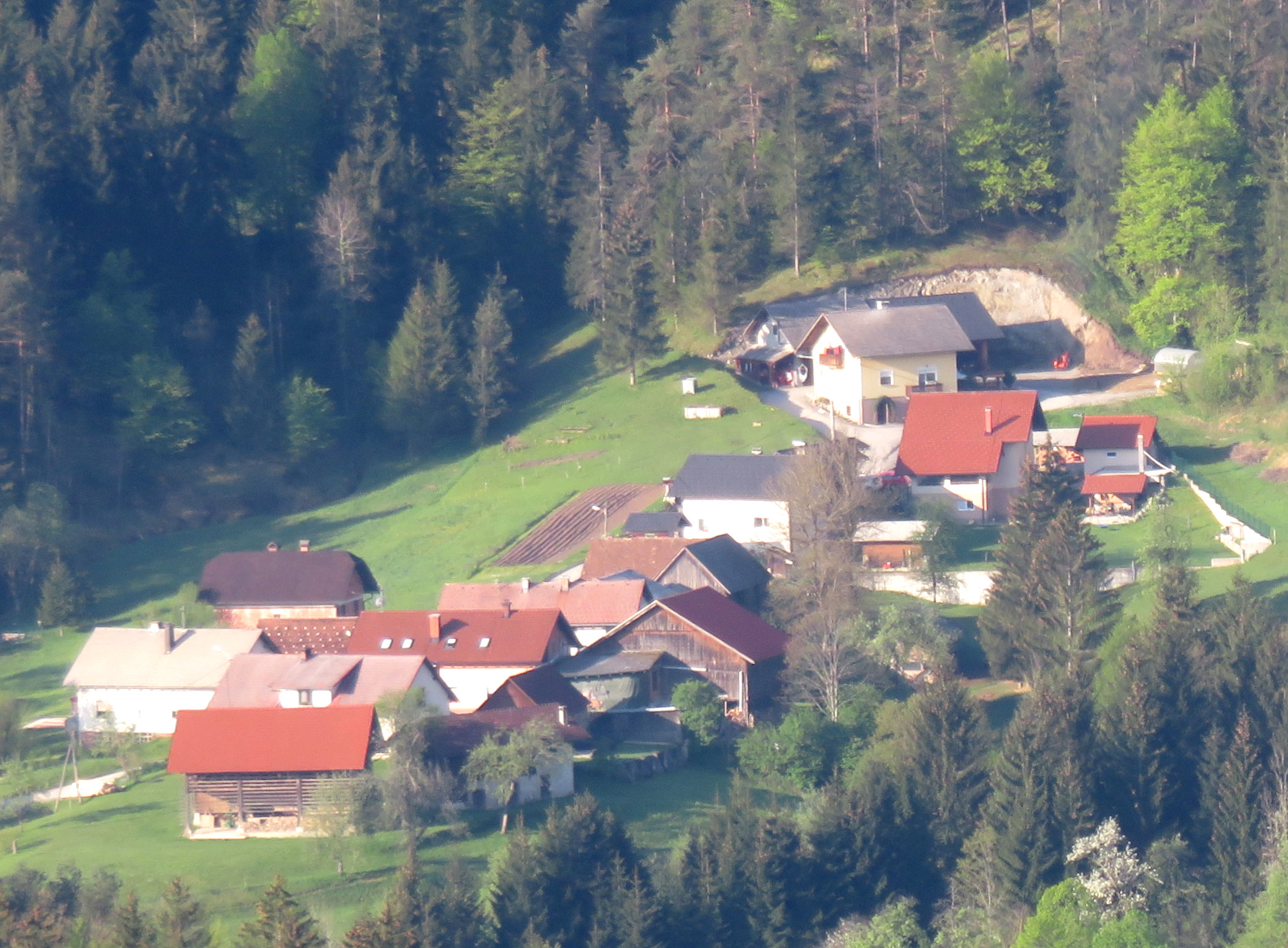

- Location in Slovenia
- Coordinates: 45°50′27.05″N 14°34′27.76″E
- Country: Slovenia
- Traditional region: Lower Carniola
- Statistical region: Central Slovenia
- Municipality: Velike Lašče

Area
  - Total: 0.72 km^{2} (0.28 sq mi)
- Elevation: 526.9 m (1,729 ft)

Population (2002)
  - Total: 25
- Postal code: 1314

Bavdek (pronounced [ˈbaːu̯dək], in older sources also Bavdki, German: Waudek) is a small settlement in the Municipality of Velike Lašče in Slovenia. Traditionally the area is part of Lower Carniola. It is now included in the Central Slovenia Statistical Region.
