= Veliki Ločnik =

- Location in Slovenia
- Coordinates: 45°54′4.13″N 14°36′10.04″E
- Country: Slovenia
- Traditional region: Lower Carniola
- Statistical region: Central Slovenia
- Municipality: Velike Lašče

Area
  - Total: 2.56 km^{2} (0.99 sq mi)
- Elevation: 561.8 m (1,843 ft)

Population (2002)
  - Total: 98
- Postal code: 1311

Veliki Ločnik (pronounced [ˈʋeːliki lɔtʃˈniːk] or [ˈʋeːliki ˈloːtʃnik]; German: Großlotschnik) is a settlement north of Turjak in the Municipality of Velike Lašče in central Slovenia. The entire municipality is part of the traditional region of Lower Carniola and is now included in the Central Slovenia Statistical Region.

A Roman-period burial ground has been found at a site near the settlement, but the extent of the cemetery has yet to be determined.
