= Poznikovo =

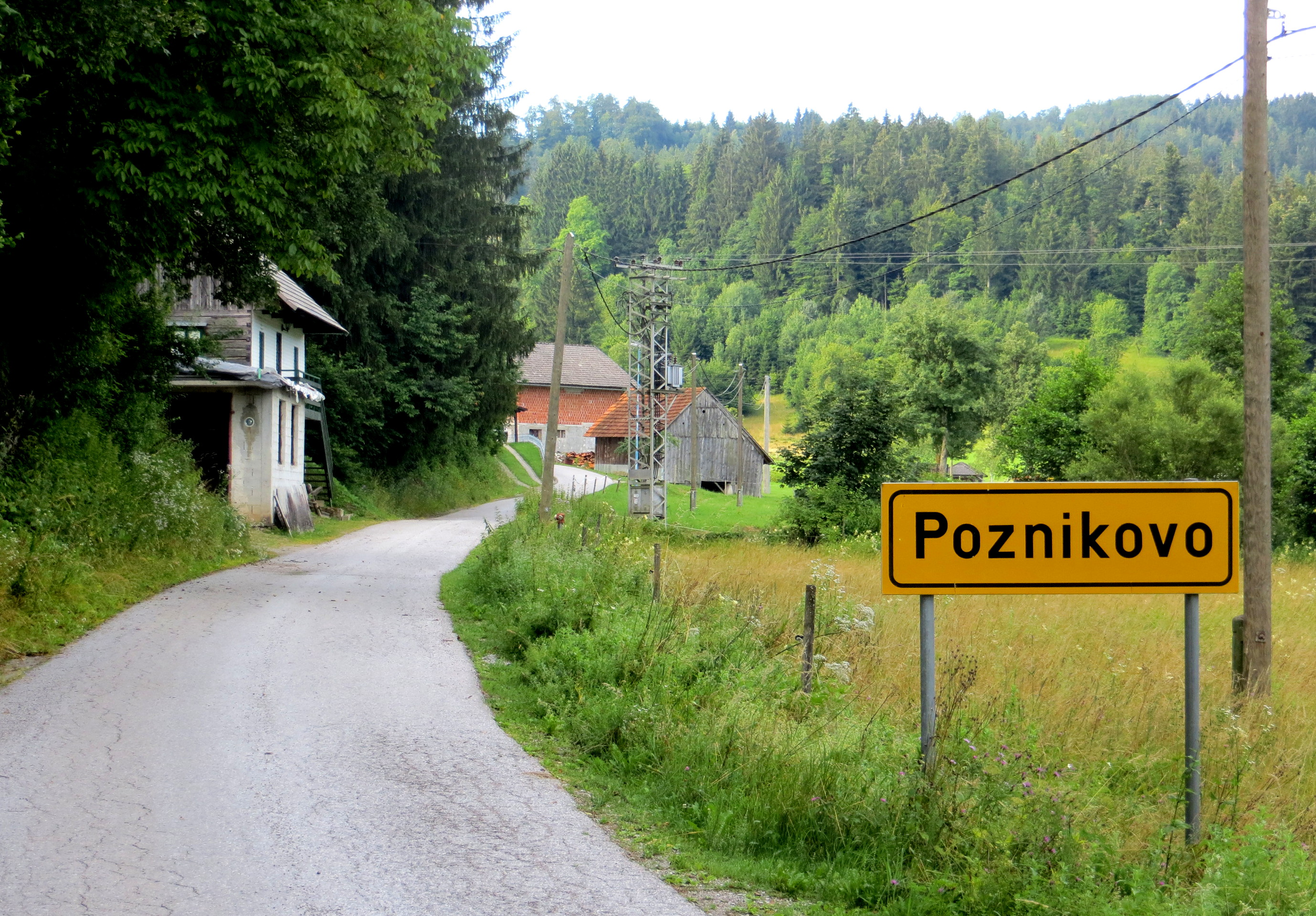

- Location in Slovenia
- Coordinates: 45°48′16.65″N 14°36′37.97″E
- Country: Slovenia
- Traditional region: Lower Carniola
- Statistical region: Central Slovenia
- Municipality: Velike Lašče

Area
  - Total: 0.3 km^{2} (0.12 sq mi)
- Elevation: 582.2 m (1,910 ft)

Population (2002)
  - Total: 17
- Postal code: 1315

Poznikovo (pronounced [ˈpoːznikɔʋɔ]; German: Posnikou) is a settlement on a small hill at the southern end of the Mišja Valley (Slovene: Mišja dolina) southwest of Velike Lašče in central Slovenia. The entire area around Velike Lašče is part of the traditional region of Lower Carniola and is now included in the Central Slovenia Statistical Region.
