= Ščurki =

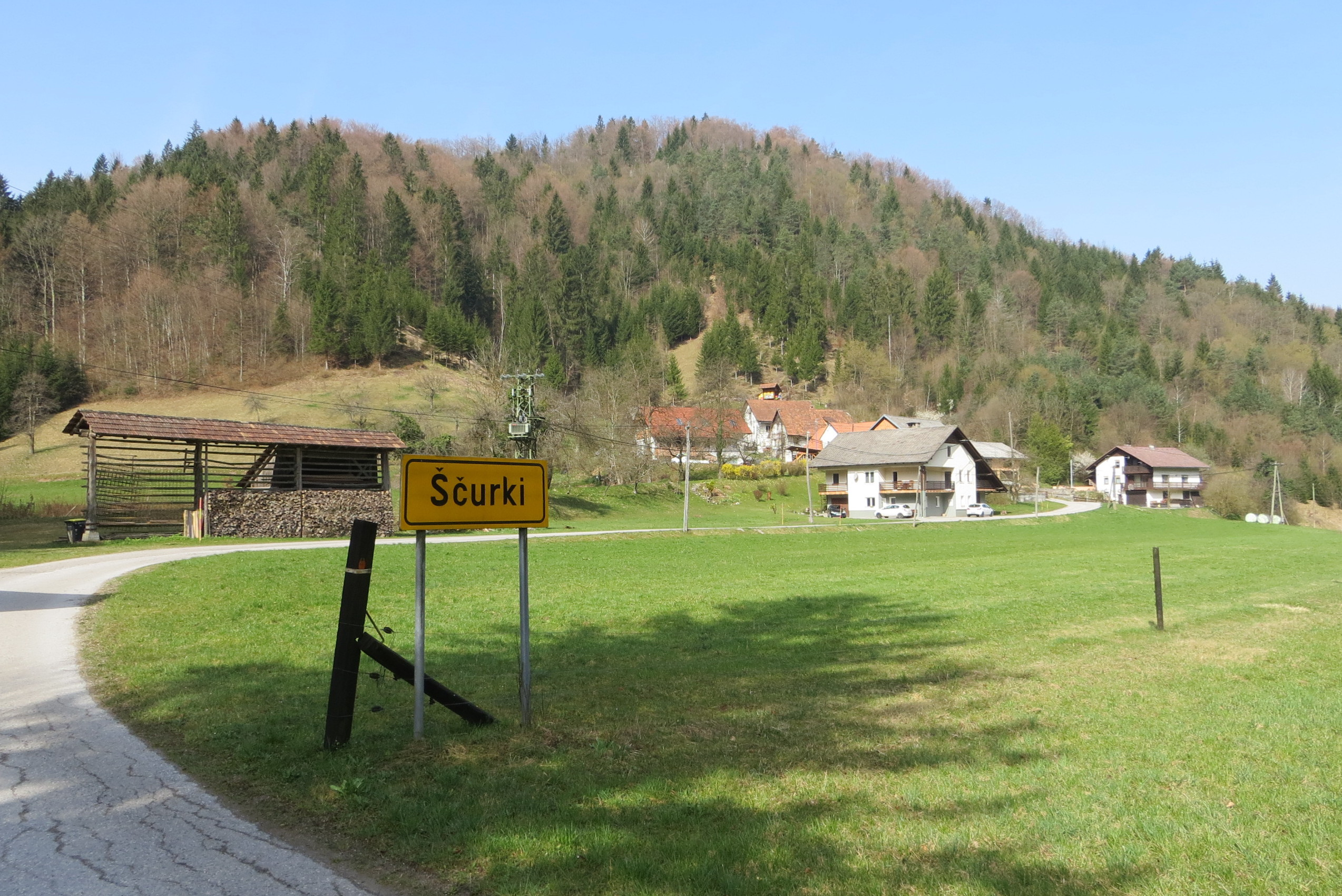

- Location in Slovenia
- Coordinates: 45°52′44.71″N 14°35′55.3″E
- Country: Slovenia
- Traditional region: Lower Carniola
- Statistical region: Central Slovenia
- Municipality: Velike Lašče

Area
  - Total: 0.88 km^{2} (0.34 sq mi)
- Elevation: 360.1 m (1,181 ft)

Population (2002)
  - Total: 15
- Postal code: 1311

Ščurki (pronounced [ˈʃtʃuːɾki]; in older sources also Ščurke, German: Schurke) is a small settlement west of Turjak in the Municipality of Velike Lašče in central Slovenia. The entire Municipality of Velike Lašče is part of the traditional region of Lower Carniola and is now included in the Central Slovenia Statistical Region.
