= Hlebče =

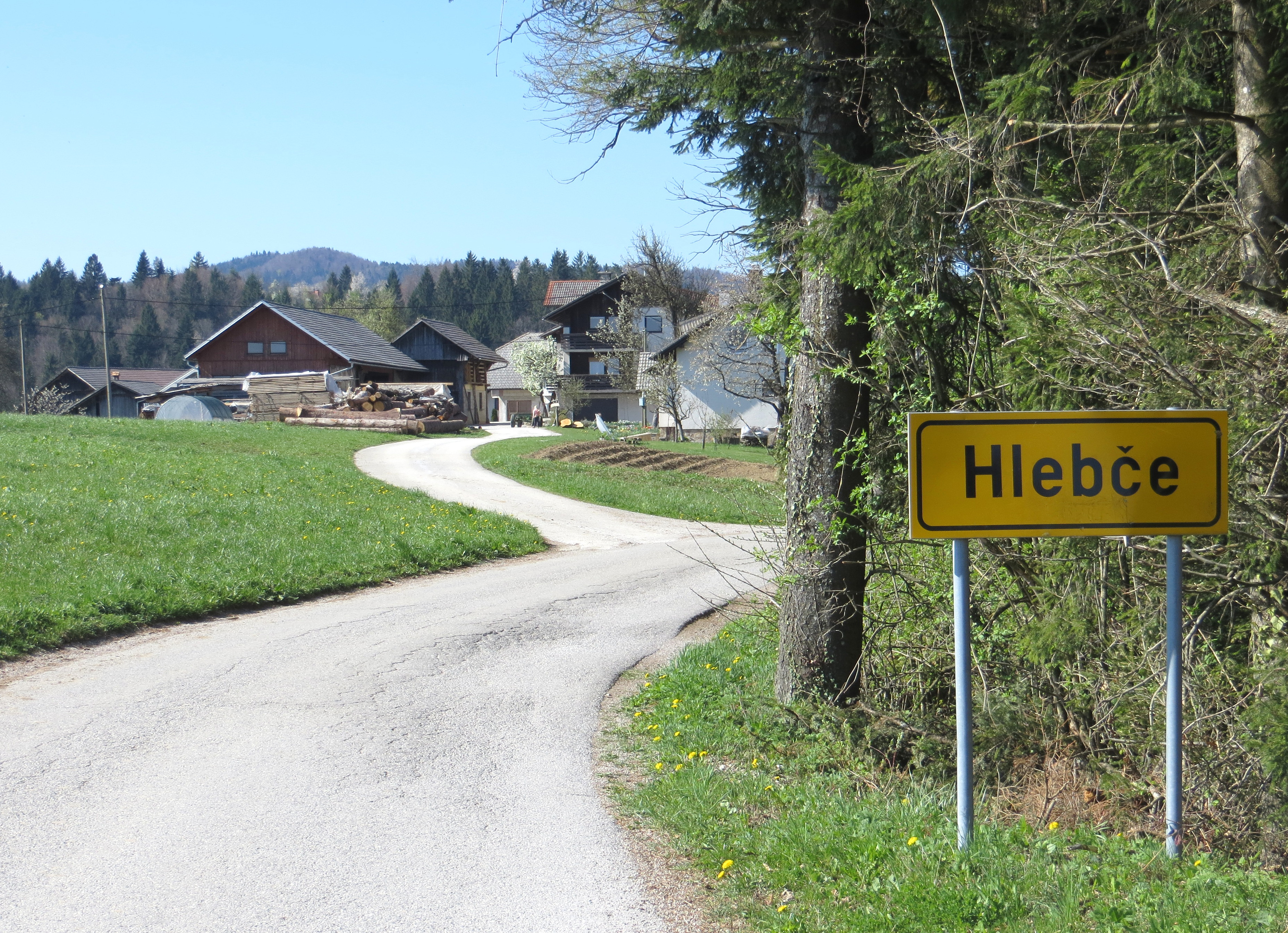

- Location in Slovenia
- Coordinates: 45°50′34.97″N 14°36′37.94″E
- Country: Slovenia
- Traditional region: Lower Carniola
- Statistical region: Central Slovenia
- Municipality: Velike Lašče

Area
  - Total: 0.35 km^{2} (0.14 sq mi)
- Elevation: 537.9 m (1,765 ft)

Population (2002)
  - Total: 38
- Postal code: 1315

Hlebče (pronounced [ˈxleːptʃɛ], German: Hlebtsche) is a small settlement in the Municipality of Velike Lašče in central Slovenia. The area is part of the traditional region of Lower Carniola and is now included in the Central Slovenia Statistical Region.
