= Centa, Velike Lašče =

Centa
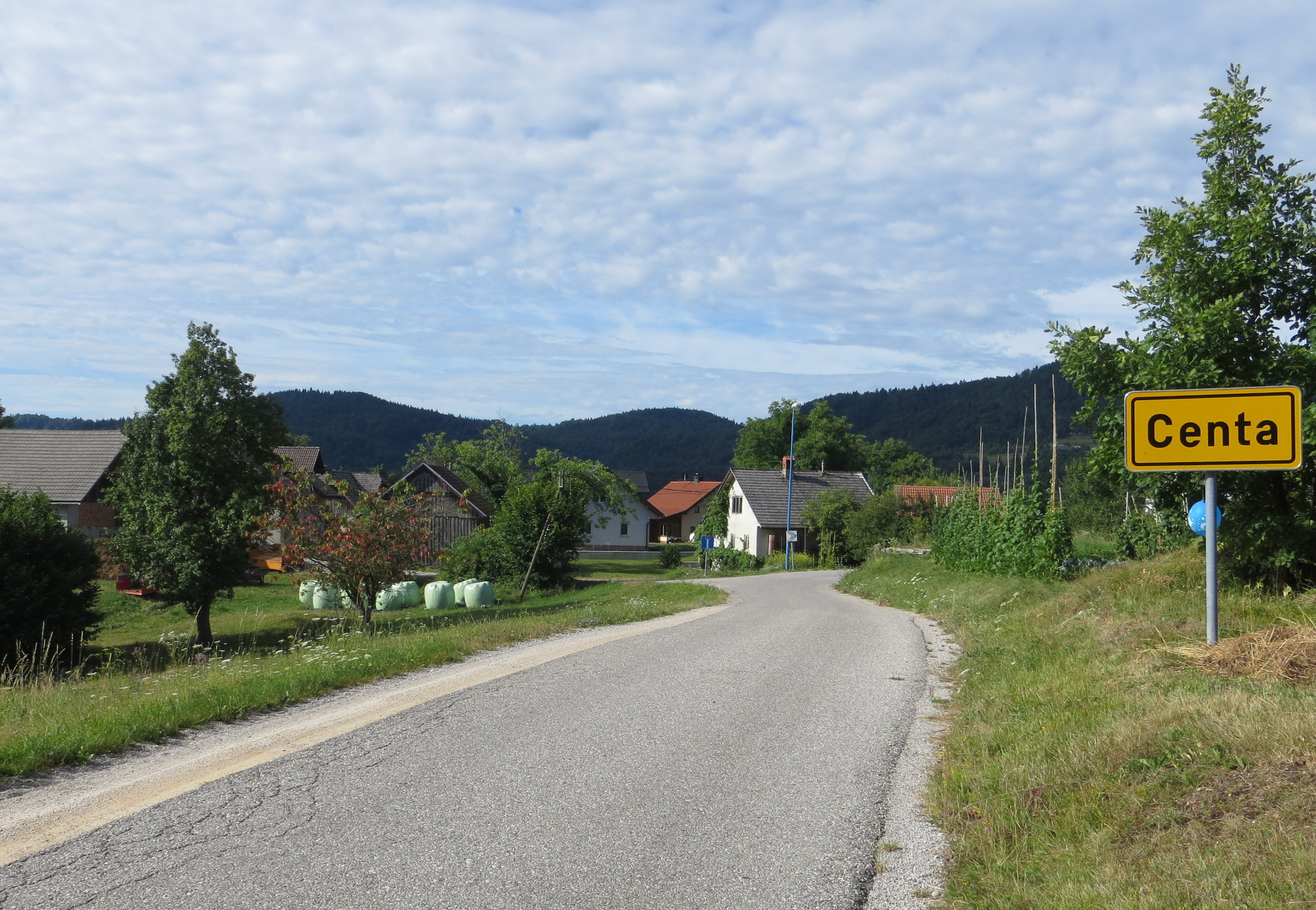

- Location in Slovenia
- Coordinates: 45°51′34.19″N 14°33′24.66″E
- Country: Slovenia
- Traditional region: Lower Carniola
- Statistical region: Central Slovenia
- Municipality: Velike Lašče

Area
  - Total: 0.72 km^{2} (0.28 sq mi)
- Elevation: 639.6 m (2,098 ft)

Population (2002)
  - Total: 10
- Postal code: 13154

Centa (pronounced [ˈtseːnta]) is a small settlement in the Municipality of Velike Lašče in Slovenia. The area is part of the traditional region of Lower Carniola and is now included in the Central Slovenia Statistical Region.

A small roadside chapel-shrine north of the village core is dedicated to Saint Anthony of Padua. It was built in the early 20th century.
