= Prhajevo =

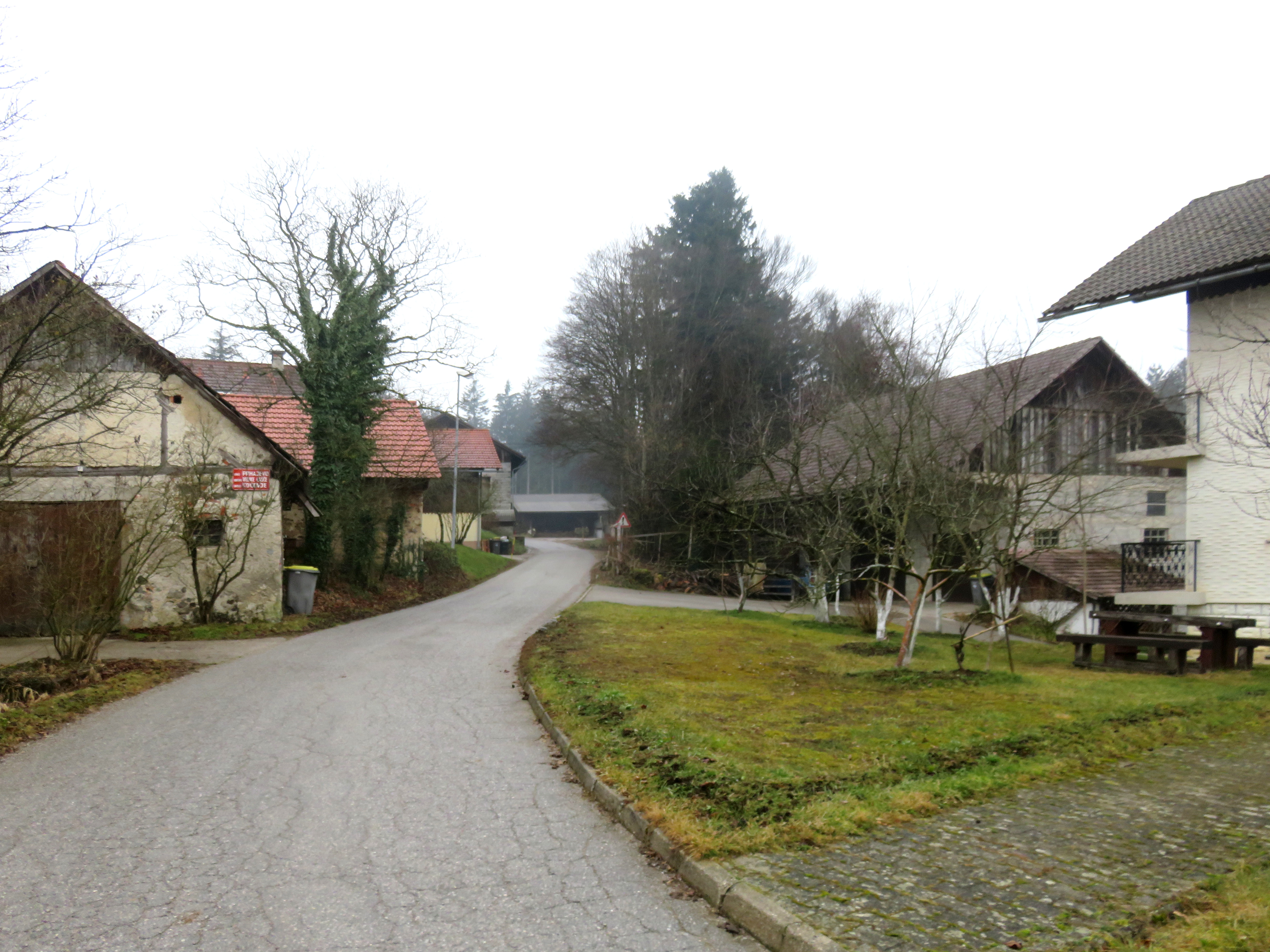

- Location in Slovenia
- Coordinates: 45°50′18.56″N 14°37′10.96″E
- Country: Slovenia
- Traditional region: Lower Carniola
- Statistical region: Central Slovenia
- Municipality: Velike Lašče

Area
  - Total: 0.28 km^{2} (0.11 sq mi)
- Elevation: 539.6 m (1,770 ft)

Population (2002)
  - Total: 13
- Postal code: 1315

Prhajevo (pronounced [pəɾˈxaːjɛʋɔ]) is a small settlement northwest of Velike Lašče in central Slovenia. The entire Municipality of Velike Lašče lies in the traditional region of Lower Carniola. It is included in the Central Slovenia Statistical Region.
