= Škamevec =

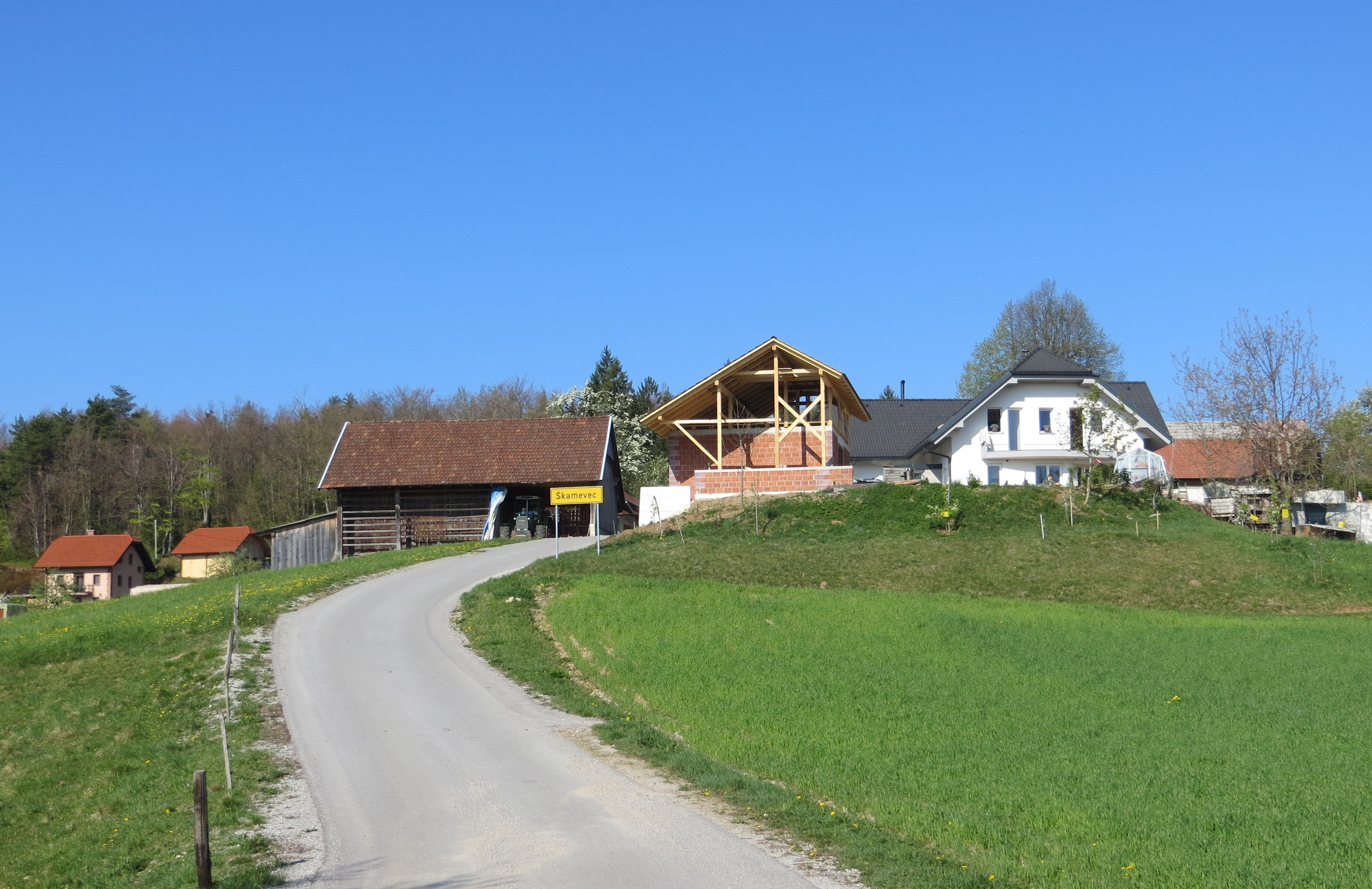

- Location in Slovenia
- Coordinates: 45°51′36.86″N 14°35′13.13″E
- Country: Slovenia
- Traditional region: Lower Carniola
- Statistical region: Central Slovenia
- Municipality: Velike Lašče

Area
  - Total: 0.63 km^{2} (0.24 sq mi)
- Elevation: 589.1 m (1,933 ft)

Population (2002)
  - Total: 14
- Postal code: 1314

Škamevec (pronounced [ʃkaˈmɛːʋəts]) is a settlement in the hills northwest of Rašica in the Municipality of Velike Lašče in central Slovenia. The entire municipality is part of the traditional region of Lower Carniola and is now included in the Central Slovenia Statistical Region.
