= Podkraj, Velike Lašče =

Podkraj
- Location in Slovenia
- Coordinates: 45°48′58.52″N 14°38′43.69″E
- Country: Slovenia
- Traditional region: Lower Carniola
- Statistical region: Central Slovenia
- Municipality: Velike Lašče

Area
  - Total: 0.61 km^{2} (0.24 sq mi)
- Elevation: 627.2 m (2,058 ft)

Population (2002)
  - Total: 21
- Postal code: 1315

Podkraj (pronounced [pɔtˈkɾai̯]) is a settlement in the hills south of Velike Lašče in central Slovenia. The entire Municipality of Velike Lašče is part of the traditional region of Lower Carniola and is now included in the Central Slovenia Statistical Region.
