= Marinčki =

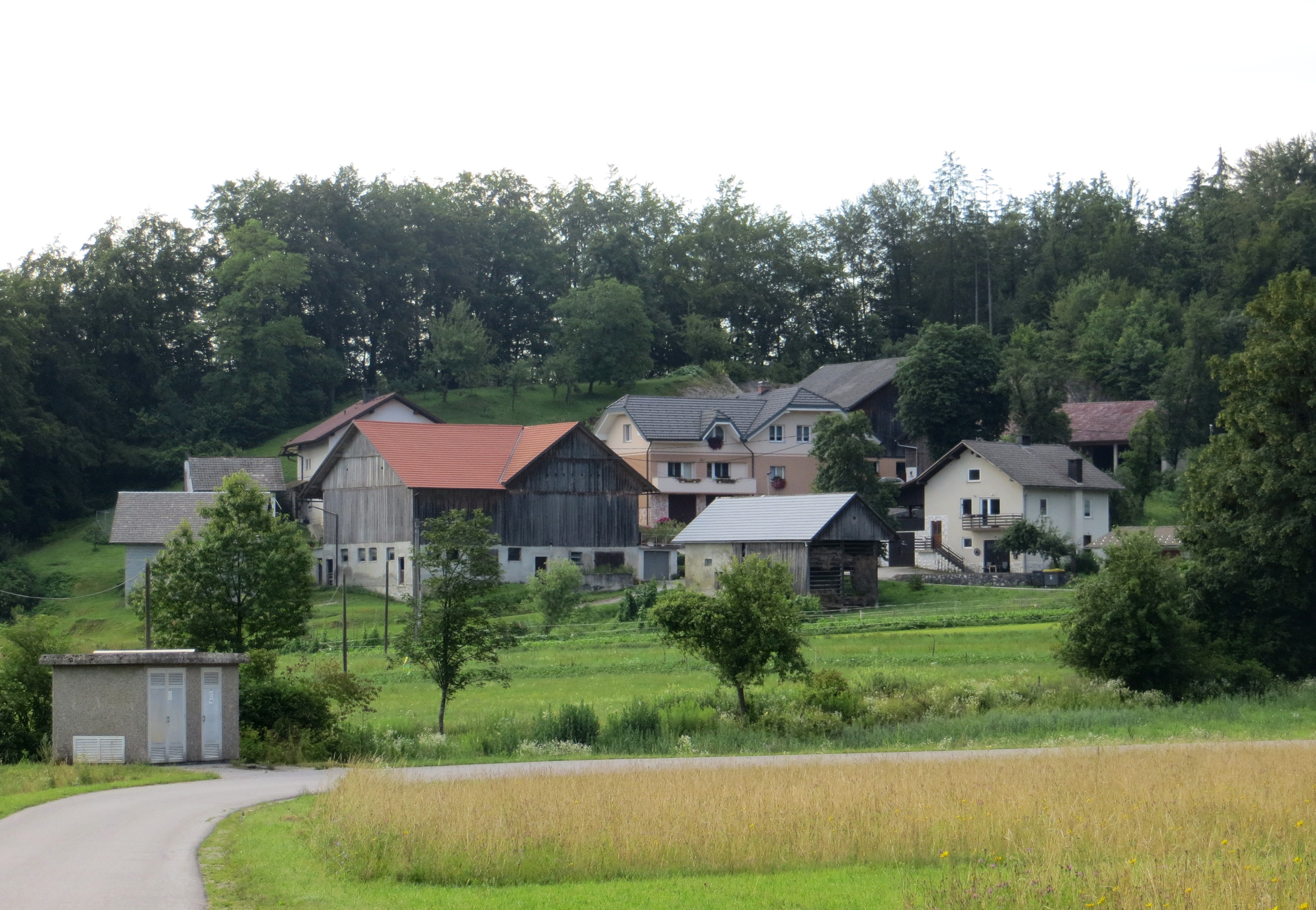

- Location in Slovenia
- Coordinates: 45°50′0.37″N 14°35′22.64″E
- Country: Slovenia
- Traditional region: Lower Carniola
- Statistical region: Central Slovenia
- Municipality: Velike Lašče

Area
  - Total: 0.76 km^{2} (0.29 sq mi)
- Elevation: 500.3 m (1,641 ft)

Population (2002)
  - Total: 17
- Postal code: 1314

Marinčki (pronounced [maˈɾiːntʃki]; in older sources also Marinček) is a settlement west of Velike Lašče in central Slovenia. The entire Municipality of Velike Lašče is part of the traditional region of Lower Carniola. It is now included in the Central Slovenia Statistical Region.
