= Prazniki =

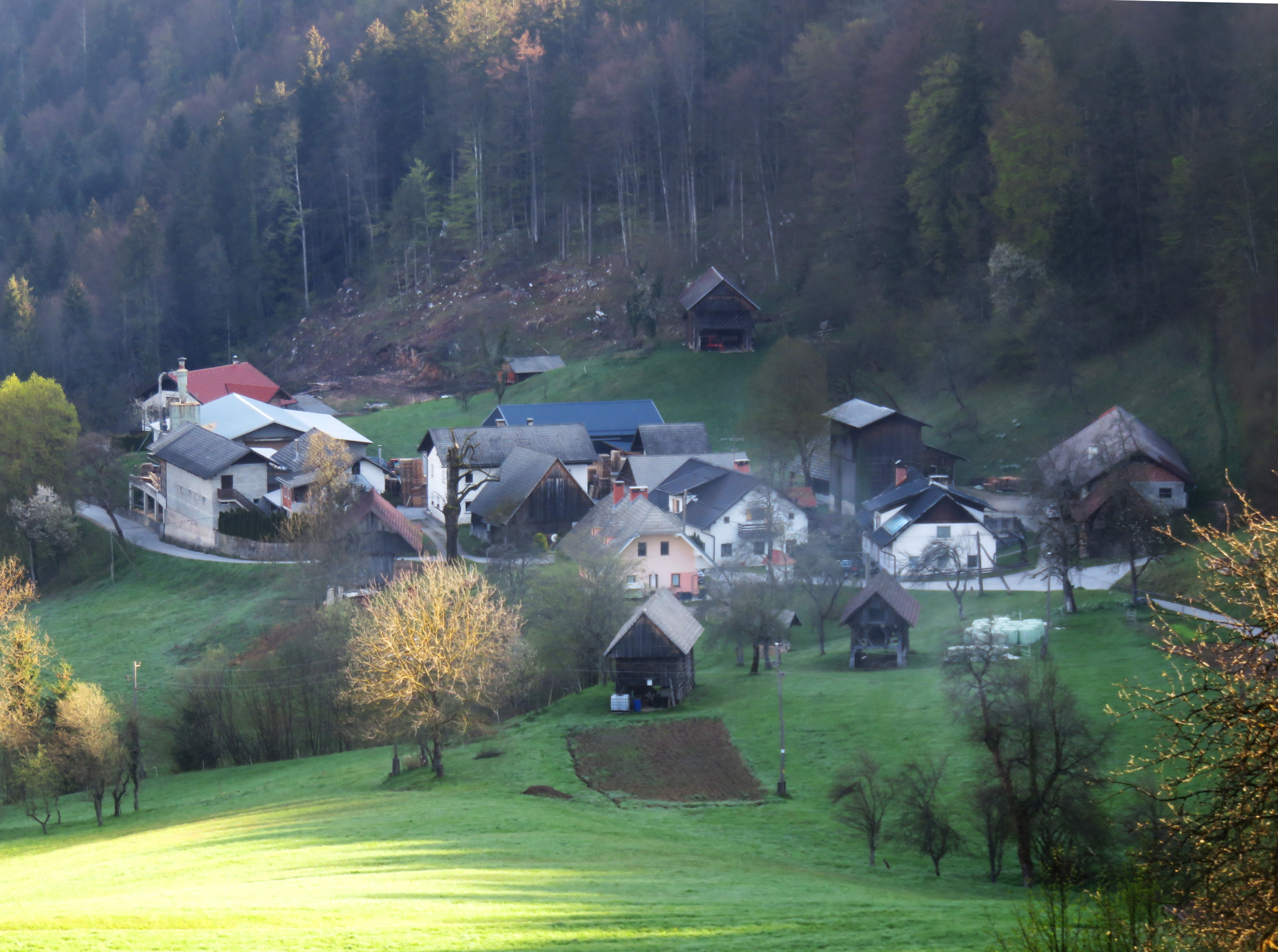

- Location in Slovenia
- Coordinates: 45°51′53.63″N 14°36′22.09″E
- Country: Slovenia
- Traditional region: Lower Carniola
- Statistical region: Central Slovenia
- Municipality: Velike Lašče

Area
  - Total: 0.9 km^{2} (0.35 sq mi)
- Elevation: 451 m (1,480 ft)

Population (2002)
  - Total: 20
- Postal code: 1311

Prazniki (pronounced [ˈpɾaːzniki]) is a small settlement south of Turjak in the Municipality of Velike Lašče in central Slovenia. The entire area is part of the traditional region of Lower Carniola and is now included in the Central Slovenia Statistical Region.

There is a small Baroque chapel-shrine in the settlement. It was built in the 18th century.
