= Škrlovica =

- Location in Slovenia
- Coordinates: 45°48′26.81″N 14°38′55.47″E
- Country: Slovenia
- Traditional region: Lower Carniola
- Statistical region: Central Slovenia
- Municipality: Velike Lašče

Area
  - Total: 1.29 km^{2} (0.50 sq mi)
- Elevation: 668.2 m (2,192 ft)

Population (2002)
  - Total: 38
- Postal code: 1315

Škrlovica (pronounced [ʃkəɾlɔˈʋiːtsa]) is a small village east of Dvorska Vas in the Municipality of Velike Lašče in central Slovenia. The municipality is part of the traditional region of Lower Carniola and is now included in the Central Slovenia Statistical Region.
