= Dolenje Kališče =

- Location in Slovenia
- Coordinates: 45°48′44.87″N 14°35′15.78″E
- Country: Slovenia
- Traditional region: Lower Carniola
- Statistical region: Central Slovenia
- Municipality: Velike Lašče

Area
  - Total: 0.47 km^{2} (0.18 sq mi)
- Elevation: 753.2 m (2,471 ft)

Population (2002)
  - Total: 0
- Postal code: 1314

Dolenje Kališče (pronounced [dɔˈleːnjɛ kaˈliːʃtʃɛ]; in older sources also Dolenje Kališe, German: Unterkalische) is a small abandoned settlement in the Municipality of Velike Lašče in Slovenia. It no longer has any permanent residents or a proper access road. The area is part of the traditional region of Lower Carniola and is now included in the Central Slovenia Statistical Region.

== Gallery ==
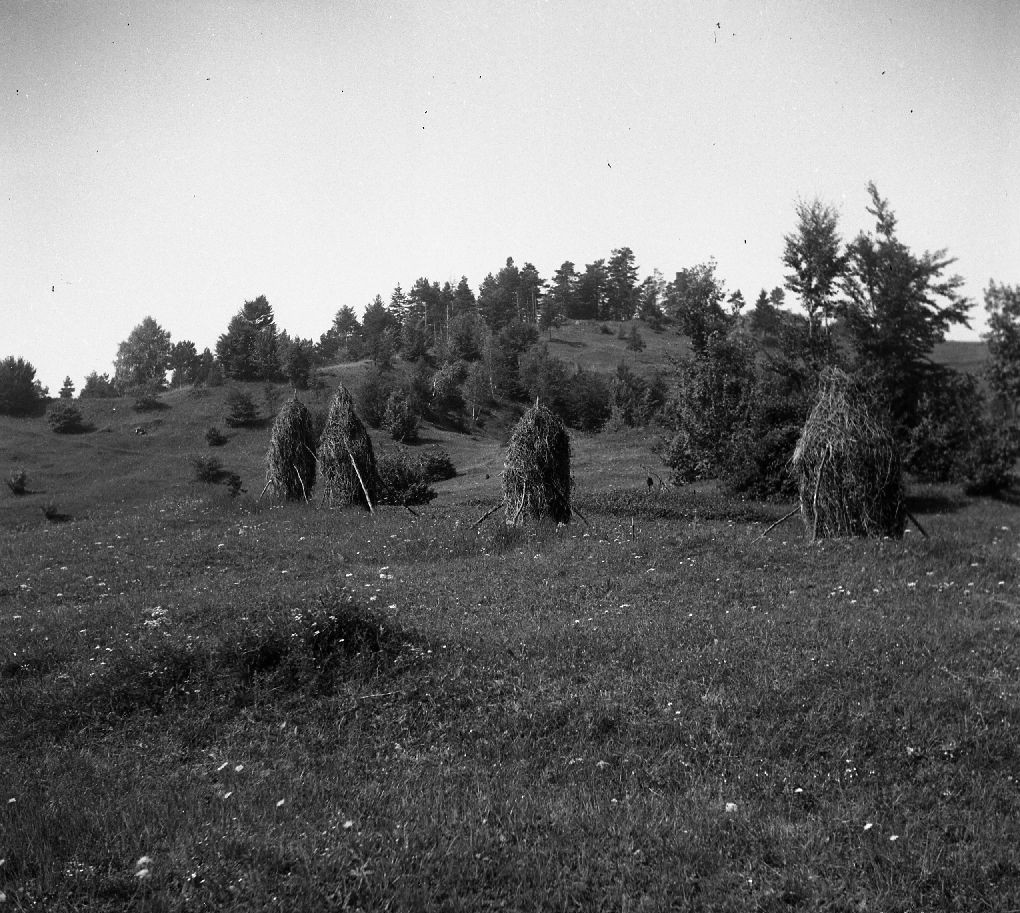
A clover field in Dolenje Kališče, 1960
