= Četež pri Turjaku =

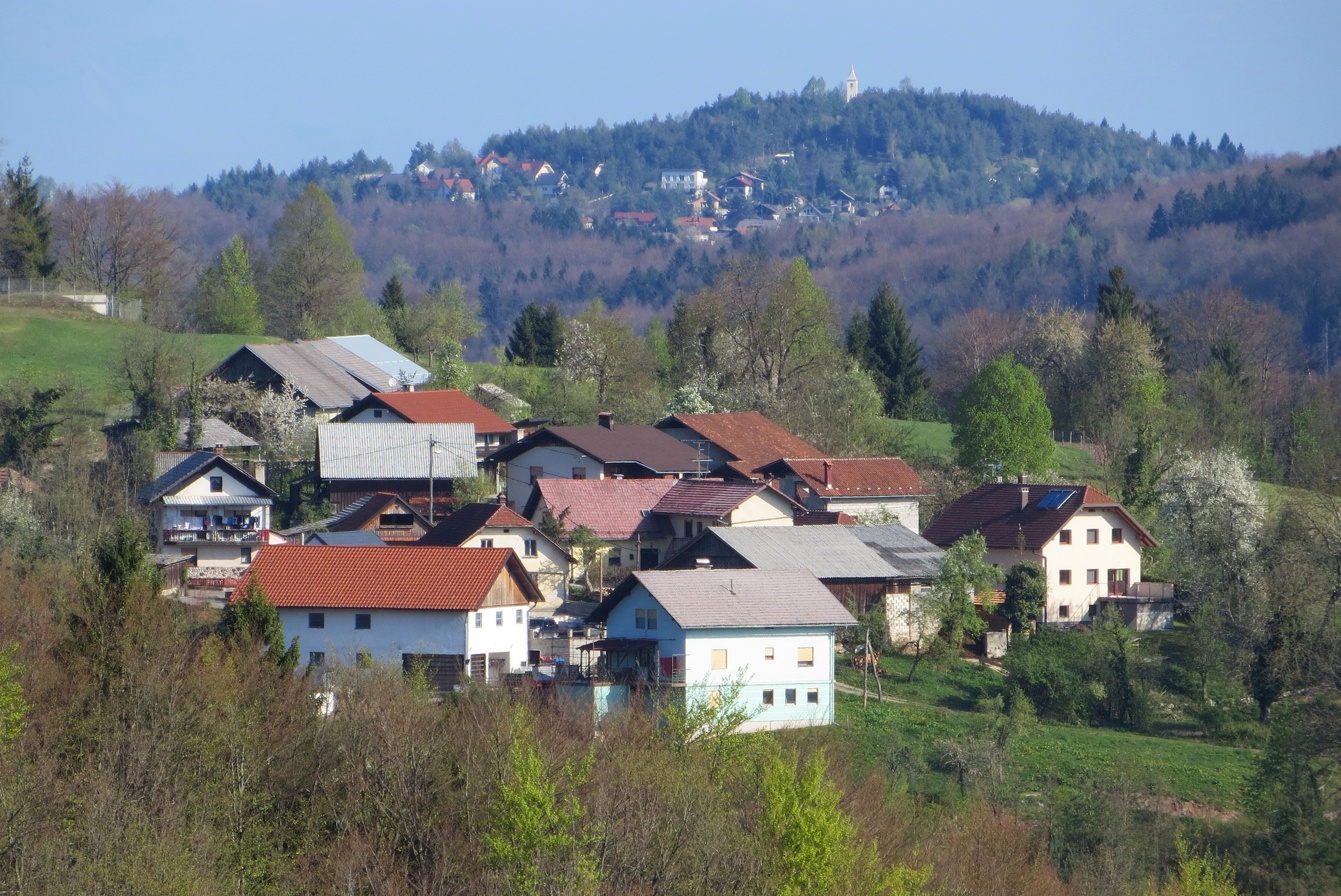

- Location in Slovenia
- Coordinates: 45°52′19.42″N 14°35′46.2″E
- Country: Slovenia
- Traditional region: Lower Carniola
- Statistical region: Central Slovenia
- Municipality: Velike Lašče

Area
  - Total: 1.33 km^{2} (0.51 sq mi)
- Elevation: 514.5 m (1,688 ft)

Population (2002)
  - Total: 28
- Postal code: 1311

Četež pri Turjaku (pronounced [ˈtʃeːtɛʃ pɾi tuˈrjaːku]) is a settlement in the hills west of Turjak in the Municipality of Velike Lašče in Slovenia. The area is part of the traditional region of Lower Carniola and is now included in the Central Slovenia Statistical Region.

== Name ==
The name of the settlement was changed from Četež to Četež pri Turjaku in 1953.
