= Strletje =

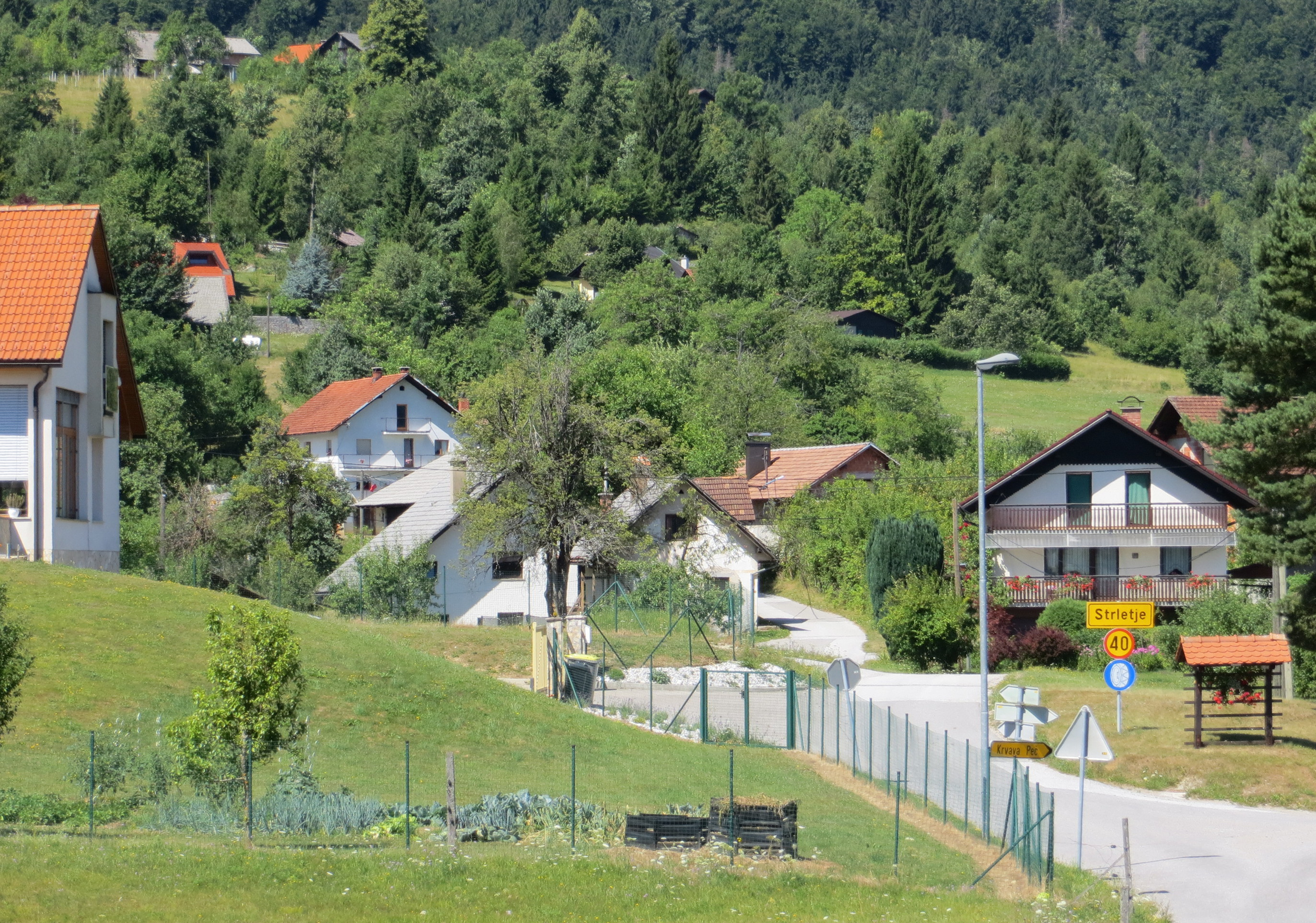

- Location in Slovenia
- Coordinates: 45°50′58.15″N 14°33′3.16″E
- Country: Slovenia
- Traditional region: Lower Carniola
- Statistical region: Central Slovenia
- Municipality: Velike Lašče

Area
  - Total: 0.52 km^{2} (0.20 sq mi)
- Elevation: 626.5 m (2,055 ft)

Population (2002)
  - Total: 29
- Postal code: 1314

Strletje (pronounced [stəɾˈleːtjɛ]) is a settlement west of Rob in the Municipality of Velike Lašče in central Slovenia. The municipality is part of the traditional region of Lower Carniola and is now included in the Central Slovenia Statistical Region.

A small roadside chapel-shrine east of settlement, containing a statue of the Virgin Mary, dates to the early 20th century.
