= Municipality of Velike Lašče =

Municipality of Slovenia

Municipality of Velike Lašče Občina Velike Lašče
- Municipality
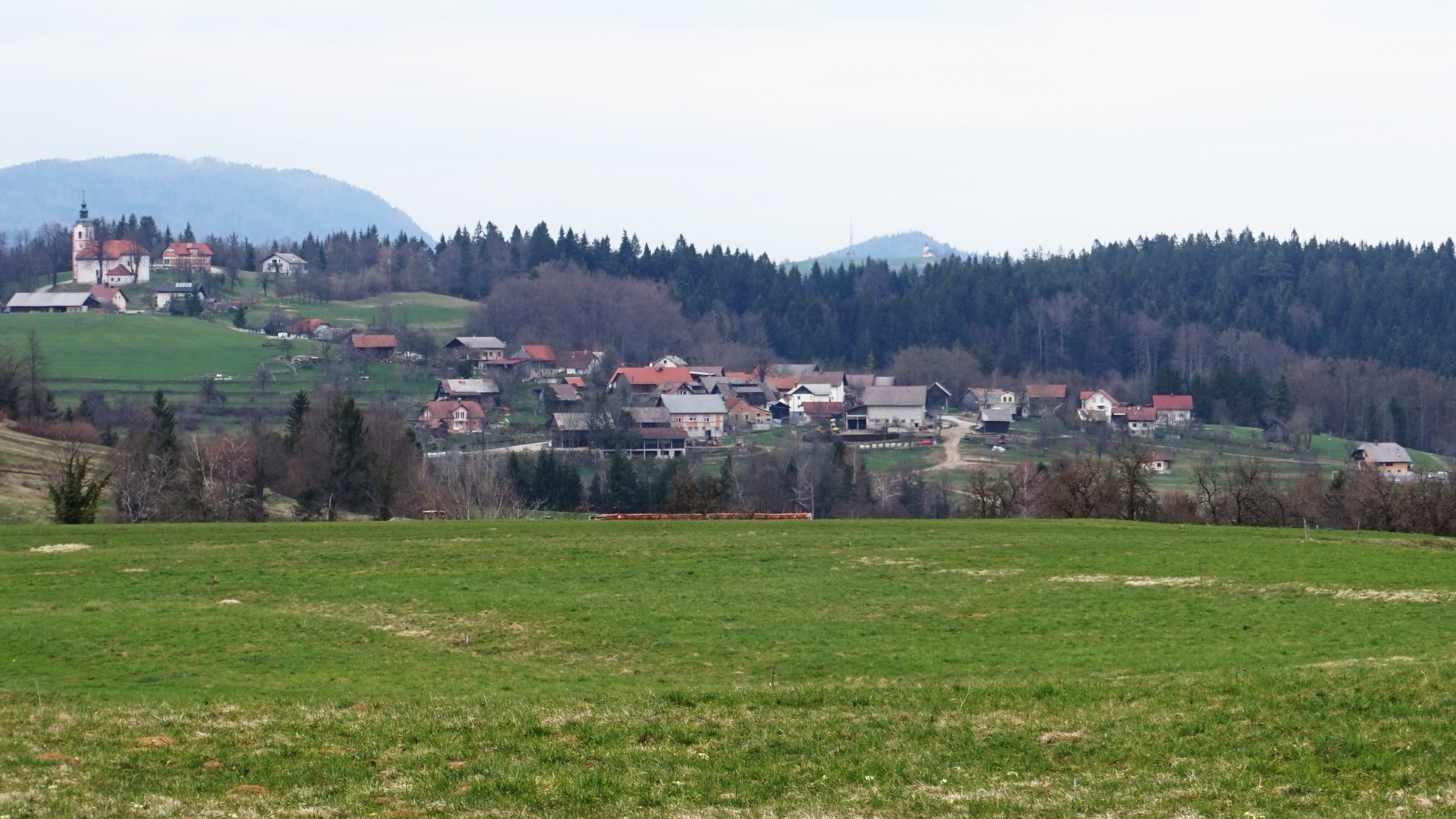

- Location of the Municipality of Velike Lašče in Slovenia
- Coordinates: 45°50′N 14°38′E
- Country: Slovenia
- Traditional region: Lower Carniola
- Statistical region: Central Slovenia

Government
  - Mayor: Tadej Malovrh

Area
  - Total: 103.2 km^{2} (39.8 sq mi)

Population (2011)
  - Total: 4,190
  - Density: 40.6/km^{2} (105/sq mi)
- Time zone: UTC+01 (CET)
  - Summer (DST): UTC+02 (CEST)
- Website: www.velike-lasce.si

The Municipality of Velike Lašče (pronounced [ˈʋeːlikɛ ˈlaːʃtʃɛ]; Slovene: Občina Velike Lašče) is a municipality in Slovenia. The seat of the municipality is the town of Velike Lašče. It is part of the traditional region of Lower Carniola and is now included in the Central Slovenia Statistical Region.

The area is the birthplace of a number of notable Slovene writers: Primož Trubar, Josip Stritar, Fran Levstik, and Jože Javoršek.

== Settlements ==
In addition to the municipal seat of Velike Lašče, the municipality also includes the following settlements:

- Adamovo
- Bane
- Bavdek
- Borovec pri Karlovici
- Boštetje
- Brankovo
- Brlog
- Bukovec
- Centa
- Četež pri Turjaku
- Dednik
- Dolenje Kališče
- Dolnje Retje
- Dolščaki
- Dvorska Vas
- Gorenje Kališče
- Gornje Retje
- Gradež
- Gradišče
- Grm
- Hlebče
- Hrustovo
- Jakičevo
- Javorje
- Kaplanovo
- Karlovica
- Knej
- Kot pri Veliki Slevici
- Krkovo pri Karlovici
- Krvava Peč
- Kukmaka
- Laporje
- Laze
- Logarji
- Lužarji
- Mački
- Mala Slevica
- Male Lašče
- Mali Ločnik
- Mali Osolnik
- Marinčki
- Medvedjek
- Mohorje
- Naredi
- Opalkovo
- Osredek
- Pečki
- Plosovo
- Podhojni Hrib
- Podkogelj
- Podkraj
- Podlog
- Podsmreka pri Velikih Laščah
- Podstrmec
- Podulaka
- Podžaga
- Polzelo
- Poznikovo
- Prazniki
- Prhajevo
- Prilesje
- Purkače
- Pušče
- Rašica
- Rob
- Rupe
- Ščurki
- Sekirišče
- Selo pri Robu
- Škamevec
- Škrlovica
- Sloka Gora
- Srnjak
- Srobotnik pri Velikih Laščah
- Stope
- Strletje
- Strmec
- Tomažini
- Turjak
- Ulaka
- Uzmani
- Velika Slevica
- Veliki Ločnik
- Veliki Osolnik
- Vrh
- Žaga
- Zgonče
