= Strmec, Velike Lašče =

Strmec
- Location in Slovenia
- Coordinates: 45°49′15.64″N 14°38′29.68″E
- Country: Slovenia
- Traditional region: Lower Carniola
- Statistical region: Central Slovenia
- Municipality: Velike Lašče

Area
  - Total: 0.71 km^{2} (0.27 sq mi)
- Elevation: 613.9 m (2,014 ft)

Population (2002)
  - Total: 8
- Postal code: 1315

Strmec (pronounced [ˈstəɾməts]) is a small village in the hills south of Velike Lašče in central Slovenia. With the rest of the Municipality of Velike Lašče it is part of the traditional region of Lower Carniola and is now included in the Central Slovenia Statistical Region.
