= Knej =

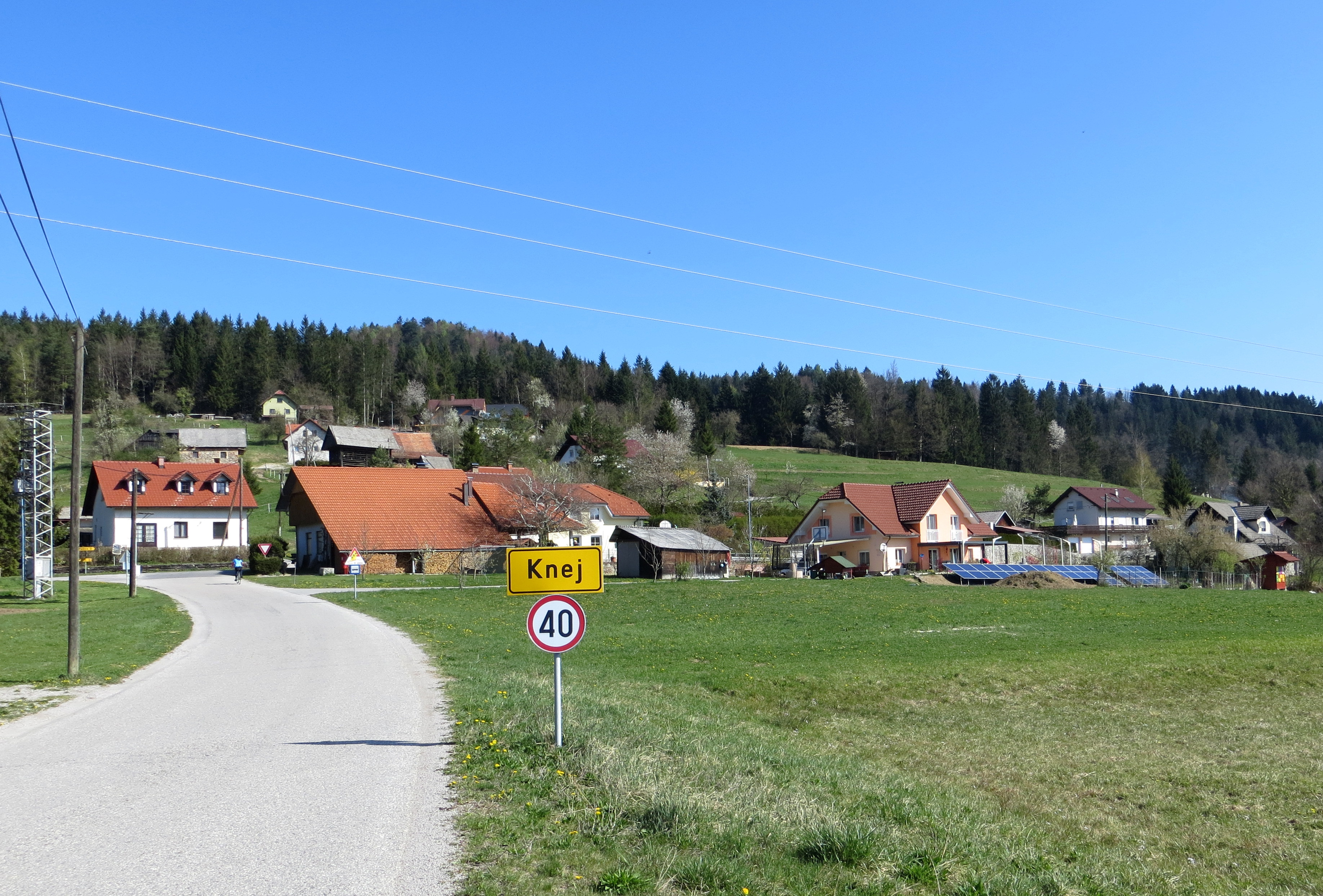

- Location in Slovenia
- Coordinates: 45°50′47.77″N 14°35′54.74″E
- Country: Slovenia
- Traditional region: Lower Carniola
- Statistical region: Central Slovenia
- Municipality: Velike Lašče

Area
  - Total: 0.74 km^{2} (0.29 sq mi)
- Elevation: 493.8 m (1,620 ft)

Population (2002)
  - Total: 22
- Postal code: 1314

Knej (pronounced [ˈkneːi̯] or [ˈknɛi̯]) is a small settlement west of Rašica in the Municipality of Velike Lašče in central Slovenia. The area is part of the traditional region of Lower Carniola and is now included in the Central Slovenia Statistical Region.

== Name ==
The settlement was first attested in 1389 as zu dem Kne (and as in der Kneya in 1463 and Kney in 1484). The name Knej is believed to be related to Russian kneja (кнея) 'woods in the middle of a field' and Polish knieja 'woods where it is forbidden to cut; hunting area', both derived from Slavic *kъnъ 'stump', thus referring to a local geographical feature.
