= Mali Ločnik =

- Location in Slovenia
- Coordinates: 45°53′27″N 14°36′46.48″E
- Country: Slovenia
- Traditional region: Lower Carniola
- Statistical region: Central Slovenia
- Municipality: Velike Lašče

Area
  - Total: 0.93 km^{2} (0.36 sq mi)
- Elevation: 589.1 m (1,933 ft)

Population (2002)
  - Total: 51
- Postal code: 1311

Mali Ločnik (pronounced [ˈmaːli lɔtʃˈniːk] or [ˈmaːli ˈloːtʃnik]; German: Kleinlotschnik) is a settlement north of Turjak in the Municipality of Velike Lašče in central Slovenia. The entire Municipality of Velike Lašče is part of the traditional region of Lower Carniola and is now included in the Central Slovenia Statistical Region.

The local church, built on a hill northwest of the village, is dedicated to Saint Agathius (Slovene: sveti Ahac) and belongs to the Parish of Turjak. It dates to the 15th century.
