= Krkovo pri Karlovici =

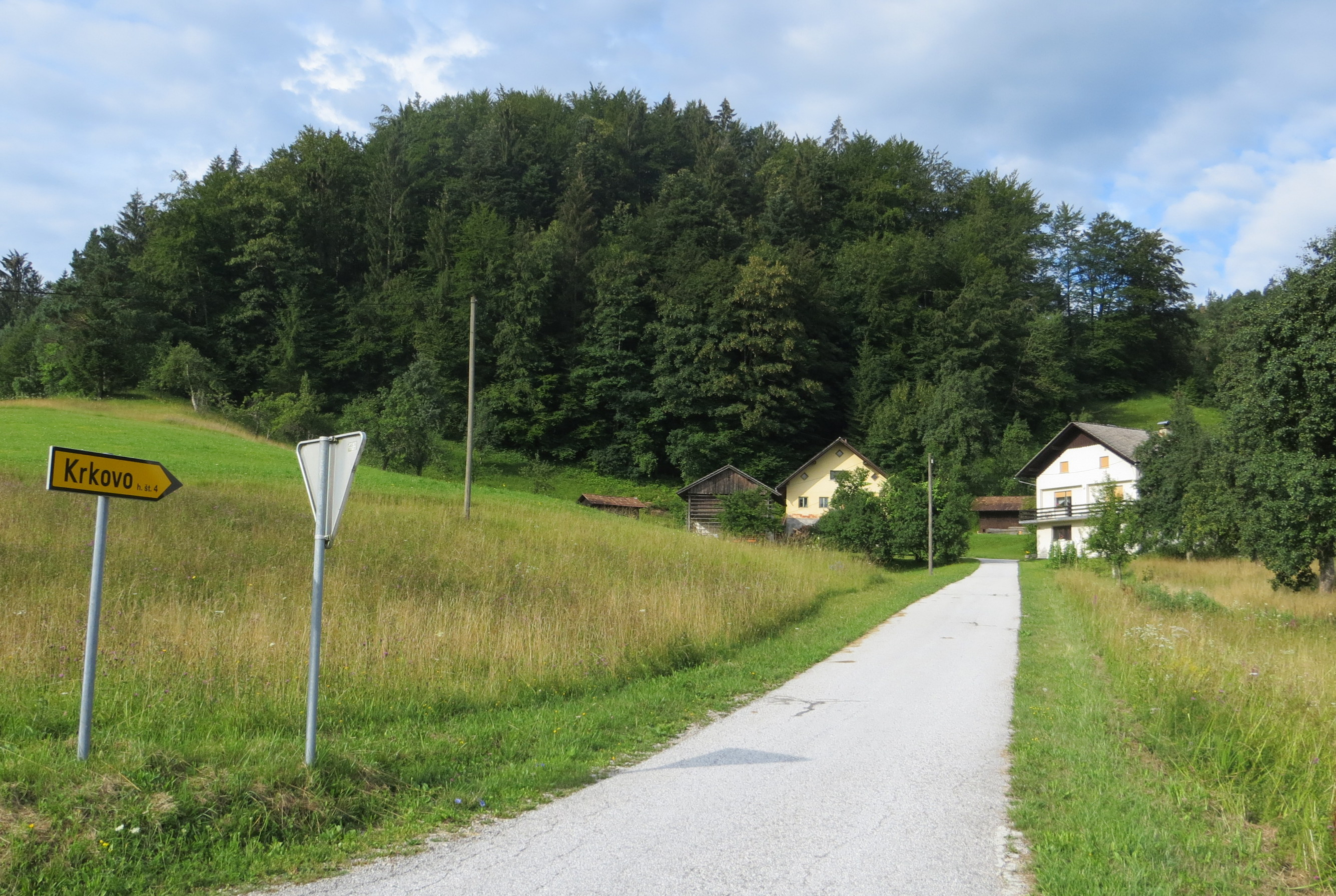

- Location in Slovenia
- Coordinates: 45°48′50.52″N 14°35′56.04″E
- Country: Slovenia
- Traditional region: Lower Carniola
- Statistical region: Central Slovenia
- Municipality: Velike Lašče

Area
  - Total: 0.49 km^{2} (0.19 sq mi)
- Elevation: 585.7 m (1,922 ft)

Population (2002)
  - Total: 12
- Postal code: 1315

Krkovo pri Karlovici (pronounced [kəɾˈkɔːʋɔ pɾi ˈkaːɾlɔʋitsi]) is a small settlement north of Karlovica in the Municipality of Velike Lašče in central Slovenia. The area is part of the traditional region of Lower Carniola and is now included in the Central Slovenia Statistical Region.

== Name ==
The name of the settlement was changed from Krkovo to Krkovo pri Karlovici in 1953.
