= Kot pri Veliki Slevici =

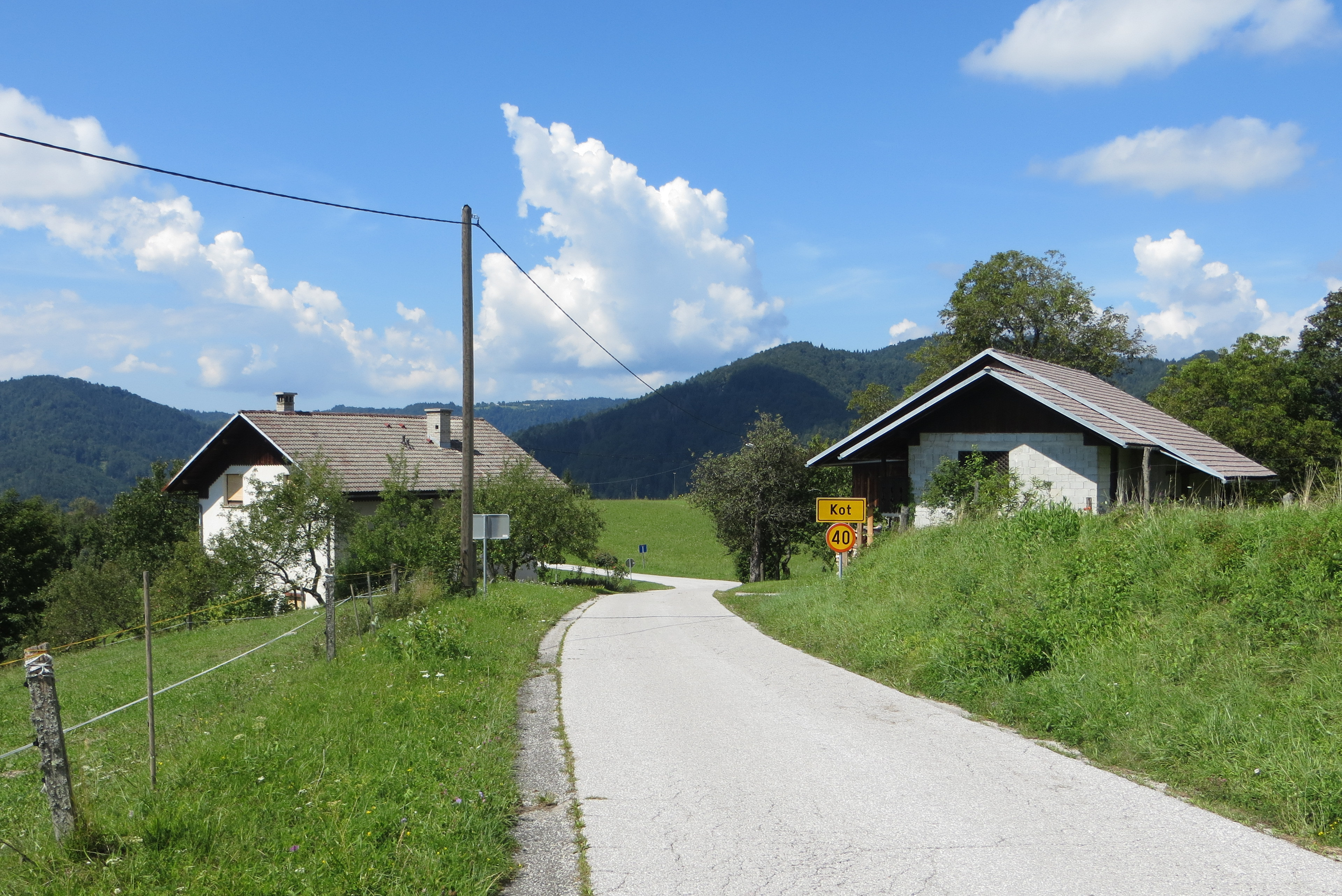

- Location in Slovenia
- Coordinates: 45°48′41.03″N 14°37′2.35″E
- Country: Slovenia
- Traditional region: Lower Carniola
- Statistical region: Central Slovenia
- Municipality: Velike Lašče

Area
  - Total: 0.7 km^{2} (0.27 sq mi)
- Elevation: 606.9 m (1,991 ft)

Population (2002)
  - Total: 7
- Postal code: 1315

Kot pri Veliki Slevici (pronounced [ˈkoːt pɾi ˈʋeːliki ˈsleːʋitsi]) is a small settlement south of Velika Slevica in the Municipality of Velike Lašče in central Slovenia. The area is part of the traditional region of Lower Carniola and is now included in the Central Slovenia Statistical Region.

== Name ==
Kot pri Veliki Slevici was attested in historical sources as Winkel in 1505. The name of the settlement was changed from Kot to Kot pri Veliki Slevici in 1953.
