= Podžaga =

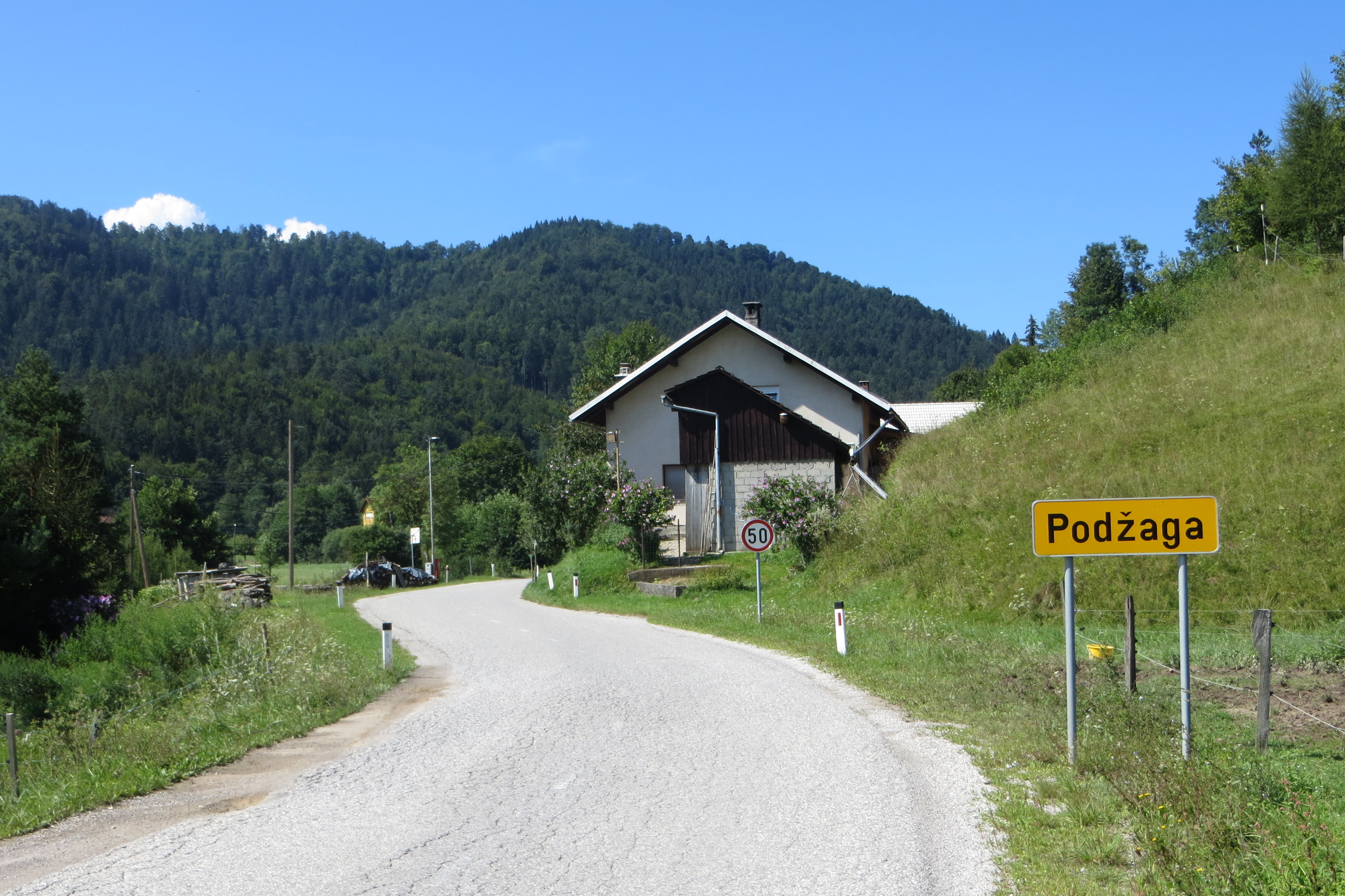

- Location in Slovenia
- Coordinates: 45°48′17.09″N 14°35′39.61″E
- Country: Slovenia
- Traditional region: Lower Carniola
- Statistical region: Central Slovenia
- Municipality: Velike Lašče

Area
  - Total: 0.6 km^{2} (0.23 sq mi)
- Elevation: 534.4 m (1,753 ft)

Population (2002)
  - Total: 22
- Postal code: 1315

Podžaga (pronounced [pɔˈdʒaːɡa]) is a small settlement at the southern end of the Mišja Valley (Slovene: Mišja dolina) southwest of Velike Lašče in central Slovenia. The entire Municipality of Velike Lašče is part of the traditional Lower Carniola region and is included in the Central Slovenia Statistical Region.
