= Plosovo =

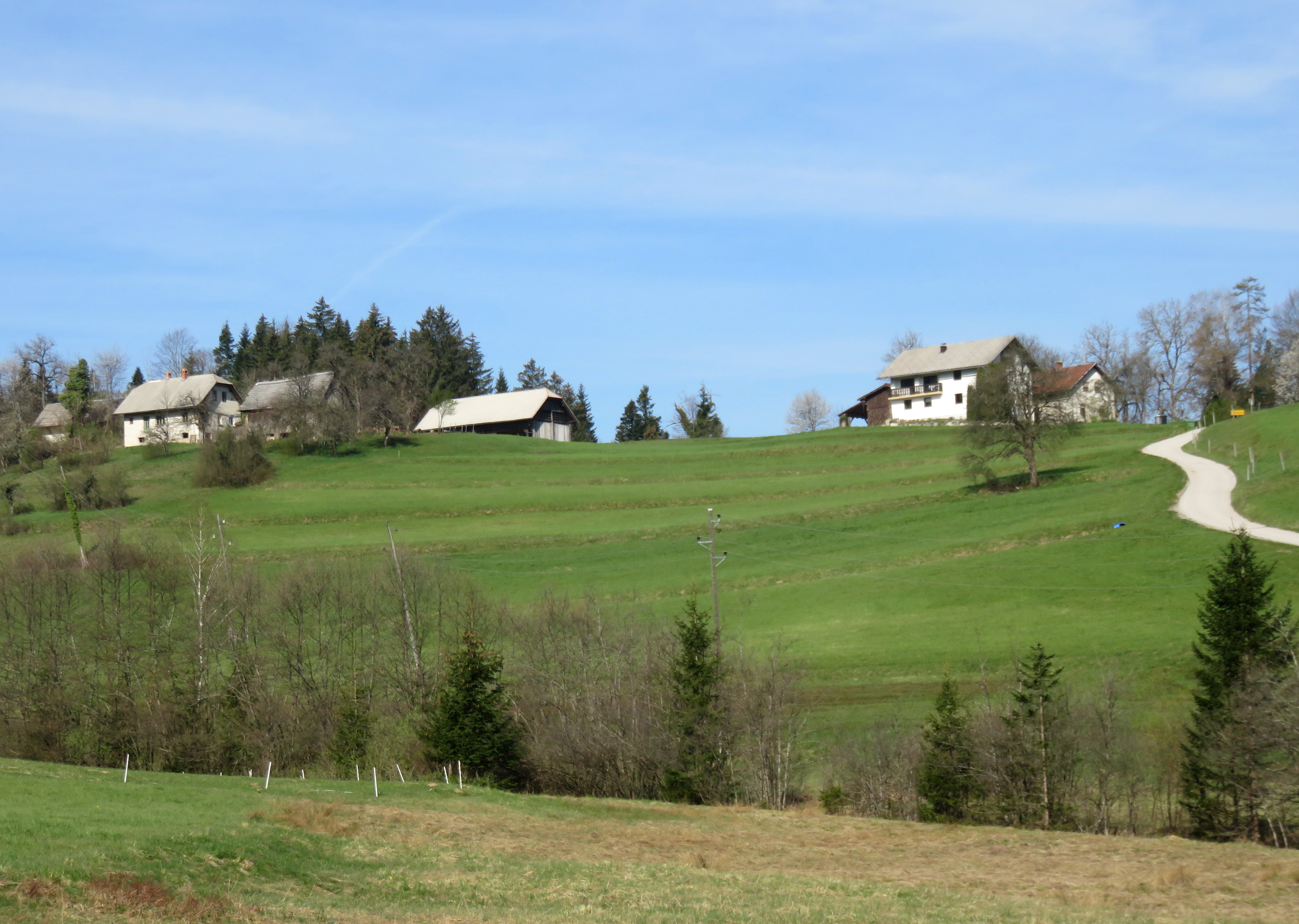

- Location in Slovenia
- Coordinates: 45°48′10.78″N 14°36′27.82″E
- Country: Slovenia
- Traditional region: Lower Carniola
- Statistical region: Central Slovenia
- Municipality: Velike Lašče

Area
  - Total: 0.25 km^{2} (0.097 sq mi)
- Elevation: 568.7 m (1,866 ft)

Population (2002)
  - Total: 8
- Postal code: 1315

Plosovo (pronounced [ˈploːsɔʋɔ]; German: Plasau) is a small settlement at the southern end of the Mišja Valley (Slovene: Mišja dolina) southwest of Velike Lašče in central Slovenia. The entire Municipality of Velike Lašče is part of the traditional region of Lower Carniola and is now included in the Central Slovenia Statistical Region.
