= Kukmaka =

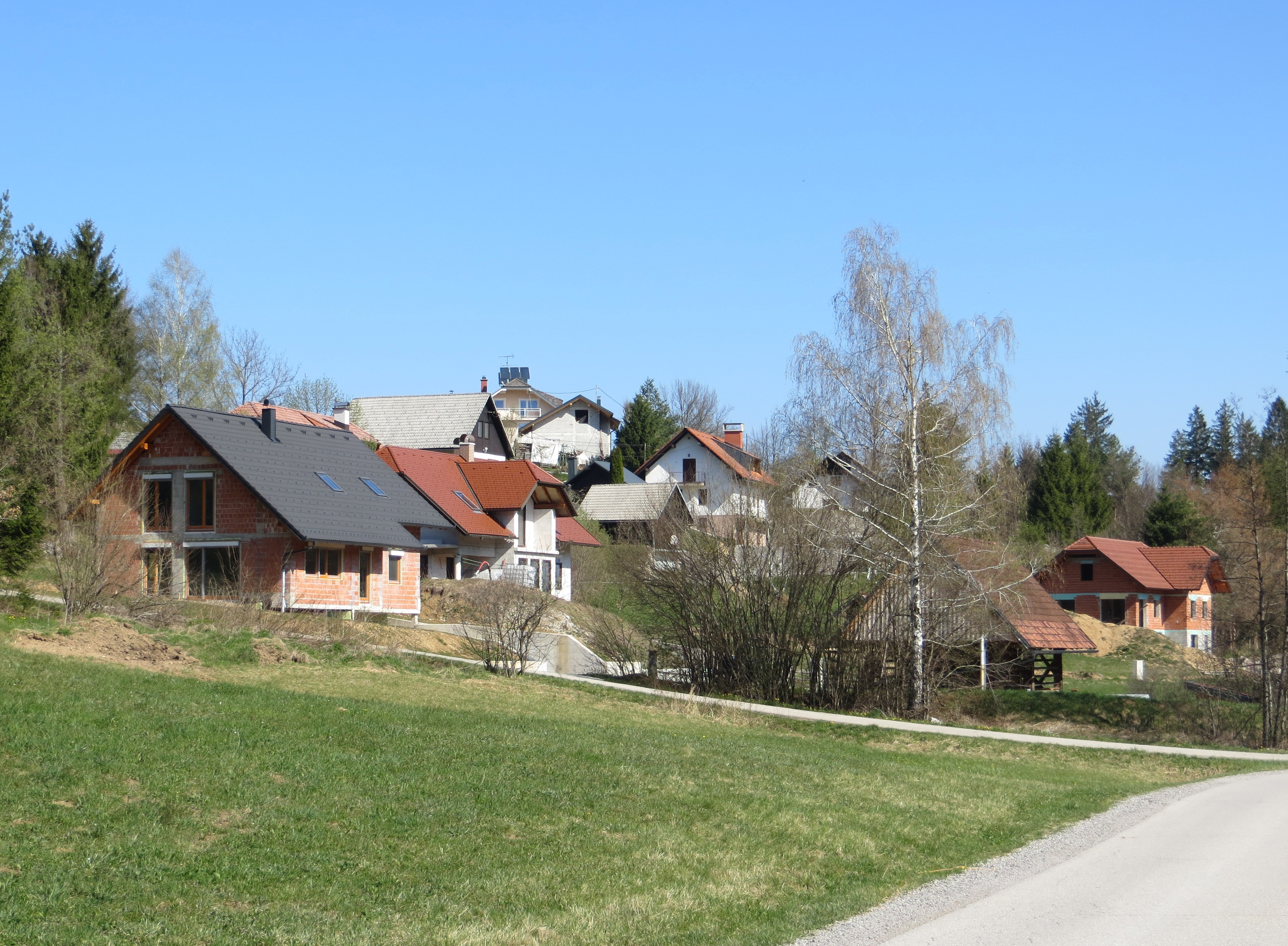

- Location in Slovenia
- Coordinates: 45°50′55.8″N 14°37′9.78″E
- Country: Slovenia
- Traditional region: Lower Carniola
- Statistical region: Central Slovenia
- Municipality: Velike Lašče

Area
  - Total: 0.18 km^{2} (0.069 sq mi)
- Elevation: 506.6 m (1,662 ft)

Population (2002)
  - Total: 33
- Postal code: 1315

Kukmaka (pronounced [ˈkuːkmaka]) is a small settlement south of Rašica in the Municipality of Velike Lašče in central Slovenia. The area is part of the traditional region of Lower Carniola. It is included in the Central Slovenia Statistical Region.
