= Mala Slevica =

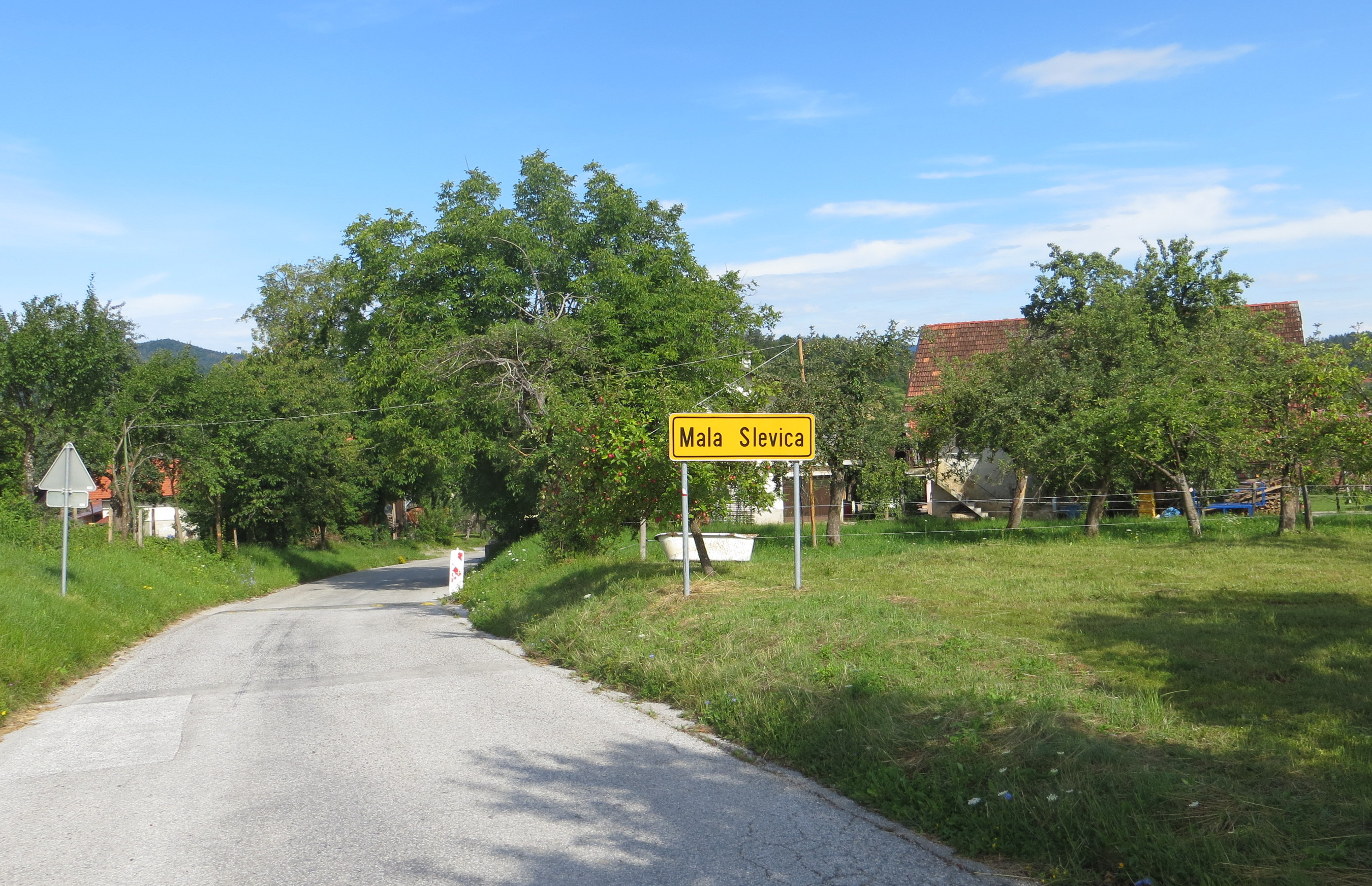

- Location in Slovenia
- Coordinates: 45°48′32.08″N 14°37′39.01″E
- Country: Slovenia
- Traditional region: Lower Carniola
- Statistical region: Central Slovenia
- Municipality: Velike Lašče

Area
  - Total: 1.26 km^{2} (0.49 sq mi)
- Elevation: 596.3 m (1,956 ft)

Population (2002)
  - Total: 160
- Postal code: 1315

Mala Slevica (pronounced [ˈmaːla ˈsleːʋitsa]; in older sources also Mala Slivica, German: Kleinsliwitz) is a settlement south of Velike Lašče in central Slovenia. The entire Municipality of Velike Lašče is part of the traditional region of Lower Carniola and is now included in the Central Slovenia Statistical Region.

== Name ==
Mala Slevica was attested in historical sources as Zilowiz in 1230, Syloycz in 1335, Silewecz in 1346, and Czylowecz in 1436, among other spellings.

== History ==
The village was formerly located at a higher elevation, at Sela Hill (633 meters or 2,077 feet) northwest of the current village core. It was later relocated to its current site at a crossroads, where a gallows stood in the 12th century.

== Church ==
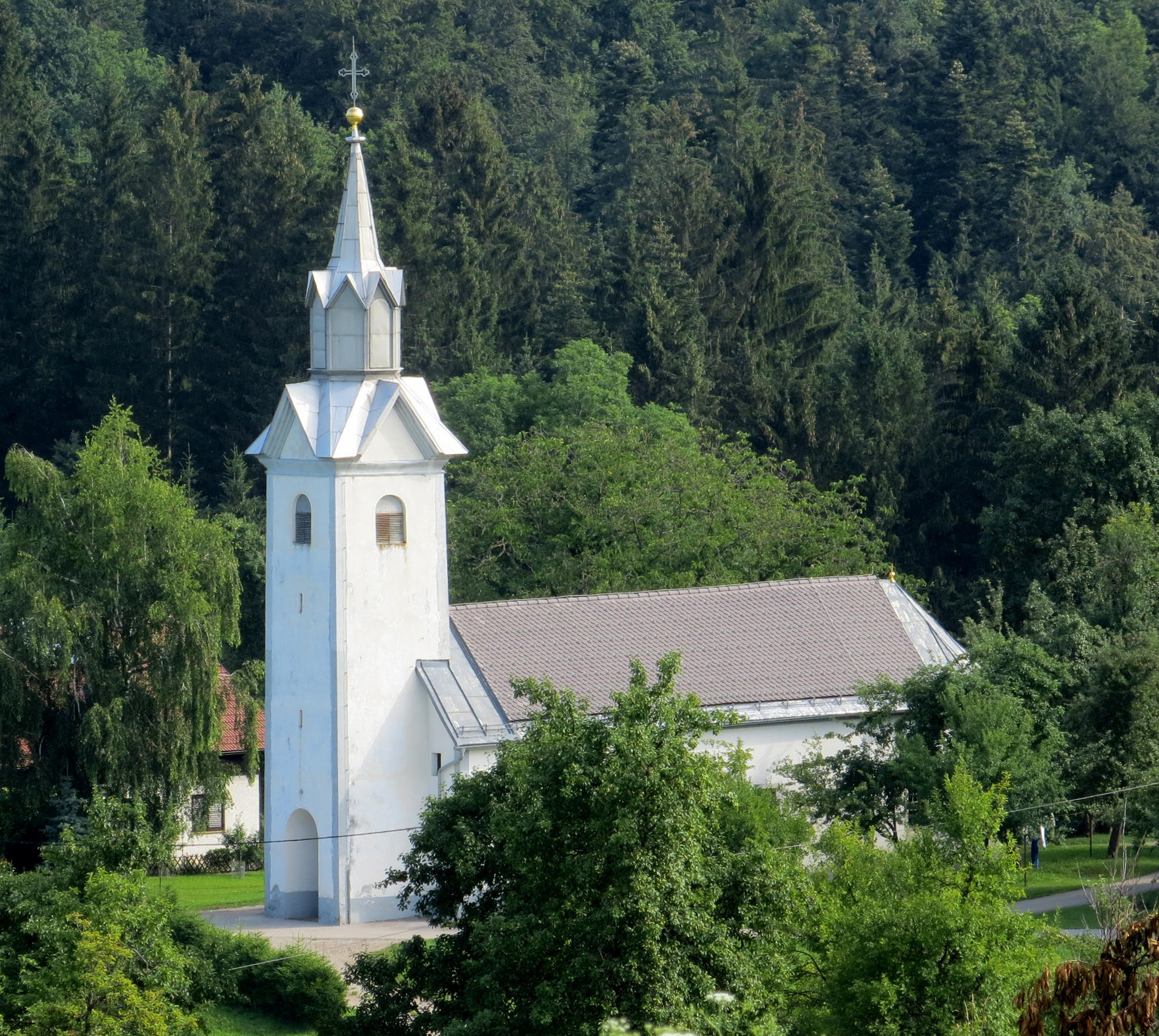
Saint James' Church

The local church, built in the hamlet of Hrastinjaki in the settlement, is dedicated to Saint James (Slovene: sveti Jakob) and belongs to the Parish of Velike Lašče. It is a Baroque building, dating to the mid-17th century.
