= Polzelo =

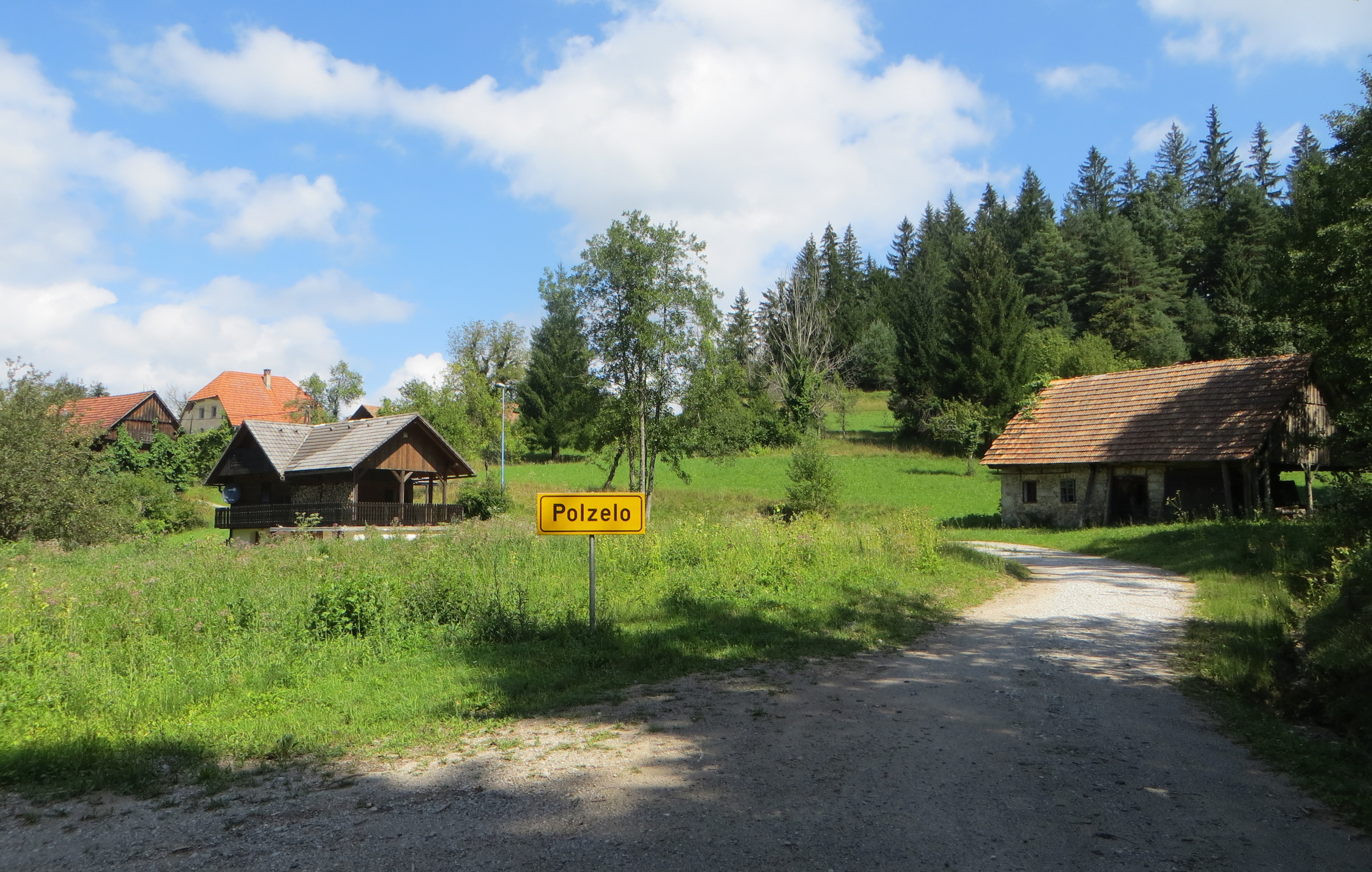

- Location in Slovenia
- Coordinates: 45°48′58.73″N 14°36′28.41″E
- Country: Slovenia
- Traditional region: Lower Carniola
- Statistical region: Central Slovenia
- Municipality: Velike Lašče

Area
  - Total: 0.27 km^{2} (0.10 sq mi)
- Elevation: 516.5 m (1,695 ft)

Population (2014)
  - Total: 1
  - Density: 4/km^{2} (10/sq mi)
- Postal code: 1385

Polzelo (pronounced [pɔu̯ˈzeːlɔ], German: Pouselo) is a small settlement on a small hill above the Mišja Valley (Slovene: Mišja dolina) southwest of Velike Lašče in central Slovenia. The entire Municipality of Velike Lašče is part of the traditional region of Lower Carniola and is now included in the Central Slovenia Statistical Region.
