= Tomažini =

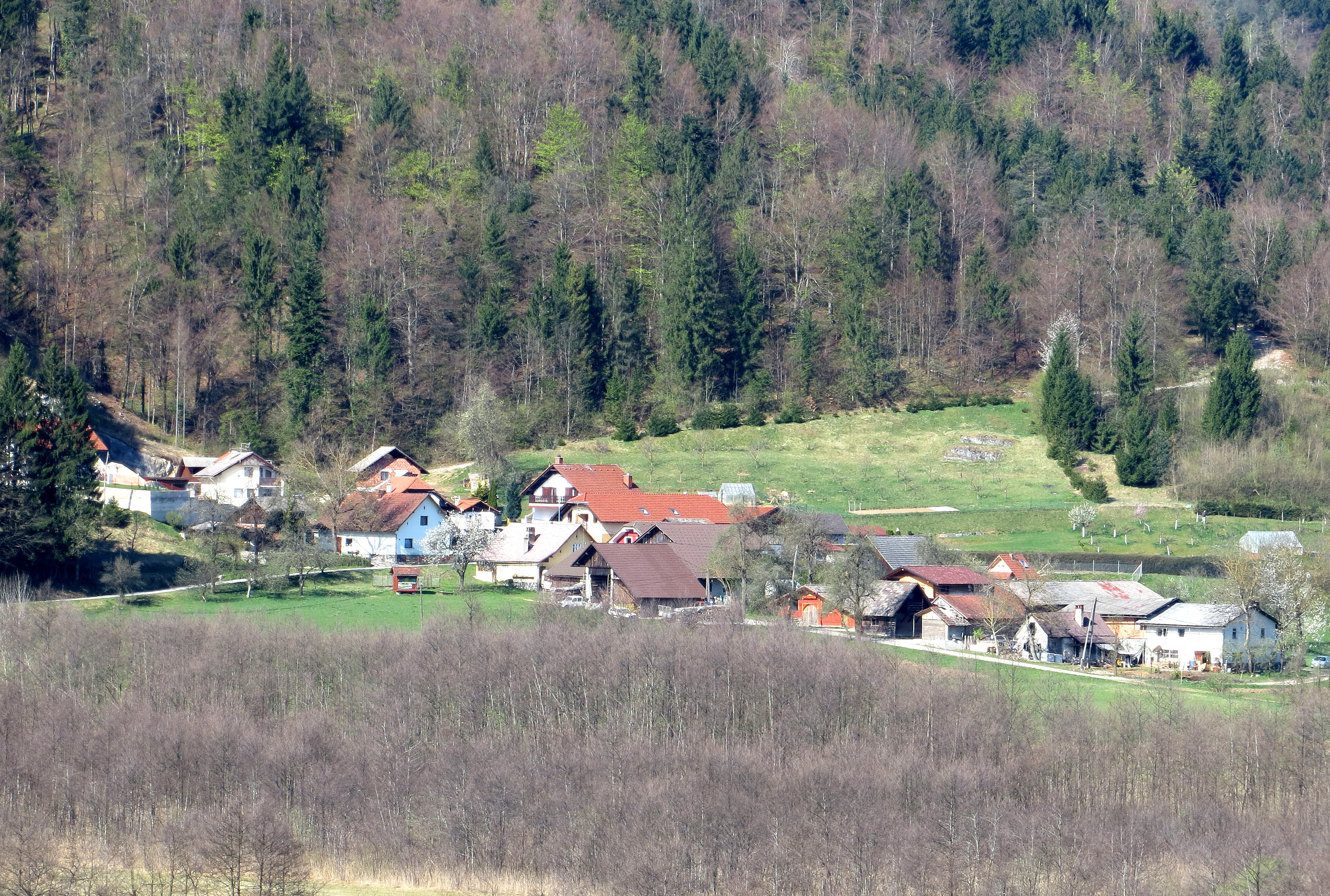

- Location in Slovenia
- Coordinates: 45°50′12.93″N 14°35′4.01″E
- Country: Slovenia
- Traditional region: Lower Carniola
- Statistical region: Central Slovenia
- Municipality: Velike Lašče

Area
  - Total: 0.49 km^{2} (0.19 sq mi)
- Elevation: 509.3 m (1,671 ft)

Population (2002)
  - Total: 28
- Postal code: 1314

Tomažini (pronounced [tɔmaˈʒiːni]; in older sources also Tomažin) is a small settlement at the northern end of the Mišja Valley (Slovene: Mišja dolina) southwest of Rašica in the Municipality of Velike Lašče in central Slovenia. The area is part of the traditional region of Lower Carniola and is now included in the Central Slovenia Statistical Region.

== Name ==
The name Tomažini is a collective toponym, referring to a settlement where several people with the surname Tomažin lived.
