= Podkogelj =

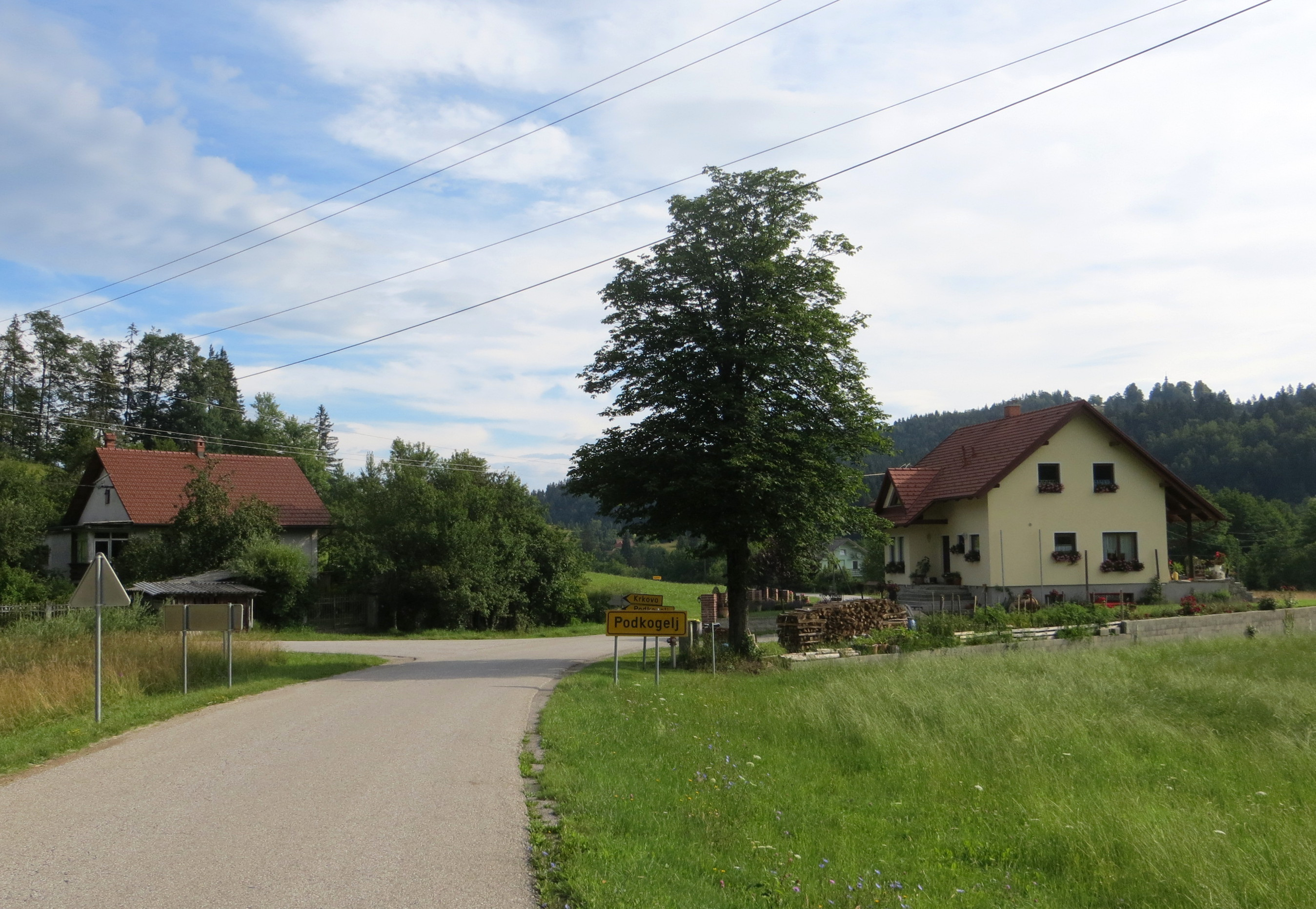

- Location in Slovenia
- Coordinates: 45°48′37.56″N 14°35′57.06″E
- Country: Slovenia
- Traditional region: Lower Carniola
- Statistical region: Central Slovenia
- Municipality: Velike Lašče

Area
  - Total: 0.53 km^{2} (0.20 sq mi)
- Elevation: 549.3 m (1,802 ft)

Population (2002)
  - Total: 16
- Postal code: 1315

Podkogelj (pronounced [pɔtˈkoːɡəl]; German: Podkogel) is a small settlement in the Municipality of Velike Lašče in central Slovenia. It is part of the traditional region of Lower Carniola and is now included in the Central Slovenia Statistical Region.

== Name ==
Podkogel was attested in written sources as Kogol in 1436 and Gugalitsch in 1484, among other names. The name is a fused prepositional phrase that has lost case inflection, from pod 'below' + kogel 'rounded peak'. In this case, it refers to the settlement's location below Kogelj Hill (elevation 600 meters or 2,000 feet), which rises northeast of the village.
