= Borovec pri Karlovici =

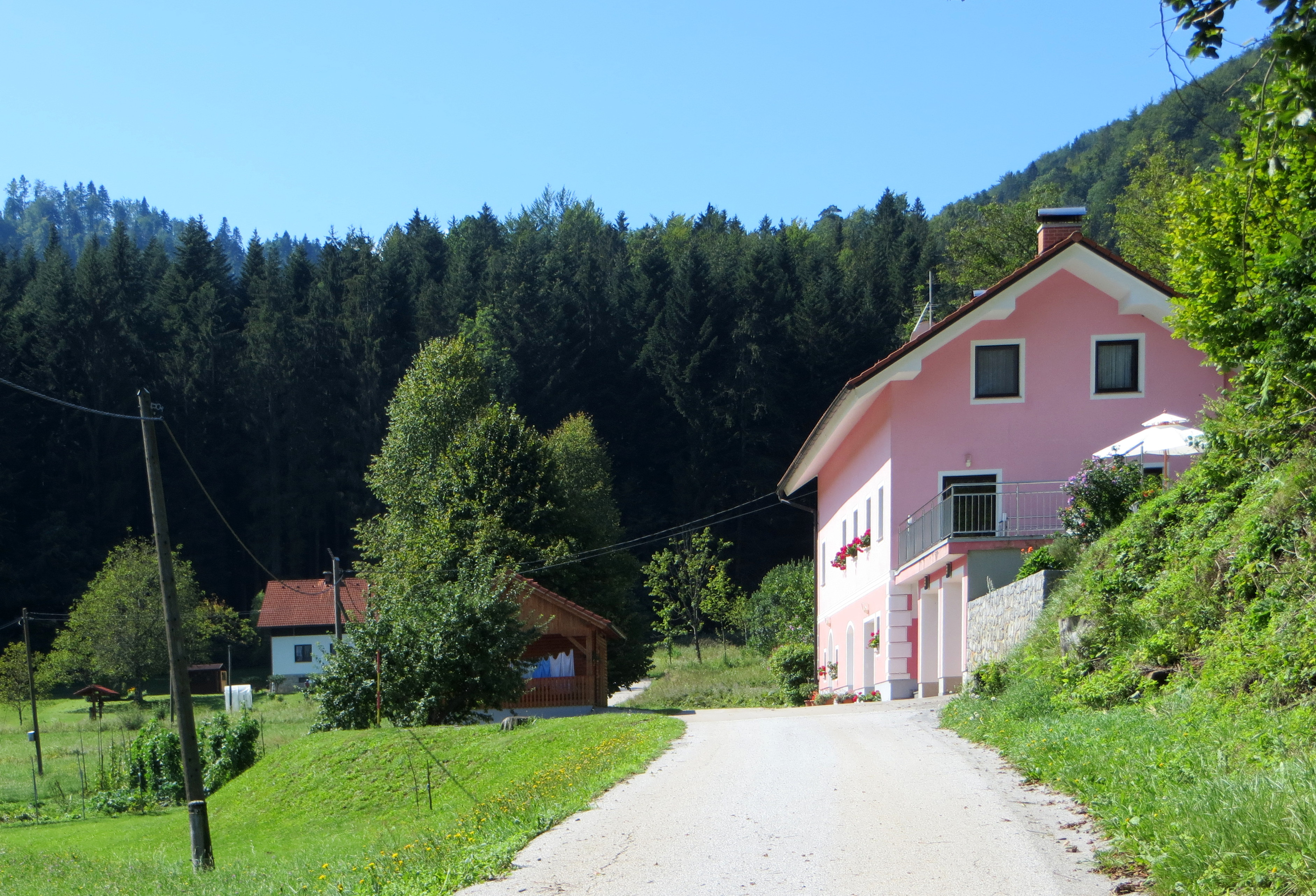

- Location in Slovenia
- Coordinates: 45°48′2.5″N 14°35′34.16″E
- Country: Slovenia
- Traditional region: Lower Carniola
- Statistical region: Central Slovenia
- Municipality: Velike Lašče

Area
  - Total: 1.45 km^{2} (0.56 sq mi)
- Elevation: 544.6 m (1,787 ft)

Population (2002)
  - Total: 3
- Postal code: 1315

Borovec pri Karlovici (pronounced [bɔˈɾɔːʋəts pɾi ˈkaːɾlɔʋitʃi] or [bɔˈɾoːʋəts pɾi ˈkaːɾlɔʋitʃi]) is a small settlement in the Municipality of Velike Lašče in the traditional region of Lower Carniola in central Slovenia. The area is now included in the Central Slovenia Statistical Region.

== Name ==
The name of the settlement was changed from Borovec to Borovec pri Karlovici in 1953.
