= Jakičevo =

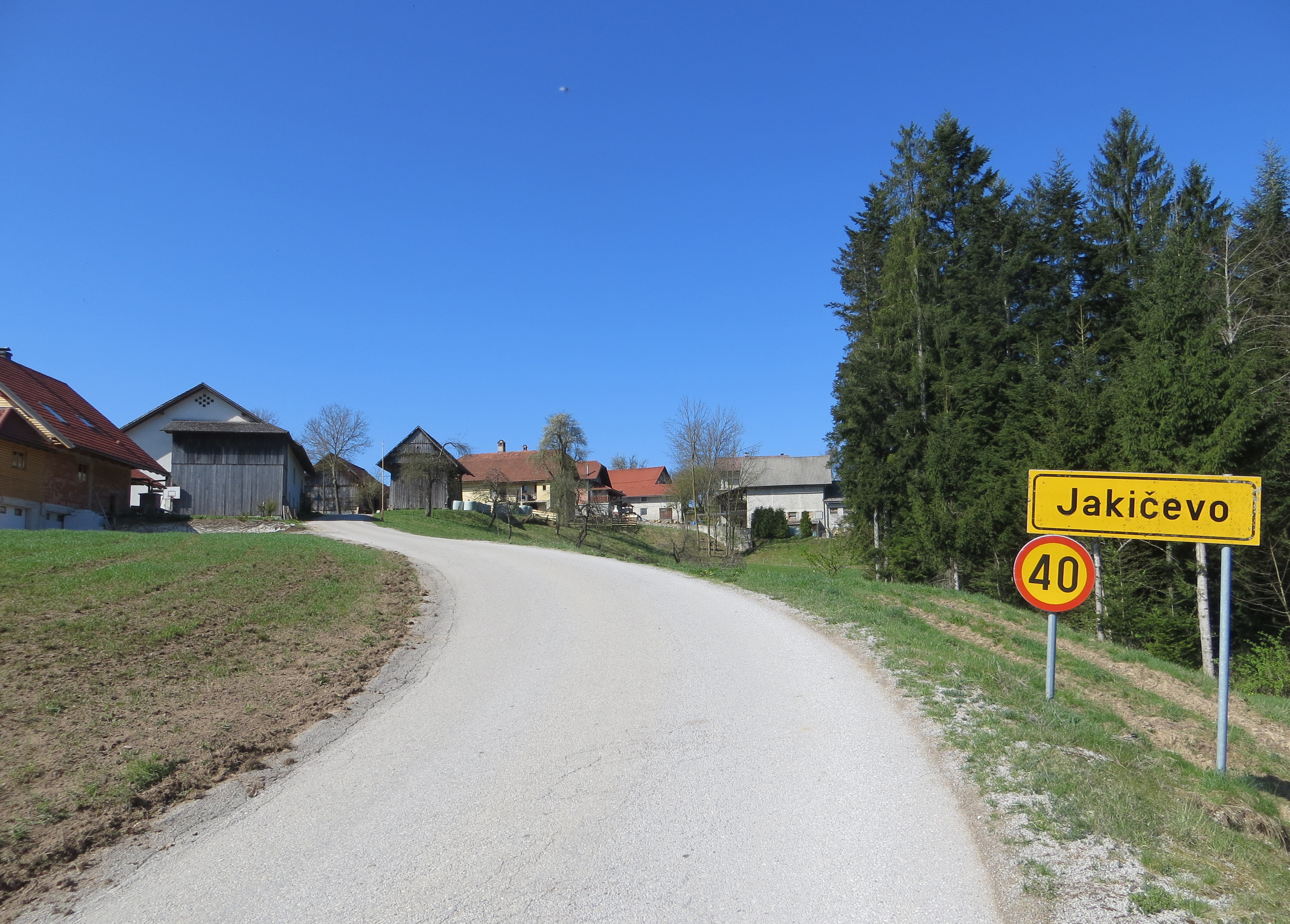

- Location in Slovenia
- Coordinates: 45°50′35.35″N 14°36′56.47″E
- Country: Slovenia
- Traditional region: Lower Carniola
- Statistical region: Central Slovenia
- Municipality: Velike Lašče

Area
  - Total: 0.24 km^{2} (0.093 sq mi)
- Elevation: 510.2 m (1,674 ft)

Population (2002)
  - Total: 21
- Postal code: 1315

Jakičevo (pronounced [jaˈkiːtʃɛʋɔ]) is a small settlement northwest of Velike Lašče in central Slovenia. The area is part of the traditional region of Lower Carniola and is now included in the Central Slovenia Statistical Region.

There is a small wayside shrine dedicated to the Virgin Mary east of the village. It dates to the last quarter of the 18th century.
