= Podhojni Hrib =

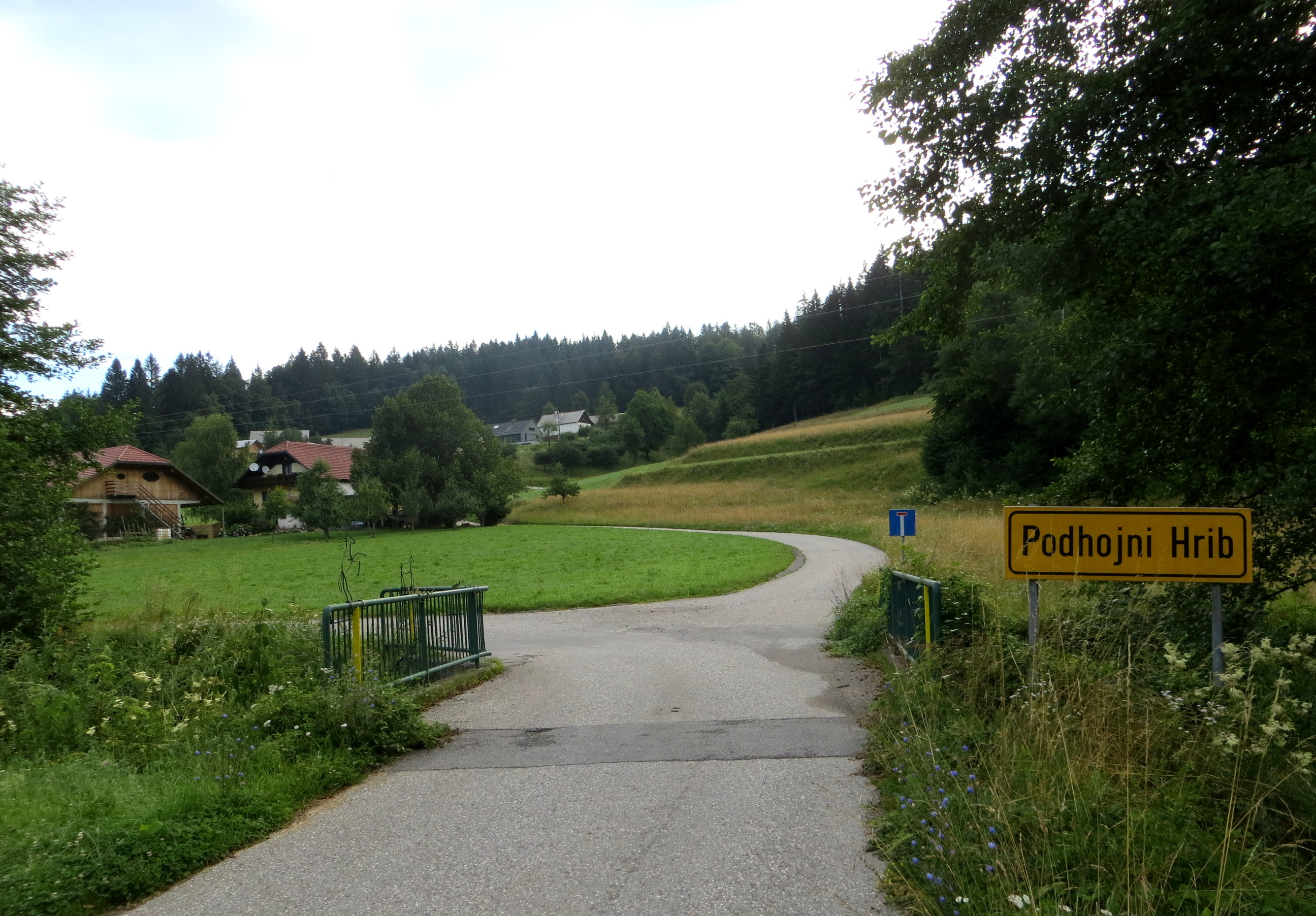

- Location in Slovenia
- Coordinates: 45°51′15.33″N 14°34′30.18″E
- Country: Slovenia
- Traditional region: Lower Carniola
- Statistical region: Central Slovenia
- Municipality: Velike Lašče

Area
  - Total: 0.75 km^{2} (0.29 sq mi)
- Elevation: 543.5 m (1,783 ft)

Population (2002)
  - Total: 37
- Postal code: 1314

Podhojni Hrib (pronounced [pɔtˈxoːi̯ni ˈxɾiːp]) is a settlement immediately north of Rob in the Municipality of Velike Lašče in central Slovenia. The entire municipality is part of the traditional region of Lower Carniola and is now included in the Central Slovenia Statistical Region.
