= Opalkovo =

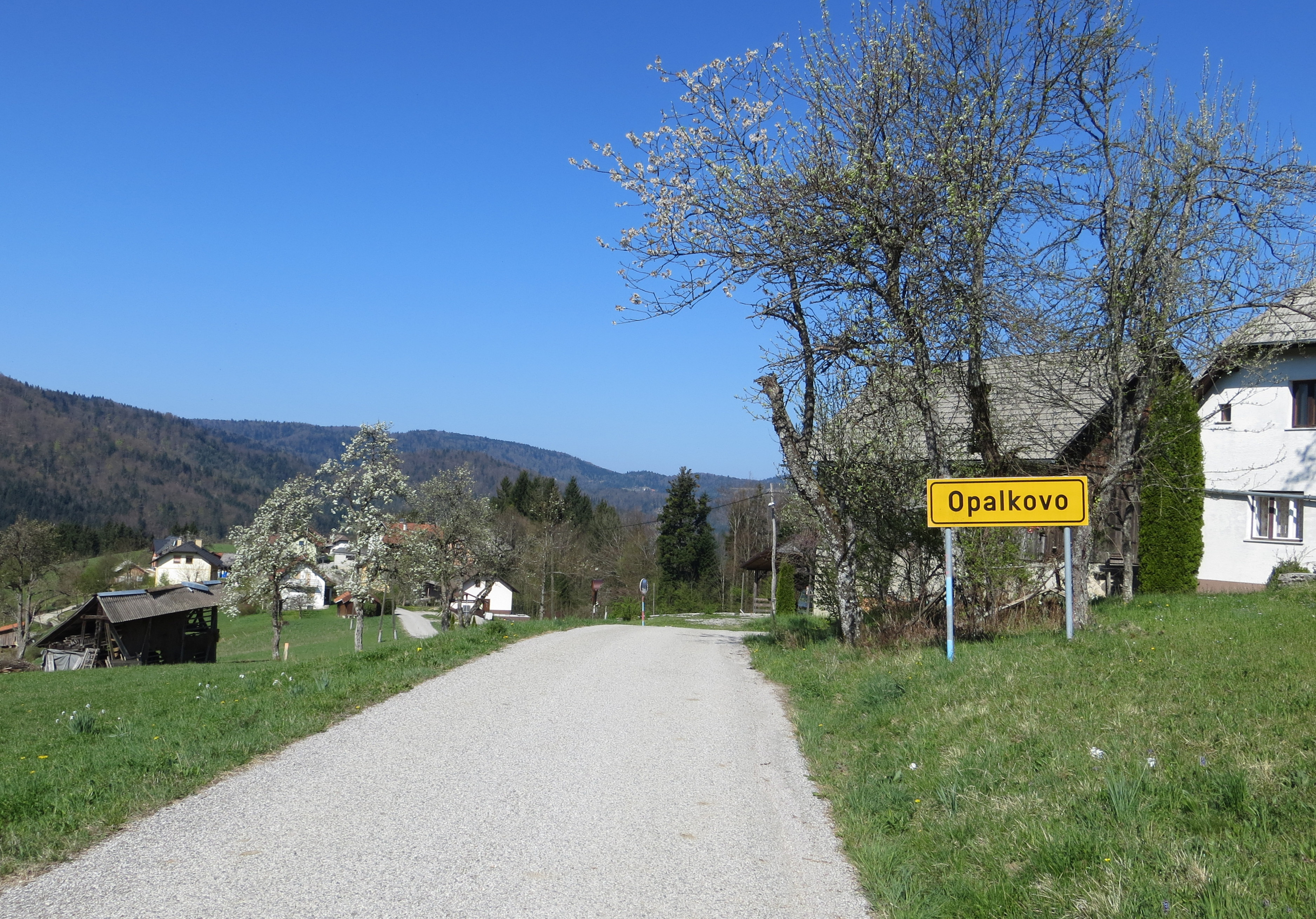

- Location in Slovenia
- Coordinates: 45°50′11.24″N 14°36′14″E
- Country: Slovenia
- Traditional region: Lower Carniola
- Statistical region: Central Slovenia
- Municipality: Velike Lašče

Area
  - Total: 0.54 km^{2} (0.21 sq mi)
- Elevation: 584.9 m (1,919 ft)

Population (2002)
  - Total: 23
- Postal code: 1315

Opalkovo (pronounced [ɔˈpaːlkɔʋɔ]) is a small settlement west of Velike Lašče in central Slovenia. The entire Municipality of Velike Lašče is included in the Central Slovenia Statistical Region and is part of the traditional region of Lower Carniola.

== Name ==
The name Opalkovo is derived from the verb opaliti 'to singe, burn off', referring to land that was cleared for settlement.
