= Podstrmec =

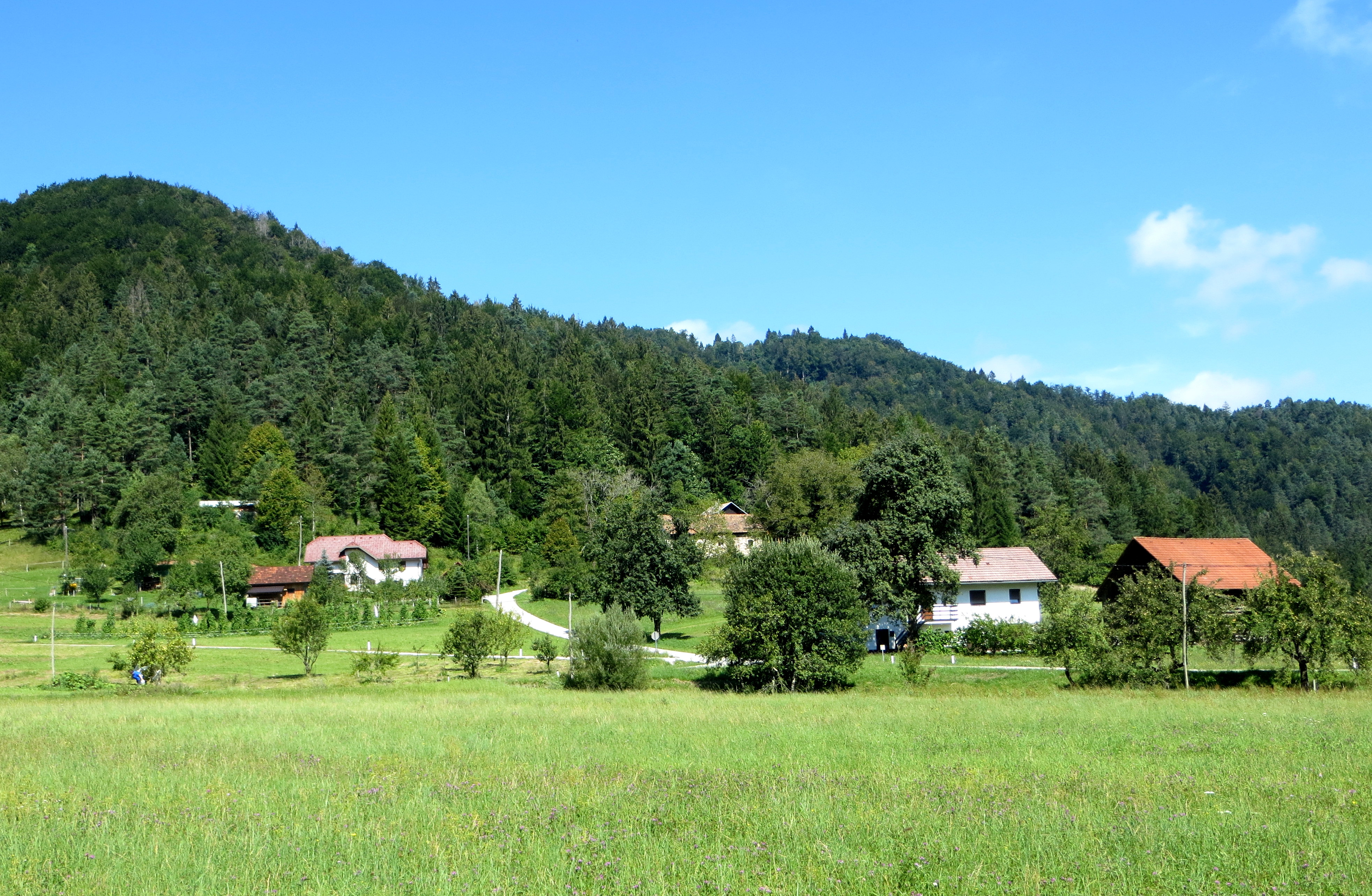

- Location in Slovenia
- Coordinates: 45°48′19.38″N 14°34′16.69″E
- Country: Slovenia
- Traditional region: Lower Carniola
- Statistical region: Central Slovenia
- Municipality: Velike Lašče

Area
  - Total: 1.84 km^{2} (0.71 sq mi)
- Elevation: 588.3 m (1,930 ft)

Population (2002)
  - Total: 23
- Postal code: 1315

Podstrmec (pronounced [pɔtˈstəɾməts]) is a dispersed settlement southwest of Velike Lašče in Slovenia. The entire Municipality of Velike Lašče is part of the traditional region of Lower Carniola and is now included in the Central Slovenia Statistical Region.
