= Draga, Ig =

Draga
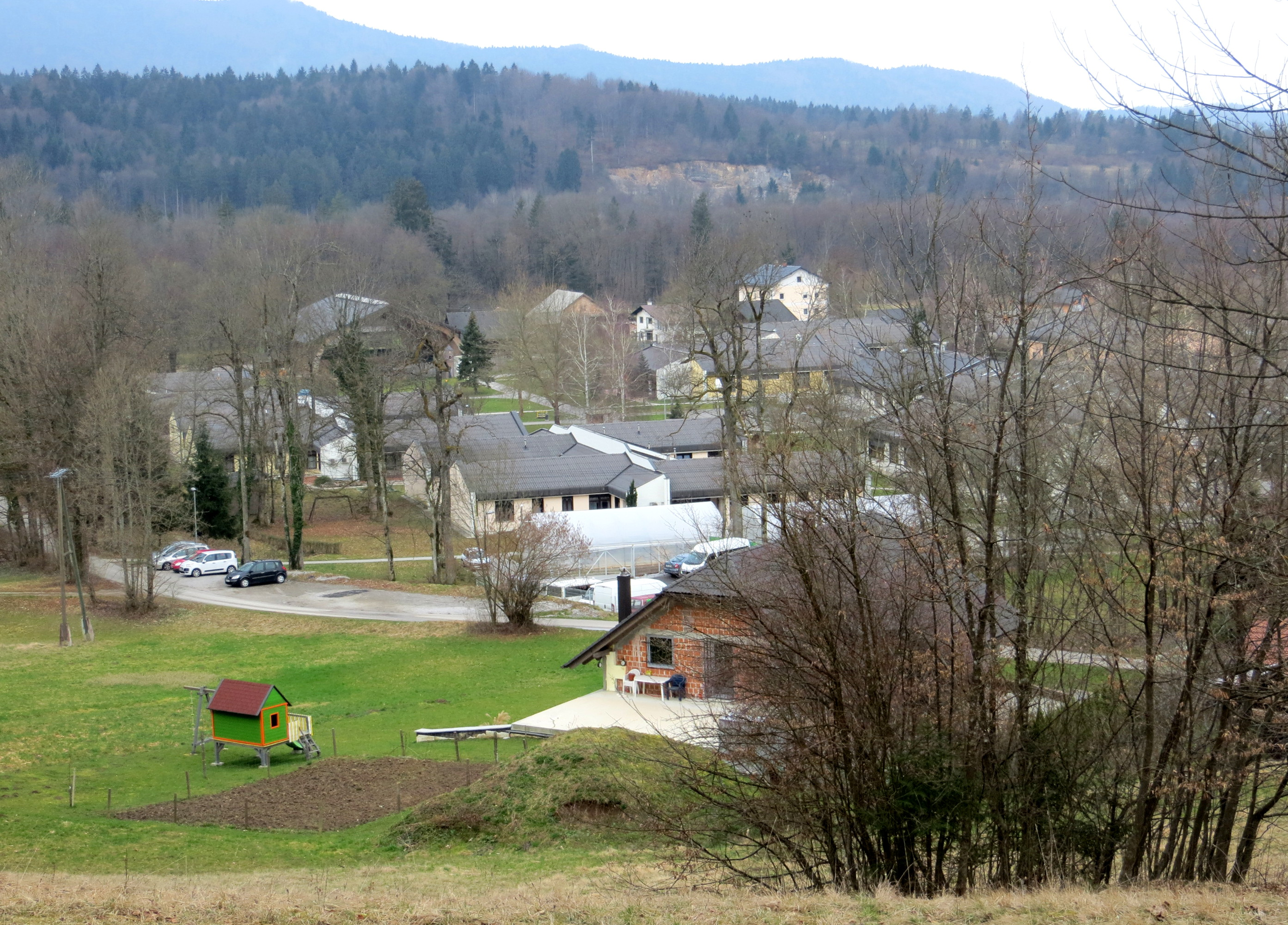

- Location in Slovenia
- Coordinates: 45°56′48.78″N 14°32′52.42″E
- Country: Slovenia
- Traditional region: Inner Carniola
- Statistical region: Central Slovenia
- Municipality: Ig

Area
  - Total: 1.9 km^{2} (0.73 sq mi)

Population (2013)
  - Total: 194
  - Density: 101/km^{2} (260/sq mi)

Draga (pronounced [ˈdɾaːɡa]) is a small village in the Municipality of Ig in southeastern Slovenia. Until 2007, the area was part of the settlements of Dobravica and Sarsko. The village is part of the traditional region of Inner Carniola and is included in the Central Slovenia Statistical Region.

== Name ==
The name Draga is derived from the Slovene common noun draga 'small, narrow valley', referring to the geographical location of the settlement.
