= Minca Krkovič =

Slovenian field labourer and folk singer (1858–1933)

Minca Krkovič – Minca Hatova
- Born: Minca Krkovič; June 2, 1858; Vrh pri Fari, Austrian Empire
- Died: April 13, 1933 (aged 84); Hrib pri Fari, Kingdom of Yugoslavia
- Occupations: field labourer, folk singer

Minca Krkovič, also known as Minca Hatova, (2 June 1858–13 April 1933) was a Slovenian field labourer and folk singer. Most of the folk songs of Kostel have been preserved through her.

== Childhood ==
She was born on 2 June 1858 into a Slovenian family in Vrh pri Fari, at a house known as "pri Liščevih". Her mother was the innkeeper and grocer Neža Lisac (1827–1894) from Vrh pri Fari, and her father was the innkeeper and grocer Jože Krkovič (1819–1894) from Selnik. She had one older and one younger sister. In his youth, her father had probably worked in Hungary, where he picked up the frequent conversational use of the Hungarian word "hat", meaning "so, then, well". Because of this he acquired the nickname "Hat", and his daughters became known as "Hatove" (Hat girls). Her parents were uneducated and unable to calculate accounts, and therefore managed the inn poorly, which led to its failure. Shortly thereafter, their grocery was robbed. They were forced to sell their house and land, move into a small hut, and support themselves through field labour on other farms. Minca did not attend school and remained illiterate throughout her life.

== Work ==
In her youth she began working as a field labourer on farms in her village, and she earned her living with that until old age. For a time she was also employed as a maid by nuns at Mary’s Home in Kočevje. In 1894 both of her parents died. Her older sister went to work as a maidservant in Brod na Kupi, where she later died. Her younger sister, also a field labourer, married, and Minca visited her often. She strongly wished to marry, for which she was often mocked by the village youth. She sang a all the time and knew hundreds of different songs. In her youth she learned many songs from elderly women in the village, and some Catholic devotional songs from the nuns for whom she worked. When she became too weak and was no longer able to work in the fields, she was placed among the municipal poor of the Municipality of Kostel, since her younger sister had moved away and could no longer care for her. Each household in the municipality was required to provide her with food and lodging for one day. People were fond of having her stay with them, as she was tidy, performed light tasks such as shelling beans, sang songs, and told fairy tales to children. She was often kept at the same house for several days at a time. She taught many children and young women to sing old songs and ballads that would otherwise have fallen into oblivion. Among the ballads preserved thanks to her is the Kostel version of the Ballad of the Revenge of the Abandoned Lover. According to the people of Kostel, all the old songs they remembered had been learned from her.

== Later life and death ==
In old age she became very small and frail. She never married and had no children. She died on Maundy Thursday, 13 April 1933, in the village of Hrib pri Fari. She was buried the following day, on Good Friday. Because, according to old custom, church bells fall silent during the last days of Holy Week, there was no ringing at her funeral, only the sound of wooden rattles.
