= Podgozd, Ig =

Podgozd
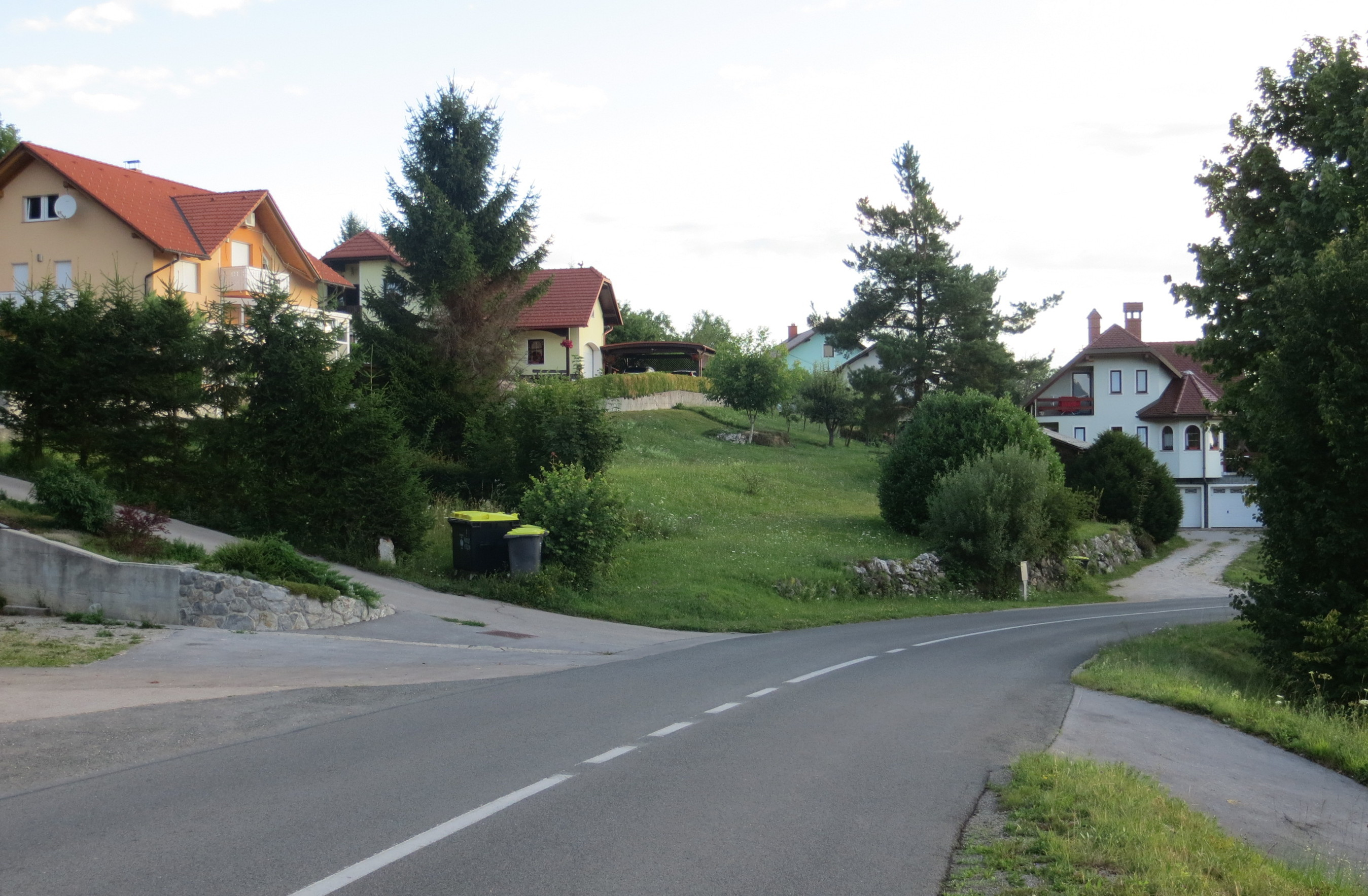

- Location in Slovenia
- Coordinates: 45°55′52.21″N 14°32′15.91″E
- Country: Slovenia
- Traditional region: Inner Carniola
- Statistical region: Central Slovenia
- Municipality: Ig

Area
  - Total: 1.9 km^{2} (0.73 sq mi)

Population (2024)
  - Total: 128
  - Density: 67/km^{2} (170/sq mi)

Podgozd (pronounced [pɔdˈɡɔst]) is a small village in the Municipality of Ig in southeastern Slovenia. Until 2007, the area was part of the settlement of Dobravica. The village is part of the traditional region of Inner Carniola and is included in the Central Slovenia Statistical Region.

== History ==
Podgozd was formally established as an independent settlement in 2007, when it was separated from the territory of Dobravica. Prior to this it was a hamlet of Dobravica.
