= Zapotok, Ig =

Zapotok
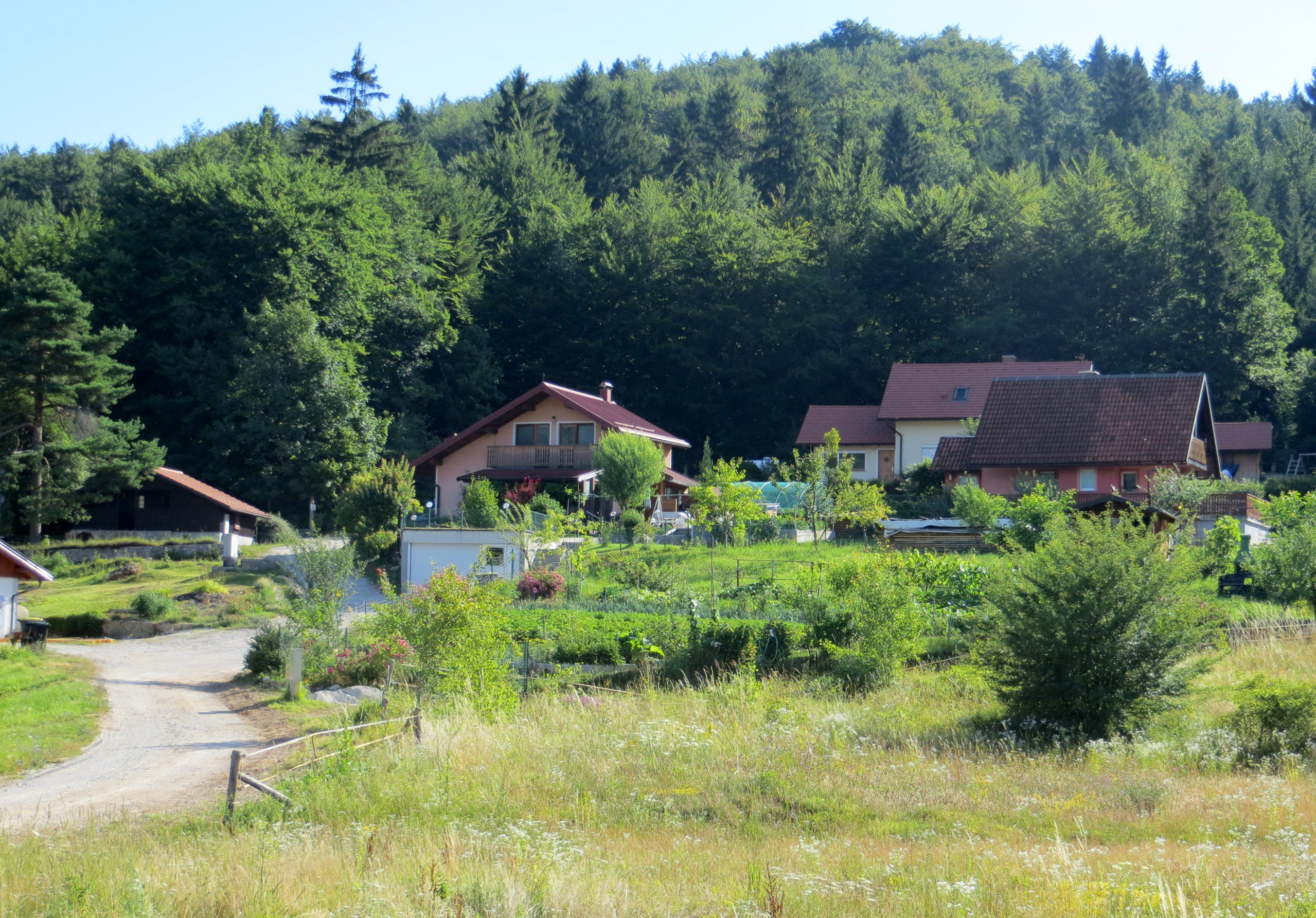

- Location in Slovenia
- Coordinates: 45°52′34.65″N 14°34′19.83″E
- Country: Slovenia
- Traditional region: Inner Carniola
- Statistical region: Central Slovenia
- Municipality: Ig

Area
  - Total: 4.53 km^{2} (1.75 sq mi)
- Elevation: 631.6 m (2,072 ft)

Population (2002)
  - Total: 116
- Postal code: 1292

Zapotok (pronounced [zaˈpɔːtɔk]; German: Sapotok) is a village in the hills south of Ig in central Slovenia. The entire Municipality of Ig is part of the traditional region of Inner Carniola and is now included in the Central Slovenia Statistical Region.

== History ==
During the Second World War, Italian forces burned the village on March 19, 1942. On July 23, 1942, Italian forces shot fourteen men as hostages in Zapotok; they are all buried at the cemetery on Kurešček Hill in Visoko. After the war, a collective farm was established in Zapotok. It was initially used to raise cattle, then to produce plastic for a year, then converted into a factory for wooden ware, and finally into a poultry feedlot.

=== Mass grave ===
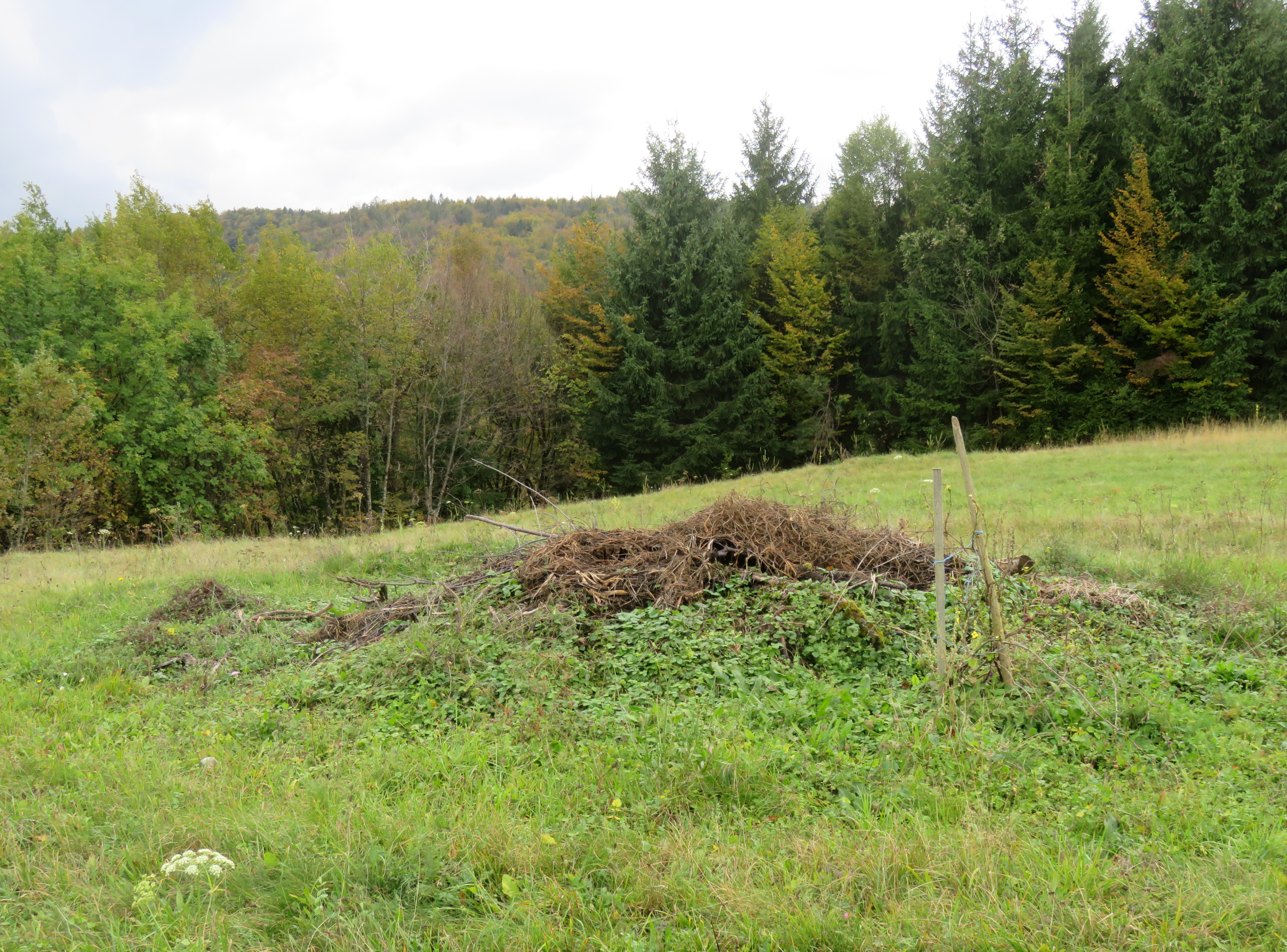
The Zapotok Narrow Shaft Mass Grave

Zapotok is the site of a mass grave associated with the Second World War. The Zapotok Narrow Shaft Mass Grave (Slovene: Grobišče Ozko brezno pri Zapotoku), also known as the Viper Cave Mass Grave (Grobišče Gadova jama), is located on the wooded slope of a steep valley 10 meters (33 ft) south of the road between Zapotok and Četež pri Turjaku. It contains the remains of unknown victims.
