= Vrbljene =

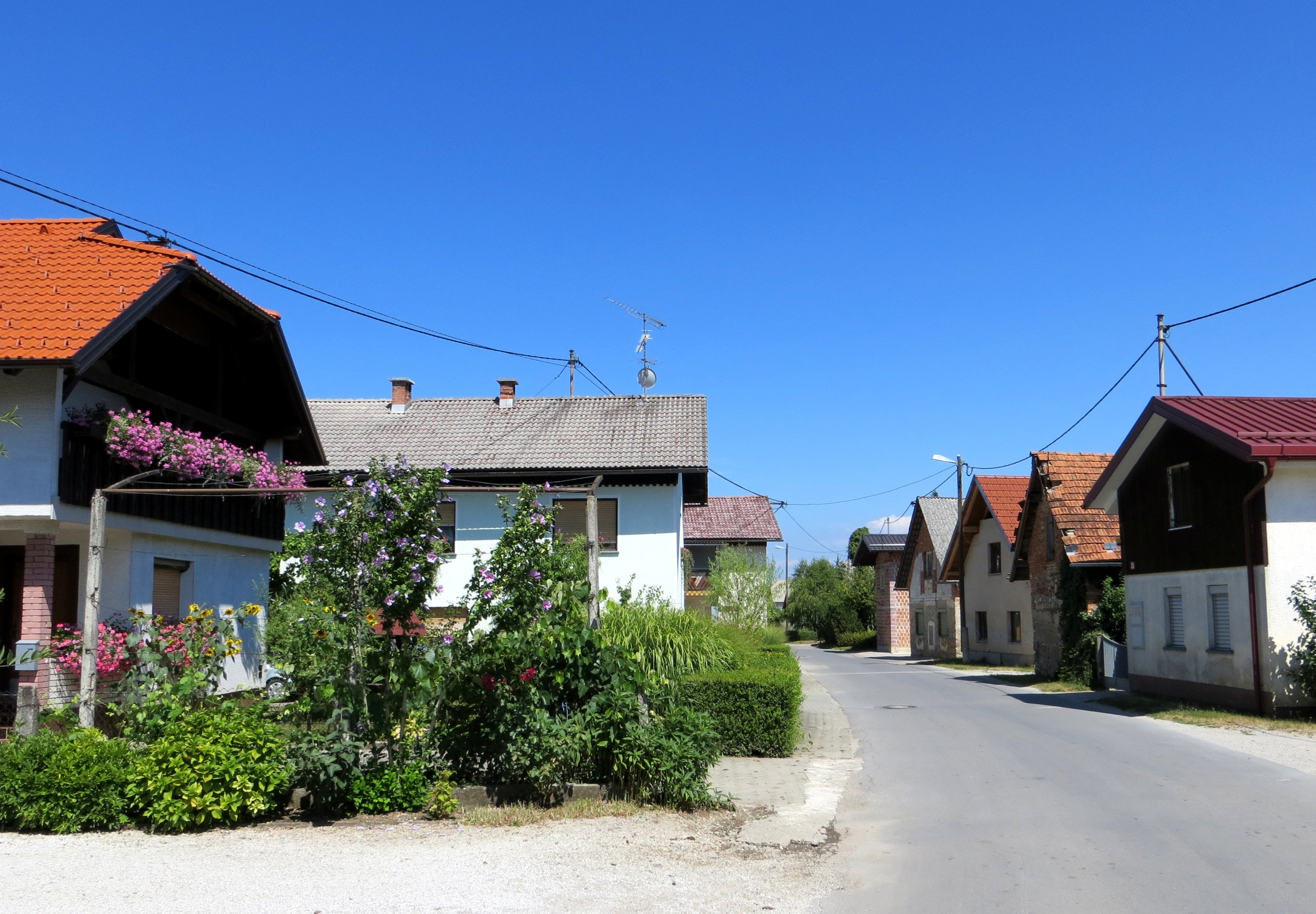

- Location in Slovenia
- Coordinates: 45°57′6.19″N 14°29′24.26″E
- Country: Slovenia
- Traditional region: Inner Carniola
- Statistical region: Central Slovenia
- Municipality: Ig

Area
  - Total: 2.78 km^{2} (1.07 sq mi)
- Elevation: 306.3 m (1,005 ft)

Population (2002)
  - Total: 201
- Postal code: 1292

Vrbljene (pronounced [ˈʋəɾbljɛnɛ], in older sources also Vrbljane, German: Werblene) is a village south of Tomišelj in the Municipality of Ig in central Slovenia. The municipality is part of the traditional region of Inner Carniola and is now included in the Central Slovenia Statistical Region.

== Name ==
Vrbljene was attested in written sources in 1323 as Verblach (and as Werbliach in 1385 and Warblach in 1444). The name is derived from *Vrbljane, an accusative plural demonym meaning 'people living in the settlement of Vrba', which in turn is derived from the Slovene common noun vrba 'willow'. In the local dialect, the settlement is known as Vrbljen.

== History ==
During excavation for a cellar in the village in 1929, a silver coin with the year 1600 was discovered. The Tekstilka factory was established in Vrbljene in 1961. It produced cotton wool for carpeting.

== Notable people ==
Notable people that were born or lived in Vrbljene include:

- Rajko Sedej (a.k.a. Rajmund Srečko) (born 1927), dental prosthetics expert

== Gallery ==
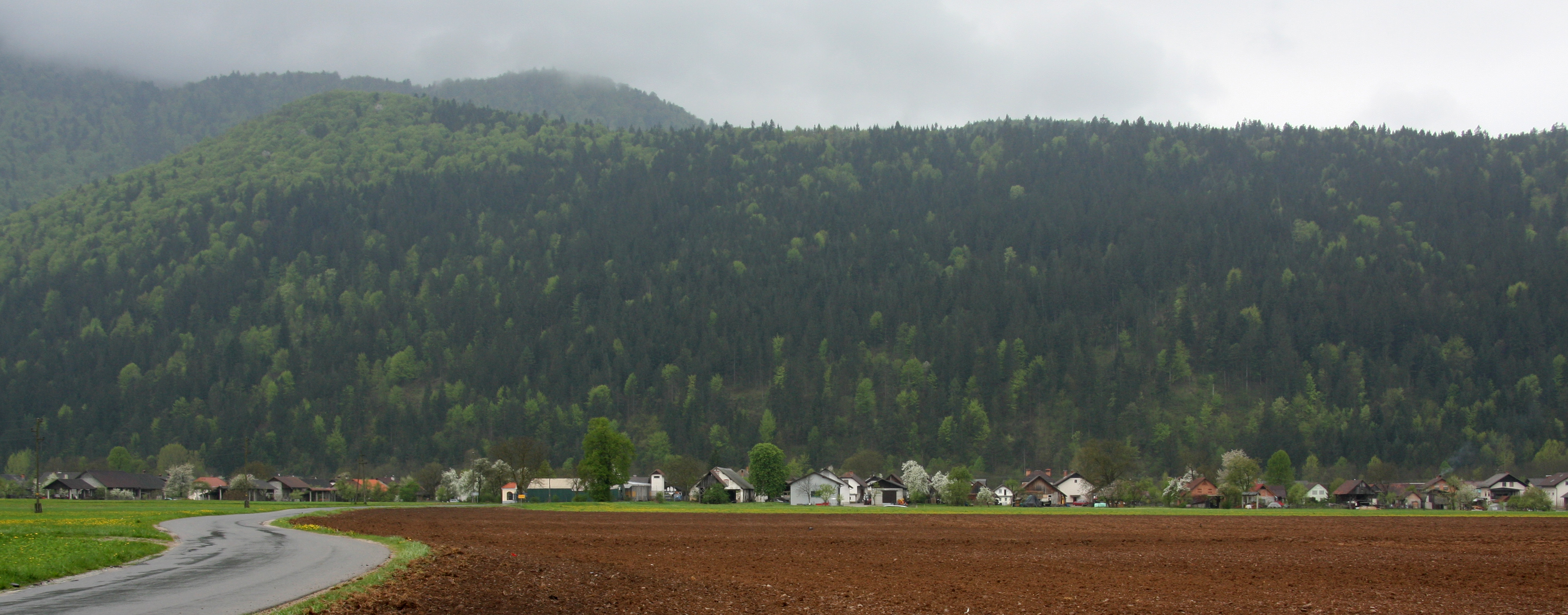
Panorama of Vrbljene
