= Iška Loka =

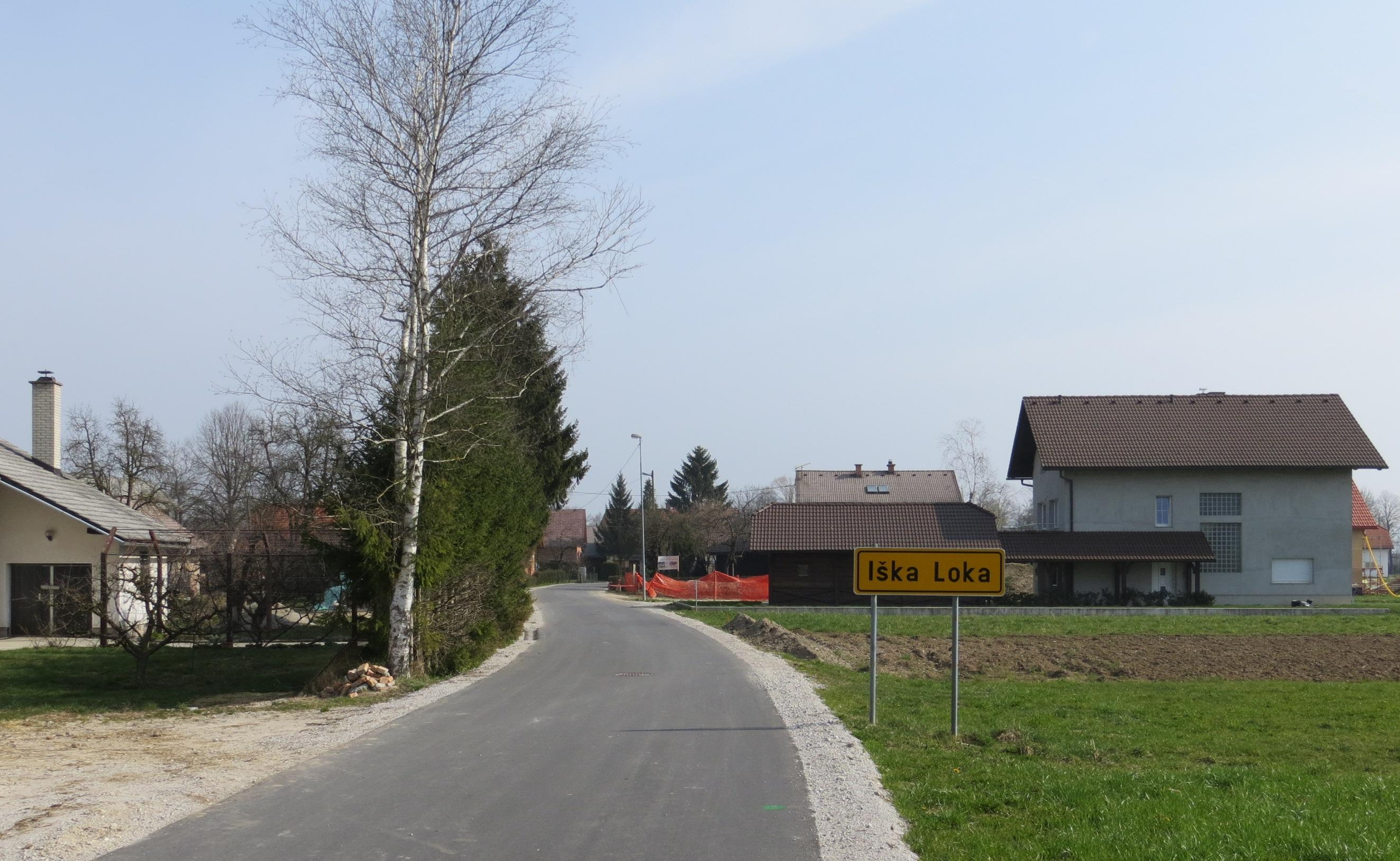

- Location in Slovenia
- Coordinates: 45°58′16.55″N 14°30′54.67″E
- Country: Slovenia
- Traditional region: Inner Carniola
- Statistical region: Central Slovenia
- Municipality: Ig

Area
  - Total: 4.04 km^{2} (1.56 sq mi)
- Elevation: 292.7 m (960 ft)

Population (2002)
  - Total: 262
- Postal code: 1292

Iška Loka (pronounced [ˈiːʃka ˈloːka]; German: Igglack) is a village in the Municipality of Ig in central Slovenia, in the marshes just south of the capital Ljubljana. The entire municipality is part of the traditional region of Inner Carniola and is now included in the Central Slovenia Statistical Region.

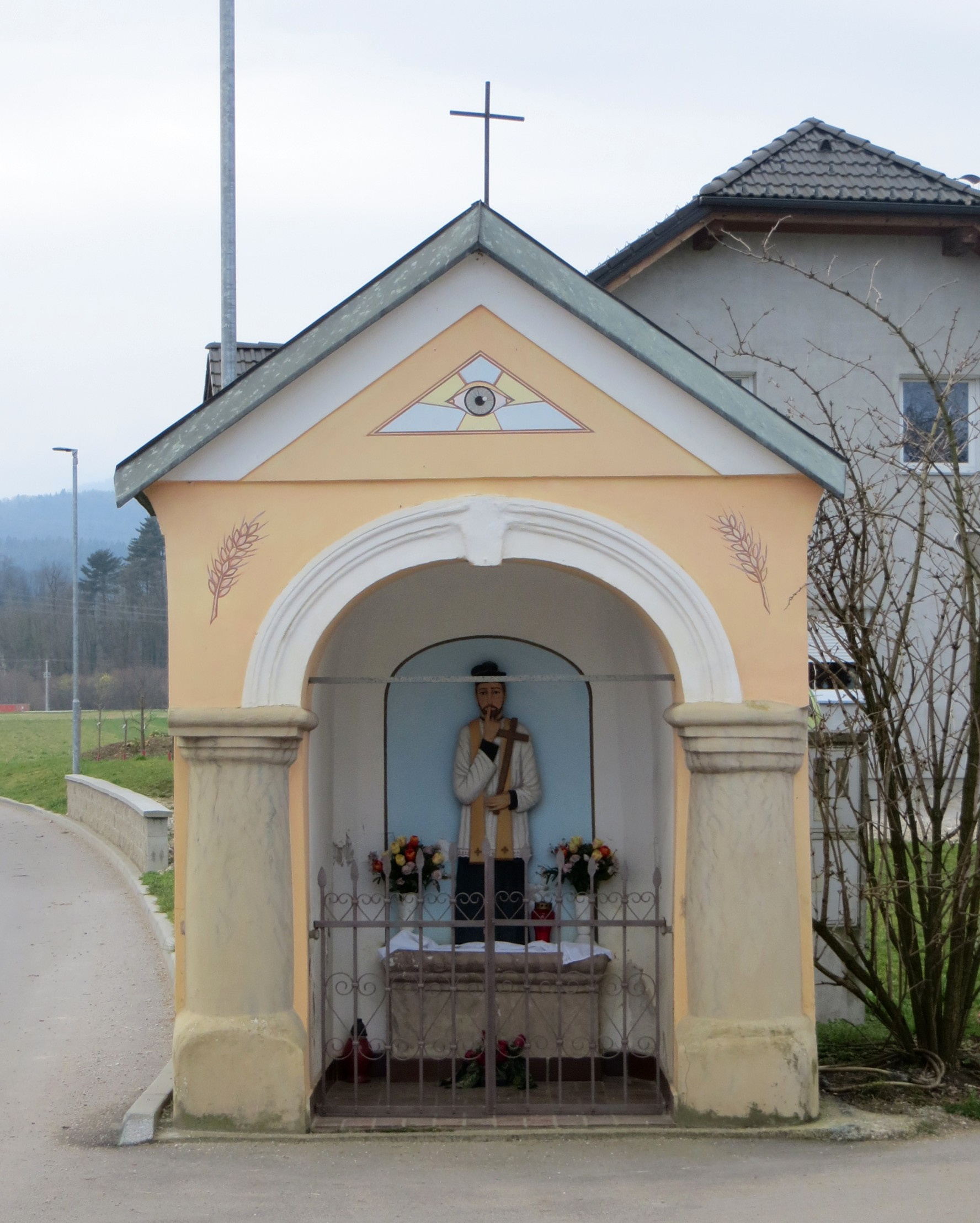
Chapel-shrine

Surface finds of pottery and worked stone tools in the area point to Mesolithic, Chalcolithic, and Early Bronze Age settlement of the area.

At the southern edge of the settlement, at the intersection of roads leading to Ig and Staje, there is a chapel-shrine with an image in relief. It dates from the 19th century.
