= Suša, Ig =

Suša
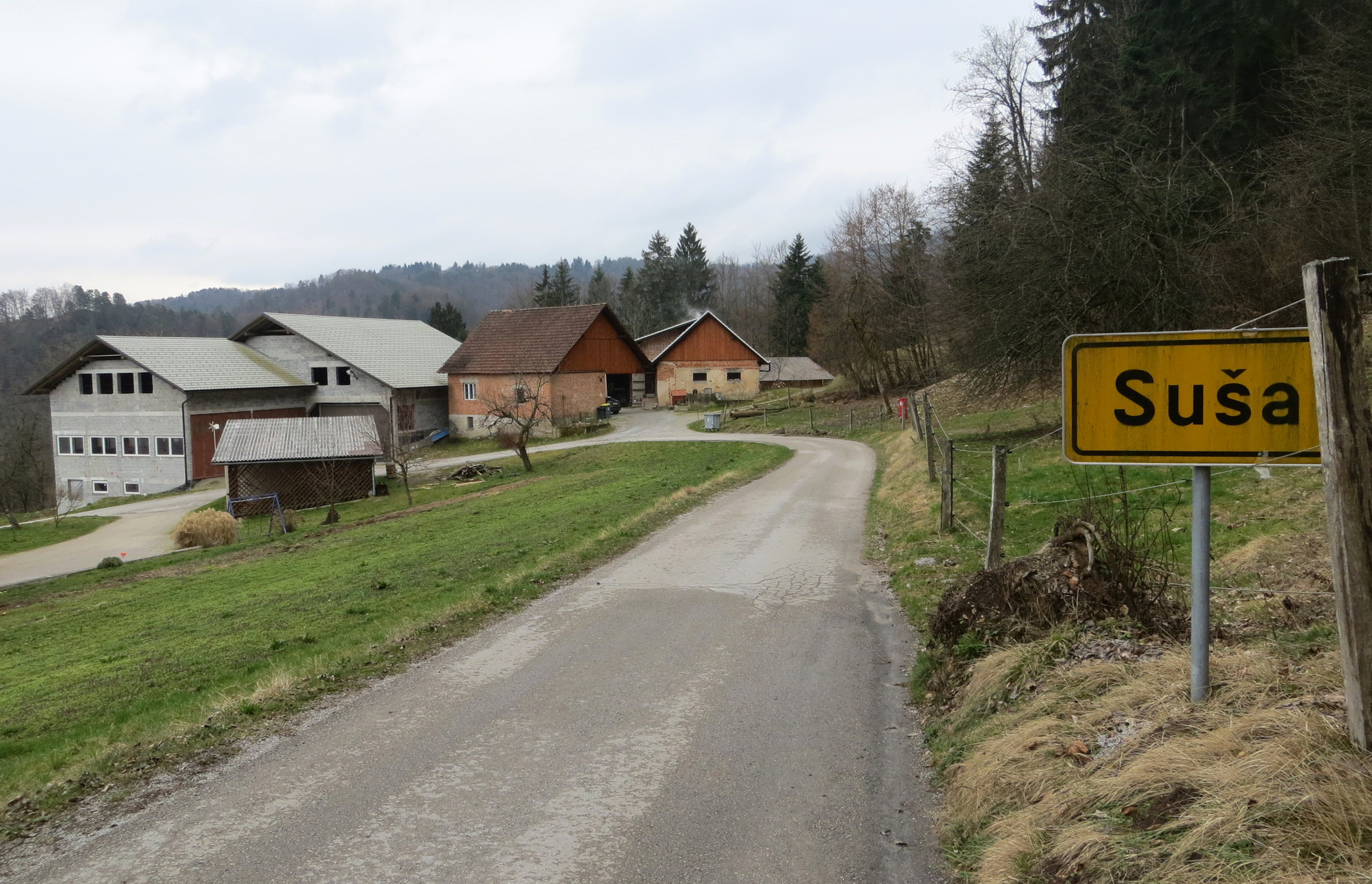

- Location in Slovenia
- Coordinates: 45°54′49.64″N 14°33′42.17″E
- Country: Slovenia
- Traditional region: Inner Carniola
- Statistical region: Central Slovenia
- Municipality: Ig

Area
  - Total: 1.0 km^{2} (0.39 sq mi)

Population (2024)
  - Total: 35
  - Density: 35/km^{2} (91/sq mi)

Suša (pronounced [ˈsuːʃa]) is a small village in the Municipality of Ig in southeastern Slovenia. The village is part of the traditional region of Inner Carniola and is included in the Central Slovenia Statistical Region.

== History ==
Suša was formally established as an independent settlement in 2007, when it was separated from the territory of Selnik. Prior to this it was a hamlet of Selnik.
