= Podkraj, Ig =

Podkraj
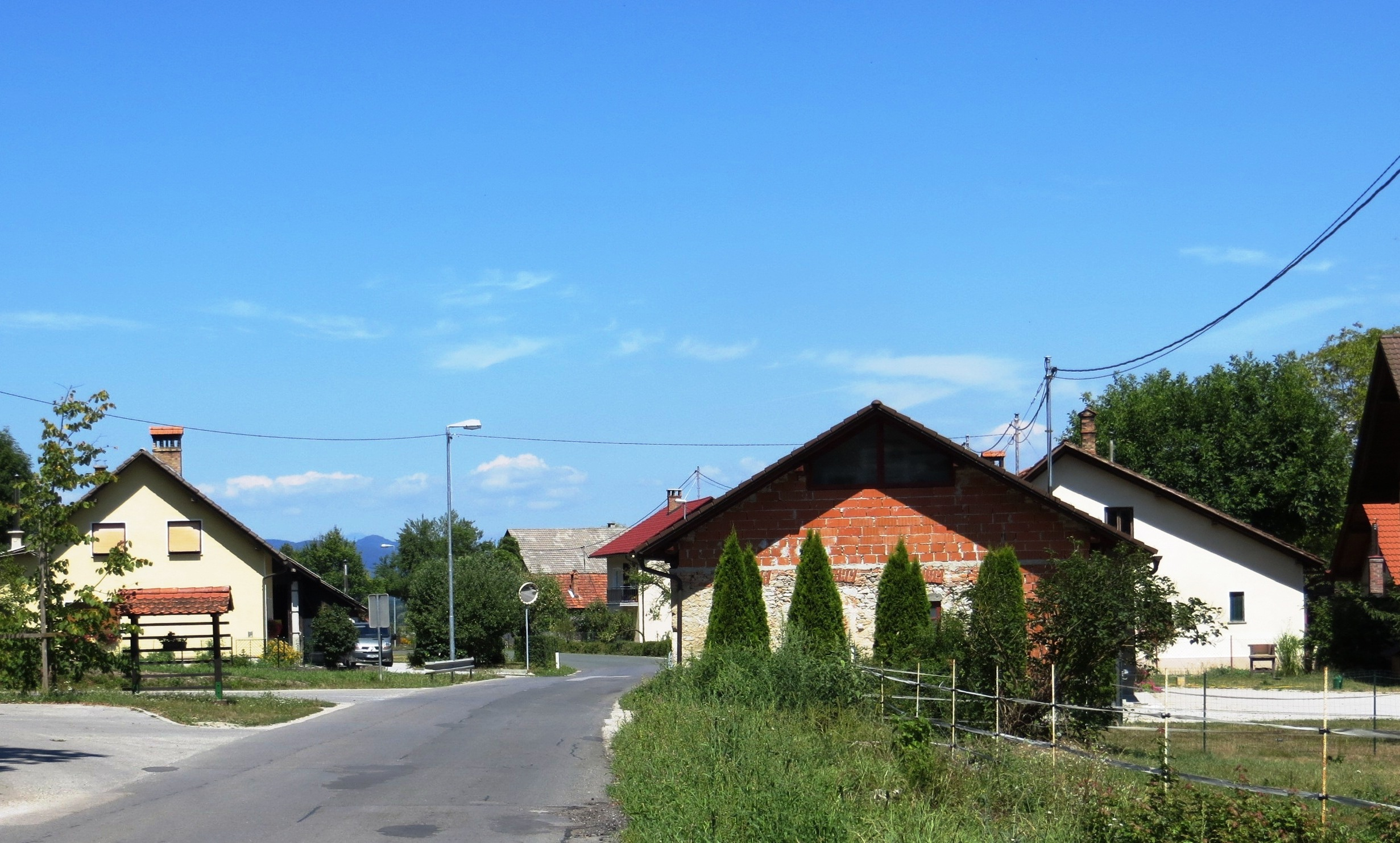

- Location in Slovenia
- Coordinates: 45°58′31.76″N 14°27′55.75″E
- Country: Slovenia
- Traditional region: Inner Carniola
- Statistical region: Central Slovenia
- Municipality: Ig

Area
  - Total: 2.5 km^{2} (0.97 sq mi)
- Elevation: 299 m (981 ft)

Population (2024)
  - Total: 157
- Postal code: 1292

Podkraj (pronounced [pɔtˈkɾai̯]) is a village in the Municipality of Ig in central Slovenia, on the edge of the marshland south of the capital Ljubljana. The municipality is part of the traditional region of Inner Carniola and is now included in the Central Slovenia Statistical Region. It includes the hamlet of Šent Janž (German: Sankt Johann).

== History ==
During the Second World War, Italian forces burned one house in Podkraj in October 1942. Podkraj was formally established as an independent settlement in 2007, when it was separated from the territory of Tomišelj. Prior to this it was a hamlet of Tomišelj.

== Church ==
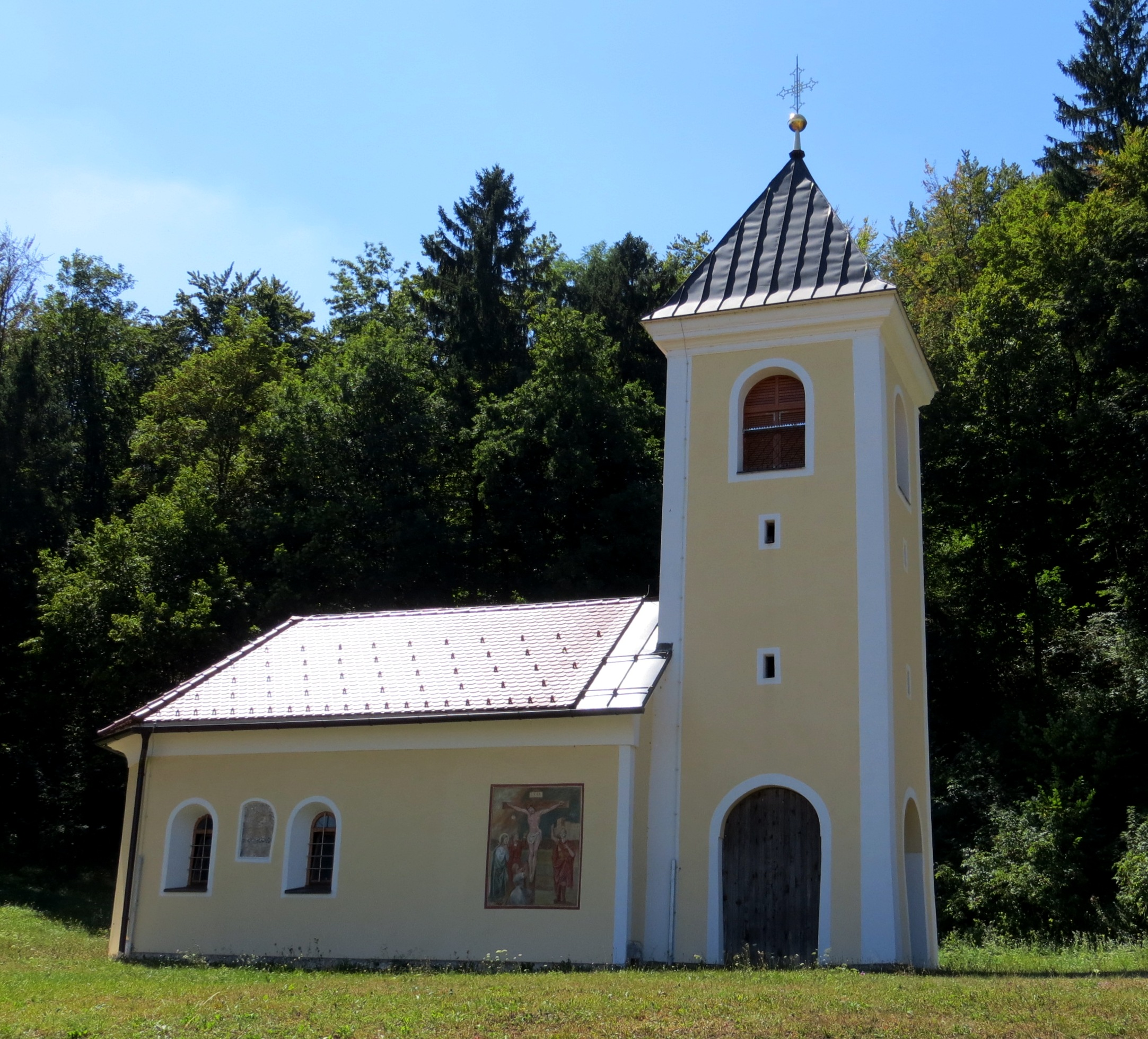
Saint John the Baptist Church

The local church is a chapel of ease dedicated to John the Baptist. It stands in the hamlet of Šent Janž and dates from the late Middle Ages and was remodeled in the Baroque style in the 17th century. The interior furnishings are Baroque.
