= Strahomer =

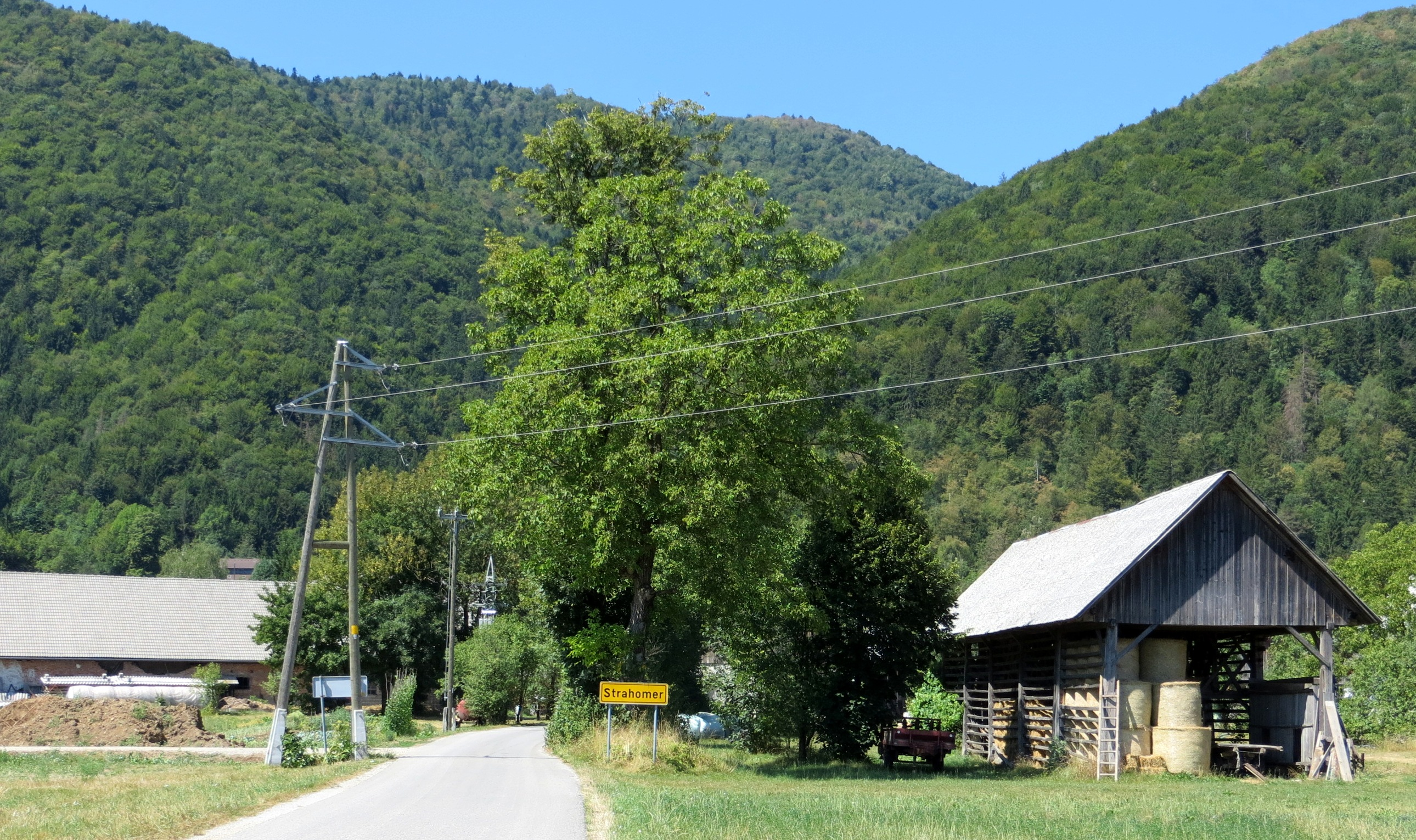

- Location in Slovenia
- Coordinates: 45°56′35.4″N 14°29′19.9″E
- Country: Slovenia
- Traditional region: Inner Carniola
- Statistical region: Central Slovenia
- Municipality: Ig

Area
  - Total: 6.4 km^{2} (2.5 sq mi)
- Elevation: 309.6 m (1,016 ft)

Population (2002)
  - Total: 143
- Postal code: 1292

Strahomer (pronounced [stɾaxɔˈmɛːɾ]) is a village in the Municipality of Ig in central Slovenia. The municipality is part of the traditional region of Inner Carniola and is now included in the Central Slovenia Statistical Region.

== Geography ==
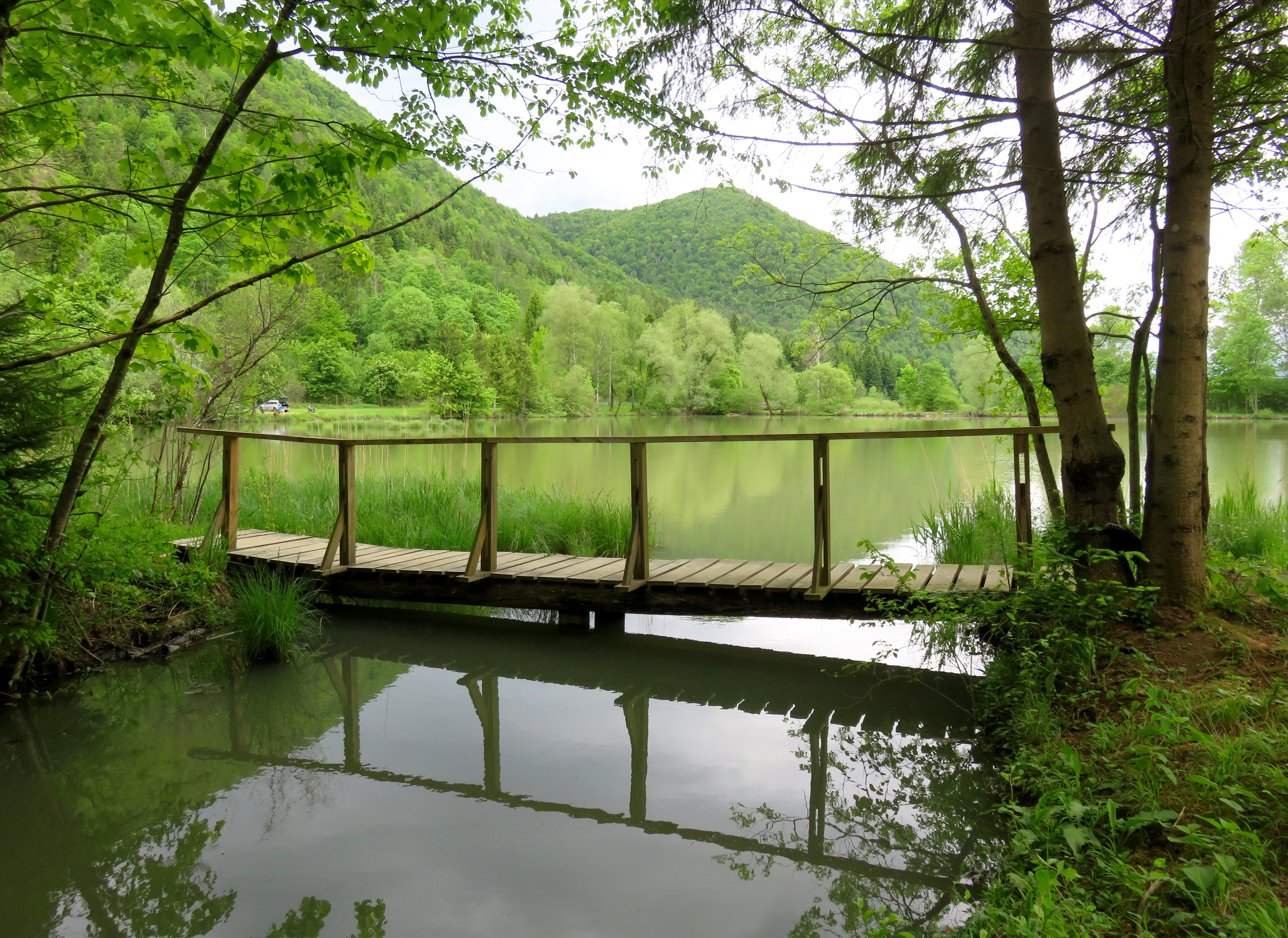
Strahomer Pond

Strahomer Pod (Slovene: Ribnik Strahomer, Bajer) lies 900 meters (3,000 ft) south of Strahomer. It was created in 1974, has an area of 2 hectares (4.9 acres), and is 1.5 meters (4 ft 11 in) deep. It has been used for catch-and-release fishing since 2017.

== Name ==
Strahomer was attested in historical sources as Strachamer in 1415, Dachanier in 1436, and Drachomer in 1445, among other spellings. The name Strahomer is derived from the Slavic personal name *Straxoměrъ, probably referring to an early inhabitant of the place.

== History ==
Strahomer was already inhabited in prehistoric times by pile dwellers. Many Roman artifacts have also been found in the area.

== Church ==
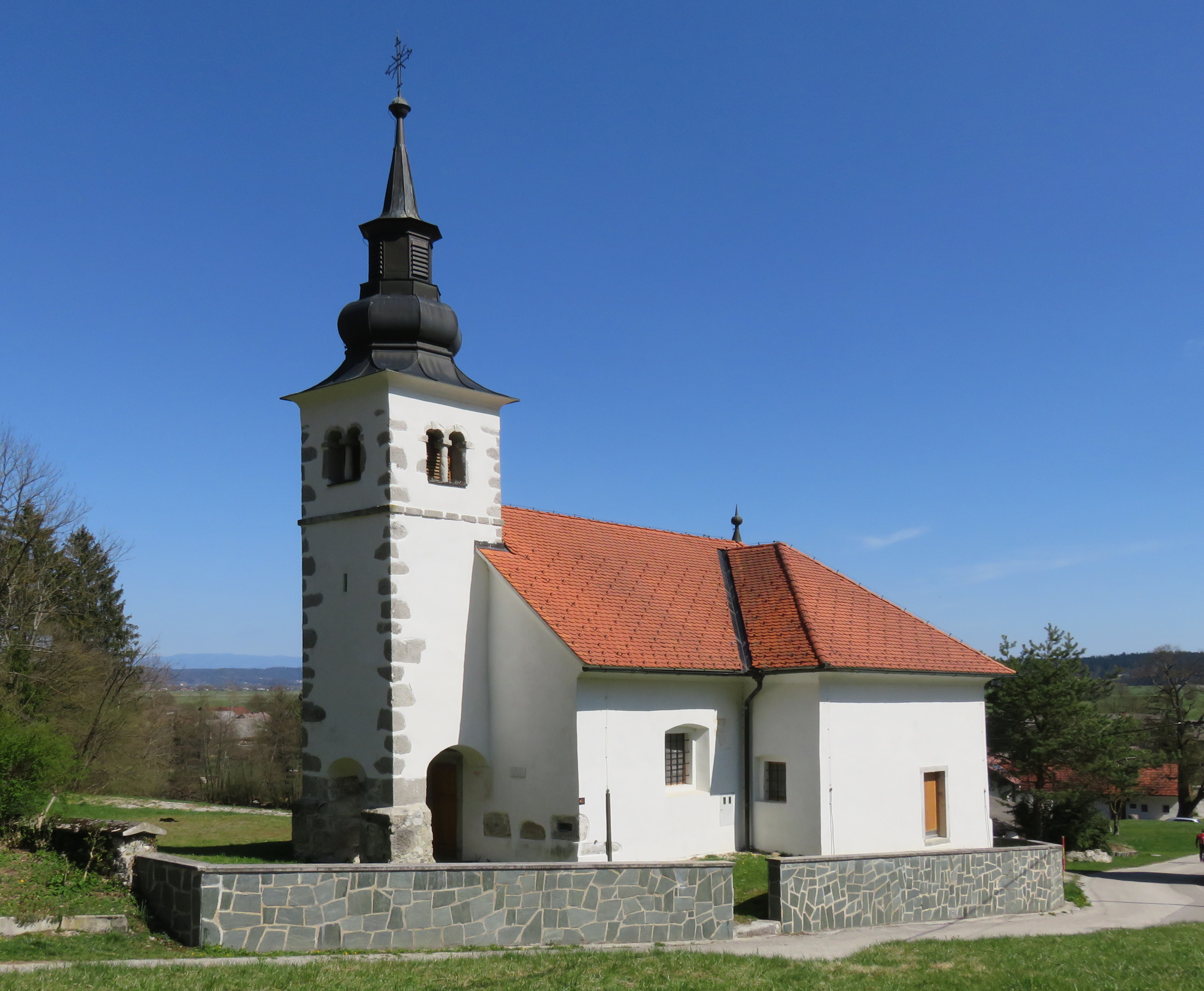
Saint James's Church

The local church is dedicated to Saint James (Slovene: sveti Jakob) and belongs to the Parish of Tomišelj. It was first mentioned in written documents dating to 1495 but was extensively rebuilt in the 17th century. Some original frescos from the late 15th century survive on the interior walls.
