= Vrh pri Fari =

- Location in Slovenia
- Coordinates: 45°29′22.81″N 14°54′4.36″E
- Country: Slovenia
- Traditional region: Lower Carniola
- Statistical region: Southeast Slovenia
- Municipality: Kostel

Area
  - Total: 0.34 km^{2} (0.13 sq mi)
- Elevation: 414 m (1,358 ft)

Population (2002)
  - Total: 22
- Postal code: 1336

Vrh pri Fari (pronounced [ˈʋəɾx pɾi ˈfaːɾi]; German: Werch) is a small village in the hills above the left bank of the Kolpa River in the Kostel in southern Slovenia. The area is part of the traditional region of Lower Carniola and is now included in the Southeast Slovenia Statistical Region.

== Name ==
The name of the settlement was changed from Vrh to Vrh pri Fari in 1953. In the past the German name was Werch.

== Church ==
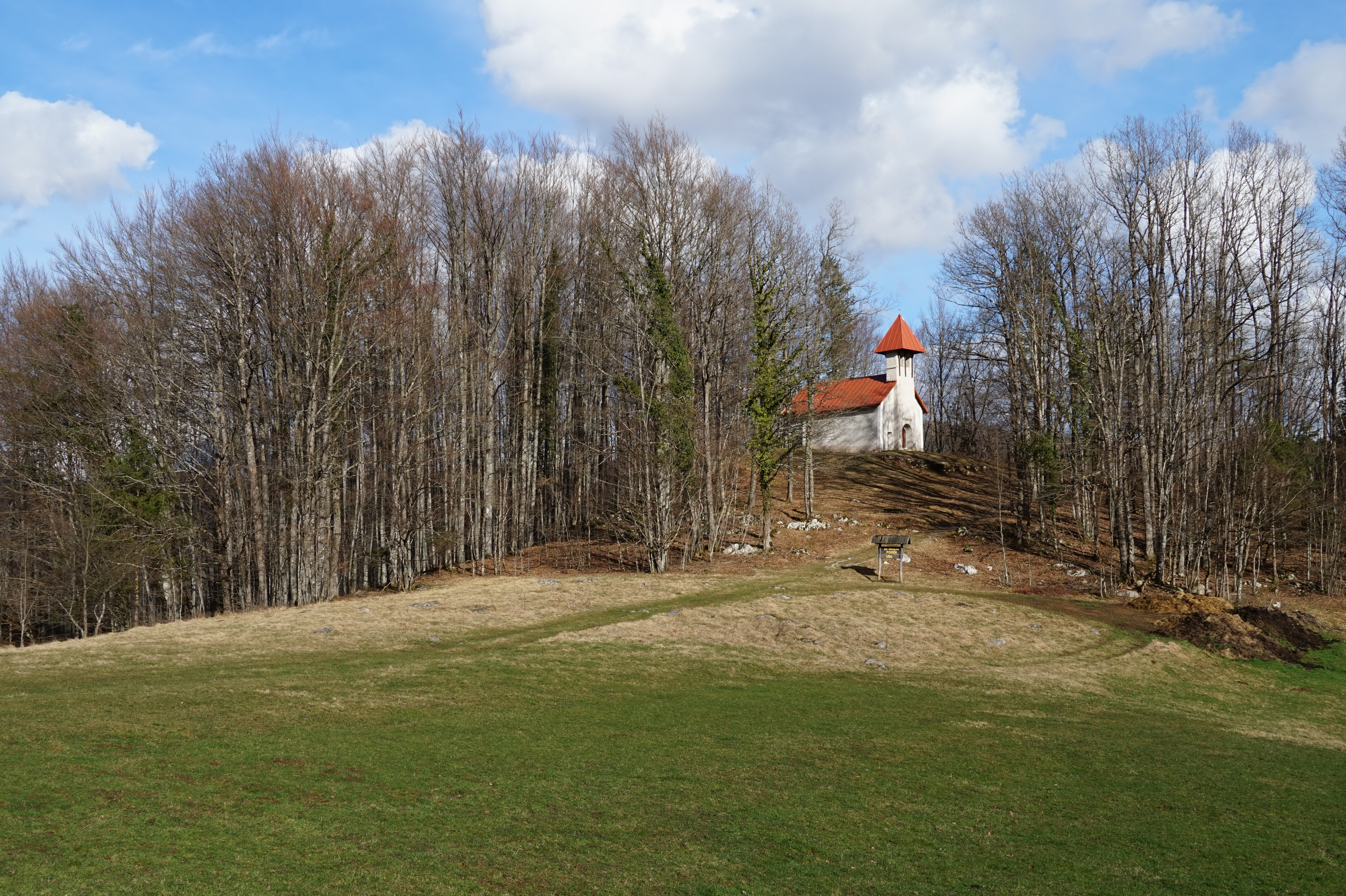
Saint Nicholas's Church

The local church, built on a promontory overlooking the Kolpa Valley northeast of the settlement, is dedicated to Saint Nicholas (Slovene: sveti Miklavž, also known locally as sveti Mikula) and belongs to the Parish of Fara pri Kočevju. It dates to the 18th century.

== Notable people ==
- Minca Krkovič (1858–1933), Slovenian field laborer and folk singer; born in Vrh pri Fari
