= Kot, Ig =

Kot
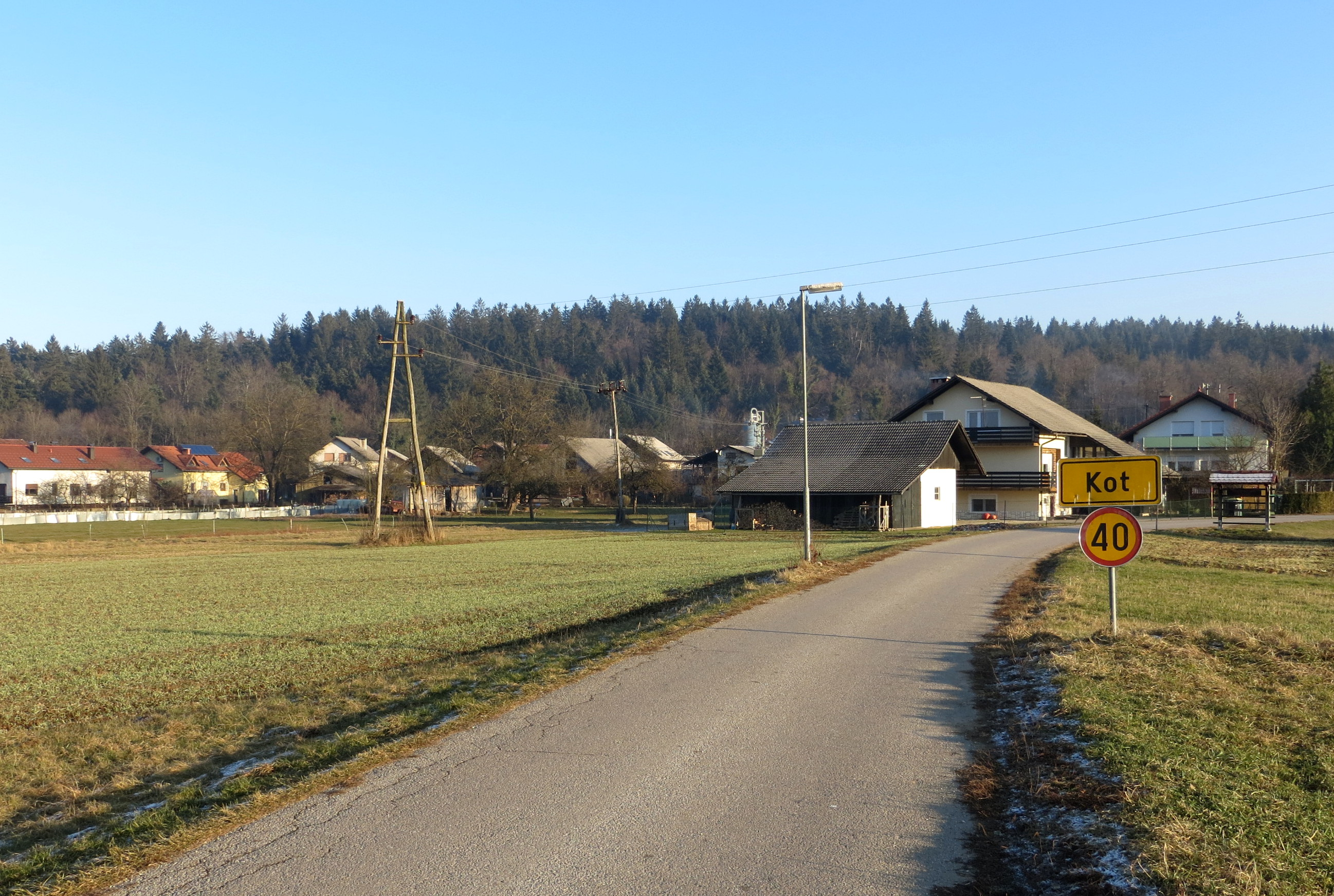

- Location in Slovenia
- Coordinates: 45°56′35.89″N 14°31′13.52″E
- Country: Slovenia
- Traditional region: Inner Carniola
- Statistical region: Central Slovenia
- Municipality: Ig

Area
  - Total: 1.49 km^{2} (0.58 sq mi)
- Elevation: 382.4 m (1,255 ft)

Population (2002)
  - Total: 106
- Postal code: 1292

Kot (pronounced [ˈkoːt]; German: Winkel) is a village in the Municipality of Ig in central Slovenia, just south of the capital Ljubljana. The municipality is part of the traditional region of Inner Carniola and is now included in the Central Slovenia Statistical Region.

== Name ==
Kot was attested in historical sources as Binkhell in 1463 (and as Winkell in 1467 and Winckell in 1484). The name Kot is shared by several villages in Slovenia. It comes from the common noun kot 'closed valley, combe', referring to the place where a valley ends, closed in by mountains or hills. The village was known as Winkel in modern German, which has the same meaning.
