= Matena =

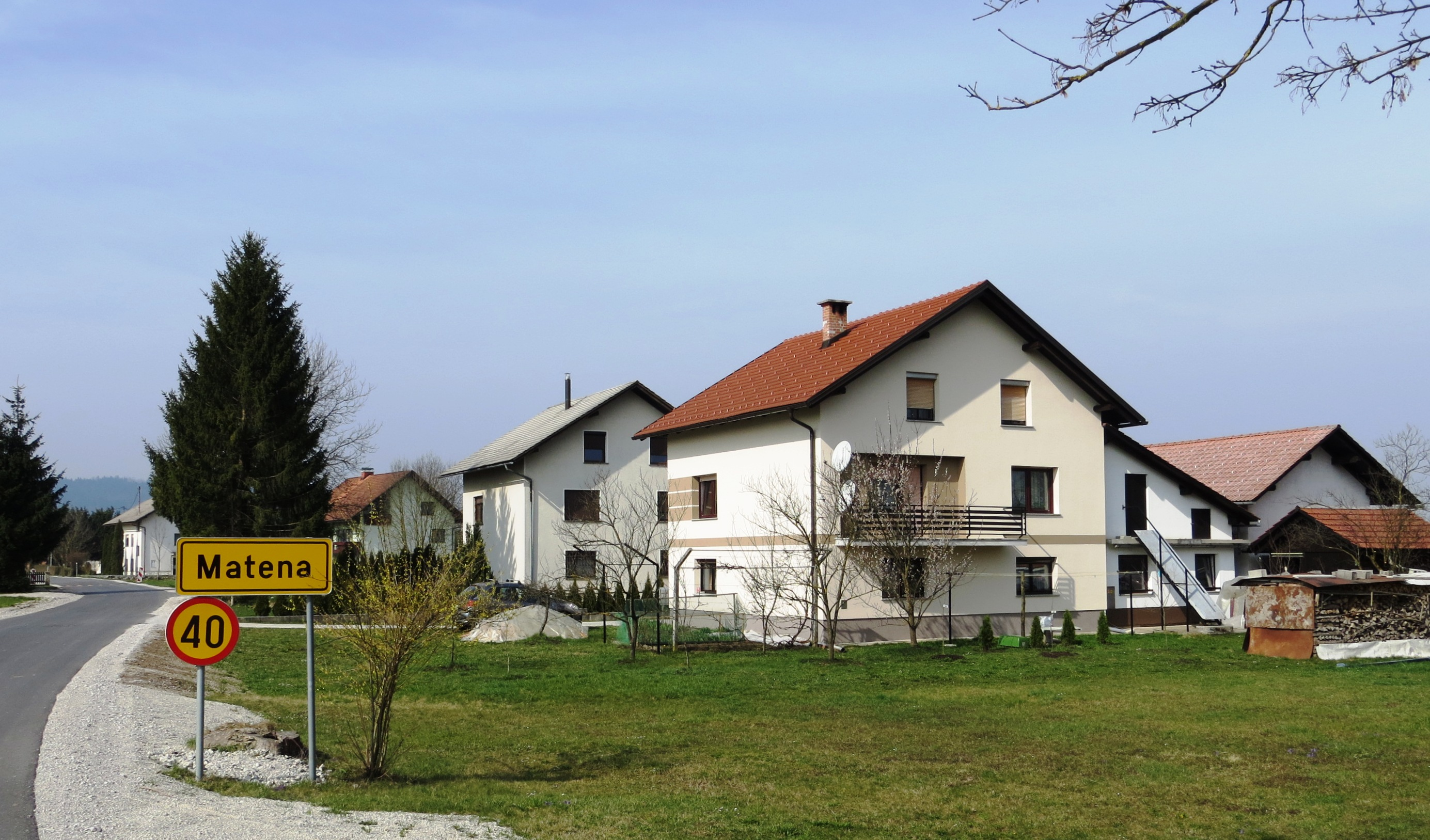

- Location in Slovenia
- Coordinates: 45°59′41.71″N 14°30′47.43″E
- Country: Slovenia
- Traditional region: Inner Carniola
- Statistical region: Central Slovenia
- Municipality: Ig

Area
  - Total: 3.4 km^{2} (1.3 sq mi)
- Elevation: 285.7 m (937 ft)

Population (2002)
  - Total: 252
- Postal code: 1292

Matena (pronounced [maˈteːna]) is a village in the Municipality of Ig in central Slovenia, just south of the capital Ljubljana. The entire municipality is part of the traditional region of Inner Carniola and is now included in the Central Slovenia Statistical Region.

== Name ==
Matena was attested in written sources in 1421 or 1422 as Mathesdorff and Mattestorff. The Slovene name is probably a contraction of *Matejina (vas), derived from the Biblical name Matej 'Matthew', thus meaning 'Matthew's village'. The medieval attestations have the genitive form of the name in Middle High German as their first element.

== Church ==
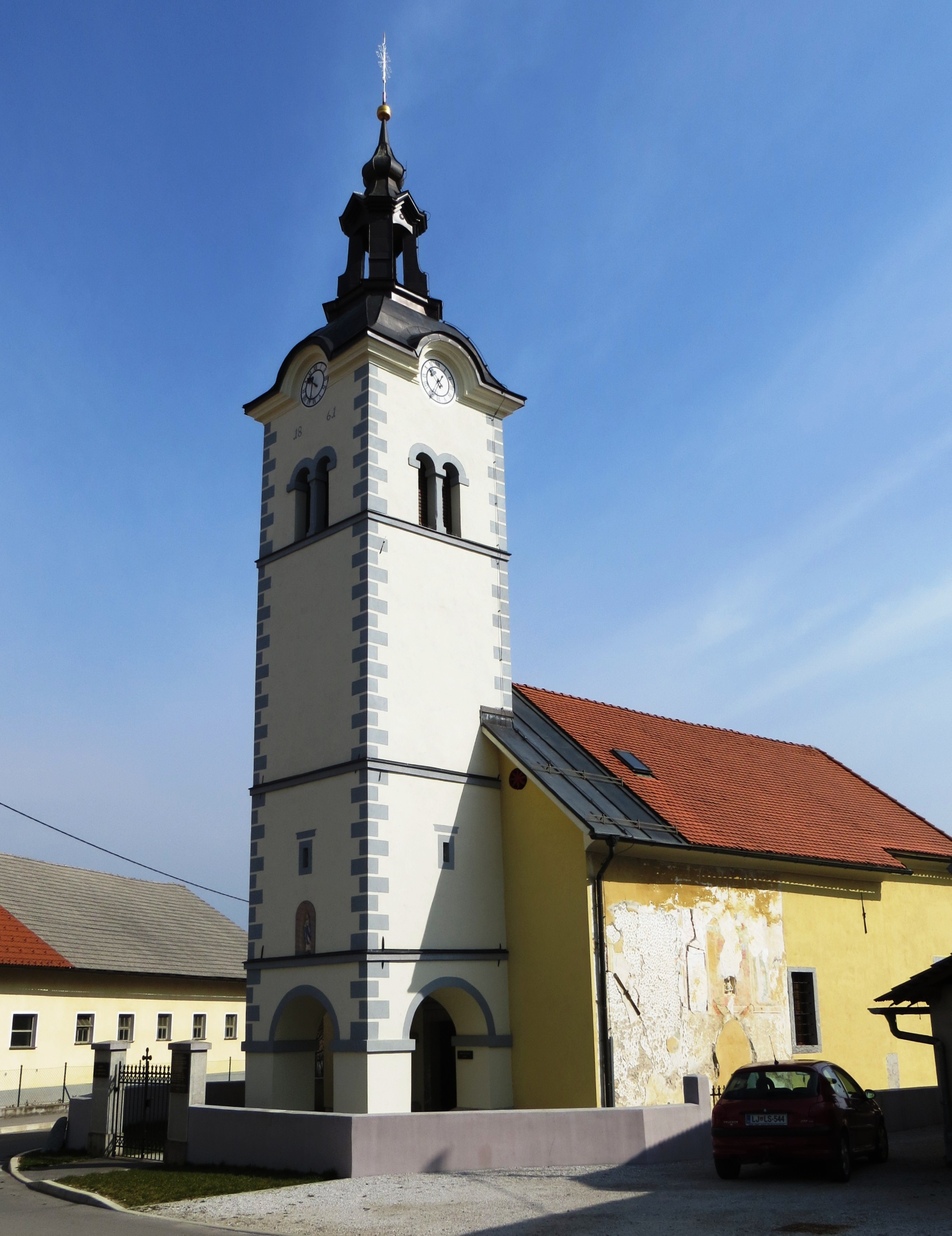
Saints Hermagoras and Fortunatus Church

The local church is dedicated to Saints Hermagoras and Fortunatus and belongs to the Parish of Ig. It is a Gothic building that was restyled in the Baroque in the late 17th century.

== Cultural heritage ==
In addition to Saints Hermagoras and Fortunatus Church, several other structures in Matena are registered as cultural heritage:

- The village core itself is registered as cultural heritage because of its special ambiance. Matena is a ribbon village with a preserved series of buildings from the second half of the 19th century. The center of the village is at a fork in the road in front of the church and the village linden tree.
- The Lanišče archaeological site has yielded finds from prehistoric, Roman, and Medieval times, including pottery, horseshoes, and a Venetian coin. Secondary sites associated with the site include Roman-era gravestones at the church and the site of the 16th-century Höfflein Manor, which was destroyed in the 1895 earthquake.
- The Stari Deli archaeological site has yielded Roman-era horseshoes and two oak dugout canoes. One of them was identified as associated with prehistoric pile dwellings. It was discovered while cleaning a ditch in 1927 and taken to the National Museum of Slovenia. The other, discovered in 1948, was destroyed.
- The village features 13 straight-line hayracks dating from the 19th century along a farm road south of the village center. The oldest hayracks are made of wood with tile roofs, and others have been renovated with concrete columns and asbestos-cement roof panels.
- The house at Matena no. 26 stands at a fork in the road in the northern part of the village. It is a single-story rectangular structure with a dormer above the entrance and a gabled roof. It has a rectangular door casing bearing the year 1914 and a richly ornamented facade from the sane time.
- The house at Matena no. 28 stands east of the village core. It is a single-story structure with a large dormer and entrance in the side facing the road. It has a half-hip roof covered in clay tiles. The facade is decorated in Secession style and dates from the beginning of the 20th century.
- There is a granary at Matena no. 32, in the center of the village next to the square in front of the village linden tree and church. It is a small, two-story structure dating from the beginning of the 19th century. It has a gabled roof with extended eaves above wooden steps and a balcony on the upper floor, where the entrance to the granary is. The ground floor was built as a residential area.
- There is a chapel shrine south of the village, along a field road to Iška Loka. It contains a statue of the Virgin Mary and has painted side niches, and was created in 1925.
- A stone column shrine stands at the crossroads in the village. It is topped by a hip roof with a cross, below which there is a seated figure of Christ in a wooden enclosure. The shrine dates from the 19th century.
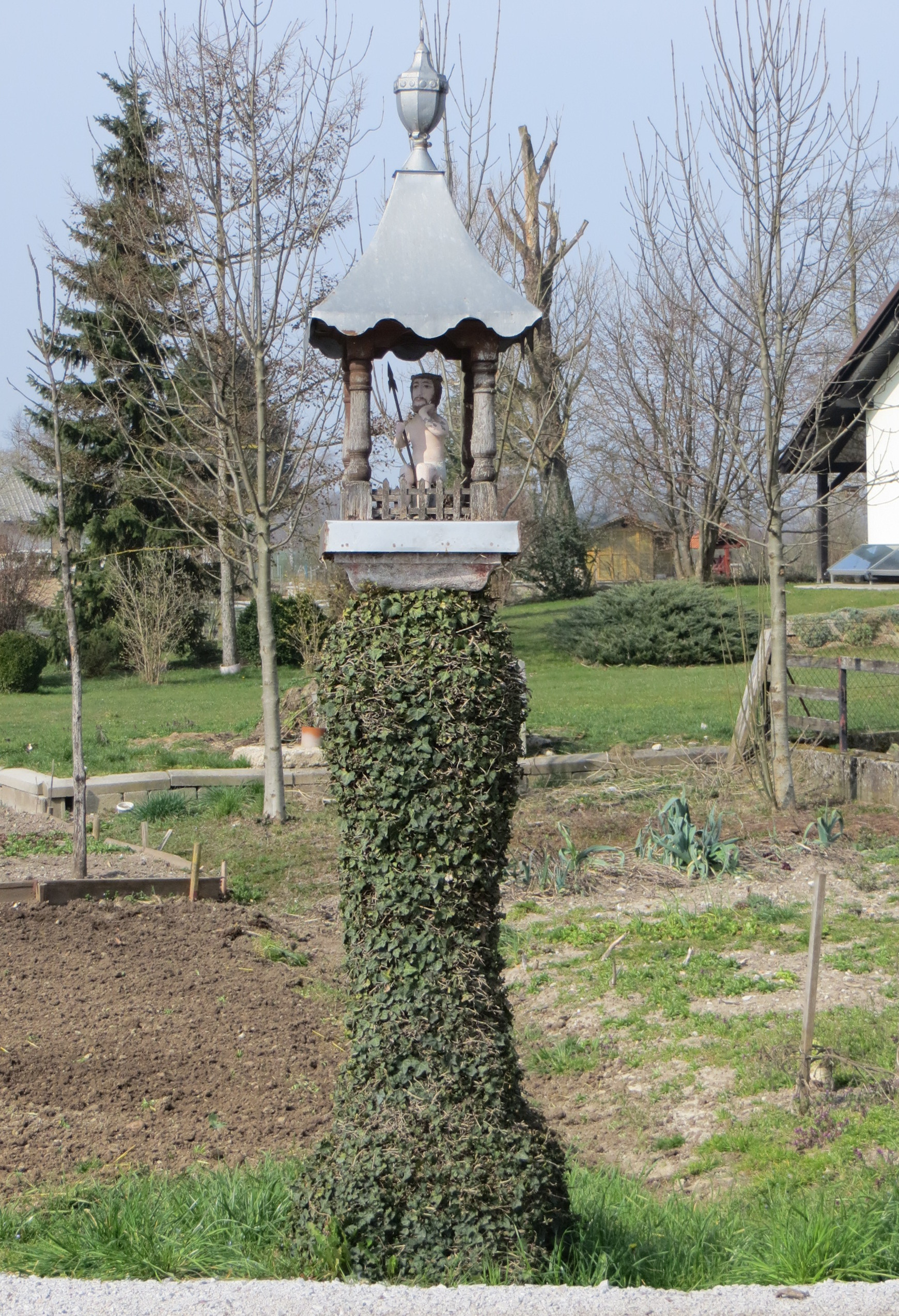
Column shrine

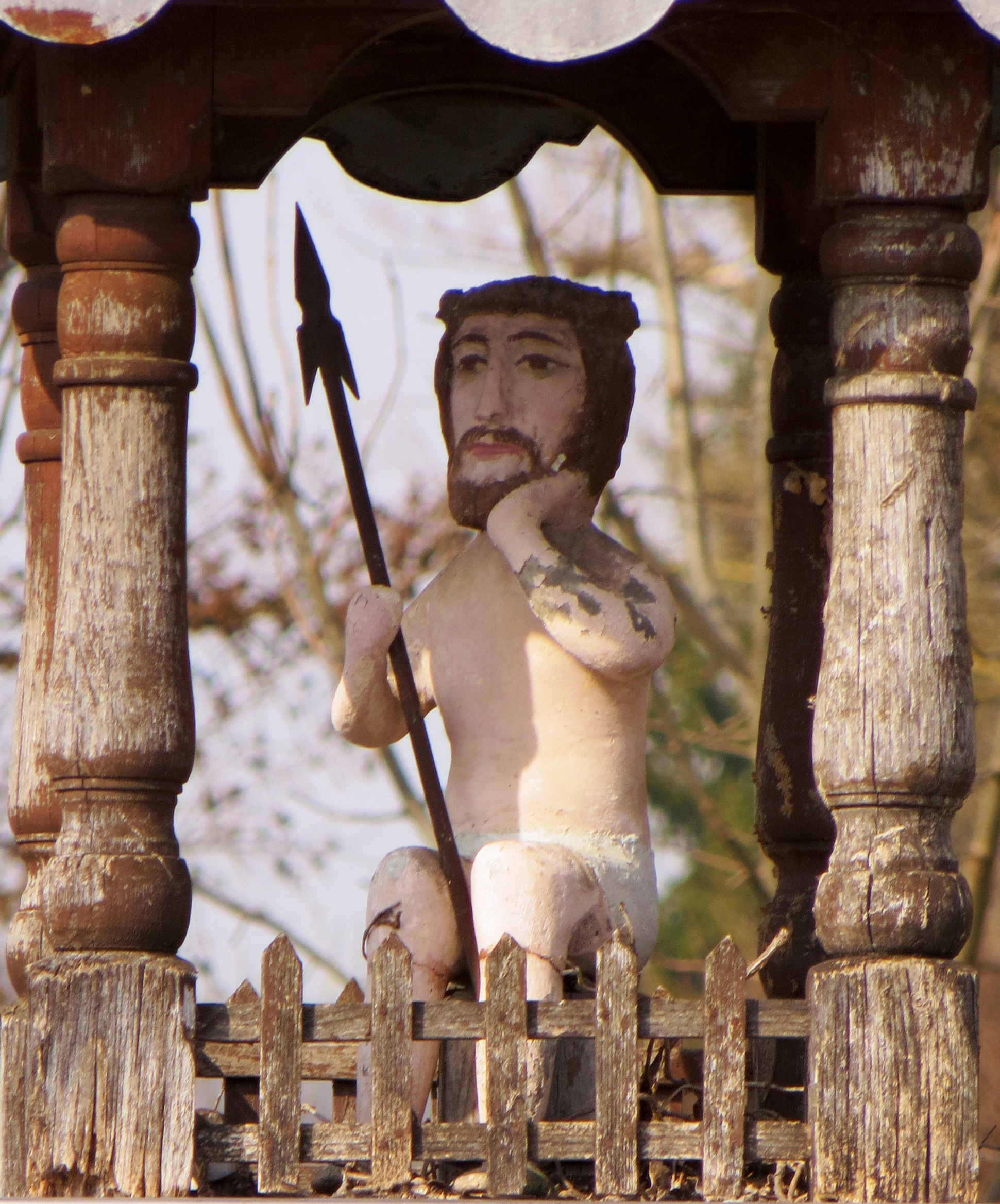
Shrine detail
