= Hrib pri Fari =

- Location in Slovenia
- Coordinates: 45°28′38.35″N 14°52′40.63″E
- Country: Slovenia
- Traditional region: Lower Carniola
- Statistical region: Southeast Slovenia
- Municipality: Kostel

Area
  - Total: 0.29 km^{2} (0.11 sq mi)
- Elevation: 265.9 m (872 ft)

Population (2002)
  - Total: 8
- Postal code: 1336

Hrib pri Fari (pronounced [ˈxɾiːp pɾi ˈfaːɾi]) is a small settlement immediately west of Fara in the Municipality of Kostel in southern Slovenia. The area is part of the traditional region of Lower Carniola and is now included in the Southeast Slovenia Statistical Region.

== Name ==
The name of the settlement was changed from Hrib to Hrib pri Fari in 1953.

== Notable people ==
- Minca Krkovič (1858–1933), Slovenian field laborer and folk singer; died in Hrib pri Fari
