= Municipality of Ig =

Municipality of Slovenia

Municipality of Ig Občina Ig
- Municipality
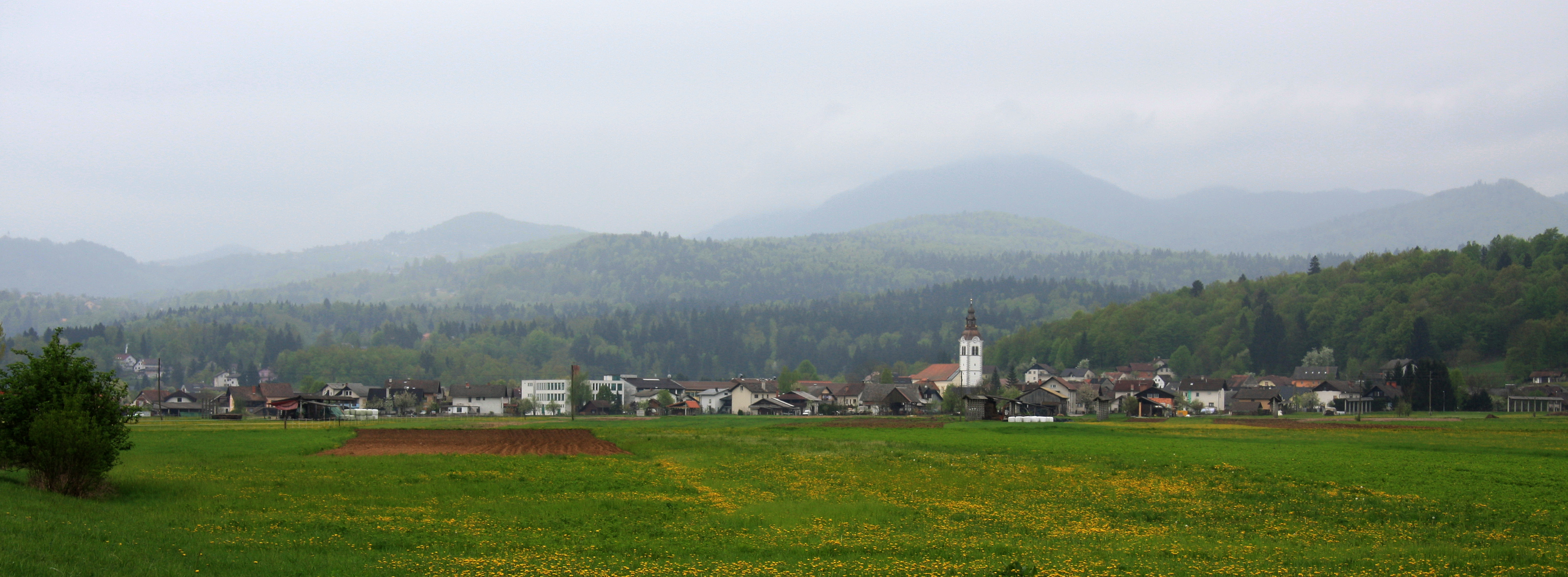

- Location of the Municipality of Ig in Slovenia
- Coordinates: 45°58′N 14°32′E
- Country: Slovenia

Government
  - Mayor: Janez Cimperman (Independent)

Area
  - Total: 98.8 km^{2} (38.1 sq mi)

Population (2002)
  - Total: 5,445
  - Density: 55.1/km^{2} (143/sq mi)
- Time zone: UTC+01 (CET)
  - Summer (DST): UTC+02 (CEST)
- Website: www.obcina-ig.si

The Municipality of Ig (pronounced [ˈiːk]; Slovene: Občina Ig) is a municipality in central Slovenia. Its seat is the settlement of Ig. It was formed in 1995 from parts of the Municipality of Vič–Rudnik, until then one of the five municipalities that formed the Civic Assembly of Municipalities of Ljubljana. It is part of the traditional region of Inner Carniola and is now included in the Central Slovenia Statistical Region. In the past the area was mostly marshland, but now Ig is a suburban and industrialized municipality. In 2002, it had 5,445 inhabitants.

== Settlements ==
In addition to the municipal seat of Ig, the municipality also includes the following settlements:

- Brest
- Dobravica
- Draga
- Golo
- Gornji Ig
- Iška
- Iška Loka
- Iška Vas
- Kot
- Kremenica
- Matena
- Podgozd
- Podkraj
- Rogatec nad Želimljami
- Sarsko
- Selnik
- Škrilje
- Staje
- Strahomer
- Suša
- Tomišelj
- Visoko
- Vrbljene
- Zapotok
