= Rogatec nad Želimljami =

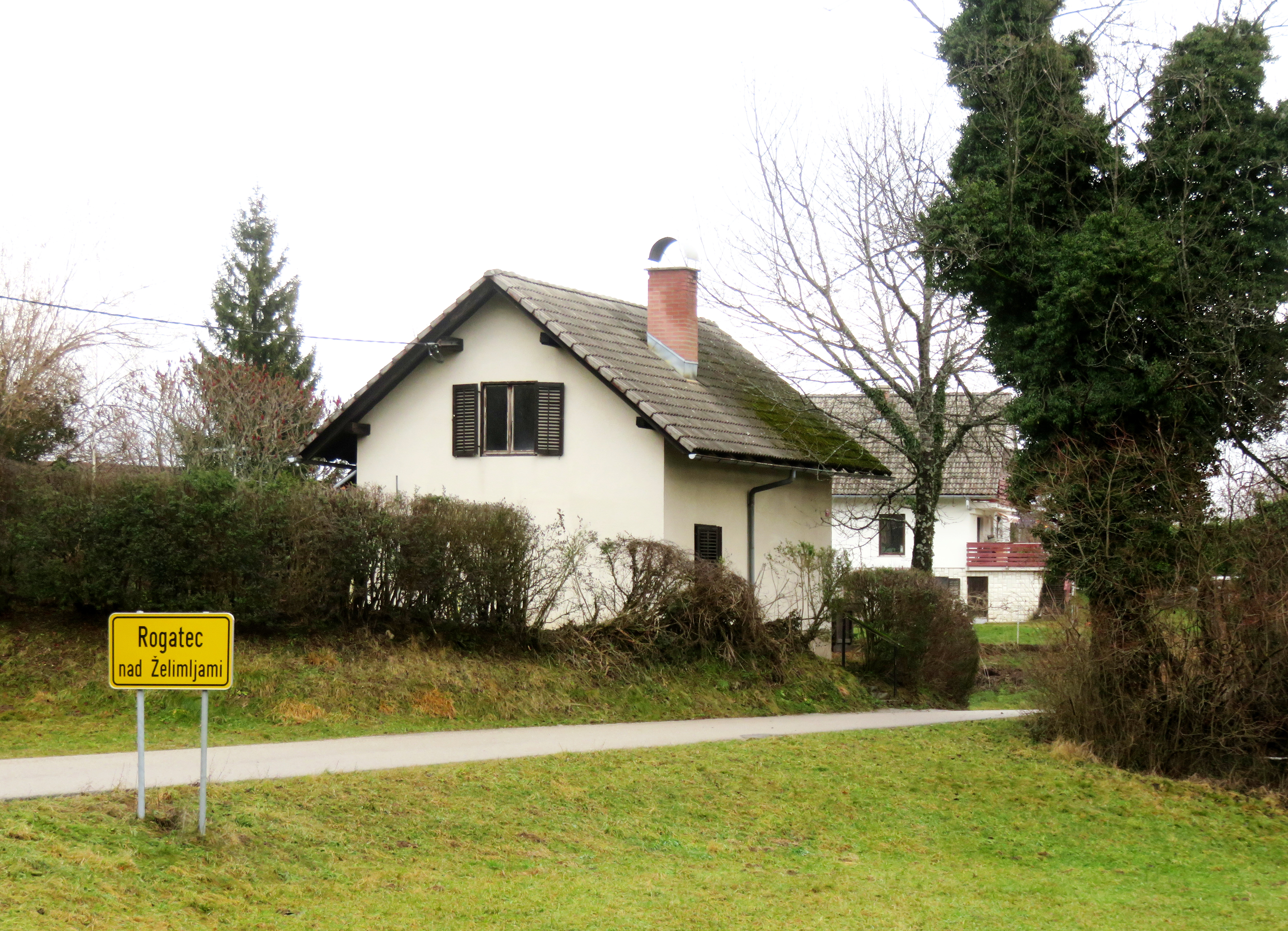

- Location in Slovenia
- Coordinates: 45°54′0.45″N 14°34′8.04″E
- Country: Slovenia
- Traditional region: Inner Carniola
- Statistical region: Central Slovenia
- Municipality: Ig

Area
  - Total: 0.87 km^{2} (0.34 sq mi)
- Elevation: 614.3 m (2,015 ft)

Population (2002)
  - Total: 17
- Postal code: 1292

Rogatec nad Želimljami (pronounced [ɾɔˈɡaːtəts nat ʒɛˈliːmljami], in older sources Hudi Rogatec) is a small settlement in the hills southeast of Golo in the Municipality of Ig in central Slovenia. The entire municipality is part of the traditional region of Inner Carniola and is now included in the Central Slovenia Statistical Region.

== Name ==
The name of the settlement was changed from Rogatec to Rogatec nad Želimljami in 1955.
