= Škrilje, Ig =

Škrilje
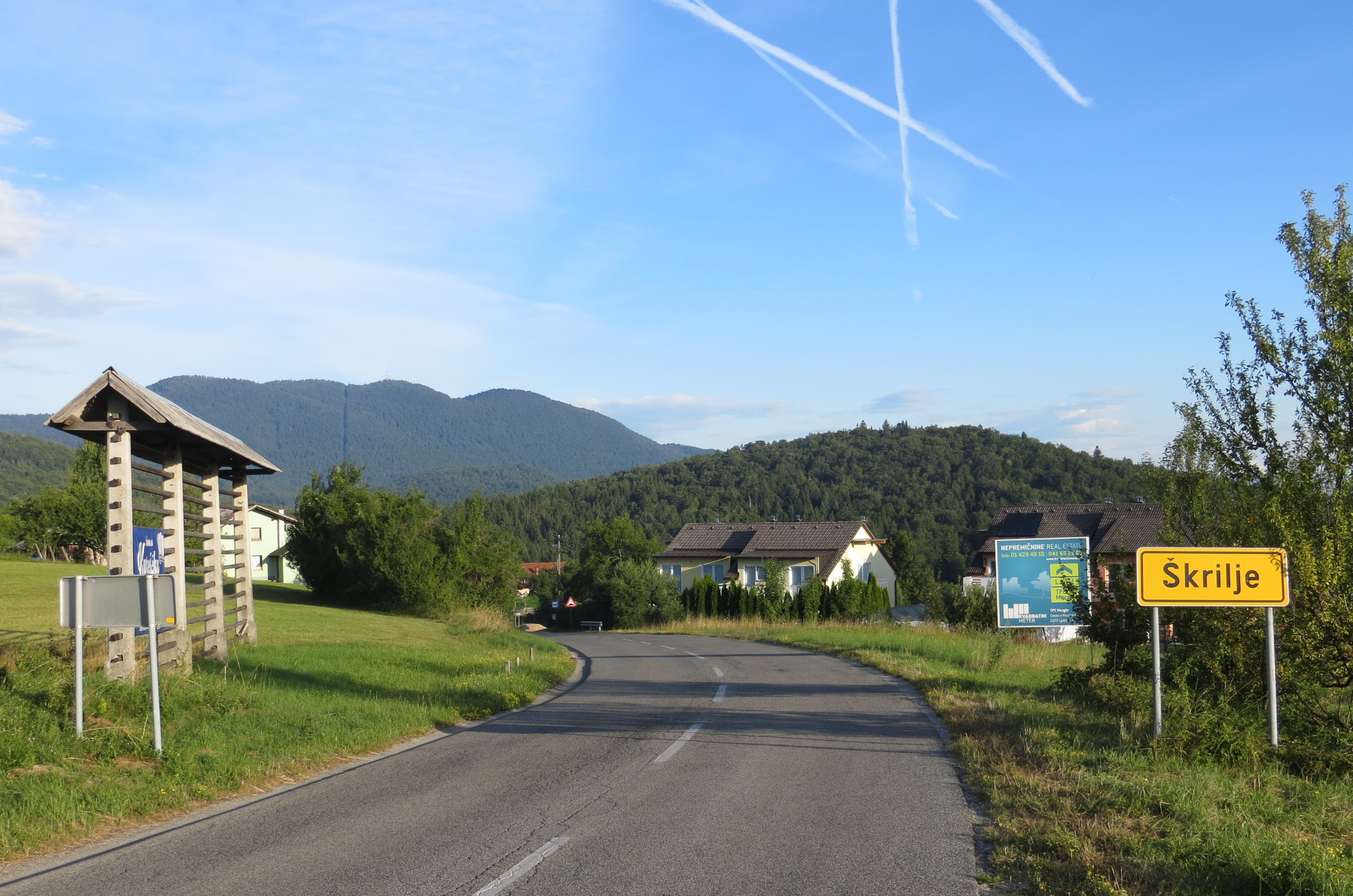

- Location in Slovenia
- Coordinates: 45°55′2.25″N 14°32′27.32″E
- Country: Slovenia
- Traditional region: Inner Carniola
- Statistical region: Central Slovenia
- Municipality: Ig

Area
  - Total: 3.55 km^{2} (1.37 sq mi)
- Elevation: 581.3 m (1,907 ft)

Population (2002)
  - Total: 304
- Postal code: 1292

Škrilje (pronounced [ˈʃkɾiːljɛ]) is a village in the Municipality of Ig in central Slovenia. The municipality is part of the traditional region of Inner Carniola and is now included in the Central Slovenia Statistical Region.

The site of an Iron Age fortified settlement has been found on Stražar Hill west of the settlement on a strategic point above the Iška Gorge.
