= Staje =

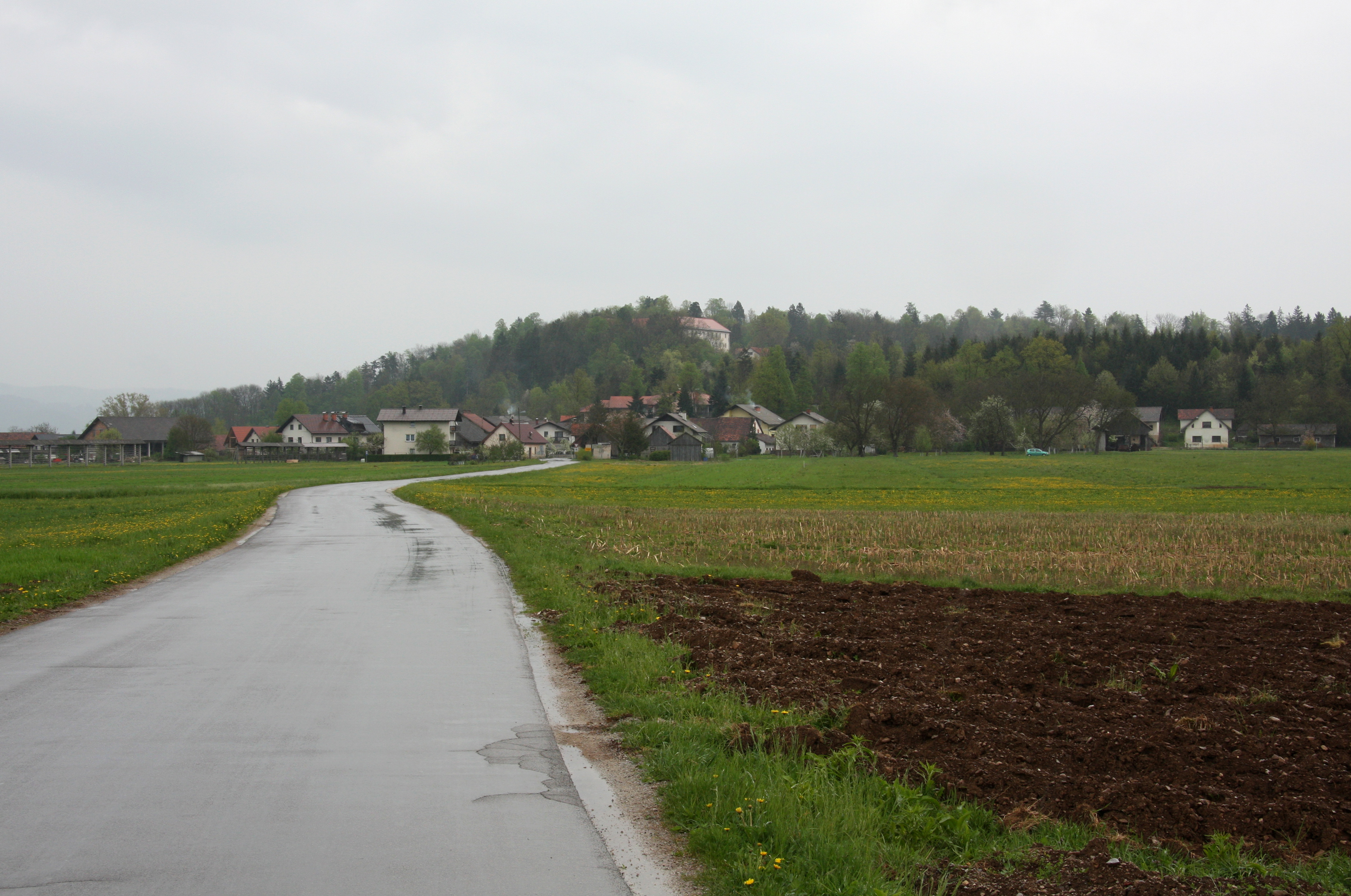

- Location in Slovenia
- Coordinates: 45°57′28.28″N 14°30′30.08″E
- Country: Slovenia
- Traditional region: Inner Carniola
- Statistical region: Central Slovenia
- Municipality: Ig

Area
  - Total: 1.45 km^{2} (0.56 sq mi)
- Elevation: 307.5 m (1,009 ft)

Population (2002)
  - Total: 118
- Postal code: 1292

Staje (pronounced [ˈstaːjɛ]; German: Staidorf) is a settlement west of Ig in central Slovenia. The entire Municipality of Ig is part of the traditional region of Inner Carniola and is now included in the Central Slovenia Statistical Region.
