= Sarsko =

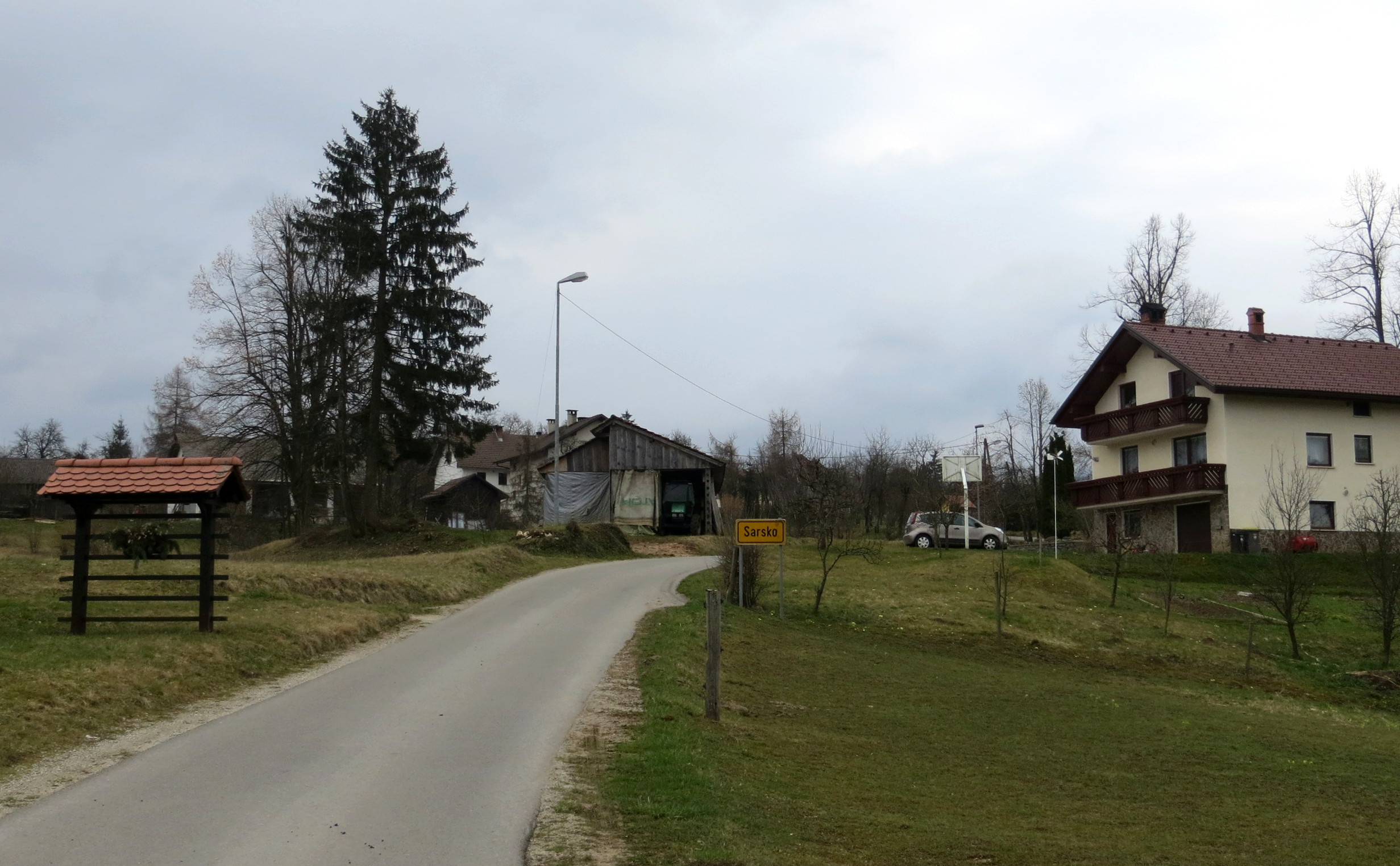

- Location in Slovenia
- Coordinates: 45°56′8.25″N 14°33′28.99″E
- Country: Slovenia
- Traditional region: Inner Carniola
- Statistical region: Central Slovenia
- Municipality: Ig

Area
  - Total: 1.62 km^{2} (0.63 sq mi)
- Elevation: 433.4 m (1,422 ft)

Population (2002)
  - Total: 46
- Postal code: 1292

Sarsko (pronounced [ˈsaːɾskɔ]) is a small village southeast of Ig in central Slovenia. The Municipality of Ig is part of the traditional region of Inner Carniola and is now included in the Central Slovenia Statistical Region.

== Church ==
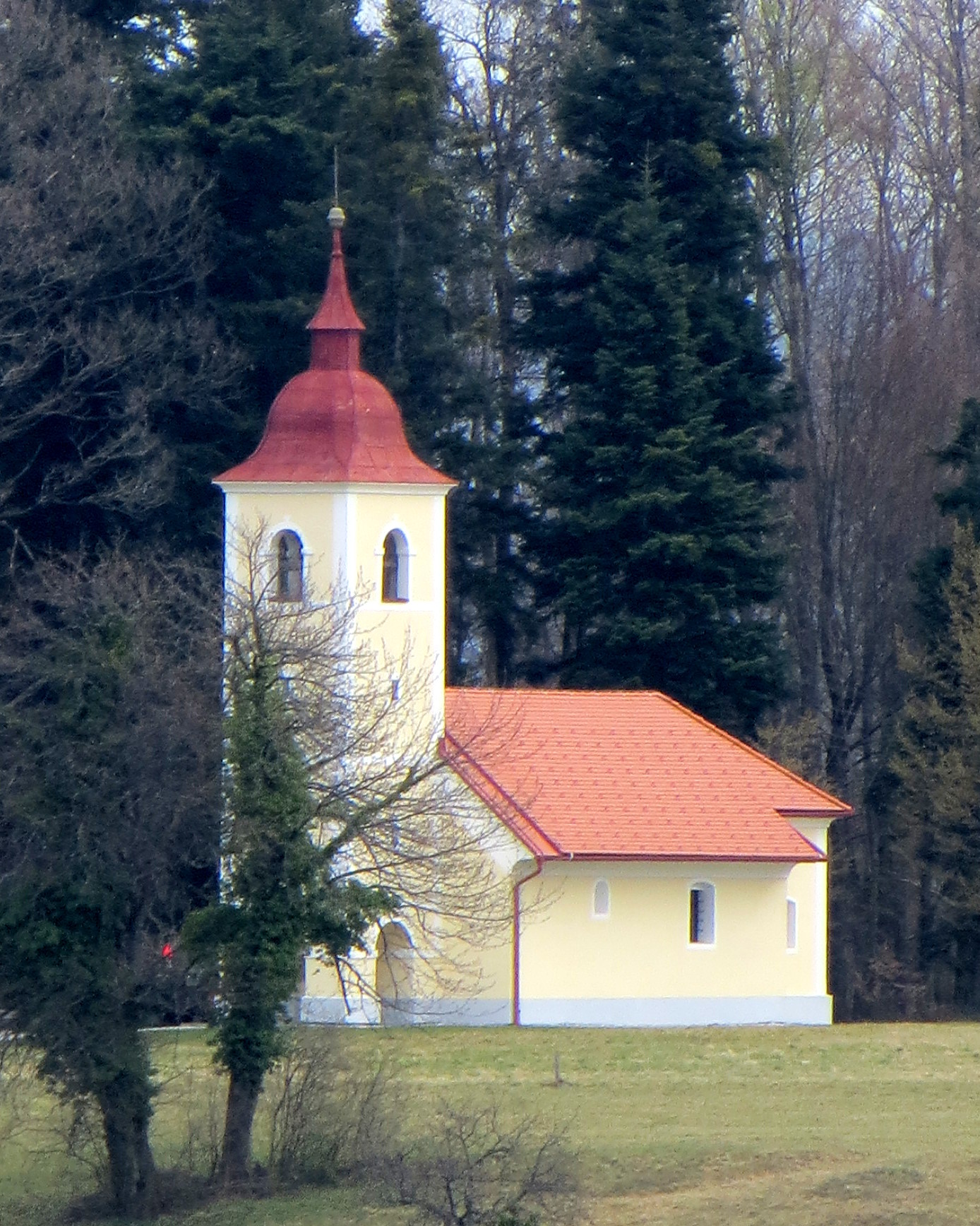
Saint Rupert's Church

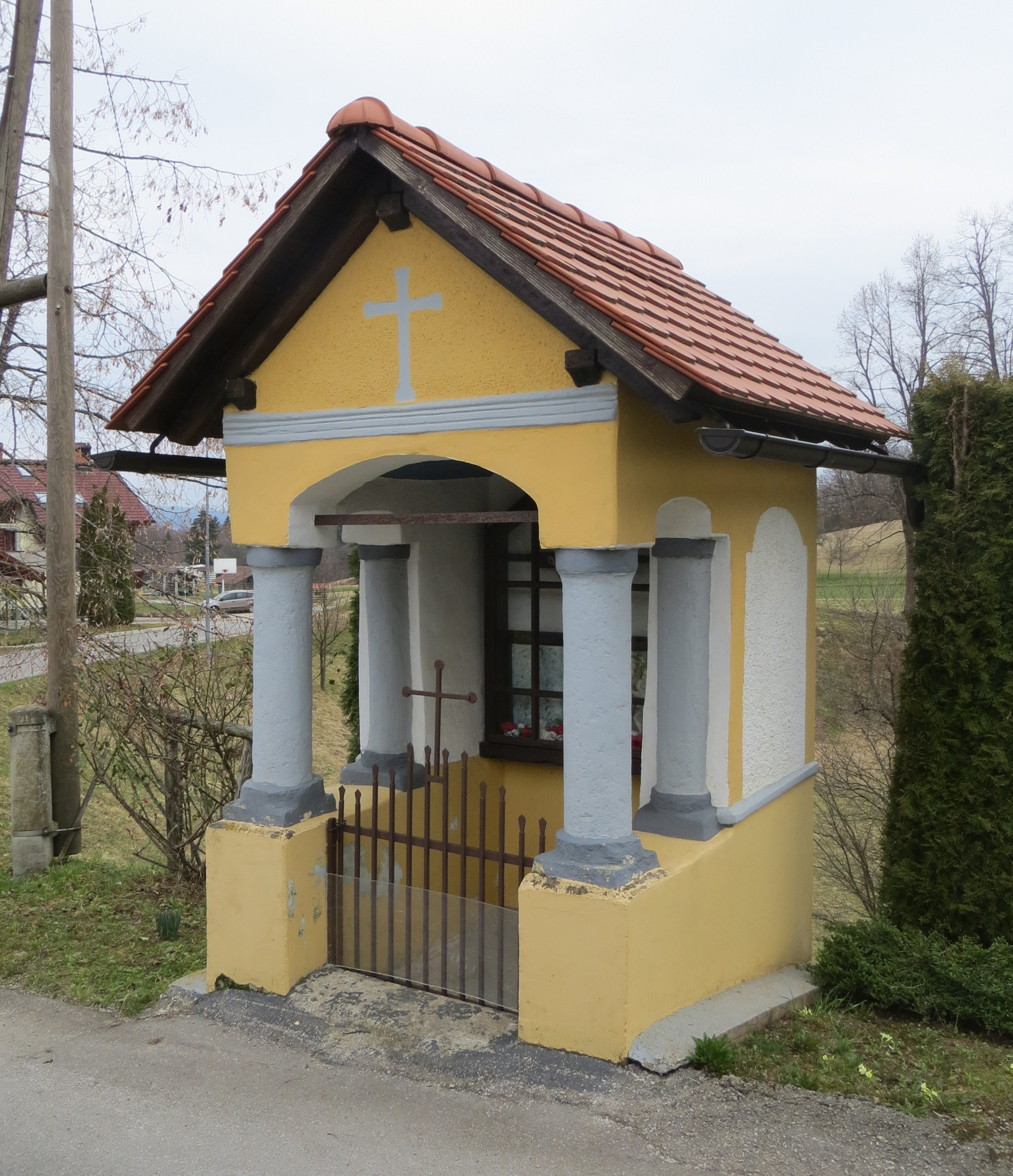
Chapel-shrine

Religious heritage in Sarsko

The local church is dedicated to Saint Rupert and belongs to the Parish of Ig. It was a Romanesque building of which the nave survives. The nave was extended with a Gothic sanctuary and belfry. In the 17th century it was refurbished in the Baroque style.

South of the church, along the main road to Ig, and just north of the village core, is an open chapel-shrine. It dates from the end of the 19th century and contains a crucifix.
