= Visoko, Ig =

Visoko
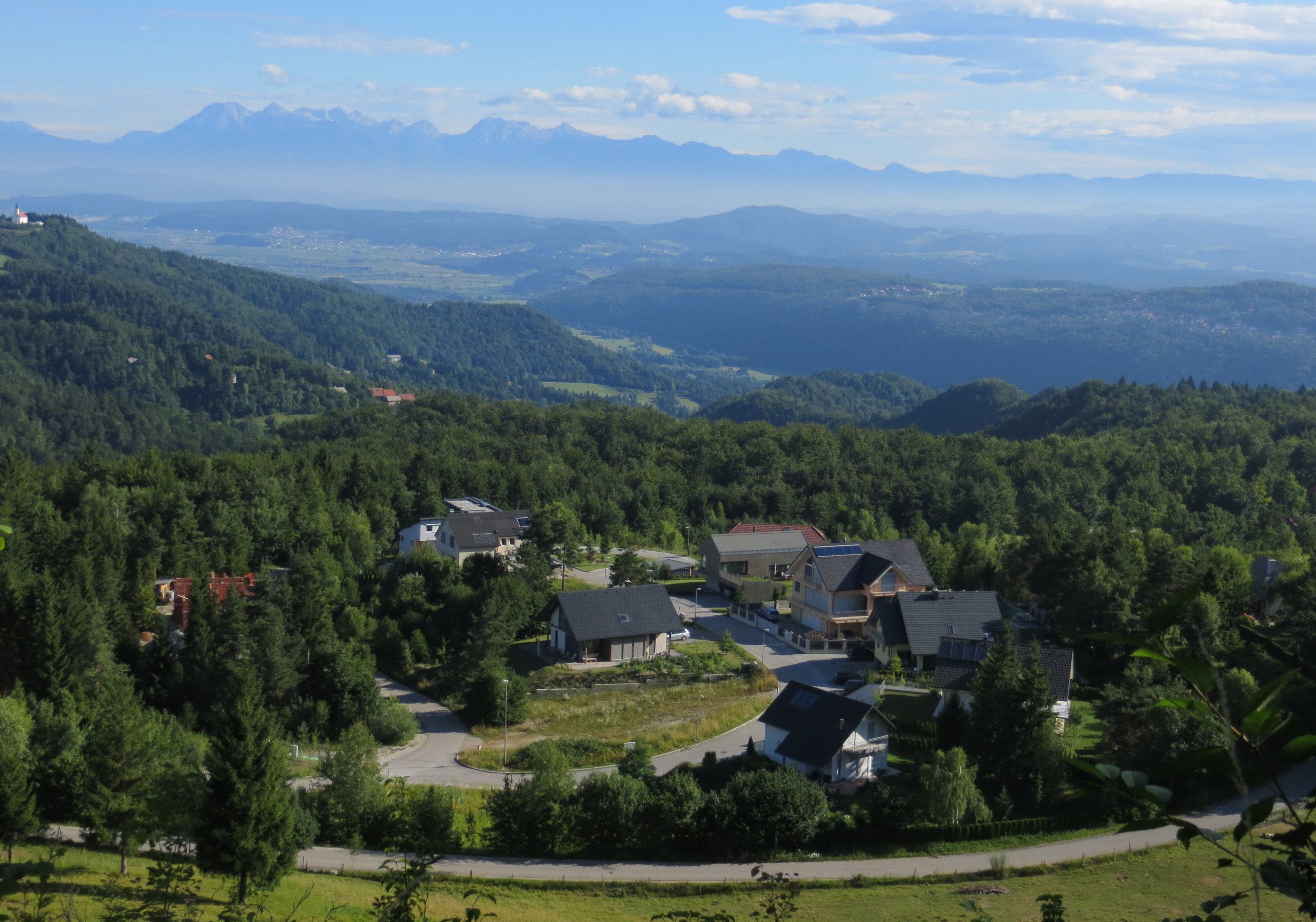

- Location in Slovenia
- Coordinates: 45°53′6.12″N 14°34′32.12″E
- Country: Slovenia
- Traditional region: Inner Carniola
- Statistical region: Central Slovenia
- Municipality: Ig

Area
  - Total: 5.45 km^{2} (2.10 sq mi)
- Elevation: 634.1 m (2,080 ft)

Population (2002)
  - Total: 116

Visoko (pronounced [ʋiˈsɔːkɔ]) is a village in the Municipality of Ig in central Slovenia. The municipality is part of the traditional region of Inner Carniola and is now included in the Central Slovenia Statistical Region. The hamlet west of the main settlement was formerly known as Mokrice (German: Mokritz).

== Churches ==
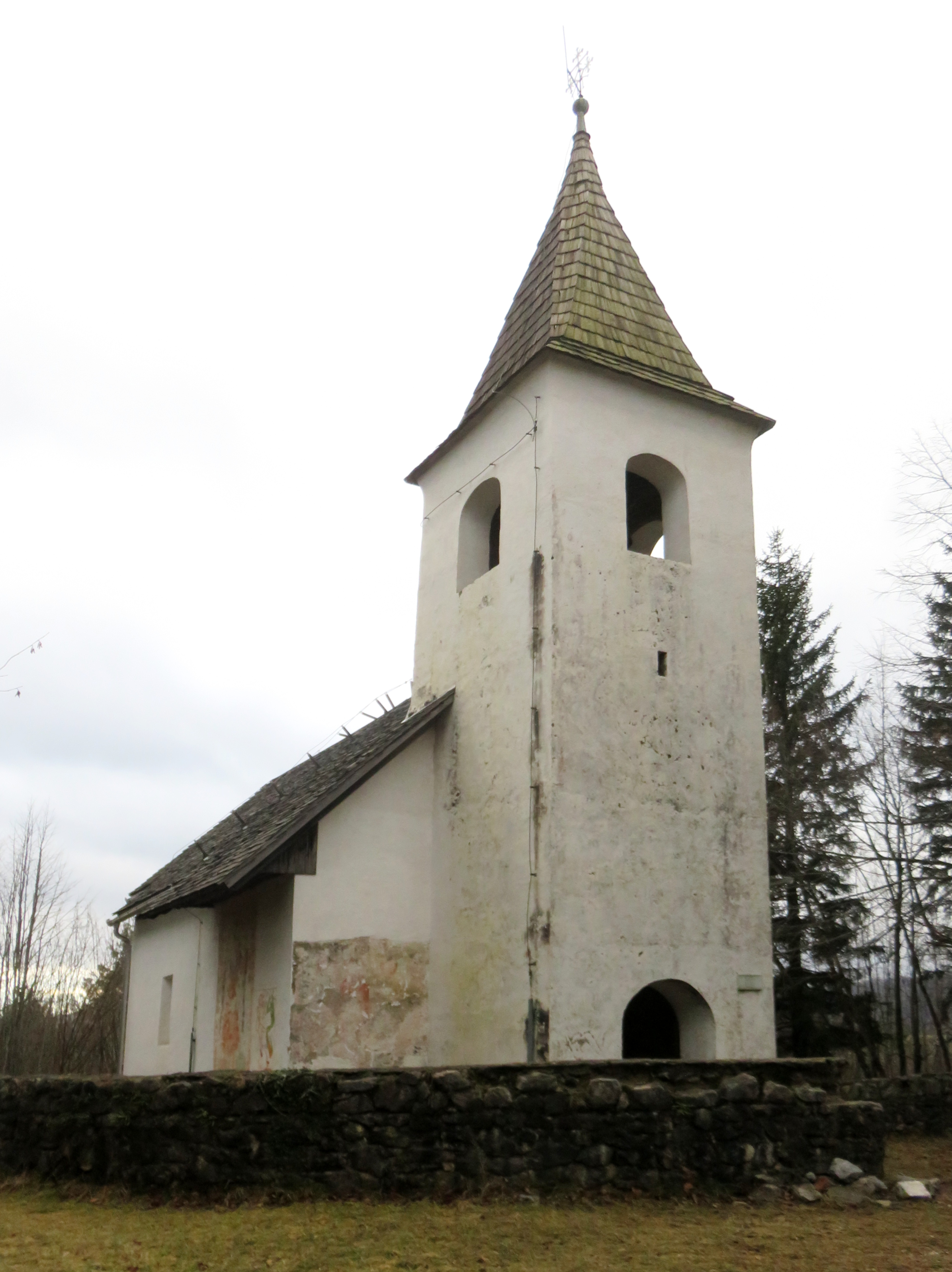
View from the north

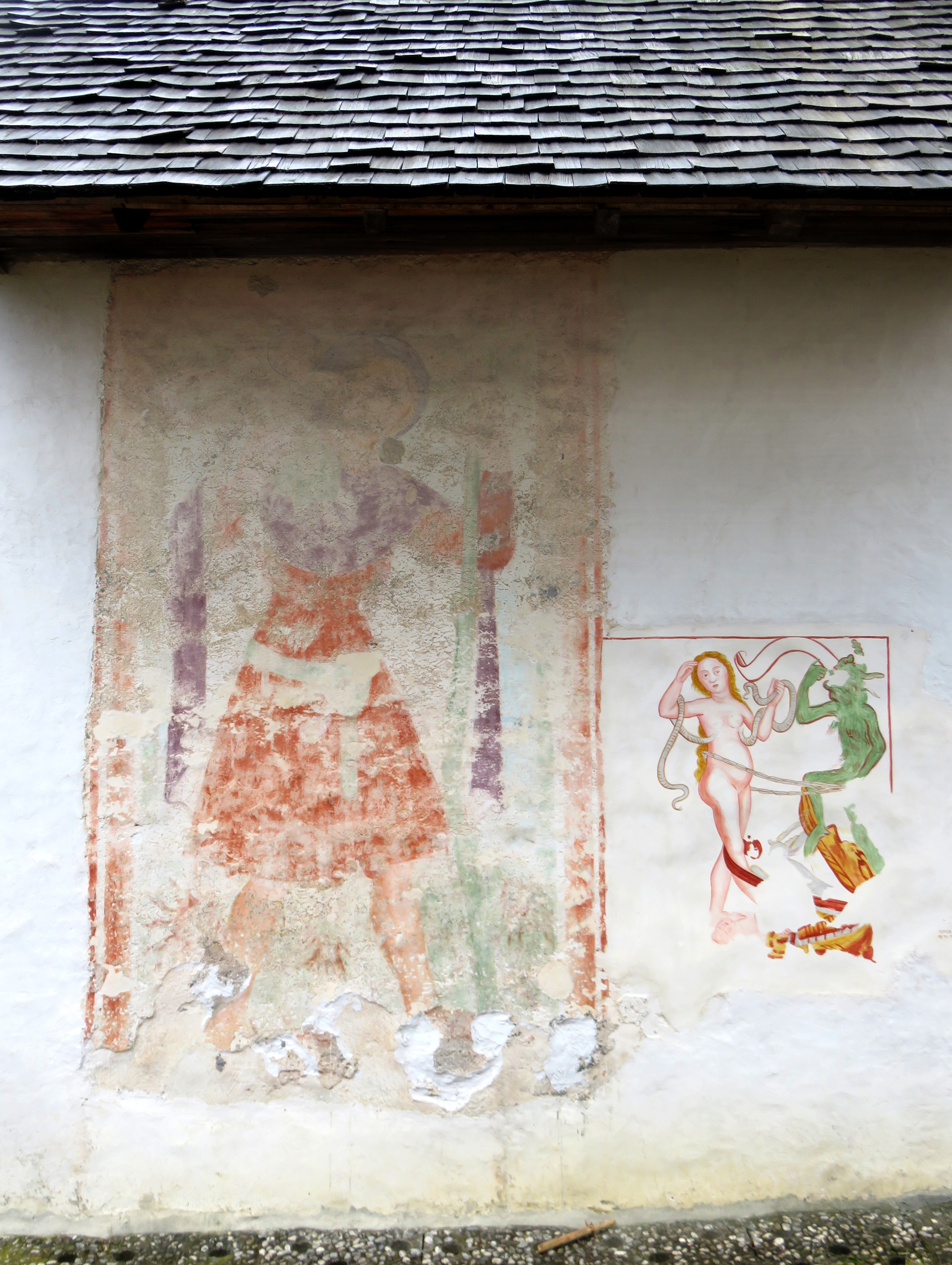
Frescoes

Saint Nicholas's Church

The local church, built on a small hill southeast of the settlement, is dedicated to Saint Nicholas. It dates to the early 15th century. A second church on Kurešček Hill west of the settlement is dedicated to the Nativity of Mary. Both belong to the Parish of Ig.

The first church on Kurešček Hill was built in the 15th century. It became a pilgrimage site and was remodeled several times over the centuries, acquiring a Baroque style in the 18th century. The church was only slightly damaged during the Second World War, but the communist authorities forbade repairs to it. The roof was soon destroyed by wind and the interior vandalized, and in 1950 a damaged statue of the Virgin Mary was retrieved from the church. A fire on April 30, 1970 destroyed the bell tower. Work to rebuild the church started in March 1991, and it was consecrated by Archbishop Alojzij Šuštar on August 30, 1992. There is a cemetery below the church.
