= Selnik, Ig =

Selnik
- Location in Slovenia
- Coordinates: 45°54′13.29″N 14°33′37.32″E
- Country: Slovenia
- Traditional region: Inner Carniola
- Statistical region: Central Slovenia
- Municipality: Ig

Area
  - Total: 2.03 km^{2} (0.78 sq mi)
- Elevation: 563.8 m (1,850 ft)

Population (2002)
  - Total: 39
- Postal code: 1292

Selnik (pronounced [ˈseːu̯nik]) is a village east of Golo in the Municipality of Ig in central Slovenia. The entire municipality is part of the traditional region of Inner Carniola and is now included in the Central Slovenia Statistical Region.

A small chapel-shrine in the settlement is dedicated to the Virgin Mary and was built in the early 20th century.
