= Dobravica, Ig =

Dobravica
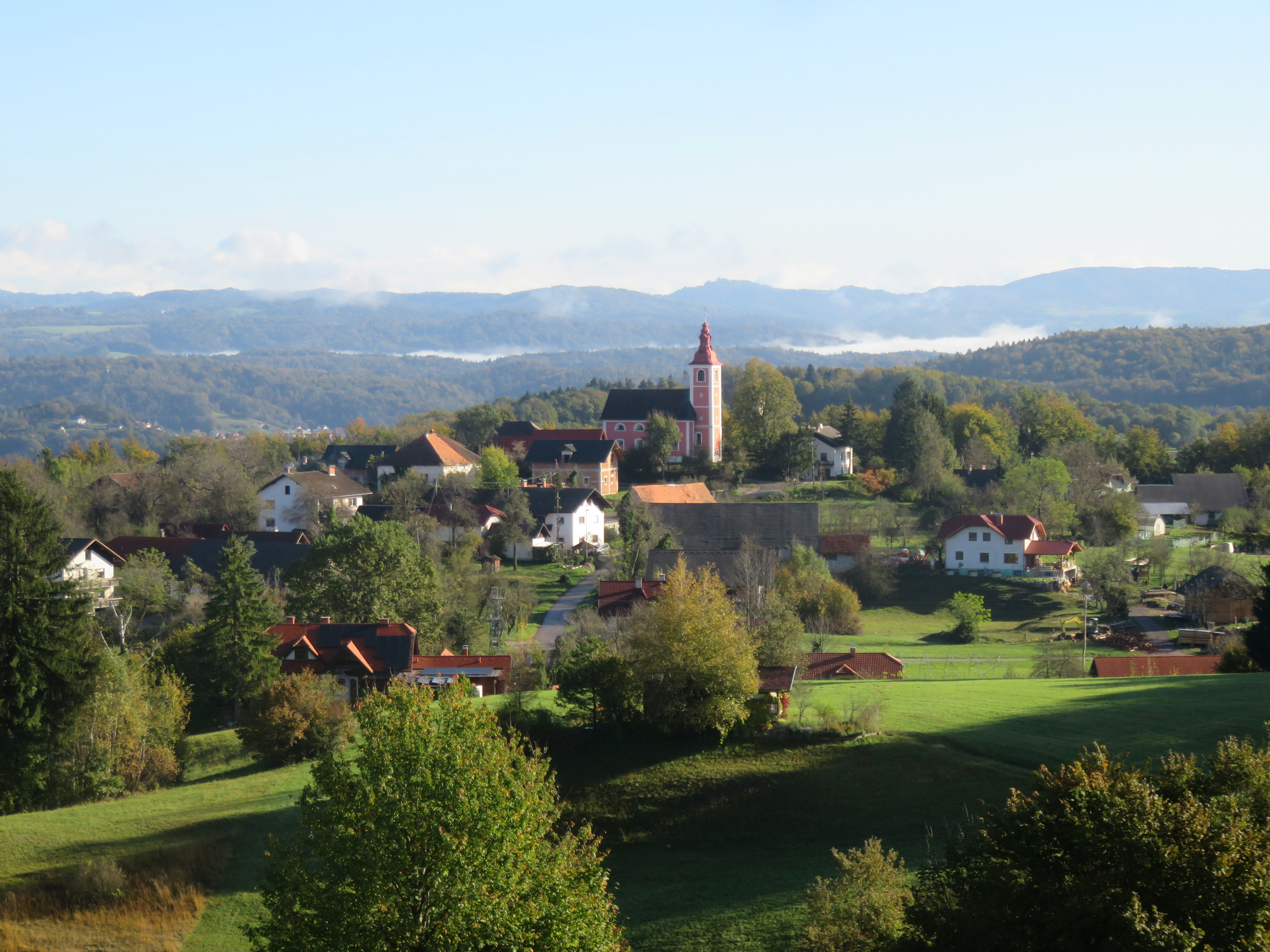

- Location in Slovenia
- Coordinates: 45°56′19.03″N 14°32′30.41″E
- Country: Slovenia
- Traditional region: Inner Carniola
- Statistical region: Central Slovenia
- Municipality: Ig

Area
  - Total: 3.72 km^{2} (1.44 sq mi)
- Elevation: 422.7 m (1,387 ft)

Population (2002)
  - Total: 141
- Postal code: 1292

Dobravica (pronounced [dɔˈbɾaːʋitsa]; German: Dobrauza) is a settlement in the Municipality of Ig in central Slovenia. The municipality is part of the traditional region of Inner Carniola and is now included in the Central Slovenia Statistical Region.

== Church ==
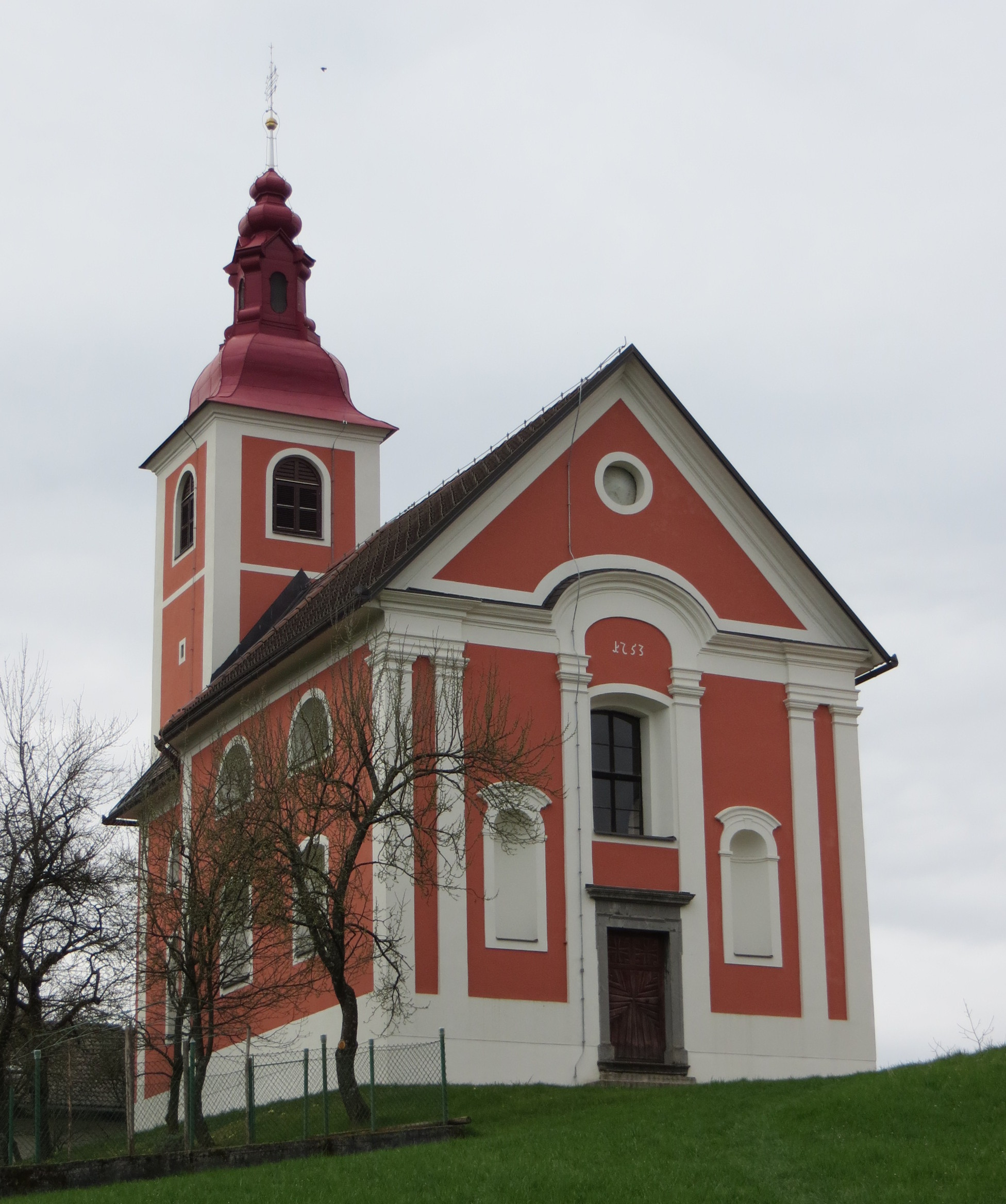
Saint Gregory's Church

The local church, built on a small hill in the centre of the settlement, is dedicated to Saint Gregory and belongs to the Parish of Ig. It is a Baroque church, built in the mid-18th century.
