= Tomišelj =

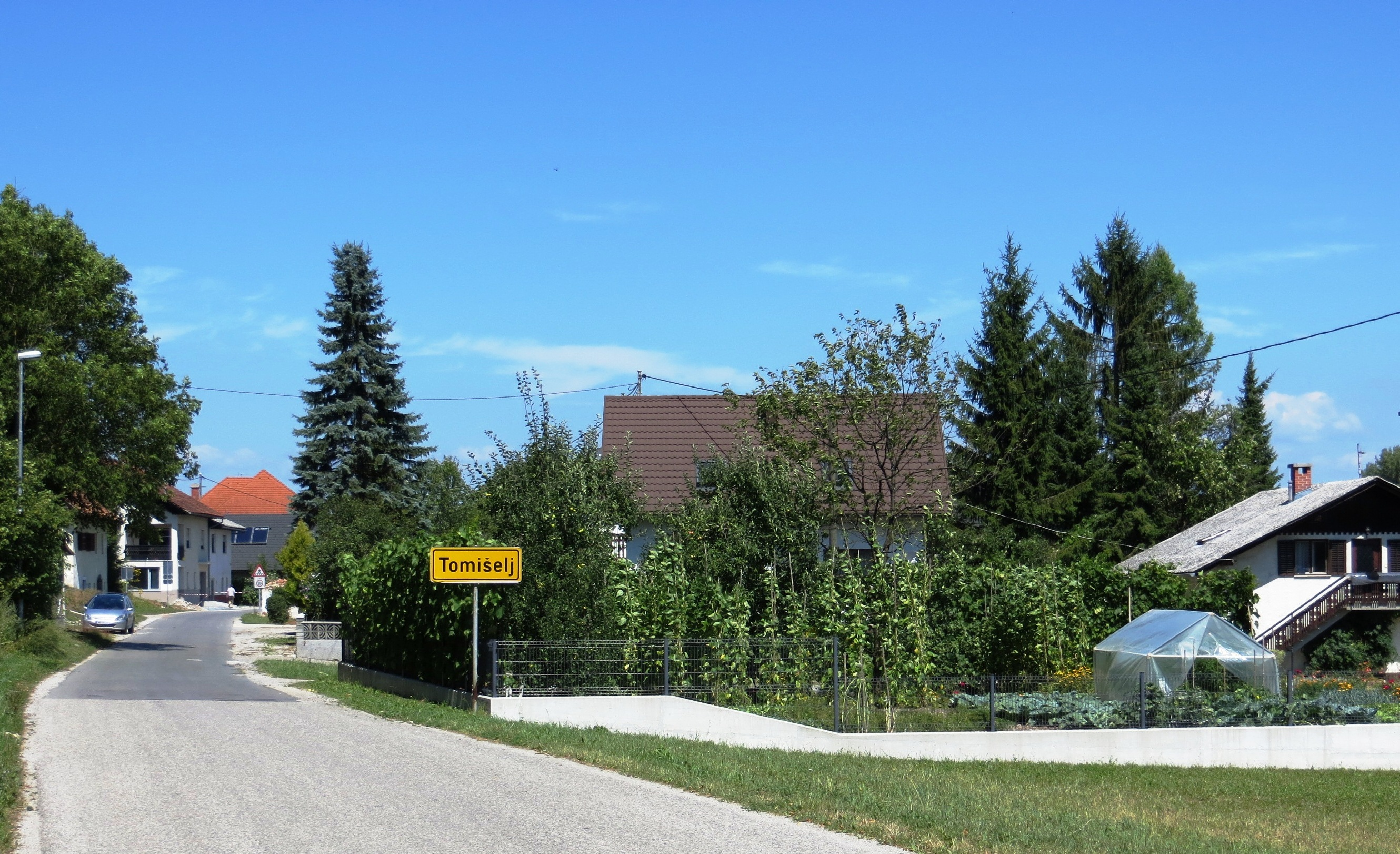

- Location in Slovenia
- Coordinates: 45°57′49.77″N 14°28′51.35″E
- Country: Slovenia
- Traditional region: Inner Carniola
- Statistical region: Central Slovenia
- Municipality: Ig

Area
  - Total: 6.89 km^{2} (2.66 sq mi)
- Elevation: 301.2 m (988 ft)

Population (2002)
  - Total: 297
- Postal code: 1292

Tomišelj (pronounced [tɔˈmiːʃəl]; German: Tomischl) is a village in the Municipality of Ig in central Slovenia, on the edge of the marshland south of the capital Ljubljana. The municipality is part of the traditional region of Inner Carniola and is now included in the Central Slovenia Statistical Region.

== Name ==
Tomišelj was attested in written records in 1397 and 1436 as Domischel (and as Thomuschl in 1415 and Tomischel in 1468). The name was nominalized from an adjective form of a hypocorism, which would have been *Tomisel, and the name therefore means 'Tomisel's village'. In the past the German name was Tomischl.

== Church ==
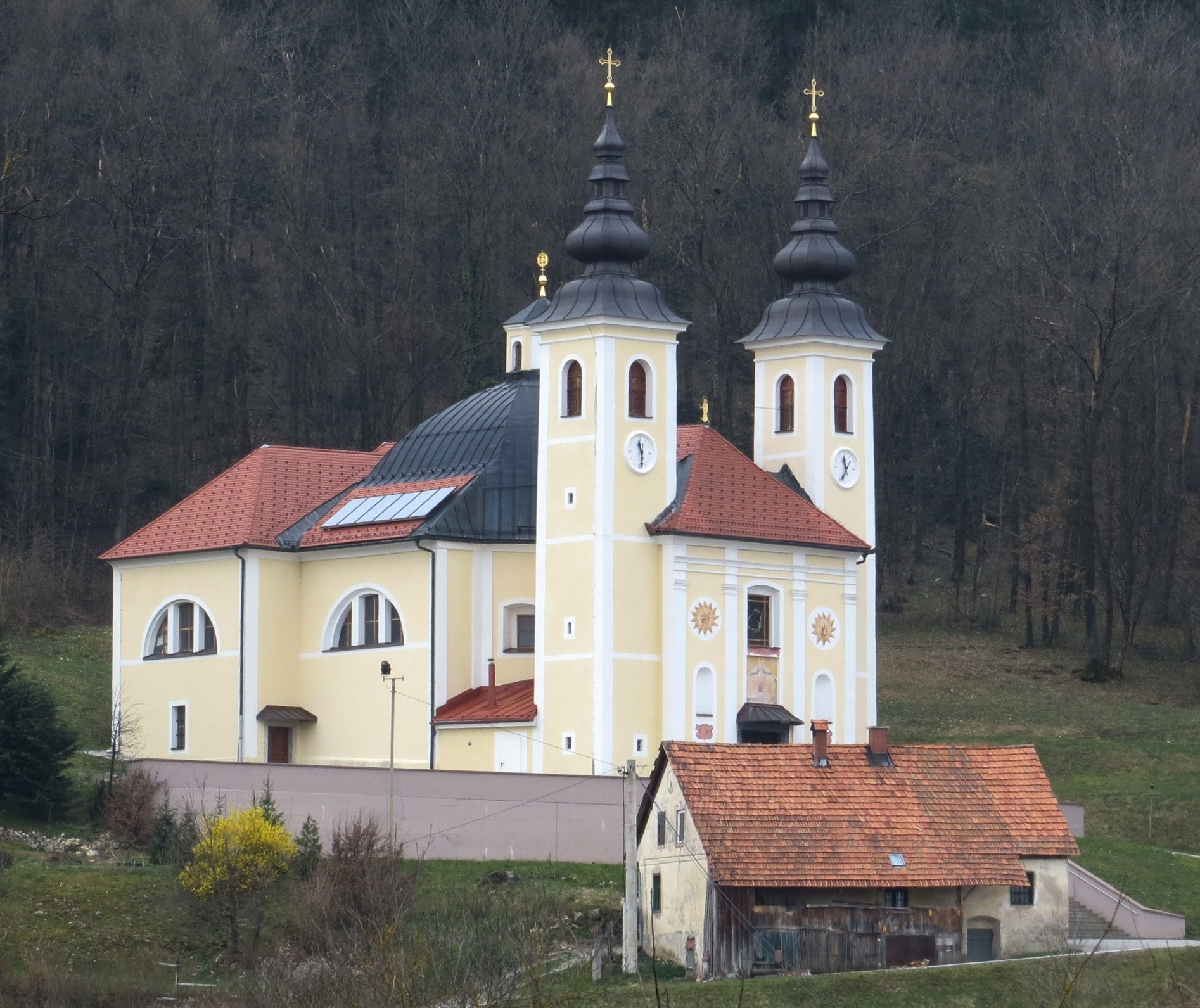
Our Lady of the Rosary Church

The local parish church is dedicated to Our Lady of the Rosary and belongs to the Roman Catholic Archdiocese of Ljubljana. It was built by Gregor Maček Sr., at the initiative of Mihael Omersa from 1720 until 1724 on the site of a small predecessor church, where the oldest votive deposit dated to 1519 according to an old urbarium.
