= Rupe, Velike Lašče =

Rupe
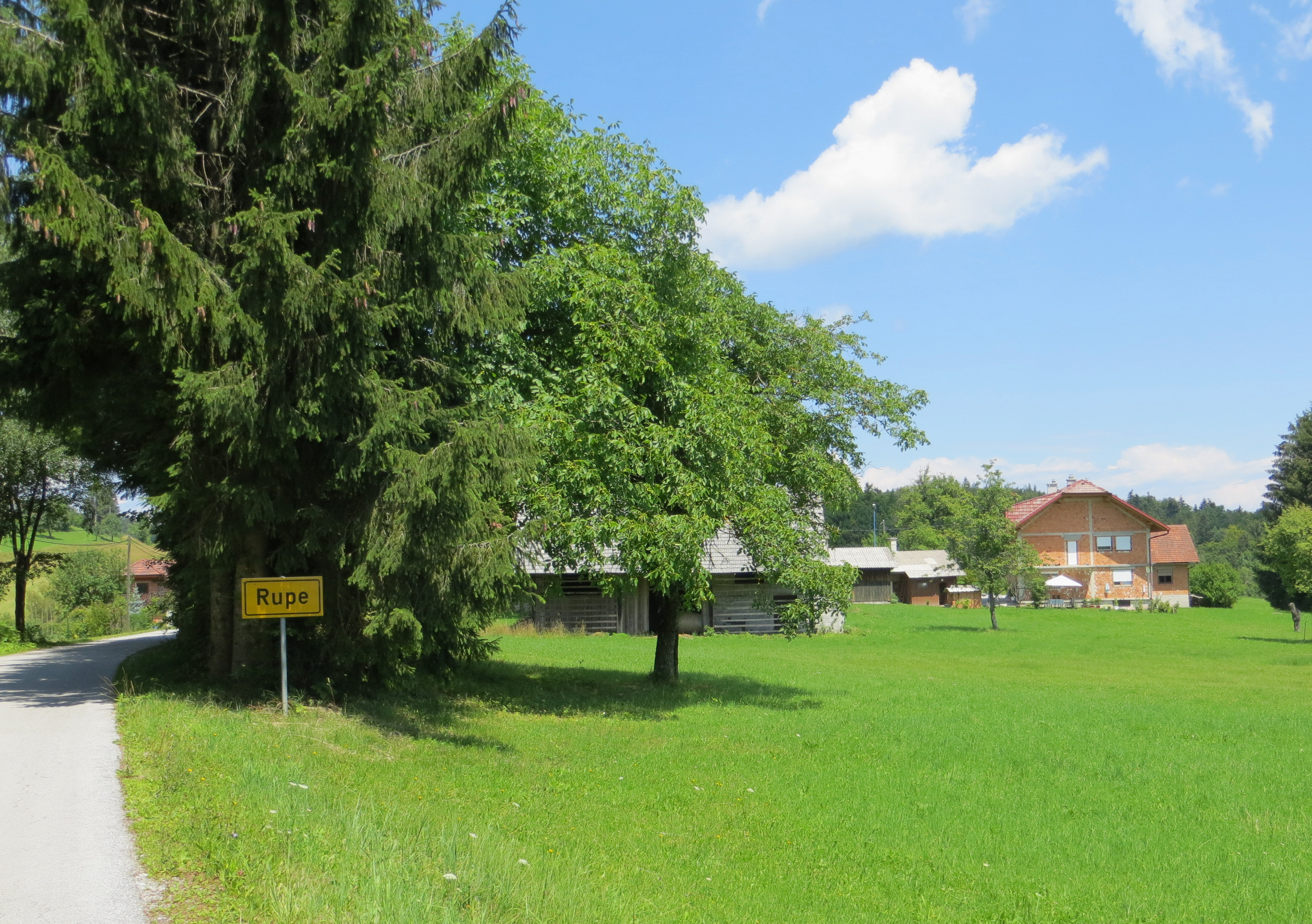

- Location in Slovenia
- Coordinates: 45°49′37.67″N 14°32′26.27″E
- Country: Slovenia
- Traditional region: Lower Carniola
- Statistical region: Central Slovenia
- Municipality: Velike Lašče

Area
  - Total: 1.07 km^{2} (0.41 sq mi)
- Elevation: 805.2 m (2,642 ft)

Population (2002)
  - Total: 4
- Postal code: 1314

Rupe (pronounced [ˈɾuːpɛ]) is a small remote settlement in the hills south of Rob in the Municipality of Velike Lašče in central Slovenia. The entire municipality is part of the traditional region of Lower Carniola and is now included in the Central Slovenia Statistical Region.

== Geography ==
Rupe is a clustered village on the Rute Plateau (Slovene: Rutarska planota) along the road from Selo pri Robu to Mohorje. The Ograje hay field lies north of the village. The Graben area to the west contains many springs, and above this is Selan Crag (Selanska peč) and the Matejec Clearing (Matejčev laz) with tilled fields and hay fields. To the south are the Zglavnice fields, and to the southeast meadows and terraced fields. To the east are hay fields in an area known as Lošca, with a road leading to Dednik and a trail through the woods offering a shortcut to Rob. The area also has a deep karst shaft surrounded by many depressions. The soil is sandy loam. Near the road there is an intermittent spring with a walled outlet.

The farms in Rupe are small and there is little agricultural production because of the harsh climate; most of the villagers were tenant farmers in the past. The houses have pear and apple orchards. Economic activity was based on the production of wooden ware, especially wooden spoons, crates for fruit, and toothpicks. There was also some charcoal production, and mushrooms and blueberries were gathered and sold, especially in the Lošca area.

== Name ==
The name Rupe is a plural form of the Slovene common noun rupa 'cave, sinkhole, depression', therefore referring to a local geographical feature.

== History ==
During the Italian offensive in the summer of 1942, Italian forces burned some of the houses in the village. On 26 July 1942 one of the villagers was shot at Veliki Vrh.
