= Bukovec, Velike Lašče =

Bukovec
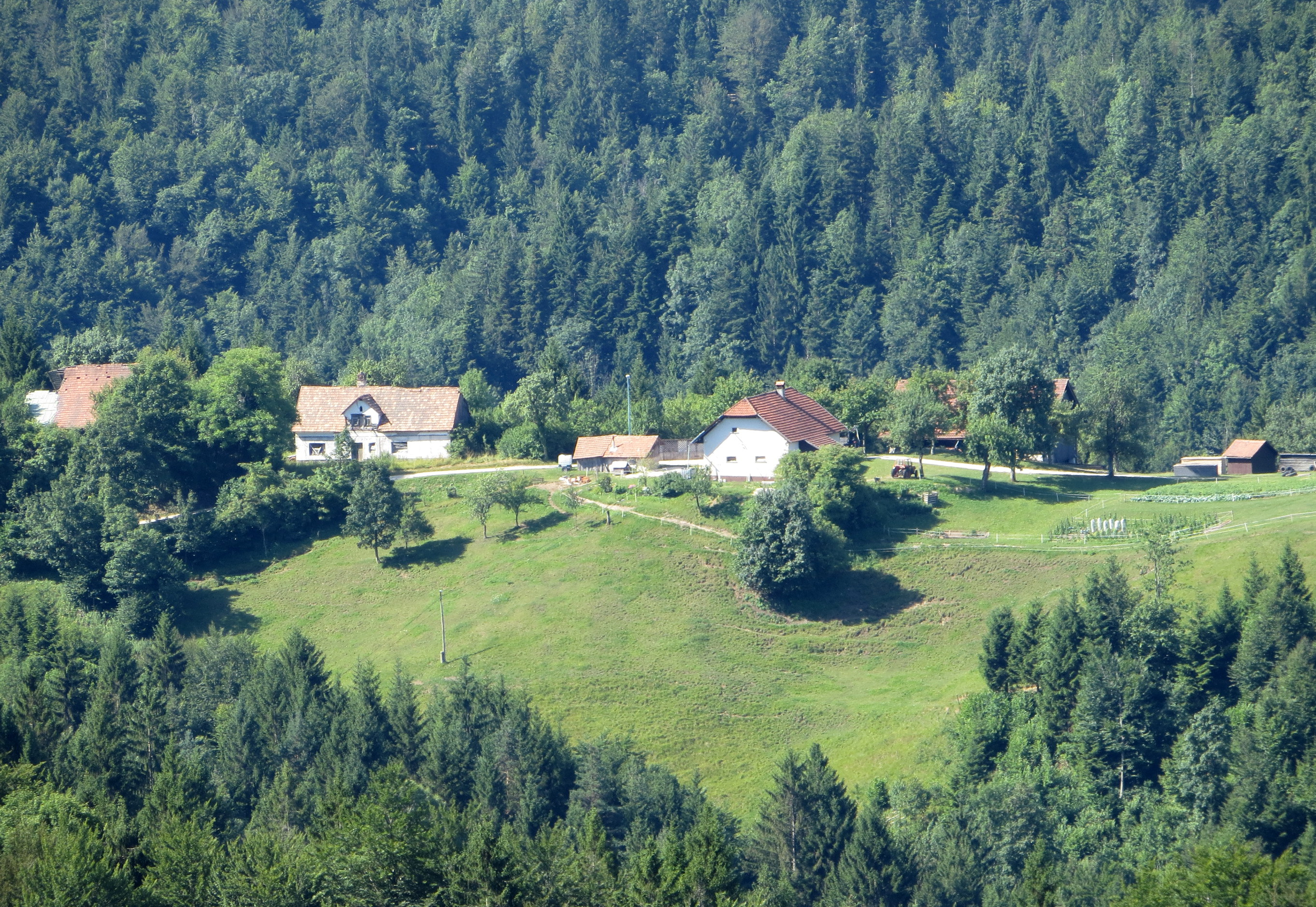

- Location in Slovenia
- Coordinates: 45°51′8.49″N 14°30′18.98″E
- Country: Slovenia
- Traditional region: Lower Carniola
- Statistical region: Central Slovenia
- Municipality: Velike Lašče

Area
  - Total: 3.01 km^{2} (1.16 sq mi)
- Elevation: 682.2 m (2,238 ft)

Population (2002)
  - Total: 5
- Postal code: 1314

Bukovec (pronounced [ˈbuːkɔʋəts]; in older sources also Bukovica, German: Bukowitz) is a small remote settlement in the hills on the edge of the Municipality of Velike Lašče in Slovenia. Traditionally the area is part of the Lower Carniola region. It is now included in the Central Slovenia Statistical Region.

== Name ==
The name Bukovec is derived from the common noun bukev 'beech'. Like similar toponyms in Slovenia (e.g., Bukovica, Bukovo, Bukovje), it originally referred to the local vegetation. In the past the German name was Bukowitz.

== History ==
During the Second World War, the Partisans often took refuge in Bukovec, and the commands of various Partisan brigades operated in the area. On 22 March 1942, Italian forces burned all of the houses in the village.

=== Mass graves ===
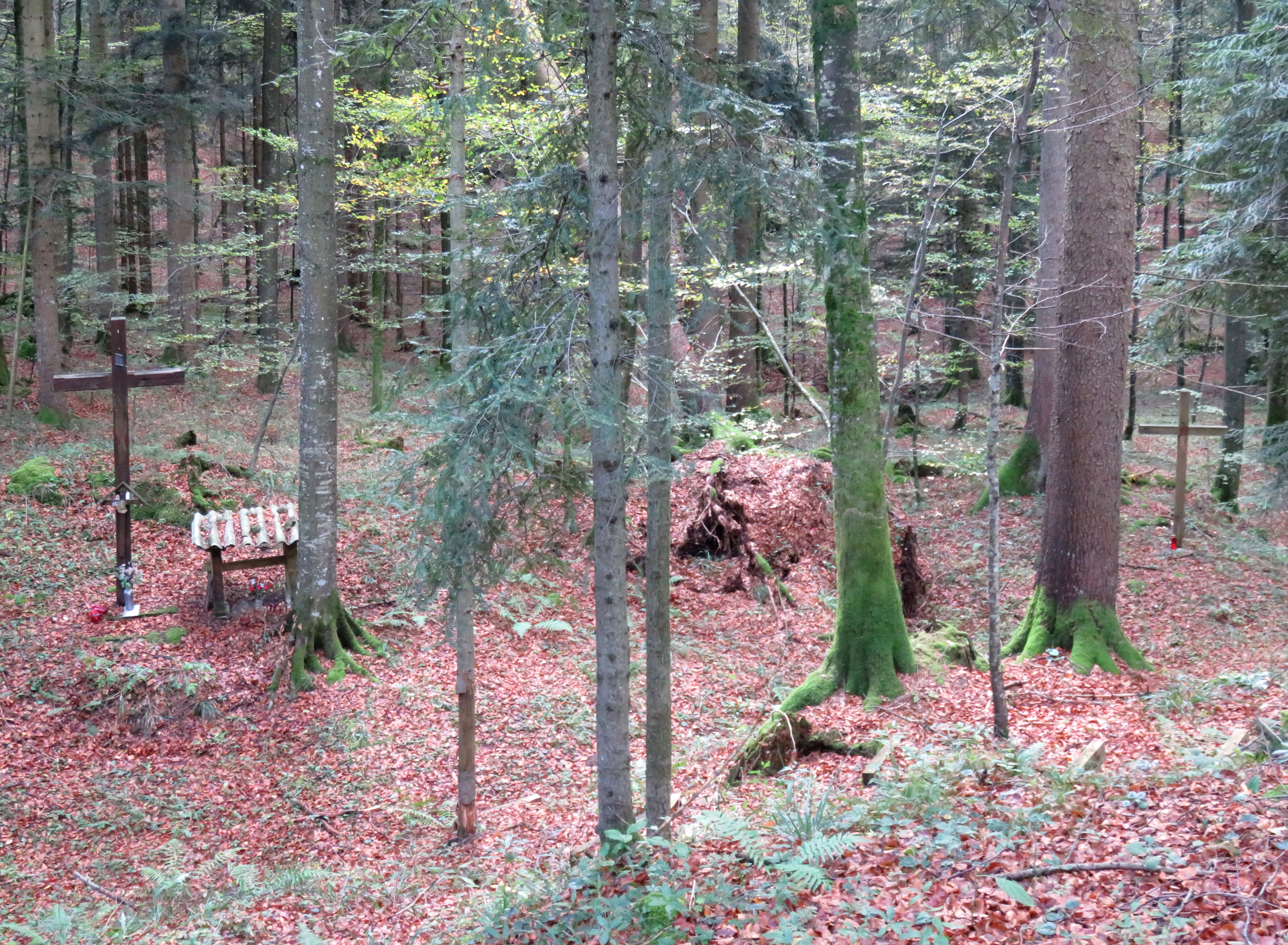
Mačkovec Mass Grave

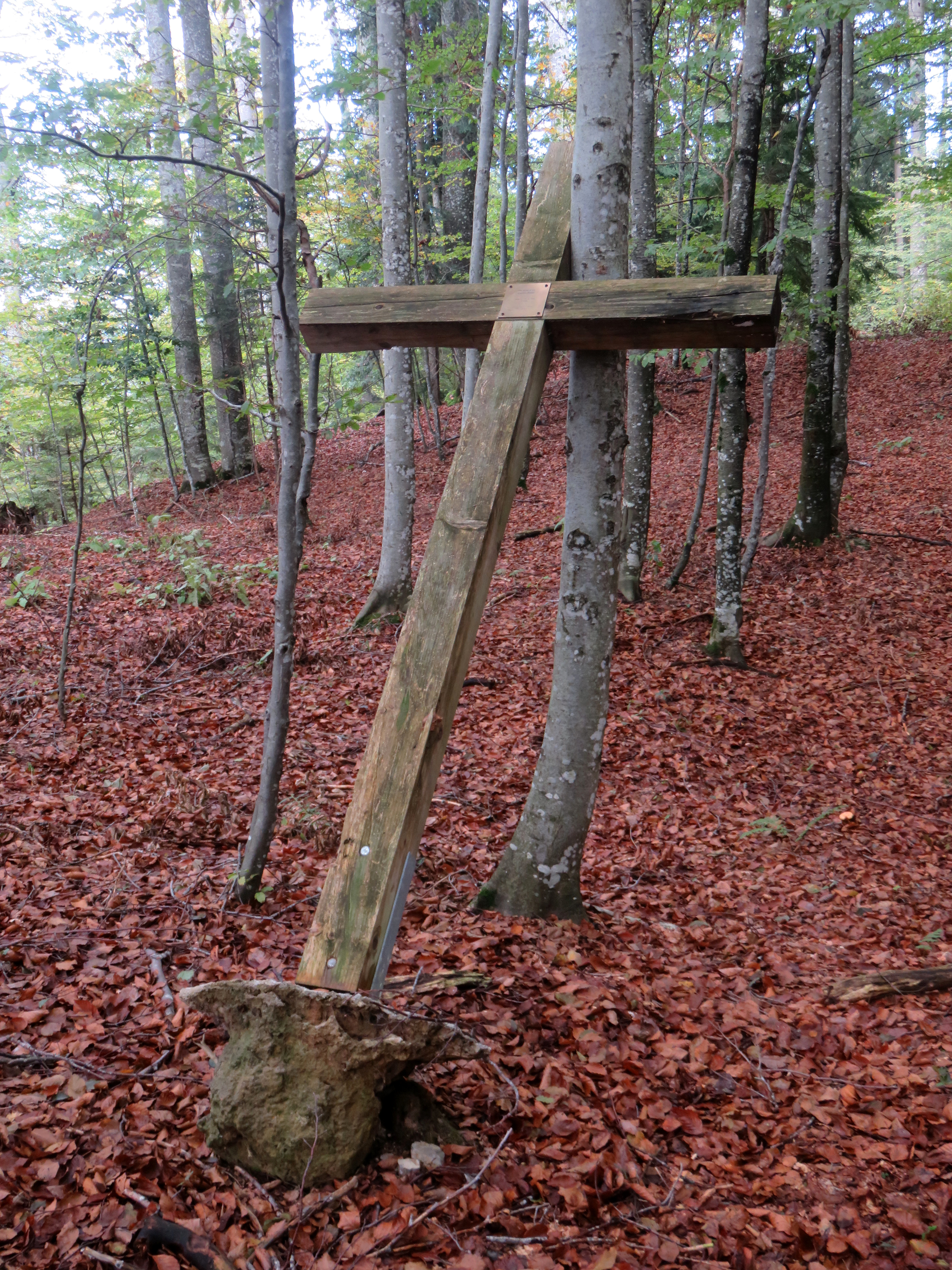
Romani Mass Grave

Bukovec is the site of three known mass graves associated with the Second World War. The Mačkovec Mass Grave (Slovene: Grobišče Mačkovec) is located in the woods southeast of the settlement. Its location is marked by crosses cut into the trunks of two trees. It contained the remains of about 40 prisoners of war, mostly members of the Anti-Communist Volunteer Militia, that were taken from the prison in Ribnica and murdered at the site on 27 or 28 October 1943 by the Partisan Loka Brigade. In October 2013 the remains were disinterred and reburied at the cemetery in Begunje pri Cerknici. The Italian Soldiers Mass Grave (Grobišče italijanskih vojakov) is located in the woods south of Bukovec, below the north slope of Mačkovec Hill. It contains the remains of Italian soldiers. The Romani Mass Grave (Grobišče Romov) is located in the woods south of Bukovec near the Janez Klančar Grave in the territory of neighboring Selo pri Robu, which is marked with a cross. It contains the remains of Romani murdered at the site by a Partisan group led by Stane Semič.
