= Logarji =

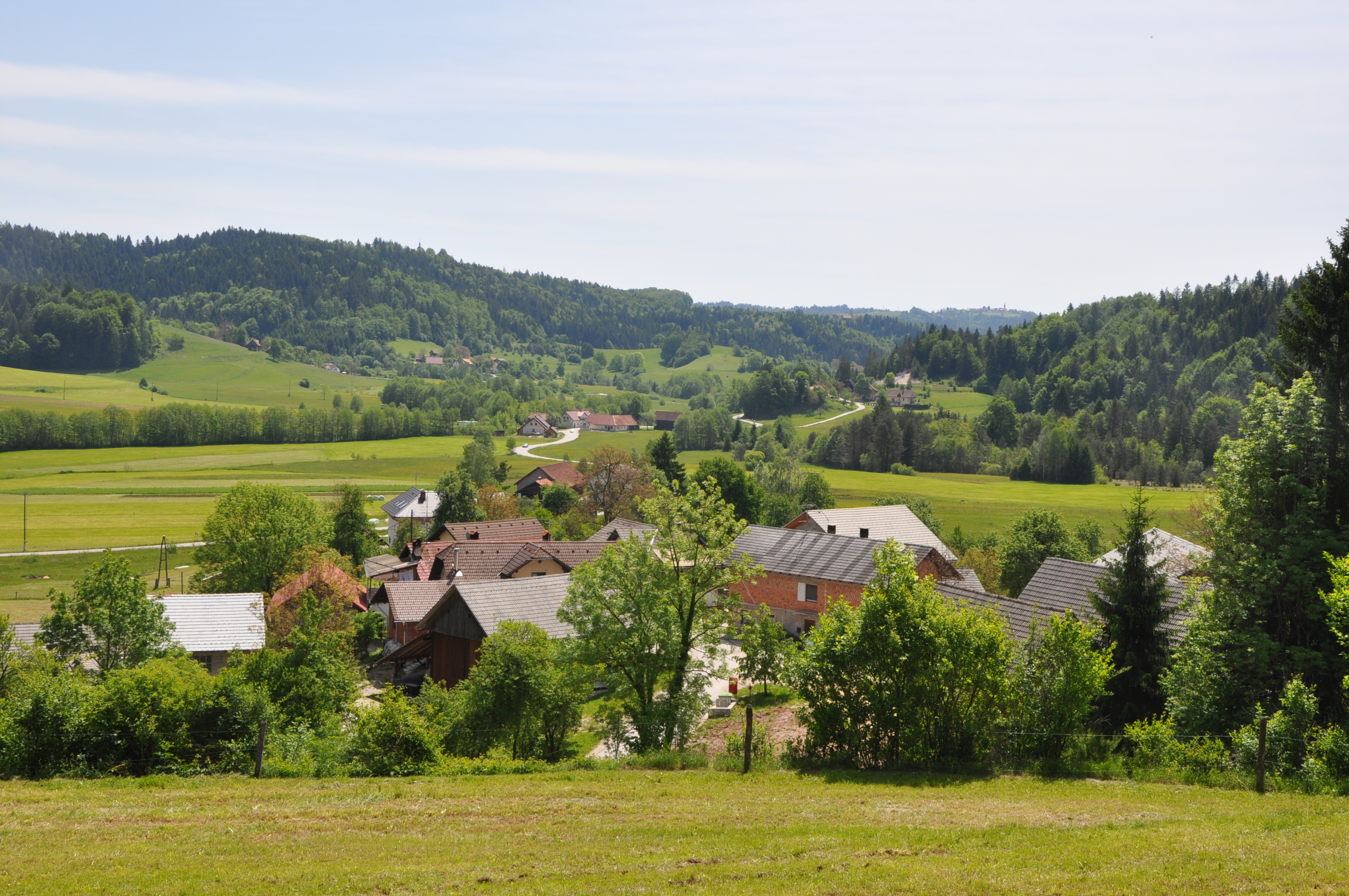

- Location in Slovenia
- Coordinates: 45°49′43.22″N 14°35′27.87″E
- Country: Slovenia
- Traditional region: Lower Carniola
- Statistical region: Central Slovenia
- Municipality: Velike Lašče

Area
  - Total: 0.3 km^{2} (0.12 sq mi)
- Elevation: 516 m (1,693 ft)

Population (2002)
  - Total: 30
- Postal code: 1315

Logarji (pronounced [ˈloːɡaɾji]) is a small settlement in the Mišja Valley (Slovene: Mišja dolina) west of Velike Lašče in central Slovenia. The entire Municipality of Velike Lašče is part of the traditional region of Lower Carniola and is now included in the Central Slovenia Statistical Region.

== Name ==
The name Logarji is a collective toponym, referring to a settlement where several people with the surname Logar lived.

== Mass grave ==
Logarji is the site of a mass grave associated with the Second World War. The Oplotje Cave Mass Grave (Slovene: Grobišče Jama Oplotje) is located south of a forest road in the woods southwest of the village. It contains the remains of undetermined victims.

== Cultural heritage ==
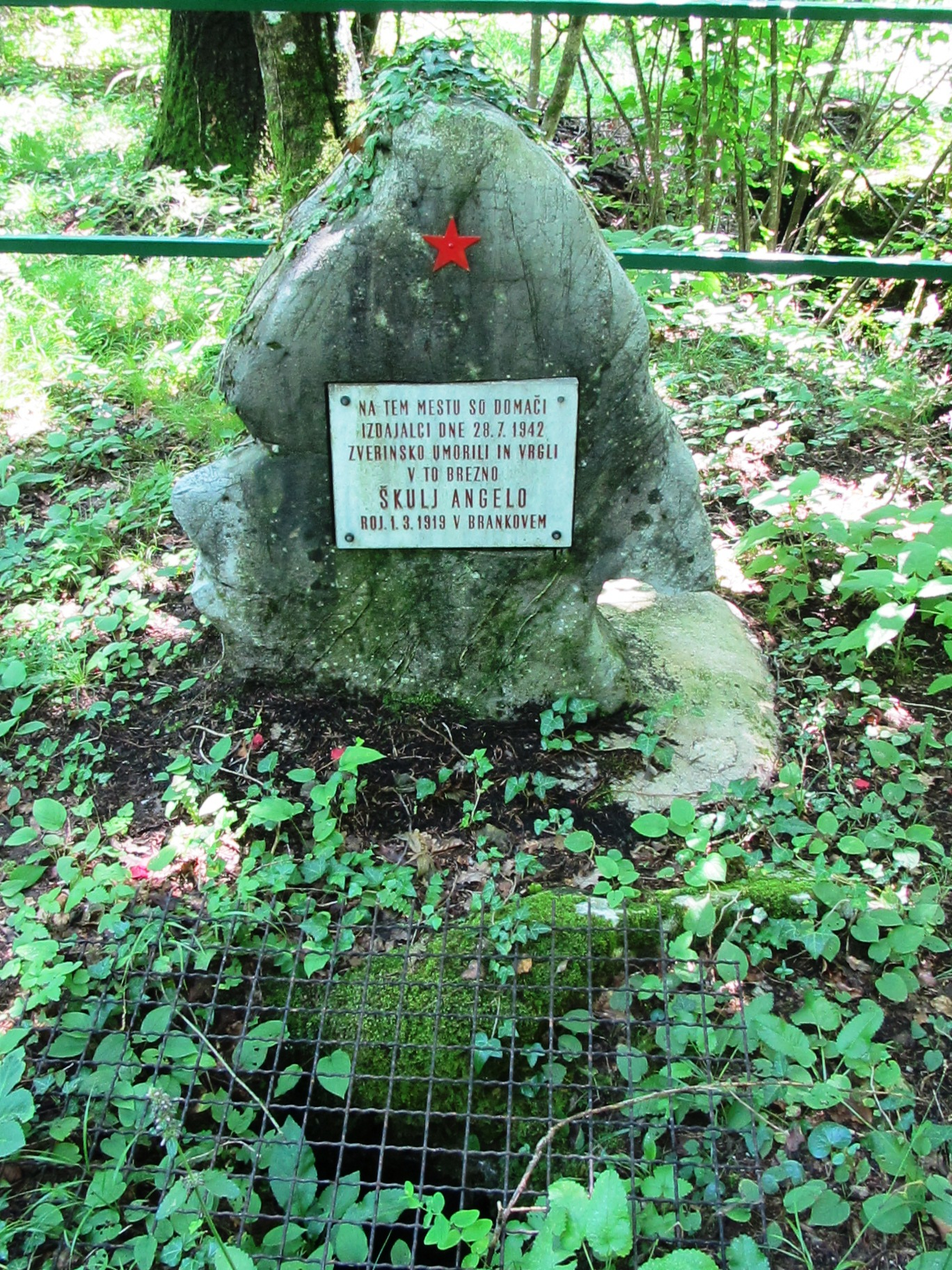
Memorial to Angela Škulj

In the forest southwest of Logarji, south of the road to Zgonče, there is also a memorial to Angela Škulj (1919–1942) from Brankovo, who was killed by Village Guard forces. The monument consists of a rough stone pyramid with a plaque affixed to it. The memorial is surrounded by a metal fence and was unveiled in 1980.
