= Boštetje =

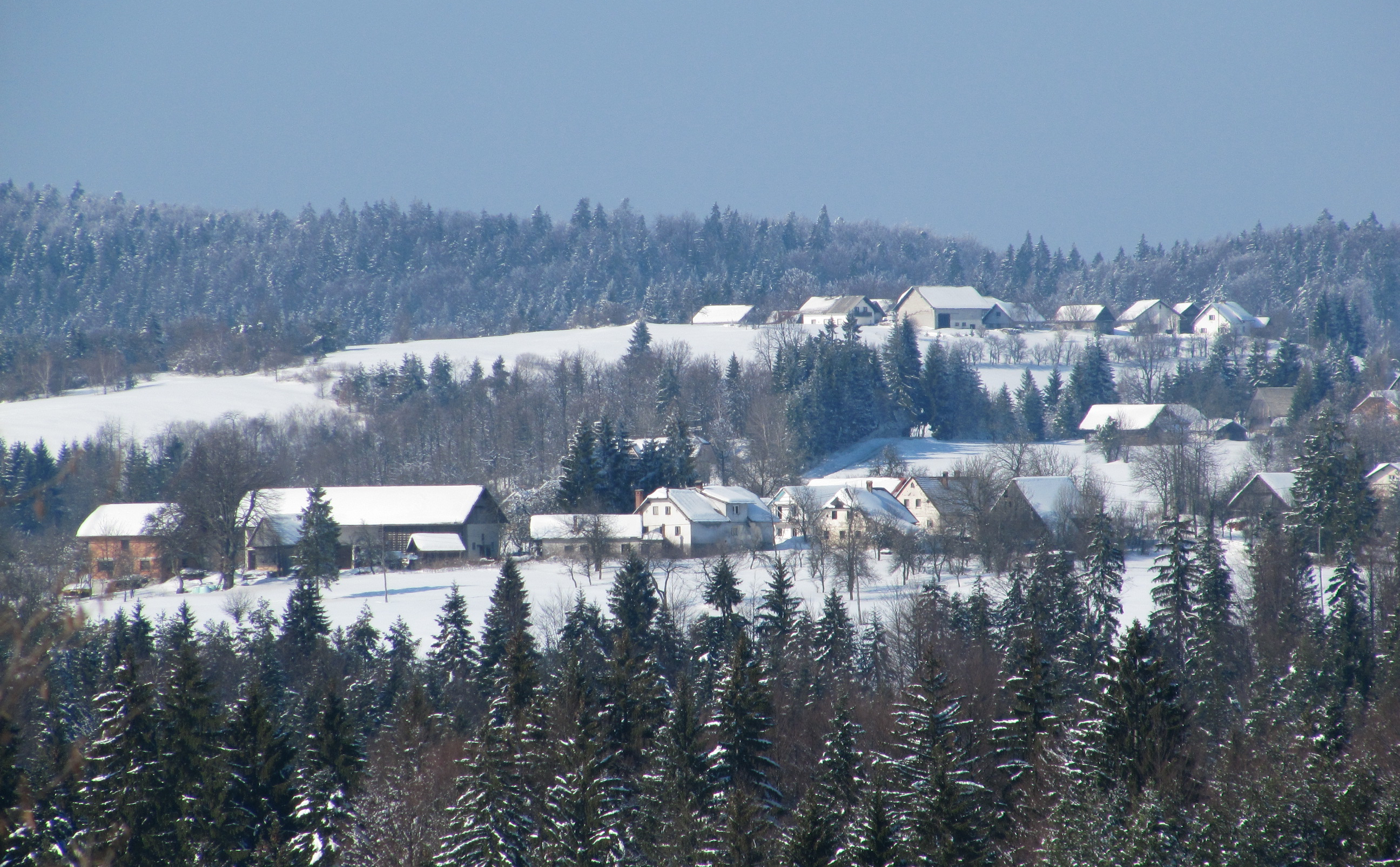

- Location in Slovenia
- Coordinates: 45°49′14.75″N 14°32′46.38″E
- Country: Slovenia
- Traditional region: Lower Carniola
- Statistical region: Central Slovenia
- Municipality: Velike Lašče

Area
  - Total: 0.73 km^{2} (0.28 sq mi)
- Elevation: 792 m (2,598 ft)

Population (2002)
  - Total: 8
- Postal code: 1314

Boštetje (pronounced [bɔˈʃteːtjɛ]) is a small settlement on the Rute Plateau (Slovene: Rutarska planota) in the hills west of Velike Lašče in Slovenia. The area is included in the Central Slovenia Statistical Region. Traditionally it was part of Lower Carniola.
