= Naredi =

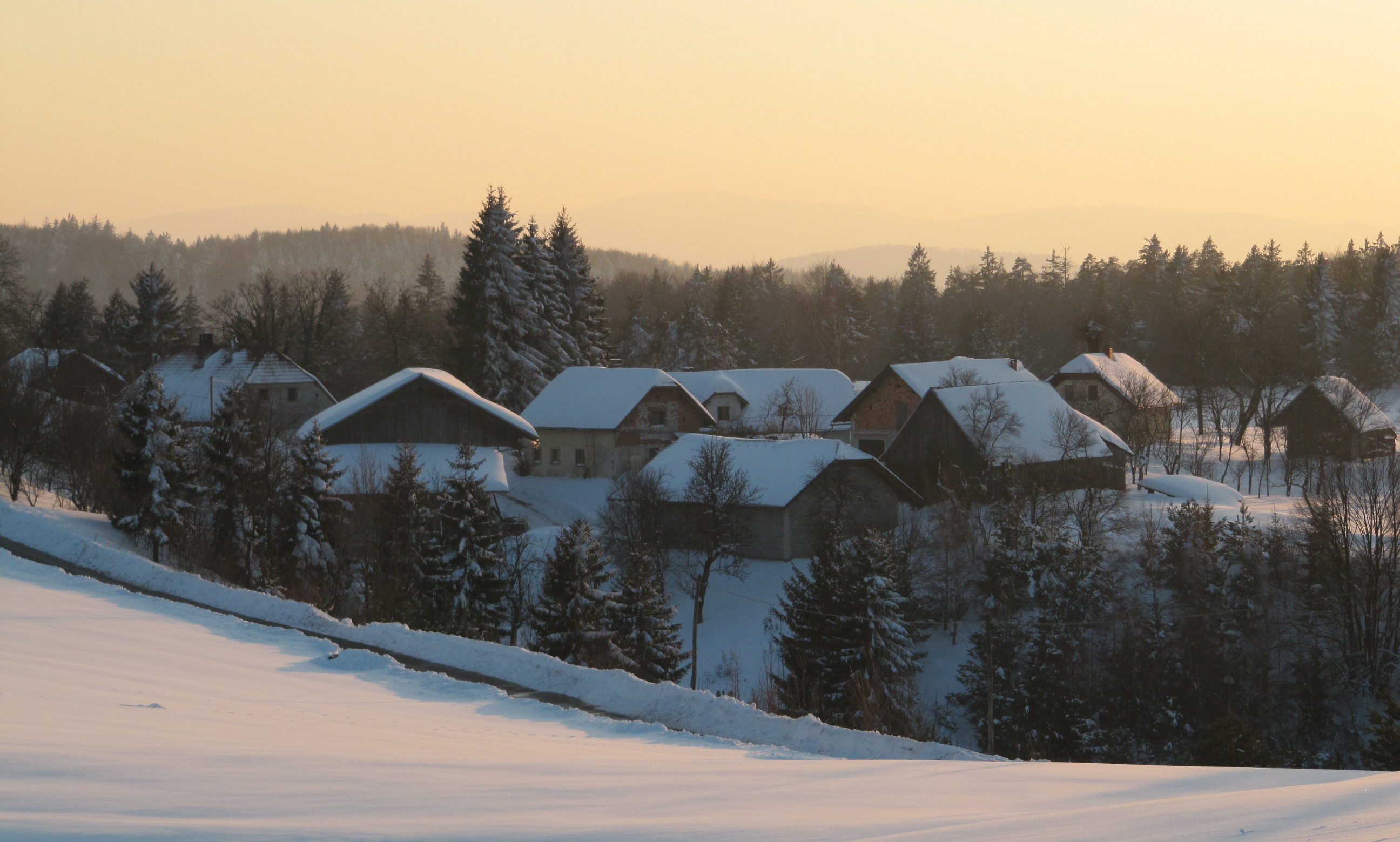

- Location in Slovenia
- Coordinates: 45°49′12.02″N 14°33′33.2″E
- Country: Slovenia
- Traditional region: Lower Carniola
- Statistical region: Central Slovenia
- Municipality: Velike Lašče

Area
  - Total: 2.26 km^{2} (0.87 sq mi)
- Elevation: 794.9 m (2,608 ft)

Population (2002)
  - Total: 9
- Postal code: 1314

Naredi (pronounced [naˈɾeːdi]) is a small settlement on the Rute Plateau (Slovene: Rutarska planota) in the hills west of Velike Lašče in central Slovenia. The entire Municipality of Velike Lašče is part of the traditional region of Lower Carniola. It is now included in the Central Slovenia Statistical Region.
