= Selo pri Robu =

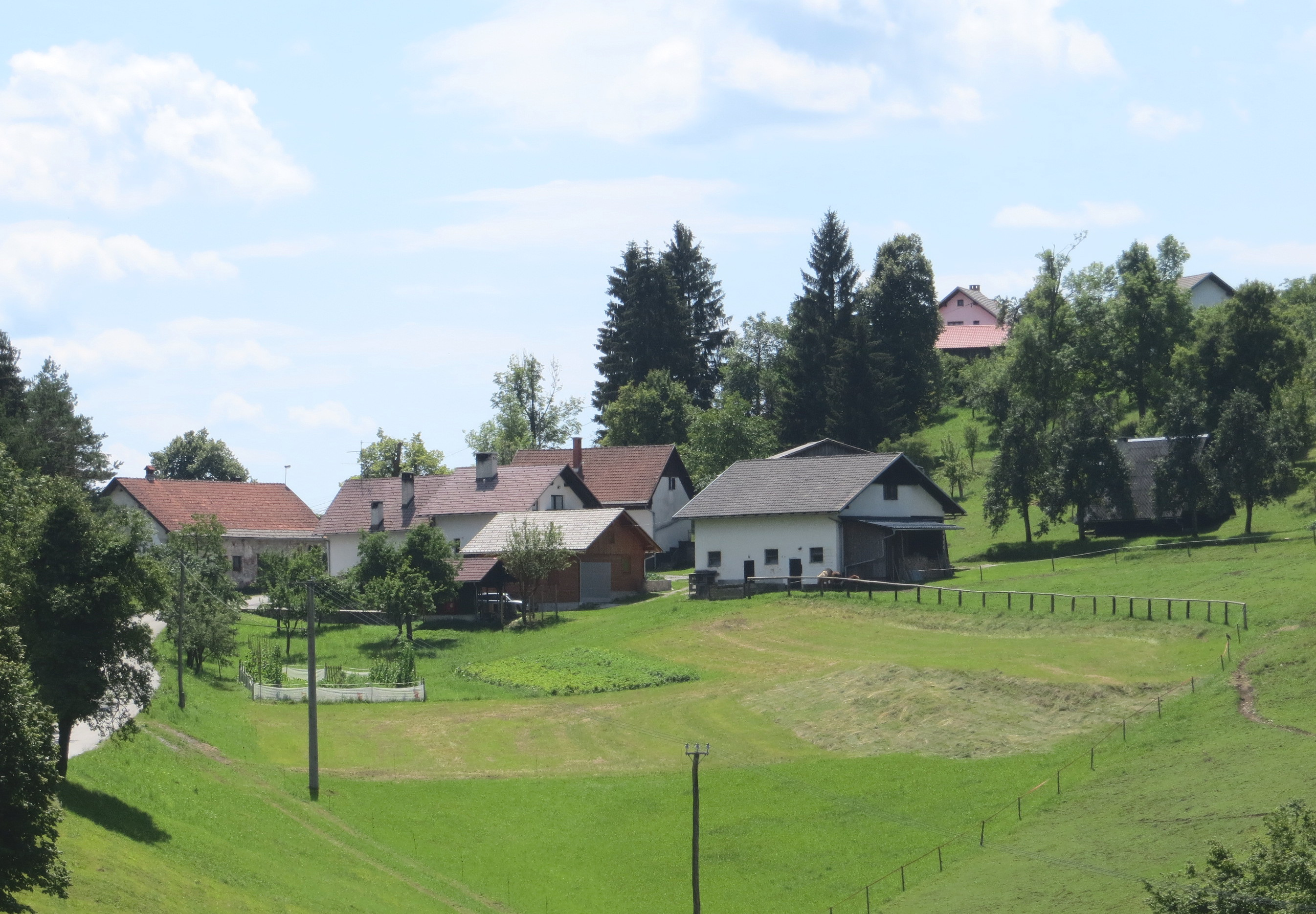

- Location in Slovenia
- Coordinates: 45°49′49.63″N 14°32′20.15″E
- Country: Slovenia
- Traditional region: Lower Carniola
- Statistical region: Central Slovenia
- Municipality: Velike Lašče

Area
  - Total: 4.99 km^{2} (1.93 sq mi)
- Elevation: 819 m (2,687 ft)

Population (2002)
  - Total: 41
- Postal code: 1314

Selo pri Robu (pronounced [ˈsɛːlɔ pɾi ˈɾoːbu]) is a settlement on the Rute Plateau (Slovene: Rutarska planota) in the hills southwest of Rob in the Municipality of Velike Lašče in central Slovenia. The municipality is part of the traditional region of Lower Carniola and is now included in the Central Slovenia Statistical Region.

== Name ==
The name of the settlement was changed from Selo to Selo pri Robu in 1953.

== History ==
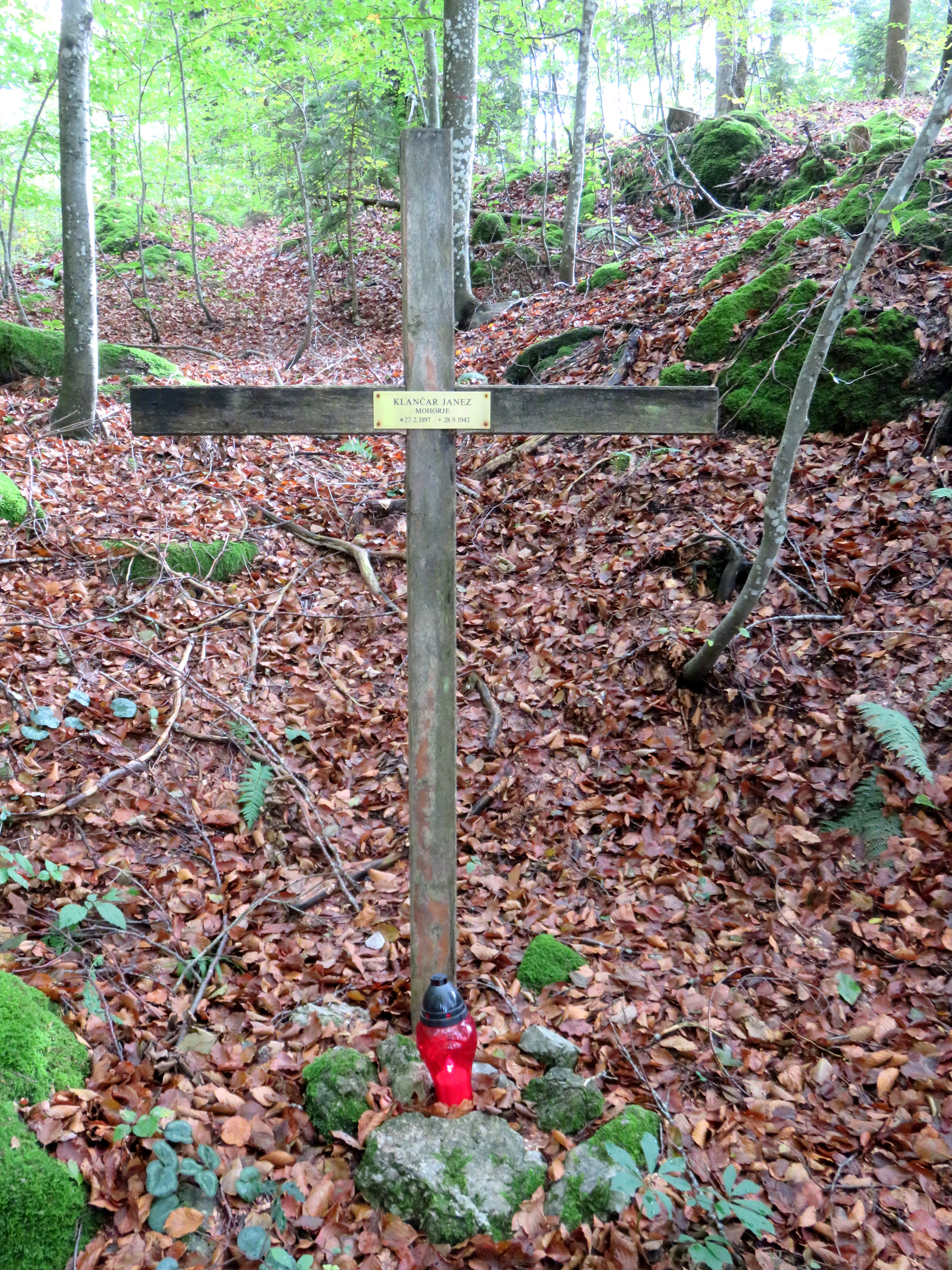
The Janez Klančar Grave

The area of Selo pri Robu was already settled in antiquity. A Roman road connecting Emona and the Lož Valley (Slovene: Loška dolina) ran past the village. In late antiquity it was protected by a 328 m defensive wall with towers. The village was heavily affected by the Second World War. On 24 July 1942, Italian forces burned the mill and sawmill on Iška Creek in the hamlet of Predgozd, and two days later, three villagers were shot at Big Peak (Veliki Vrh, 812 m) on the Bloke Plateau south of the village. The Krašovec family was murdered by Italian forces on 12 September that year. In 1943, three houses in the village were burned on 31 January, and additional houses on 4 August.

Selo pri Robu is the site of a grave from the Second World War inventoried by the Commission on Concealed Mass Graves in Slovenia. The Janez Klančar Grave (Slovene: grob Janeza Klančarja) is located in the woods northwest of the village, next to the Romani Mass Grave in neighboring Bukovec, and is marked with a cross. Klančar was a farmer from Mohorje and was abducted from his home by the Slovene Partisans on September 27, 1942.

== Cultural heritage ==
There is a small 18th-century chapel-shrine at the crossroads at the centre of the settlement.
