= Velika Slevica =

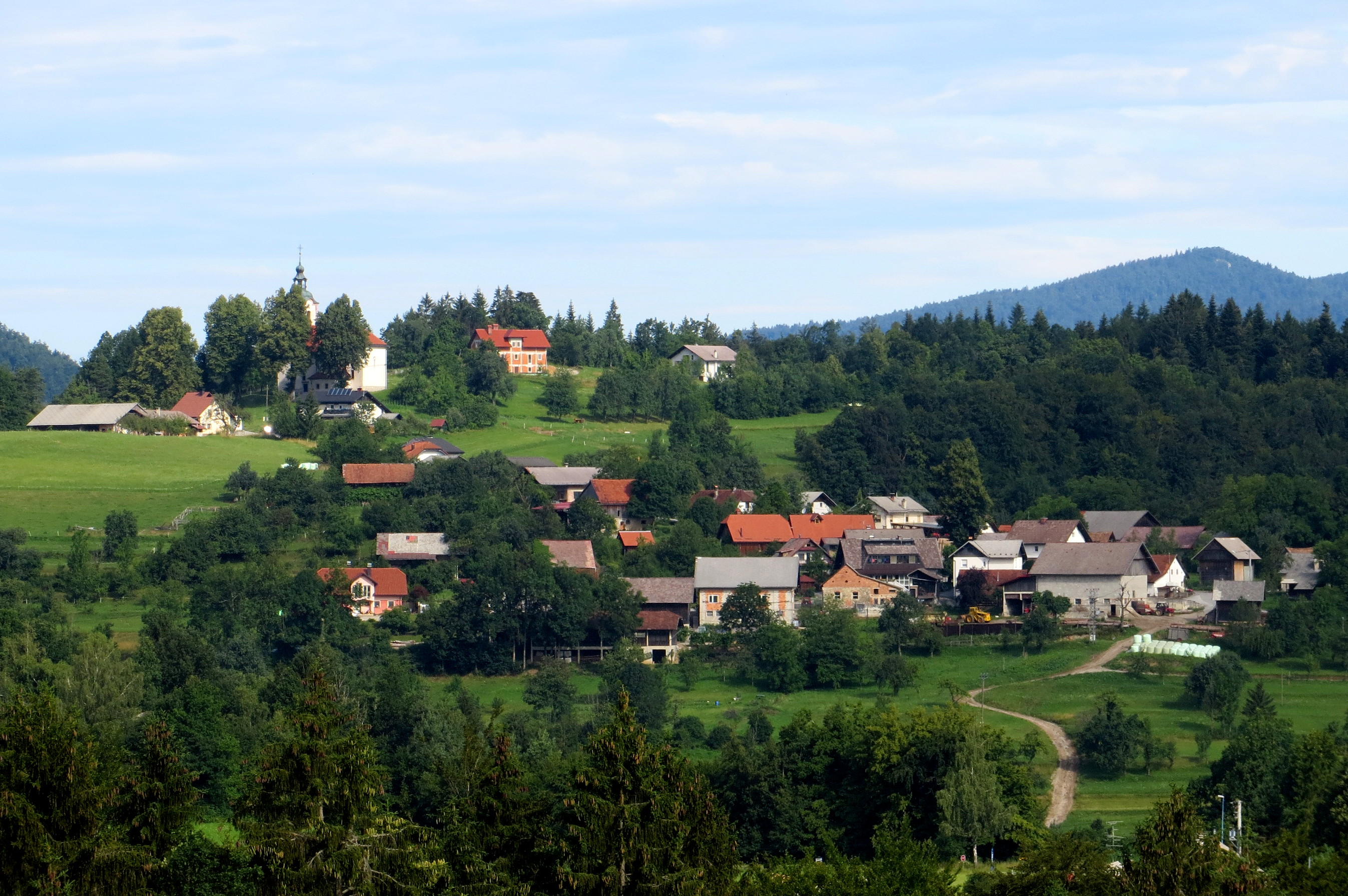

- Location in Slovenia
- Coordinates: 45°49′4.37″N 14°37′9.61″E
- Country: Slovenia
- Traditional region: Lower Carniola
- Statistical region: Central Slovenia
- Municipality: Velike Lašče

Area
  - Total: 1.14 km^{2} (0.44 sq mi)
- Elevation: 610.9 m (2,004 ft)

Population (2002)
  - Total: 60
- Postal code: 1315

Velika Slevica (pronounced [ˈʋeːlika ˈsleːʋitsa]; in older sources also Velika Slivica, German: Großsliwitz) is a village southwest of Velike Lašče in central Slovenia. The entire Municipality of Velike Lašče is part of the traditional region of Lower Carniola and is now included in the Central Slovenia Statistical Region.

== Name ==
Velika Slevica was attested in historical sources as Zilowiz in 1230, Syloycz in 1335, Silewecz in 1346, and Czylowecz in 1436, among other spellings.

== Church ==
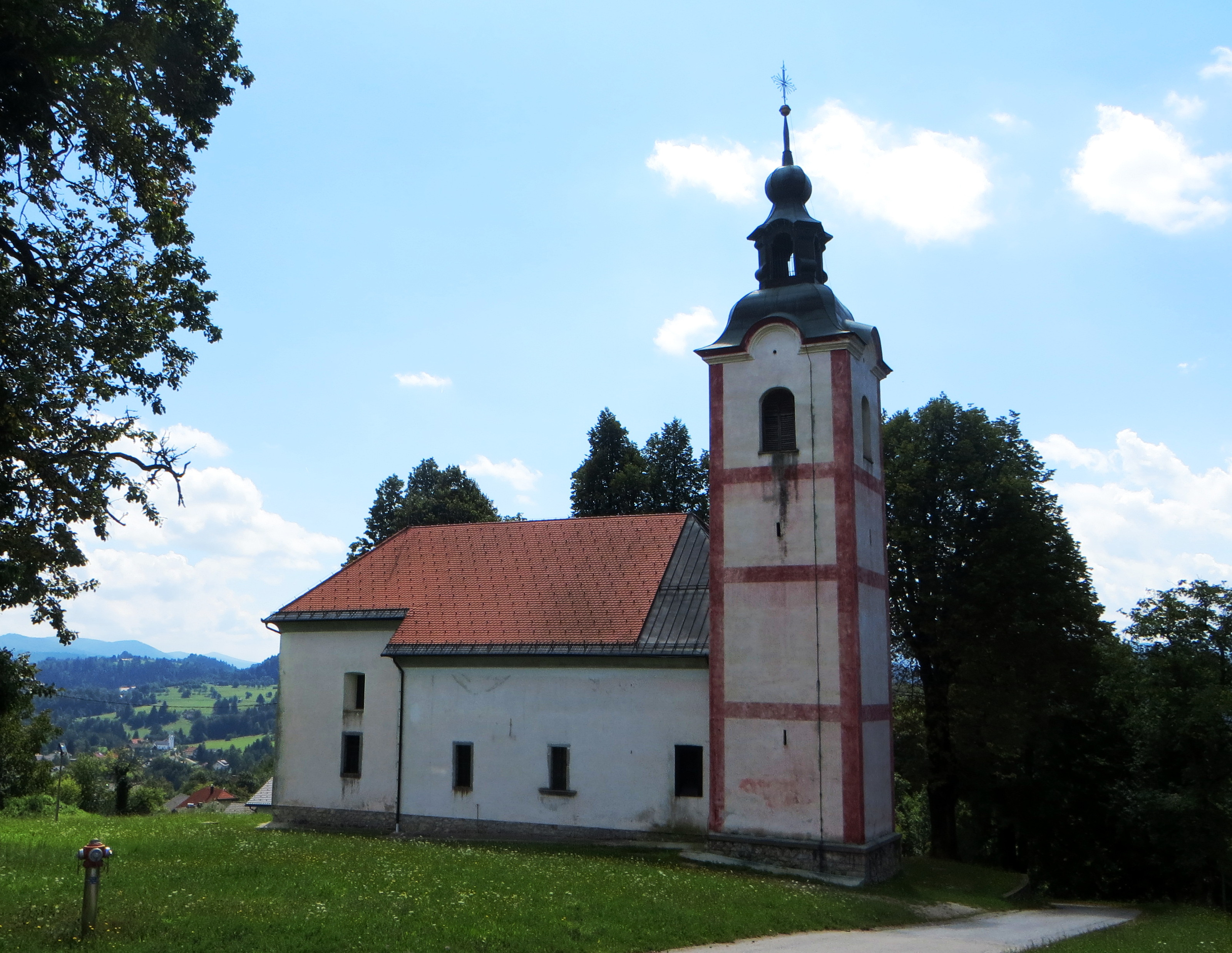
Annunciation Church

The local church, built on a grassy slope above the village to the northwest, is dedicated to the Annunciation of Mary and belongs to the Parish of Velike Lašče. It was built in the last quarter of the 17th century.
