= Vrh, Velike Lašče =

Vrh
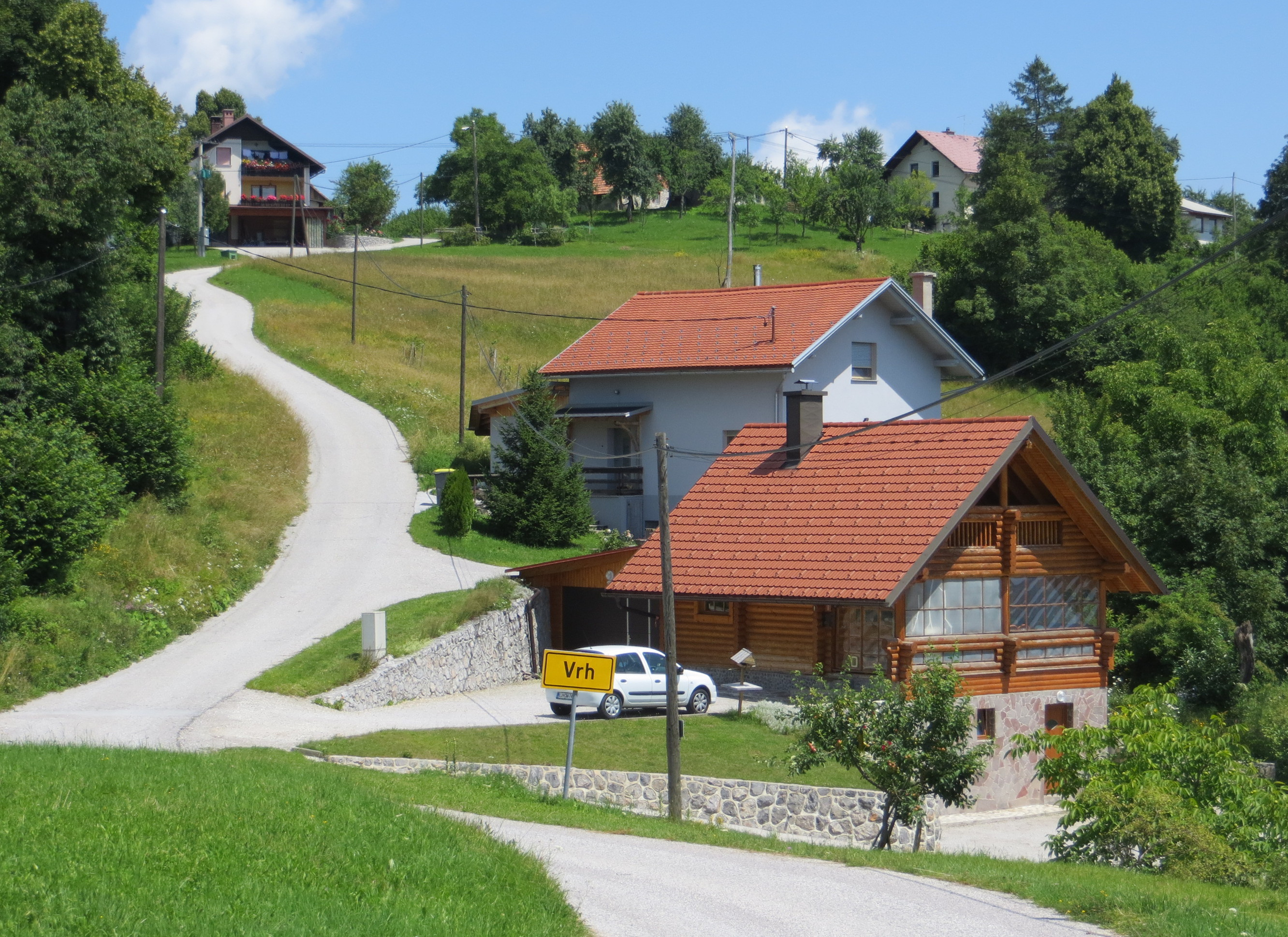

- Location in Slovenia
- Coordinates: 45°49′31.25″N 14°32′39.76″E
- Country: Slovenia
- Traditional region: Lower Carniola
- Statistical region: Central Slovenia
- Municipality: Velike Lašče

Area
  - Total: 0.52 km^{2} (0.20 sq mi)
- Elevation: 810.1 m (2,658 ft)

Population (2002)
  - Total: 16
- Postal code: 1314

Vrh (pronounced [ˈʋəɾx]) is a small remote settlement on the Rute Plateau (Slovene: Rutarska planota) in the hills south of Rob in central Slovenia. The entire Municipality of Velike Lašče is part of the traditional region of Lower Carniola and is now included in the Central Slovenia Statistical Region.
