= Bane, Velike Lašče =

Bane
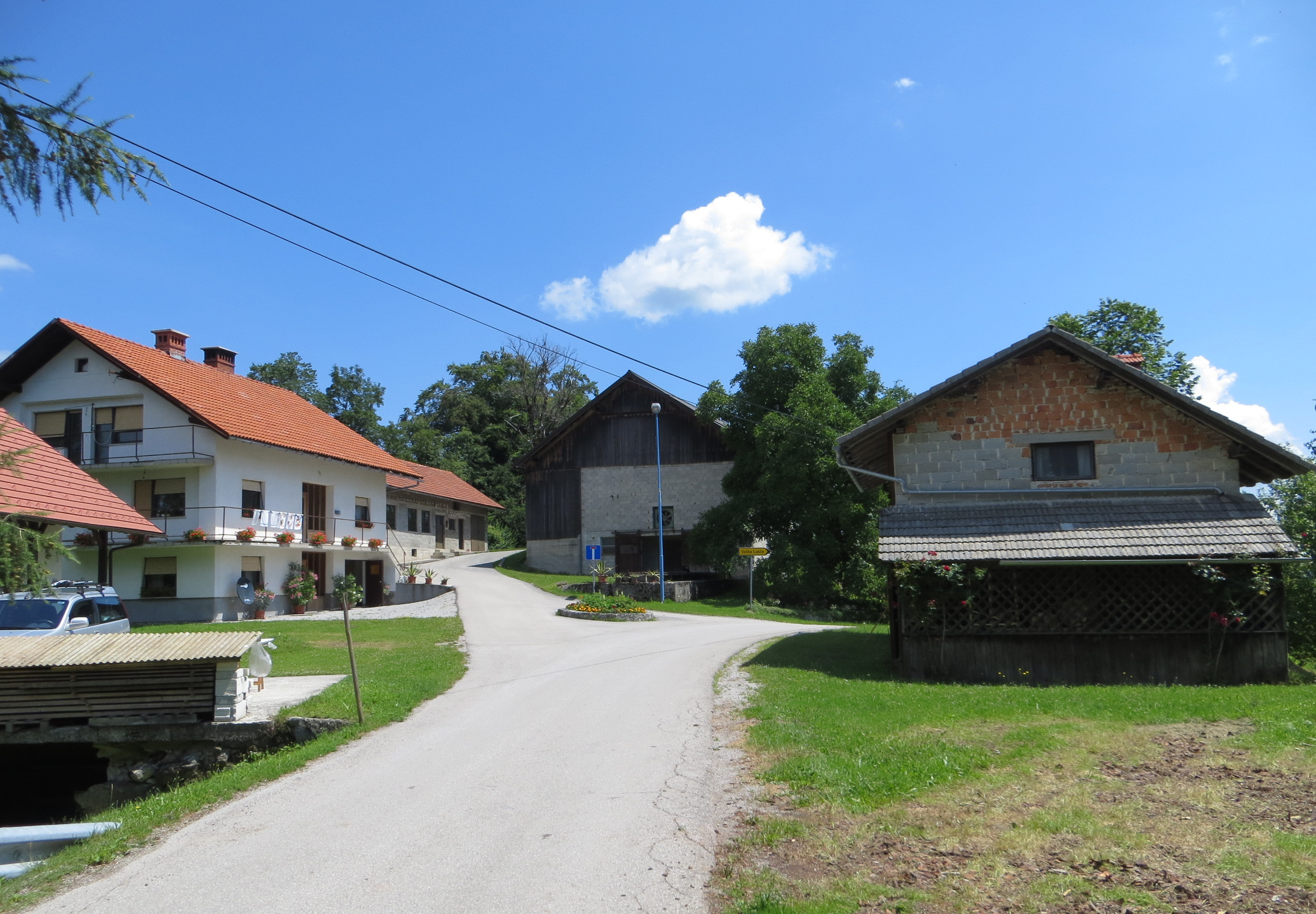

- Location in Slovenia
- Coordinates: 45°49′24.39″N 14°33′49.32″E
- Country: Slovenia
- Traditional region: Lower Carniola
- Statistical region: Central Slovenia
- Municipality: Velike Lašče

Area
  - Total: 0.66 km^{2} (0.25 sq mi)
- Elevation: 806.9 m (2,647 ft)

Population (2015)
  - Total: 1
- Postal code: 1314

Bane (pronounced [ˈbaːnɛ]) is a small remote settlement on the Rute Plateau (Slovene: Rutarska planota) in the hills west of Velike Lašče in Slovenia. The entire Municipality of Velike Lašče is part of the traditional region of Lower Carniola and is now included in the Central Slovenia Statistical Region.

== Name ==
Bane was attested in historical sources as Wan in 1425 and Wann in 1431.
