= Logaršče =

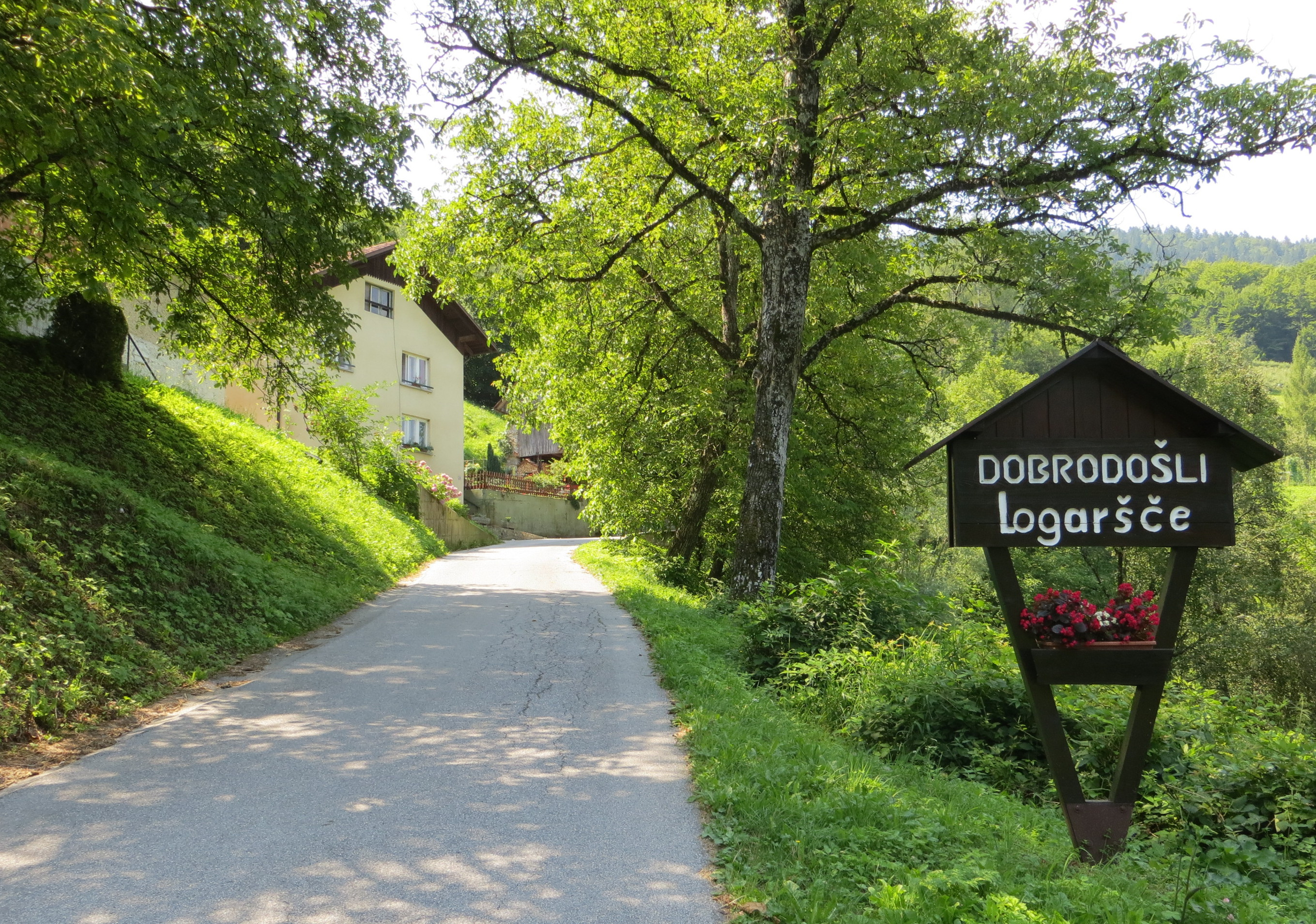

- Location in Slovenia
- Coordinates: 46°9′8.58″N 13°45′11.99″E
- Country: Slovenia
- Traditional region: Slovenian Littoral
- Statistical region: Gorizia
- Municipality: Tolmin

Area
  - Total: 5.46 km^{2} (2.11 sq mi)
- Elevation: 584.3 m (1,917 ft)

Population (2002)
  - Total: 68

Logaršče (pronounced [ˈloːɡaɾʃtʃɛ]; in older sources also Logaršče Rakovec) is a dispersed settlement in the hills south of the Bača Valley in the Municipality of Tolmin in the Littoral region of Slovenia.

== Name ==
Logaršče was attested in historical sources as Logaisca in 1351, Lagossca in 1377, and Logoschia in 1419, among other spellings. The name Logaršče is either a syncopation of *Logarišče, a collective noun derived from logar 'forest owner', referring to the local environment and related to place names such as Logarji and Logarše (a hamlet of Praprotno Brdo), or is derived from *Logišče with an epenthetic r.

== Church ==
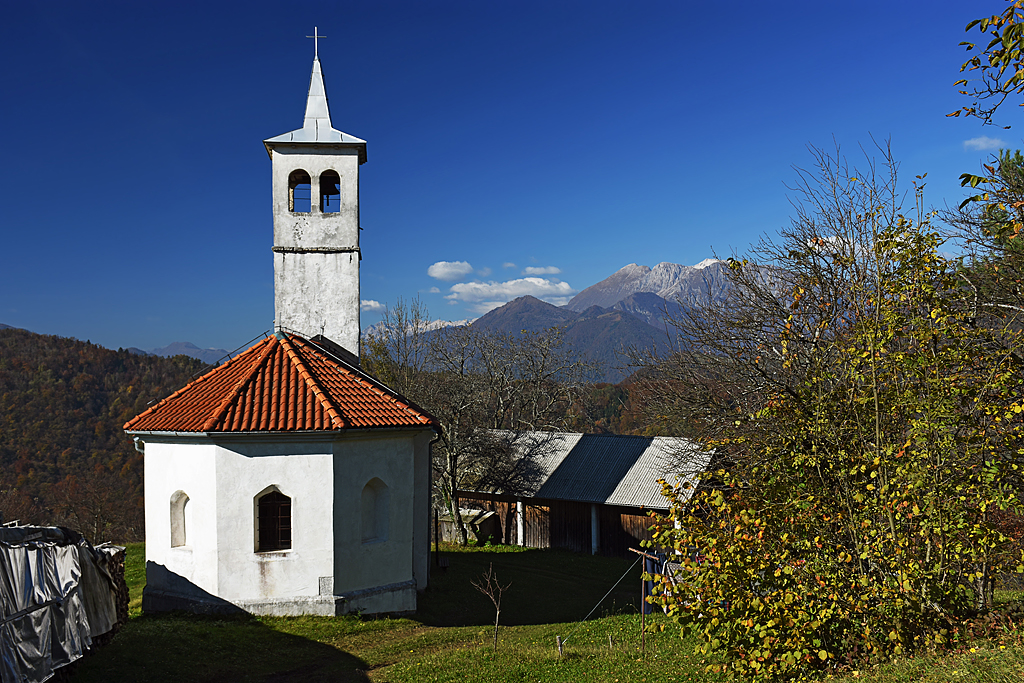
Saint Lucy's Church

The local church is dedicated to Saint Lucy and belongs to the Parish of Podmelec.
