= Brankovo =

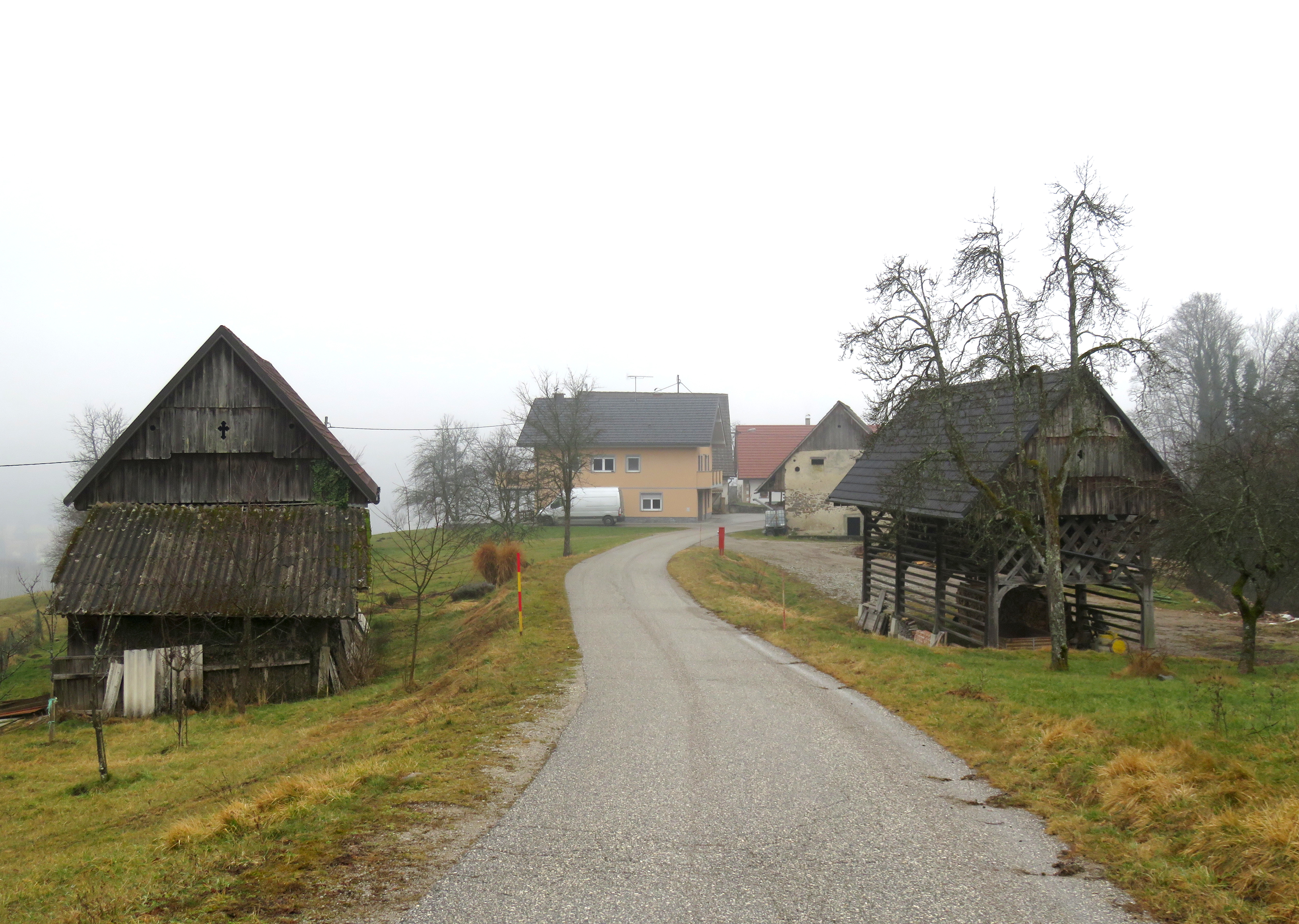

- Location in Slovenia
- Coordinates: 45°49′49.49″N 14°36′1.18″E
- Country: Slovenia
- Traditional region: Lower Carniola
- Statistical region: Central Slovenia
- Municipality: Velike Lašče

Area
  - Total: 0.61 km^{2} (0.24 sq mi)
- Elevation: 528.4 m (1,734 ft)

Population (2002)
  - Total: 20
- Postal code: 1315

Brankovo (pronounced [ˈbraːŋkɔʋɔ]; German: Brankou) is a small settlement on the edge of the valley known as Mišja dolina (literally, 'Monks' valley'), 3 kilometers (1.9 mi) west of Velike Lašče in central Slovenia. The area is part of the traditional region of Lower Carniola and is now included in the Central Slovenia Statistical Region.

== Name ==
Brankovo was attested in written sources as Frankchen in 1436 and Frankowicz in 1465. The name Brankovo is derived from an estate name, referring to an isolated farm known as Branko that the village developed from.
