= Snegulka Detoni =

Slovene physicist (1921–2016)

- Born: 22 May 1921; Begunje pri Cerknici
- Died: 14 January 2016 (aged 94)
- Other names: Snegulka De Toni, Snegulka Detoni Moljk, Sneguljka Detoni
- Spouse: Anton Moljk
- Awards: Boris Kidrič Prize
- Scientific career
- Fields: Physics Chemistry

Snegulka Detoni (de Toni) (22 May 1921 – 14 January 2016) was a prominent Slovene physicist and chemist known for her research in hydrogen bonding. She was the recipient of the Boris Kidrič Prize in 1961.

Detoni was the first female researcher in the University of Ljubljana's physics department.

== Awards and honours ==
Detoni was awarded the Boris Kidrič Prize in 1961 along with Robert Blinc for her work in hydrogen bonding research.
