= Zgonče =

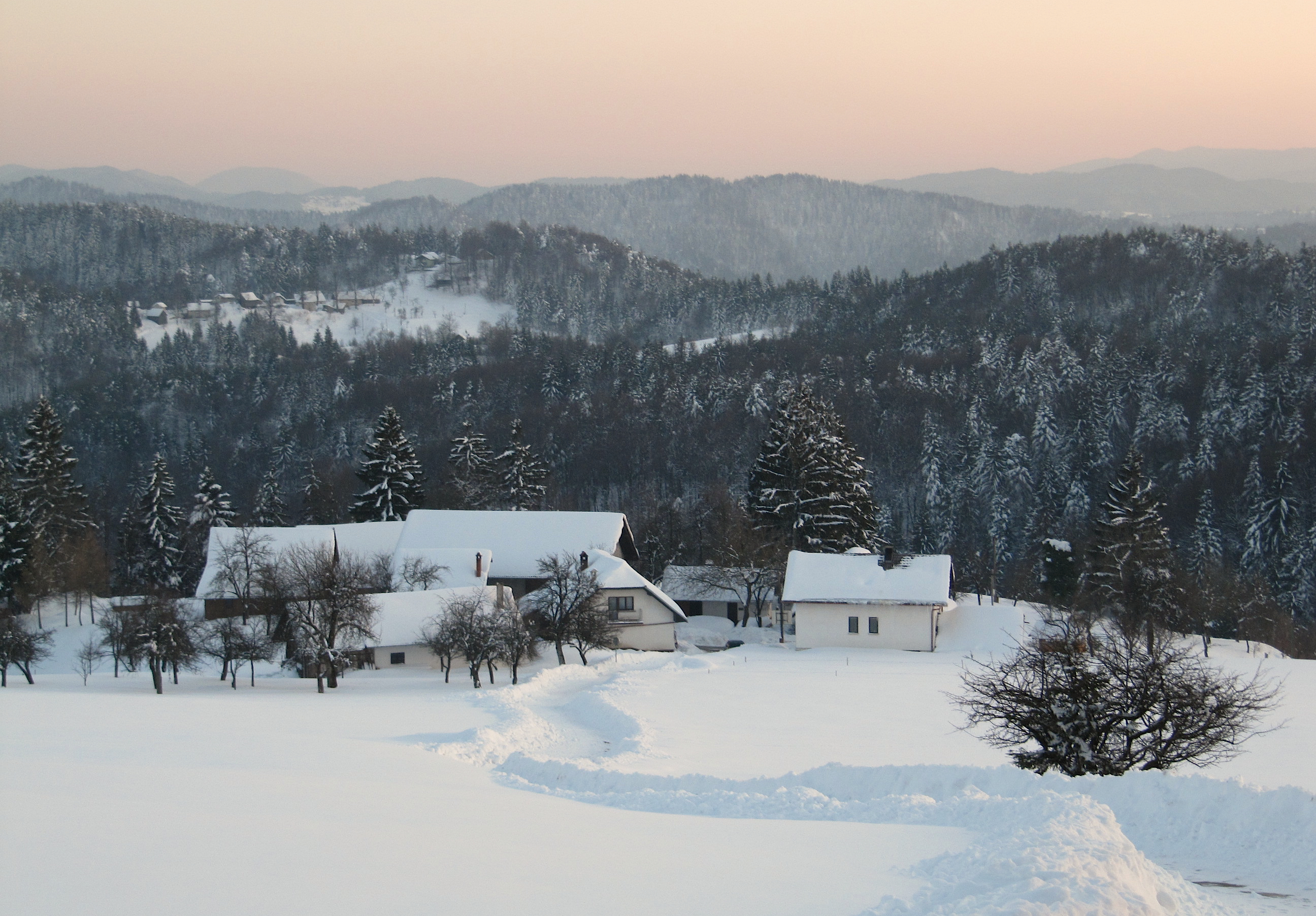

- Location in Slovenia
- Coordinates: 45°49′44.62″N 14°34′28.55″E
- Country: Slovenia
- Traditional region: Lower Carniola
- Statistical region: Central Slovenia
- Municipality: Velike Lašče

Area
  - Total: 1.45 km^{2} (0.56 sq mi)
- Elevation: 759.1 m (2,490 ft)

Population (2002)
  - Total: 8
- Postal code: 1314

Zgonče (pronounced [ˈzɡoːntʃɛ]) is a small settlement on the Rute Plateau (Slovene: Rutarska planota) in the hills south of Rob in the Municipality of Velike Lašče in central Slovenia. The entire municipality is part of the traditional region of Lower Carniola and is now included in the Central Slovenia Statistical Region.

== Church ==
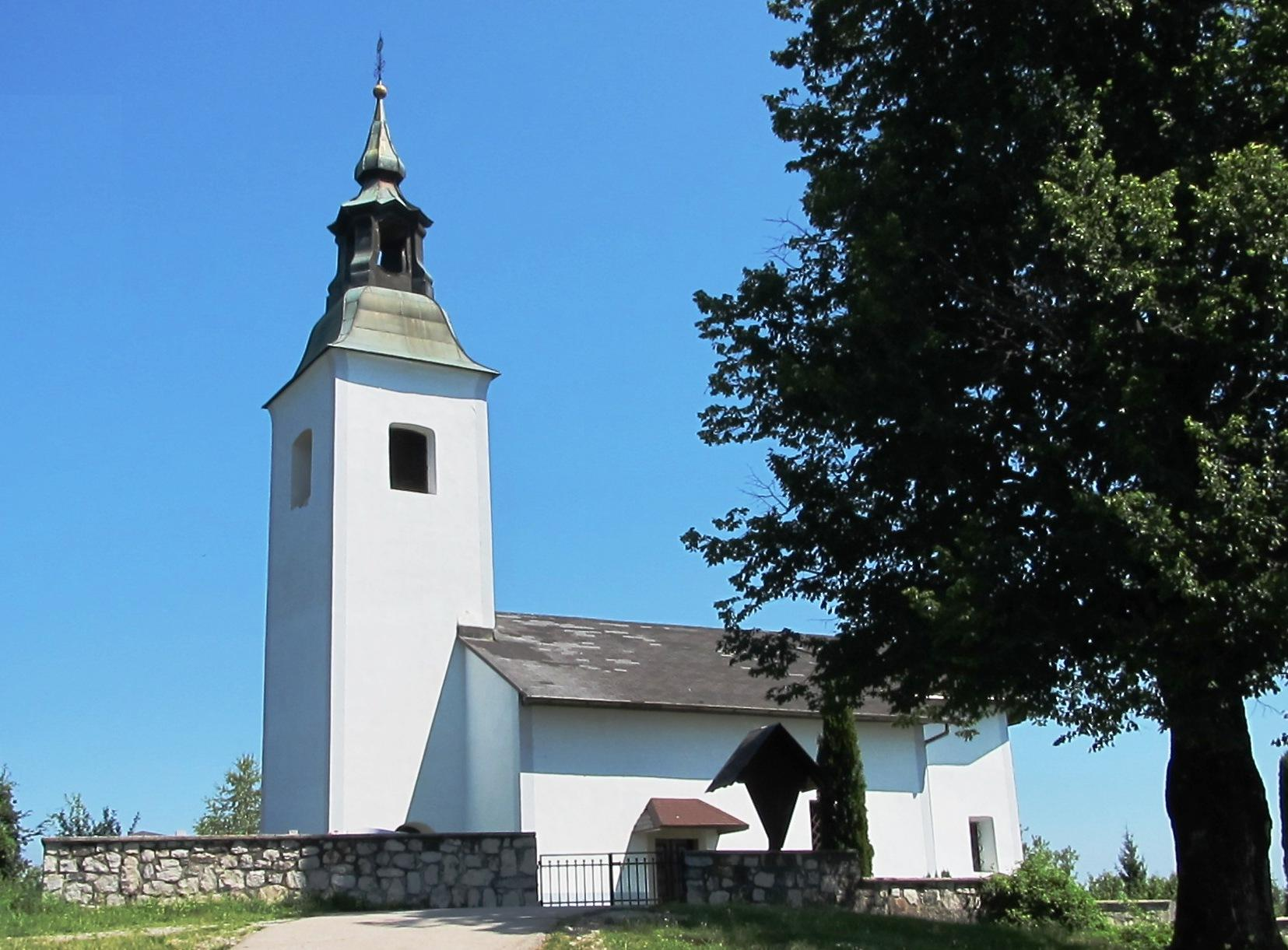
Saints Primus and Felician Church

The local church, built north of the settlement, is dedicated to Saints Primus and Felician and belongs to the Parish of Rob. It is a 14th-century building that was remodeled during the Baroque, but the whole interior of the sanctuary is covered in frescos dating to the second half of the 15th century.
