= Male Lašče =

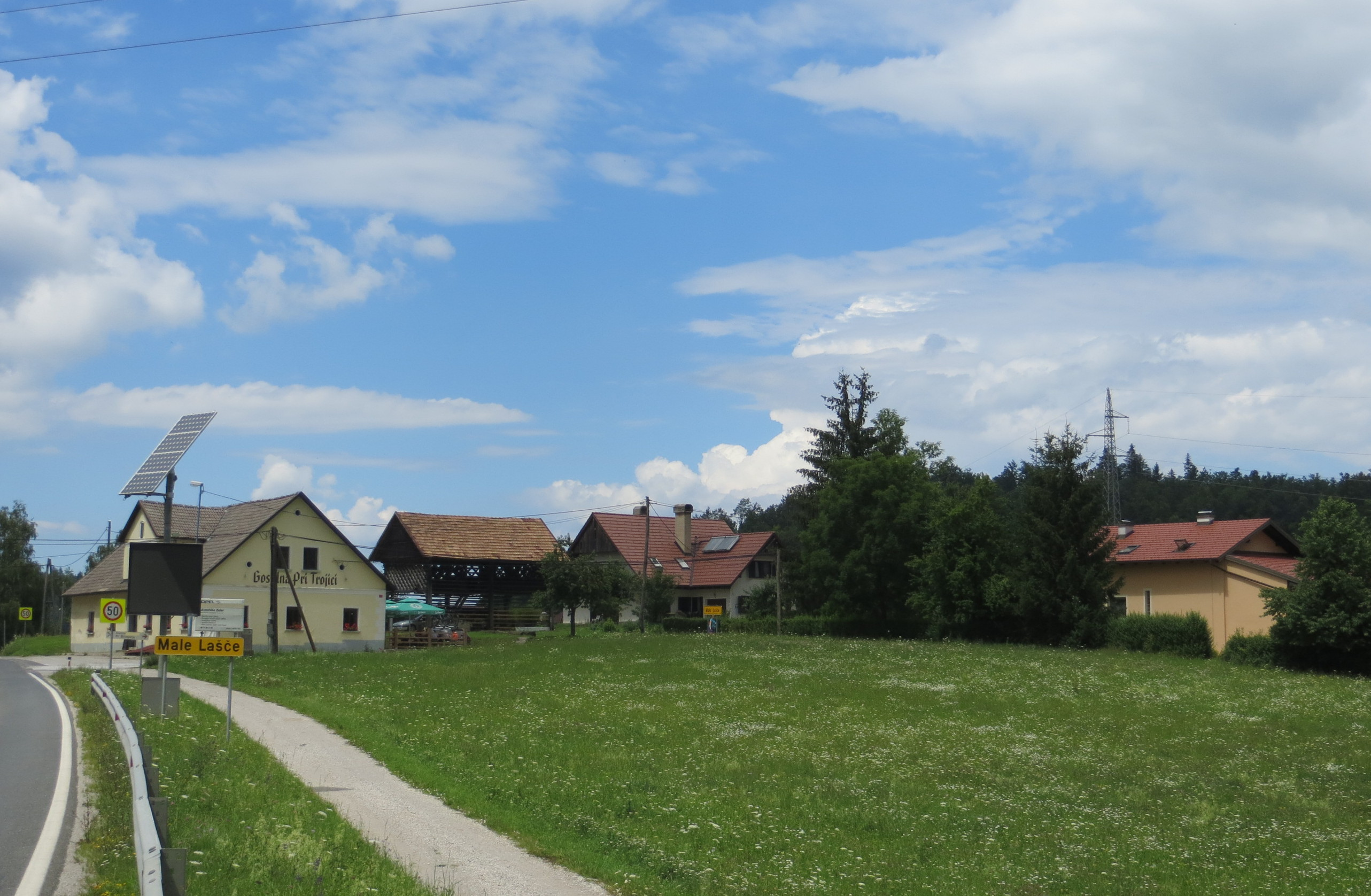

- Location in Slovenia
- Coordinates: 45°50′44.3″N 14°37′59.45″E
- Country: Slovenia
- Traditional region: Lower Carniola
- Statistical region: Central Slovenia
- Municipality: Velike Lašče

Area
  - Total: 1.26 km^{2} (0.49 sq mi)
- Elevation: 521 m (1,709 ft)

Population (2002)
  - Total: 258
- Postal code: 1385

Male Lašče (pronounced [ˈmaːlɛ ˈlaːʃtʃɛ]; German: Kleinlaschitz) is a village immediately north of Velike Lašče in central Slovenia. The Municipality of Velike Lašče is part of the traditional region of Lower Carniola and is now included in the Central Slovenia Statistical Region.

== Name ==
The name Male Lašče literally means 'little Lašče', distinguishing the town from the neighboring town of Velike Lašče (literally, 'big Lašče'). The name of the settlements was first attested in written sources in 1145 as Lasis (and as Lasissa in 1251, and Lasitsch in 1256). The medieval attestations indicate that the name was originally *Lašiče, an accusative plural form of the patronymic Lašič, derived from the name Lah—thus meaning 'the place where Lah's people live'. The name Lah is derived from Vlah and originally referred to the Romanized Celtic population, and later to Romance speakers, including Italians and Uskoks. In the past the German name was Kleinlaschitz.

== Church ==
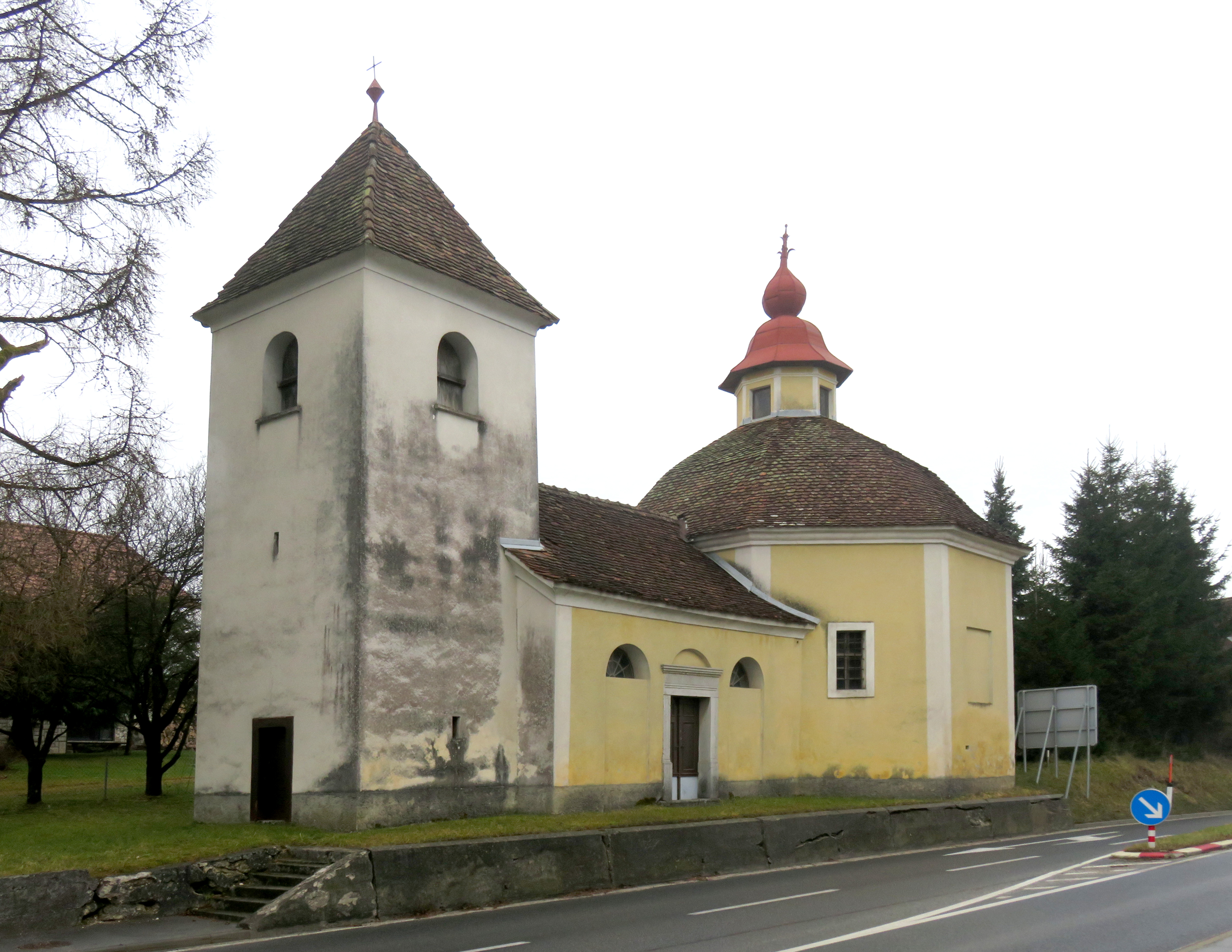
Holy Trinity Church

The local church, built in the southern part of the settlement next to the main road from Rašica to Velike Lašče, is dedicated to the Holy Trinity and belongs to the Parish of Velike Lašče. It was built in 1728 and contains frescos dating to 1735.
