= Dednik =

- Location in Slovenia
- Coordinates: 45°49′51.42″N 14°33′2.31″E
- Country: Slovenia
- Traditional region: Lower Carniola
- Statistical region: Central Slovenia
- Municipality: Velike Lašče

Area
  - Total: 2.44 km^{2} (0.94 sq mi)
- Elevation: 788.3 m (2,586 ft)

Population (2002)
  - Total: 21
- Postal code: 1314

Dednik (pronounced [ˈdeːdnik]) is a small settlement below Dednik Hill on the Rute Plateau (Slovene: Rutarska planota) in the hills west of Velike Lašče in central Slovenia. The area is part of the traditional region of Lower Carniola and is now included in the Central Slovenia Statistical Region.
