= Rute Plateau =

Plateau in Slovenia

- Plateau
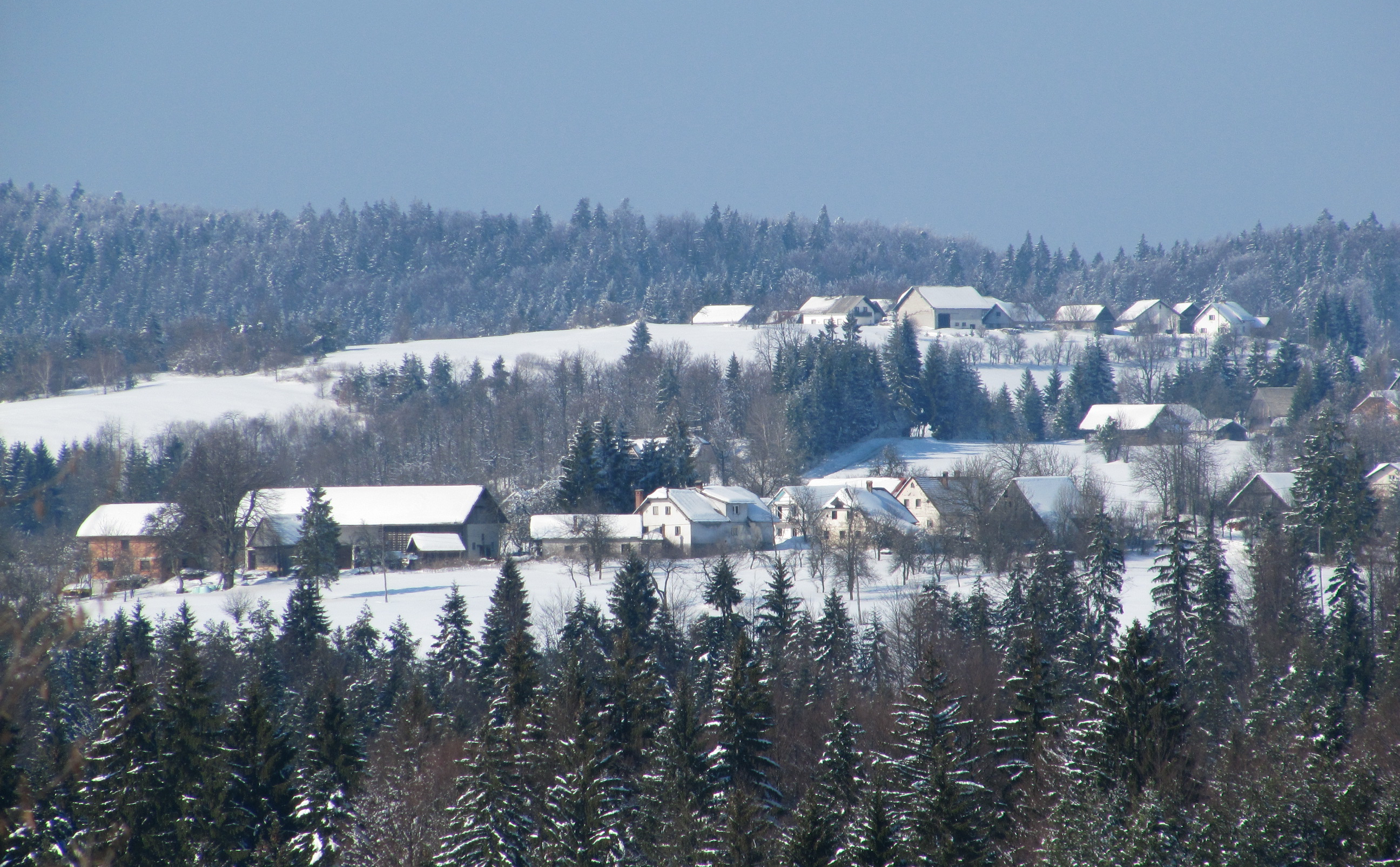
- The Rute Plateau with Boštetje (foreground) and Mohorje (background)
- Interactive map of Rute Plateau
- Location: Lower Carniola
- Highest elevation: 834 m (2,736 ft) (Dednik Hill)

The Rute Plateau (Slovene pronunciation: [ˈɾuːtɛ]; Slovene: Rutarska planota, also simply Rute) is a karst limestone plateau in Lower Carniola, Slovenia with an area of about 9 square kilometers (3.5 sq mi).

The forested ridges on the plateau run in a northwest–southeast direction (known as the Dinaric direction). To the east, the plateau descends into the Mišja Valley (Slovene: Mišja dolina), to the west it descends into the Iška Gorge, and to the north it borders the Mačkovec Plateau.

The plateau has nine villages: Bane, Boštetje, Dednik, Mohorje, Naredi, Rupe, Selo pri Robu (with the hamlet of Predgozd), Vrh, and Zgonče. The villages date back to the Middle Ages, when settlements were created in new clearings in the forest, and forestry remains a principle economic activity in the area.

The area was occupied by the Romans in antiquity, and several sections of Roman defense walls are preserved on the plateau. The longest section, measuring 1,548 meters (5,079 ft), ends above the village of Rob.
