= Bukovje, Postojna =

Bukovje
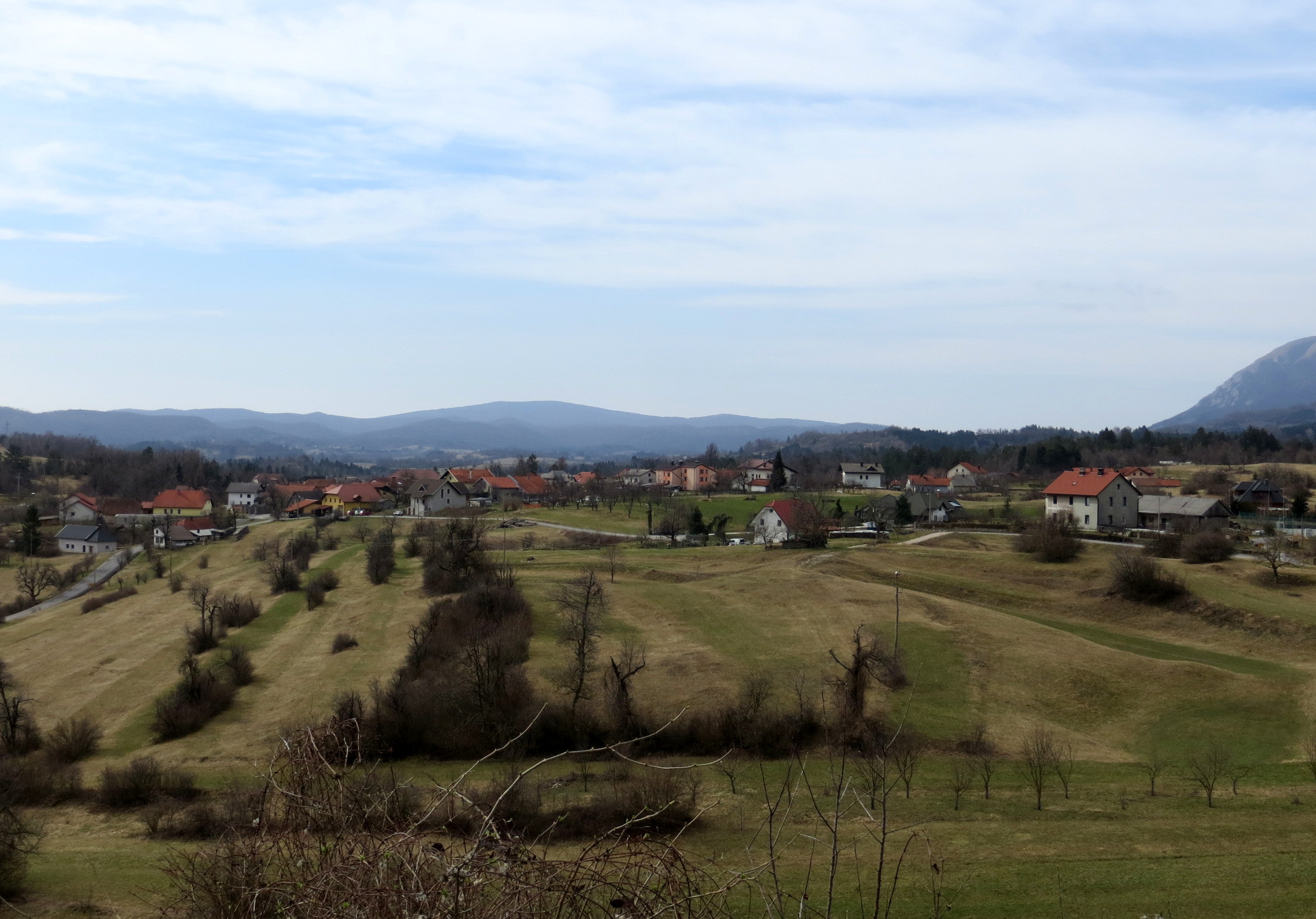

- Location in Slovenia
- Coordinates: 45°49′33.79″N 14°7′9.66″E
- Country: Slovenia
- Traditional region: Inner Carniola
- Statistical region: Littoral–Inner Carniola
- Municipality: Postojna

Area
  - Total: 6.77 km^{2} (2.61 sq mi)
- Elevation: 649.8 m (2,132 ft)

Population (2002)
  - Total: 151

Bukovje (pronounced [ˈbuːkɔu̯jɛ]; German: Bukuje) is a village northwest of Postojna in the Inner Carniola region of Slovenia.

== Name ==
The name Bukovje and other names like it (e.g., Bukovica, Bukovec) are derived from the Slovene adjective bukov, from the common noun bukev 'beech'. They refer to the local vegetation. The settlement was known as Bukuje in German in the past.

== History ==
During the Second World War, the Partisans had facilities for preparing and storing food in Bukovje. A Partisan lookout station was located on Čelo Hill near the settlement, and a relay station was located in the nearby Žnidar Shaft (Slovene: Žnidarjevo brezno). In October 1943, German forces burned several houses and outbuildings in the settlement. On 20 October 1944, German and Chetnik forces attacked the Partisan Vladimir Gortan Brigade in Bukovje, with the loss of 25 Partisan soldiers and about 100 Axis soldiers.

=== Mass grave ===
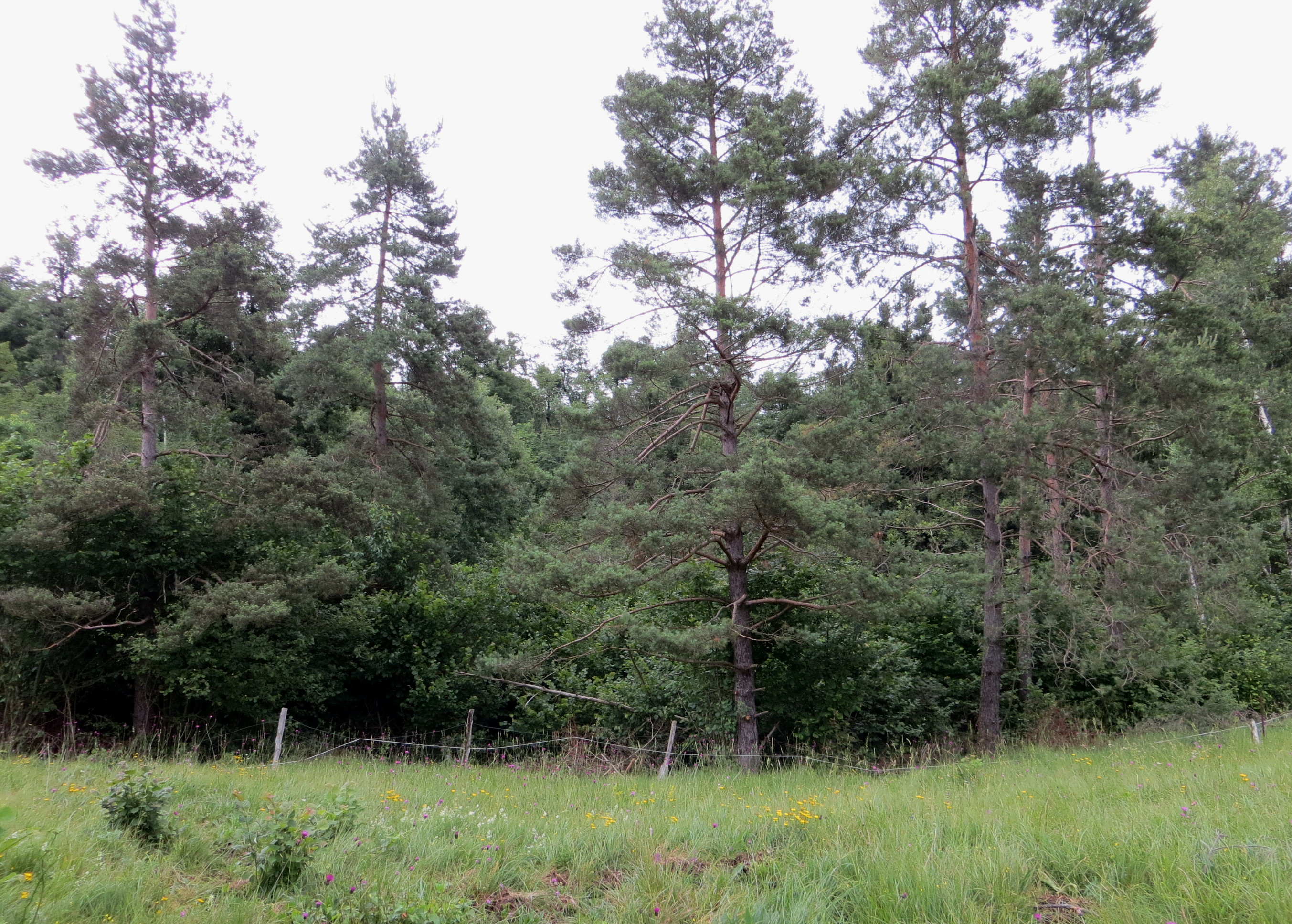
Martinove Hrastnice Shaft Mass Grave

Bukovje is the site of a mass grave from late in the Second World War. The Martinove Hrastnice Shaft Mass Grave (Slovene: Grobišče Brezen v Martinovih Hrastnicah) is located on a hilly slope northwest of the settlement. It contains the remains of at least seven victims, probably German soldiers, killed in January or February 1945.

== Notable people ==
Notable people that were born or lived in Bukovje include:

- Jože Lipovec (1910–?), mountaineer
