= Begunje pri Cerknici =

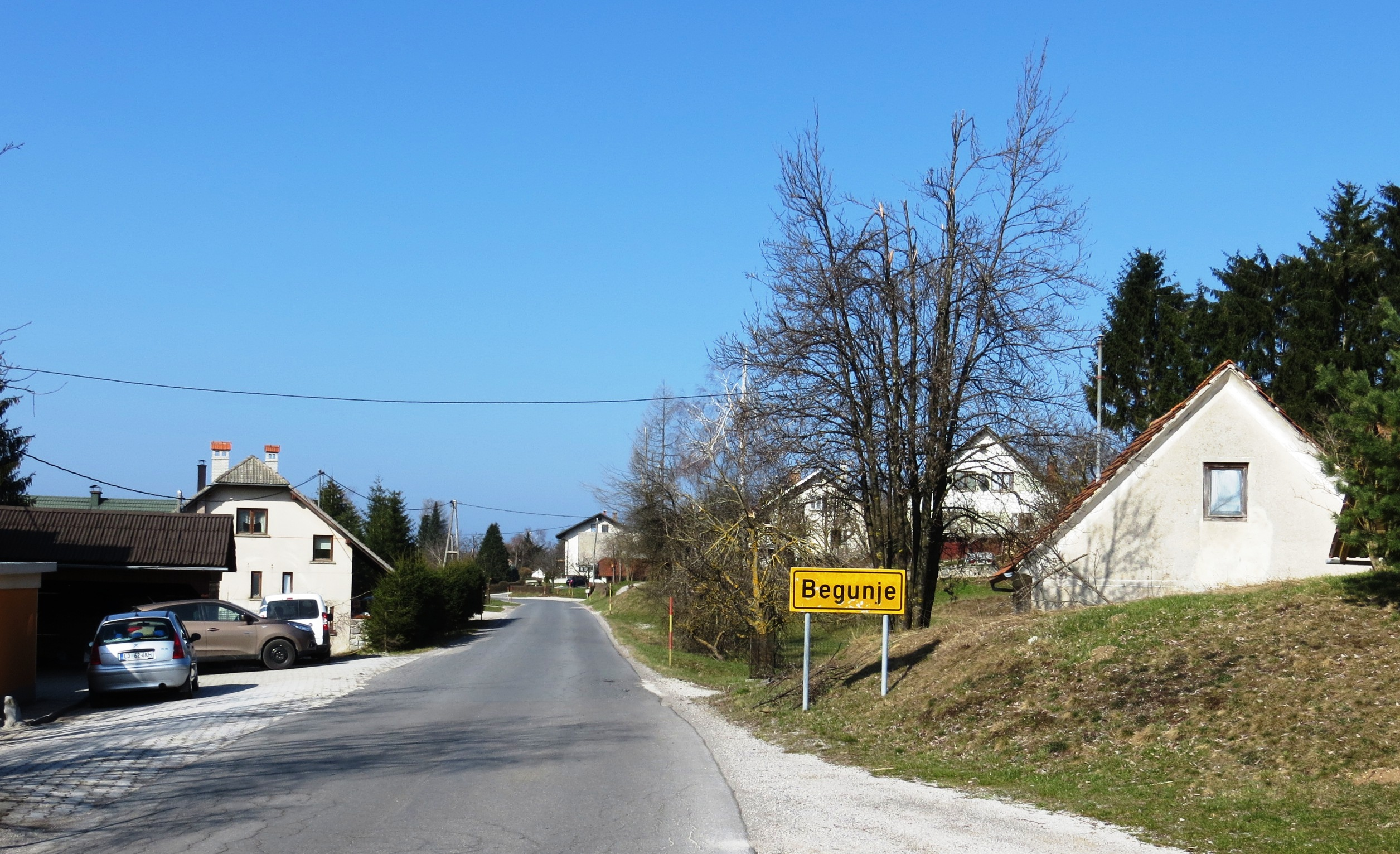

- Location in Slovenia
- Coordinates: 45°48′47.57″N 14°22′31.43″E
- Country: Slovenia
- Traditional region: Inner Carniola
- Statistical region: Littoral–Inner Carniola
- Municipality: Cerknica

Area
  - Total: 8.76 km^{2} (3.38 sq mi)
- Elevation: 605.5 m (1,987 ft)

Population (2020)
  - Total: 716
  - Density: 81.7/km^{2} (212/sq mi)

Begunje pri Cerknici (Slovene pronunciation: [ˈbeːɡunjɛ pɾi ˈtseːɾknitsi]; German: Wigaun) is a settlement north of Cerknica in the Inner Carniola region of Slovenia.

== Name ==
Begunje pri Cerknici was attested in written sources in 1260 as Vegvn (and in 1320 as Vegaun, in 1321 as Vegowen, in 1399 as Vygawn, and in 1498 as Vigawn). In the past the German name of the settlement was Wigaun. The name of the settlement is derived from the personal name *Běgunъ, probably as a clipped version of *Běgun'e (selo) 'Běgunъ's village' (i.e., a neuter singular form) that later shifted to a feminine plural form. In the local dialect the settlement is known as [bai̯ɡne].

== History ==
The settlement was recorded as a property of the Carthusian monastery in Bistra in 1262. Water mains were installed in the village in 1892. A schoolhouse was built in 1906. A fire station was built in 1924, and a community center in 1929. During the Second World War, the schoolhouse was burned down twice, and rebuilt each time. A wood-processing factory was established in 1945, which developed from a communally owned sawmill built just before the war. A distillation plant for essential oils was established in 1955.

== Church ==
The parish church in the settlement is dedicated to Saint Bartholomew and belongs to the Ljubljana Archdiocese. It was first mentioned in written documents dating to 1320, but the current building was erected in the early 20th century with only the belfry, dating to 1823, remaining from the earlier structure. There is also a chapel dedicated to Saint Oswald in the settlement, the remains of the sanctuary of a larger Gothic church that stood on the site. Frescos from the mid-16th century are visible on its exterior. During the Middle Ages, the church was fortified to protect against the danger of Ottoman attacks; the last corner tower of the fortification was razed in 1882. The church as it stands today was erected by the master mason Janez Ronko, Jr., in 1906.

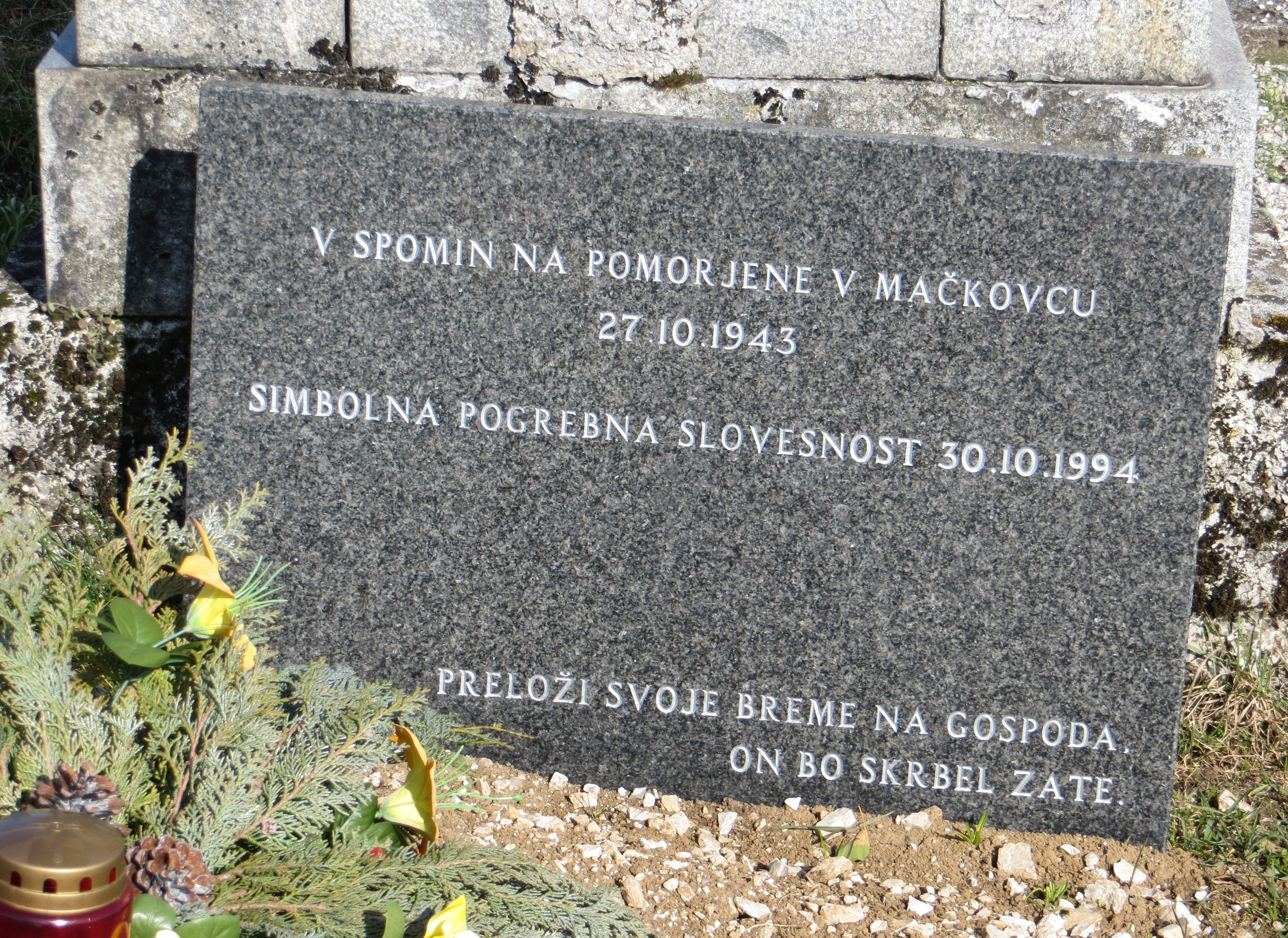
Plaque commemorating the Mačkovec Mass Grave victims

In October 2013, the remains of 40 victims were disinterred from the 1943 Mačkovec Mass Grave in Bukovec and reburied in the church cemetery.

== Notable people ==
Notable people that were born or lived in Begunje pri Cerknici include:

- Josip Debevec (1867–1938), writer, historian, and translator
- Snegulka Detoni (1921–2016), physicist
- Jakob Hren (1830–1924), politician
- Marija Remec (1869–1956), home economics specialist
- Lovro Vidrič (1837–1900), lawyer
