= Bukovica, Ribnica =

Bukovica
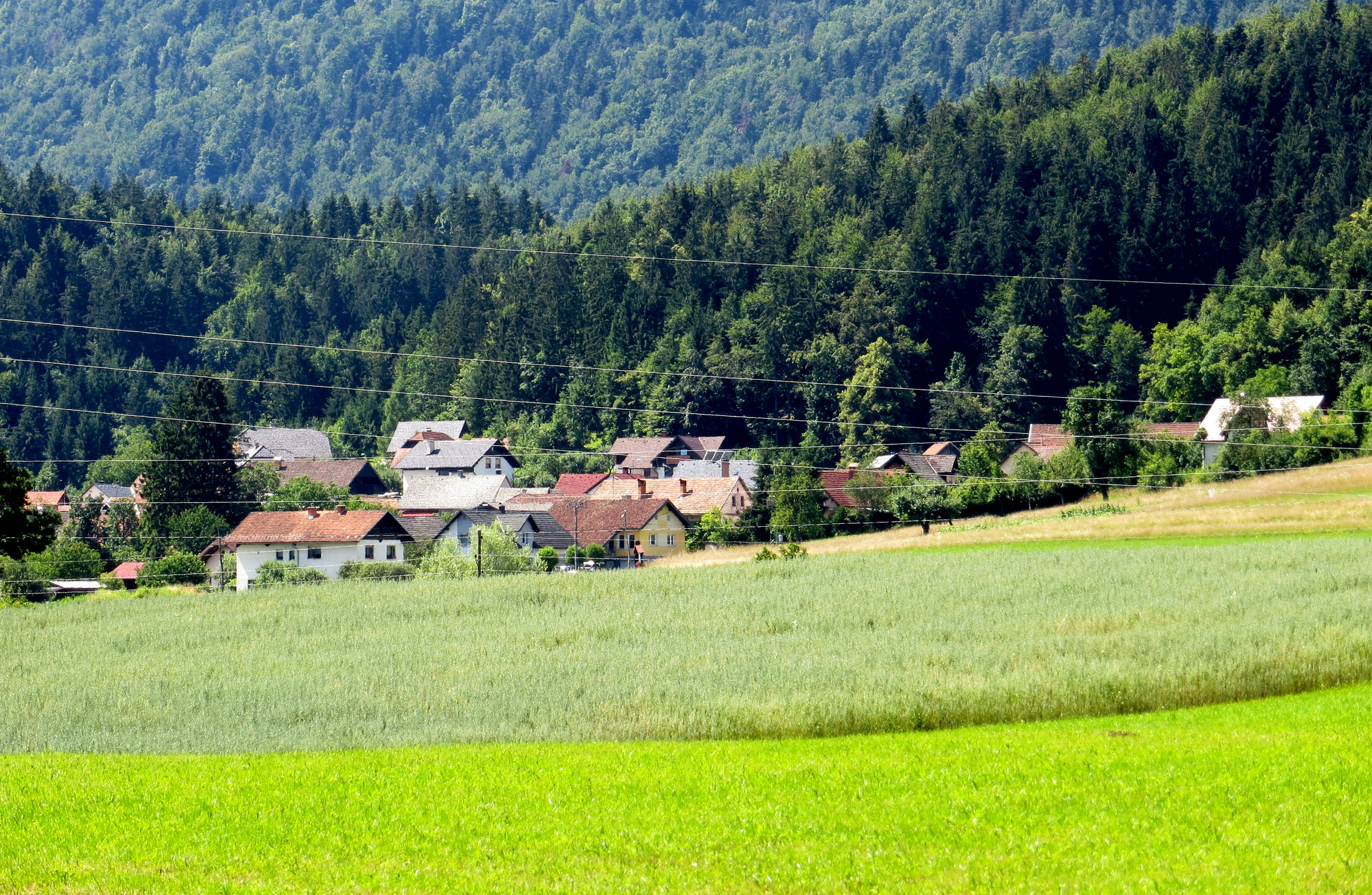

- Location in Slovenia
- Coordinates: 45°43′57.59″N 14°42′22.11″E
- Country: Slovenia
- Traditional region: Lower Carniola
- Statistical region: Southeast Slovenia
- Municipality: Ribnica

Area
  - Total: 0.8 km^{2} (0.31 sq mi)
- Elevation: 508.5 m (1,668 ft)

Population (2002)
  - Total: 94
- Postal code: 1310

Bukovica (pronounced [ˈbuːkɔʋitsa]; German: Bukowitz) is a small settlement west of the town of Ribnica in southern Slovenia. The area is part of the traditional region of Lower Carniola and is now included in the Southeast Slovenia Statistical Region.

== Name ==
Bukovica is a common toponym and oronym in Slovenia. It is derived from the adjective bukov 'beech' (from bukev 'beech tree') and originally referred to the local vegetation. In the past the German name was Bukowitz.
