= Rob, Velike Lašče =

Rob
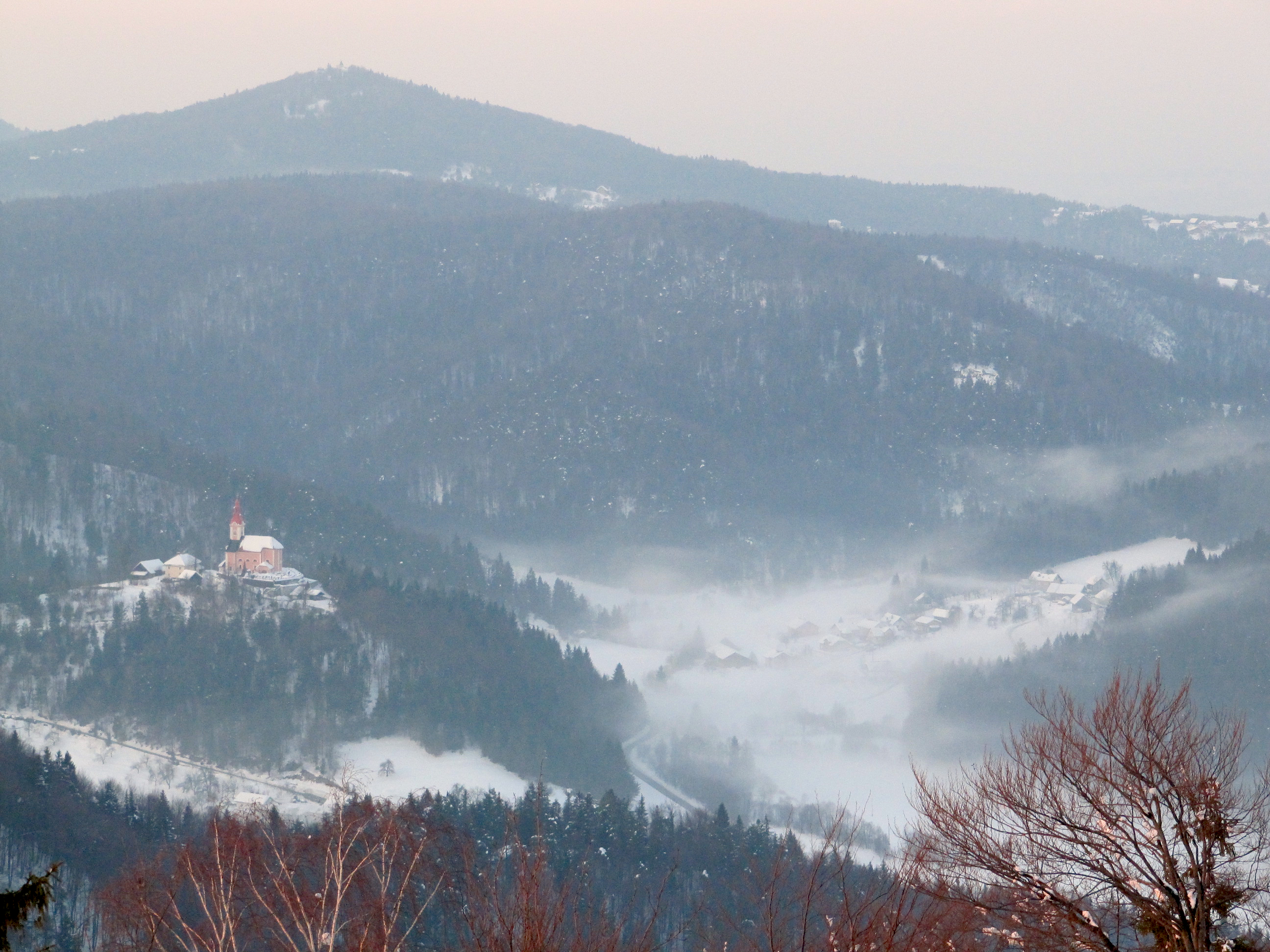

- Location in Slovenia
- Coordinates: 45°50′53.58″N 14°34′16.9″E
- Country: Slovenia
- Traditional region: Lower Carniola
- Statistical region: Central Slovenia
- Municipality: Velike Lašče

Area
  - Total: 1.27 km^{2} (0.49 sq mi)
- Elevation: 507.9 m (1,666 ft)

Population (2002)
  - Total: 60
- Postal code: 1314

Rob (pronounced [ˈɾoːp]) is a settlement in the Municipality of Velike Lašče in Slovenia. The area is part of the traditional region of Lower Carniola and is now included in the Central Slovenia Statistical Region.

== Name ==
Rob was attested in historical sources as Rab in 1463, 1467, and 1484. The name is derived from the common noun rob 'edge'. The village is located at the edges of the Rute Plateau and Mačkovec Plateau, where they meet the alluvial valley of the Rašica River and the Mišja Valley (Slovene: Mišja dolina) .

== Church ==
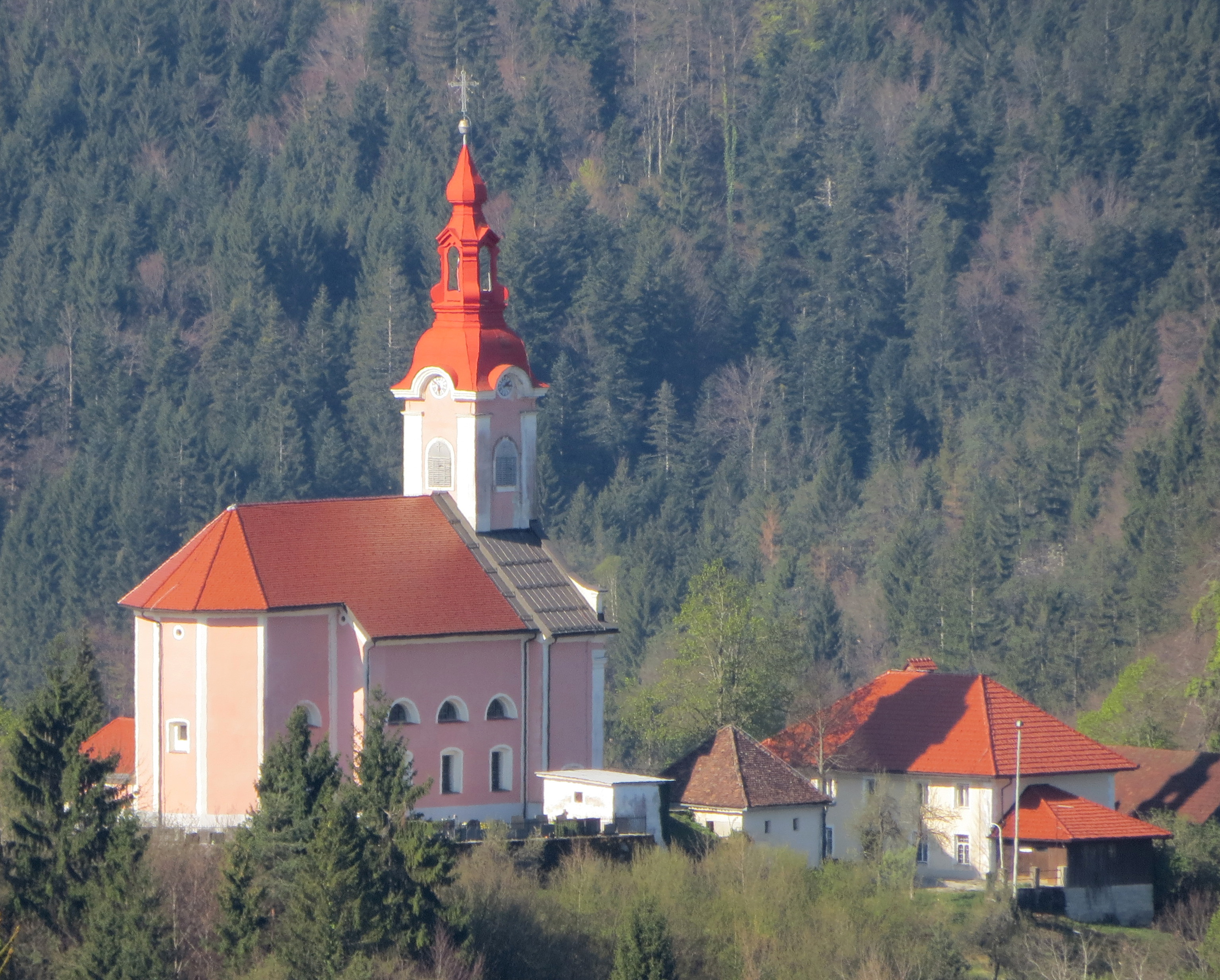
Nativity of Mary Church

The local parish church, built on a hill north of the village, is dedicated to the Nativity of Mary and belongs to the Roman Catholic Archdiocese of Ljubljana. It was built in 1845 on the site of an earlier church.
