= Velike Lašče =

- Location in Slovenia
- Coordinates: 45°50′10.67″N 14°38′15.89″E
- Country: Slovenia
- Traditional region: Lower Carniola
- Statistical region: Central Slovenia
- Municipality: Velike Lašče

Area
  - Total: 6.0 km^{2} (2.3 sq mi)
- Elevation: 526.5 m (1,727 ft)

Population (2012)
  - Total: 724
- Postal code: 1315 Velike Lašče

Velike Lašče (pronounced [ˈʋeːlikɛ ˈlaːʃtʃɛ]; German: Großlaschitz) is a town in Slovenia. It is the seat of the Municipality of Velike Lašče. It is part of the traditional region of Lower Carniola and is now included in the Central Slovenia Statistical Region.

== Name ==
The name Velike Lašče literally means 'big Lašče', distinguishing the town from the neighboring village of Male Lašče (literally, 'little Lašče'). The name of the settlements was first attested in written sources in 1145 as Lasis (and as Lasissa in 1251, and Lasitsch in 1256). The medieval attestations indicate that the name was originally *Lašiče, an accusative plural form of the patronymic Lašič, derived from the name Lah—thus meaning 'the place where Lah's people live'. The name Lah is derived from Vlah and originally referred to the Romanized Celtic population, and later to Romance speakers, including Italians and Uskoks. In the past the German name was Großlaschitz.

== Mass graves ==
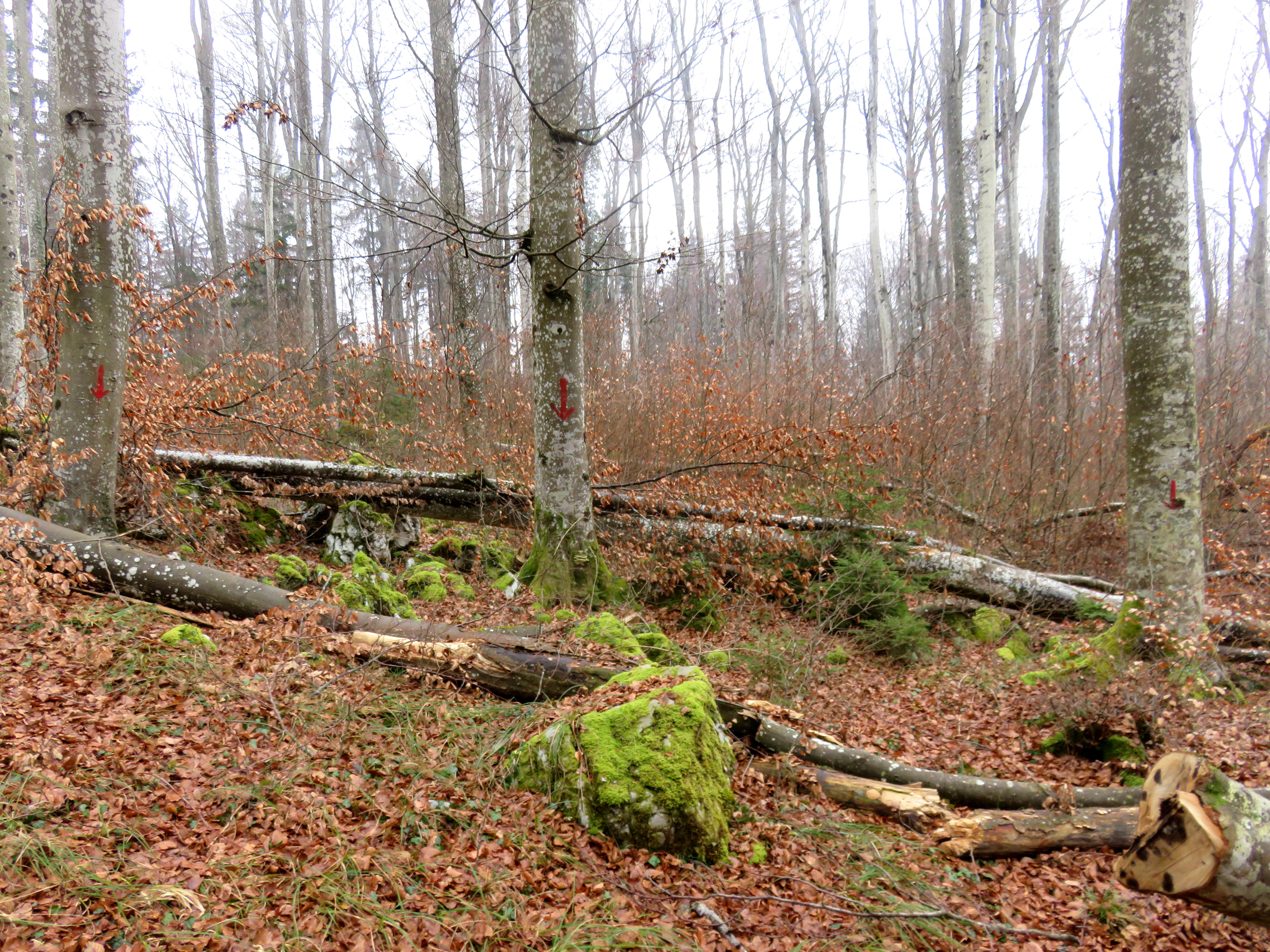
Marked trees at the Jamnik Woods Mass Grave

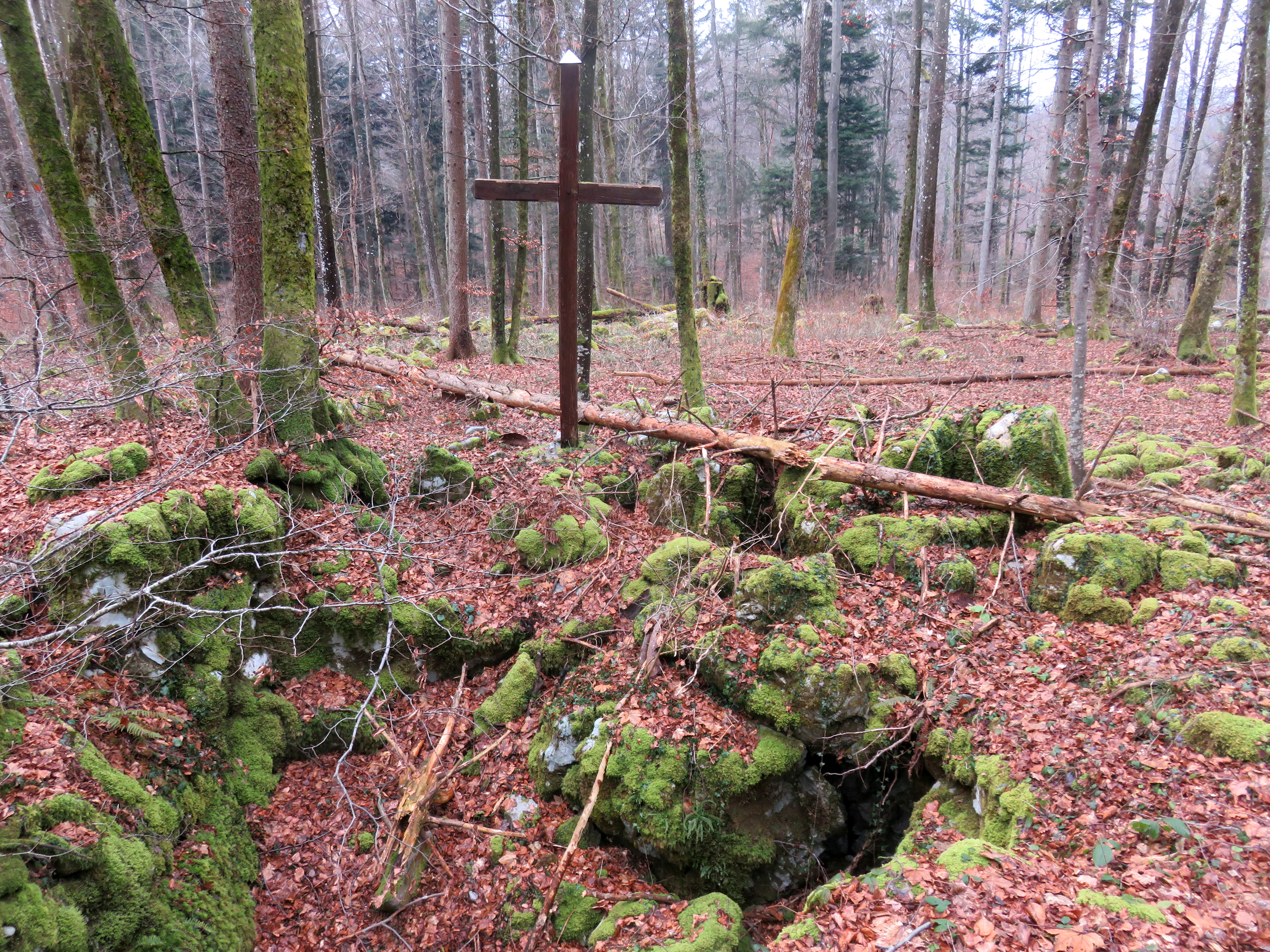
The Train Station Mass Grave

Mass Graves in Velike Lašče

Velike Lašče is the site of two known mass graves associated with the Second World War. The Jamnik Woods Mass Grave (Slovene: Grobišče Jamnikov gozd) is located in the woods east of the train station. It contains the remains of civilians and local anti-communist militia members, who were allied with the Italian forces. The Train Station Mass Grave (Grobišče nad postajo) is located in the woods northeast of the train station. It contains the remains of undetermined victims.

== Church ==
The parish church in the settlement is dedicated to the Nativity of Mary and belongs to the Roman Catholic Archdiocese of Ljubljana. It is a large Neo-Romanesque church built after the original building dating to the 13th century was destroyed by fire in 1856. Its double belfry is a dominant landmark on the local skyline. In front of the church is an obelisk monument to Fran Levstik, erected in 1889.

== Gallery ==
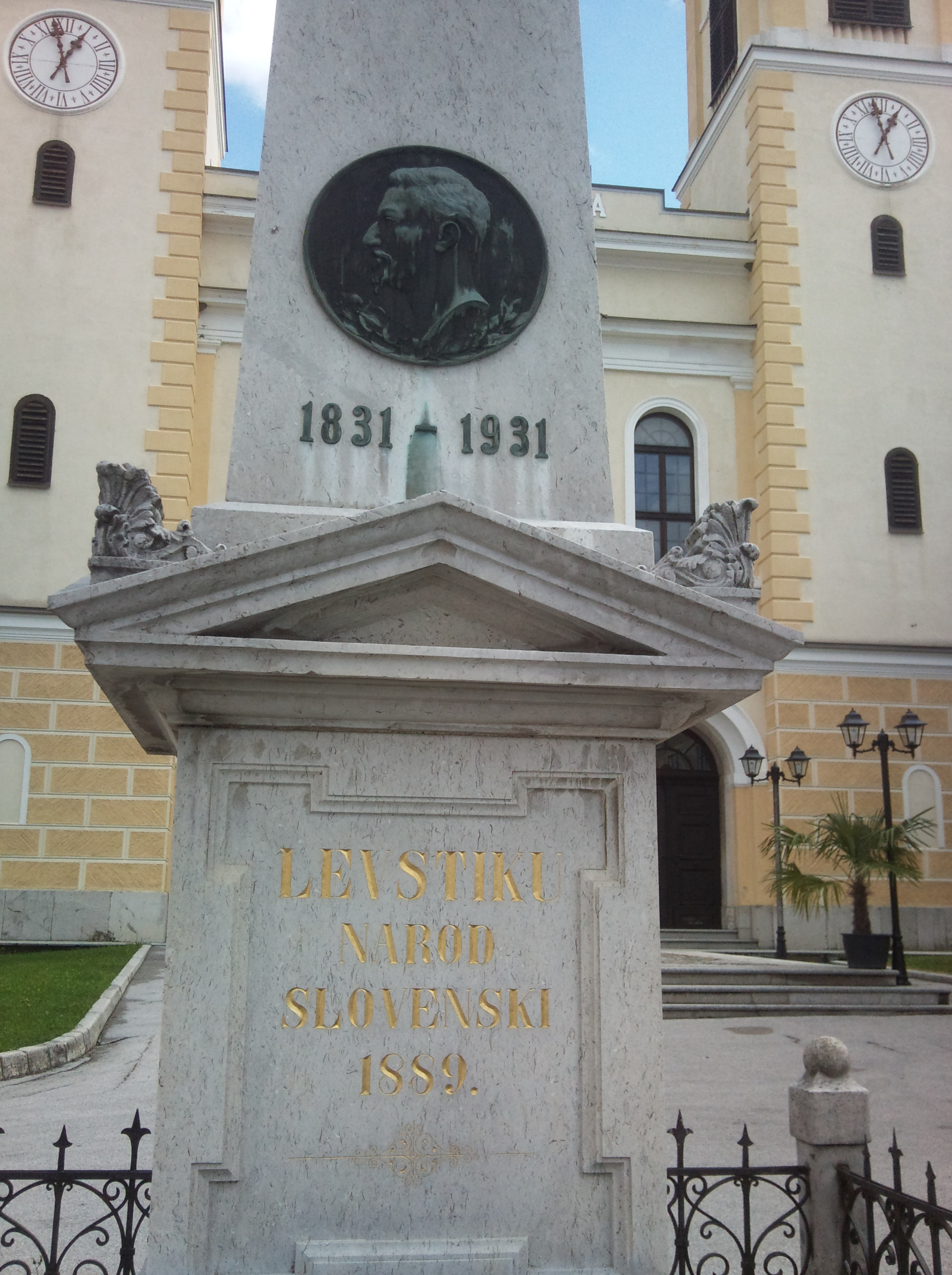
Fran Levstik monument
