= Ustje, Ig =

Ustje
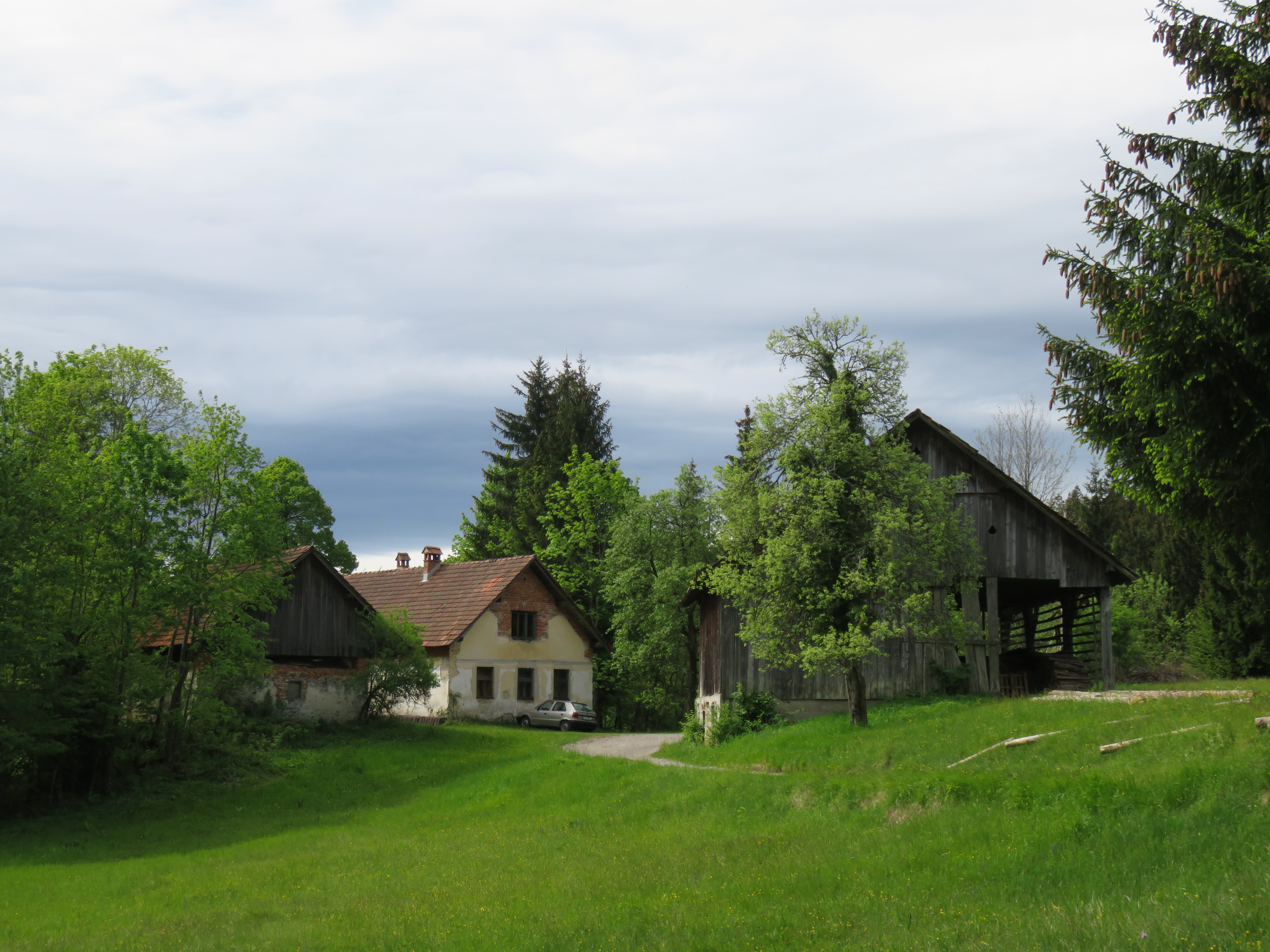
- The Benko farm in Ustje

- Location in Slovenia
- Coordinates: 45°53′22″N 14°28′46″E
- Country: Slovenia
- Traditional region: Inner Carniola
- Statistical region: Central Slovenia
- Municipality: Ig
- Elevation: 786 m (2,579 ft)

Ustje (pronounced [ˈuːstjɛ]) is a former settlement in the Municipality of Ig in central Slovenia. It is now part of the village of Iška. The area is part of the traditional region of Inner Carniola. The municipality is now included in the Central Slovenia Statistical Region.

== Geography ==
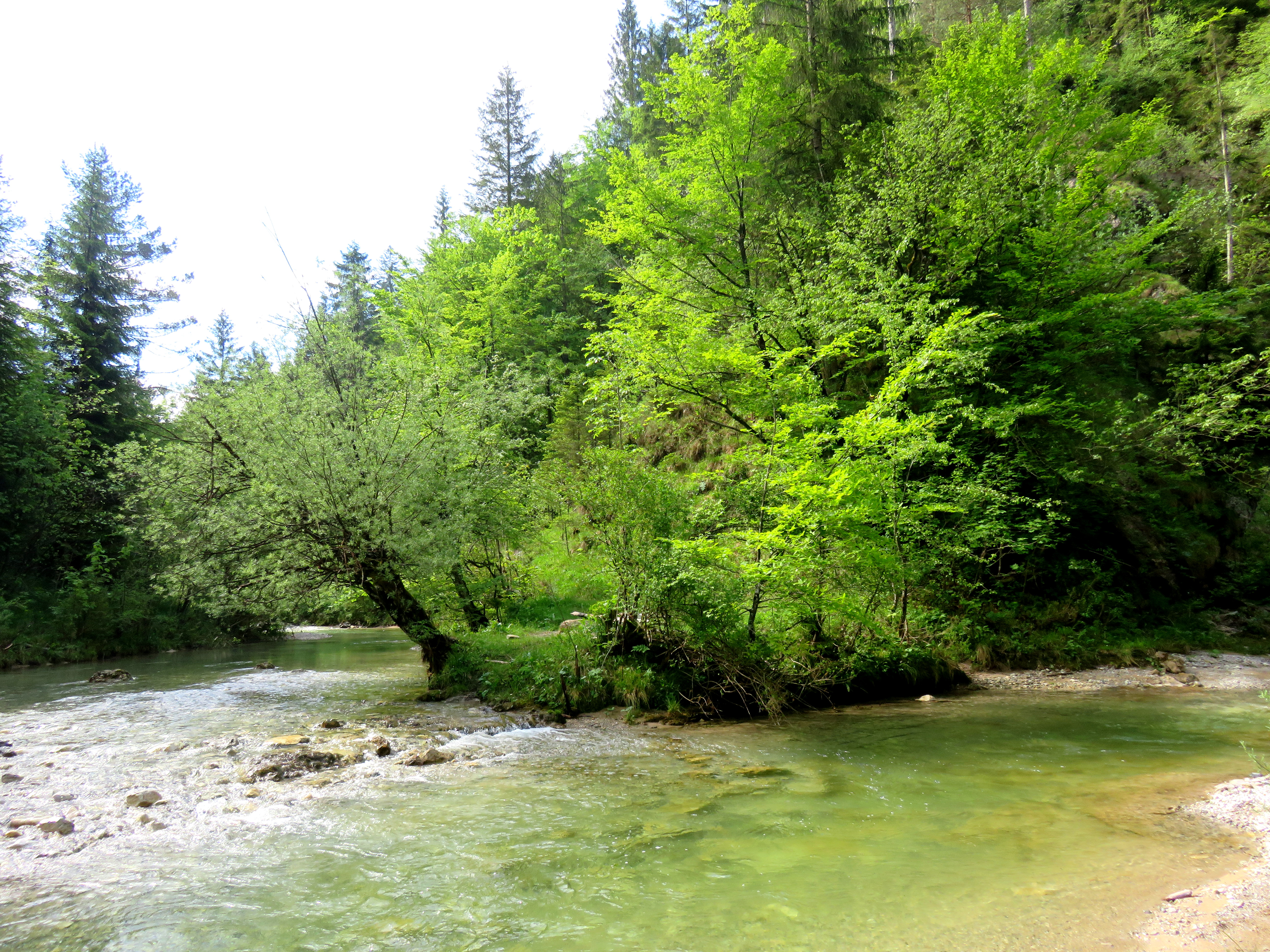
Confluence of the Iška River (left) and Zala River (right) below Ustje

Ustje comprises two groups of what were isolated farms; the Benko farm lies northeast of the historically main hamlet of Ustje. The settlement is located in the extreme southwest part of the territory of Iška. Krvavica Spring lies below the road to Ustje. Mount Krim rises to the north and the terrain drops to the Iška Gorge to the east, where the Zala River empties into the Iška River.

== Name ==
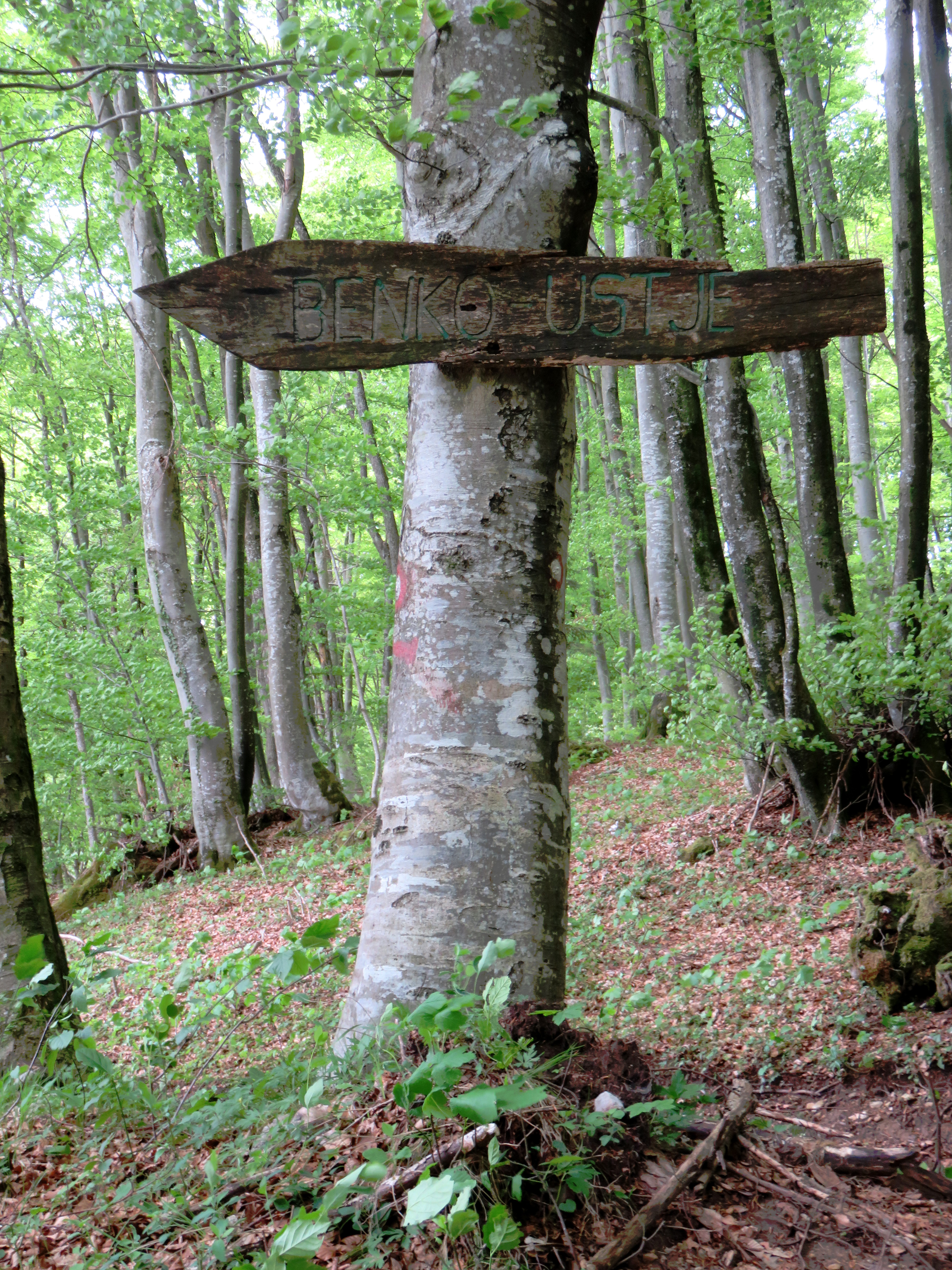
Sign for Ustje and the Benko farm

The name Ustje is derived from the common noun ustje 'mouth of a river'. The name refers to the confluence of the Zala and Iška rivers southeast of the settlement. Compare also Ustje in the Municipality of Ajdovščina.

== History ==
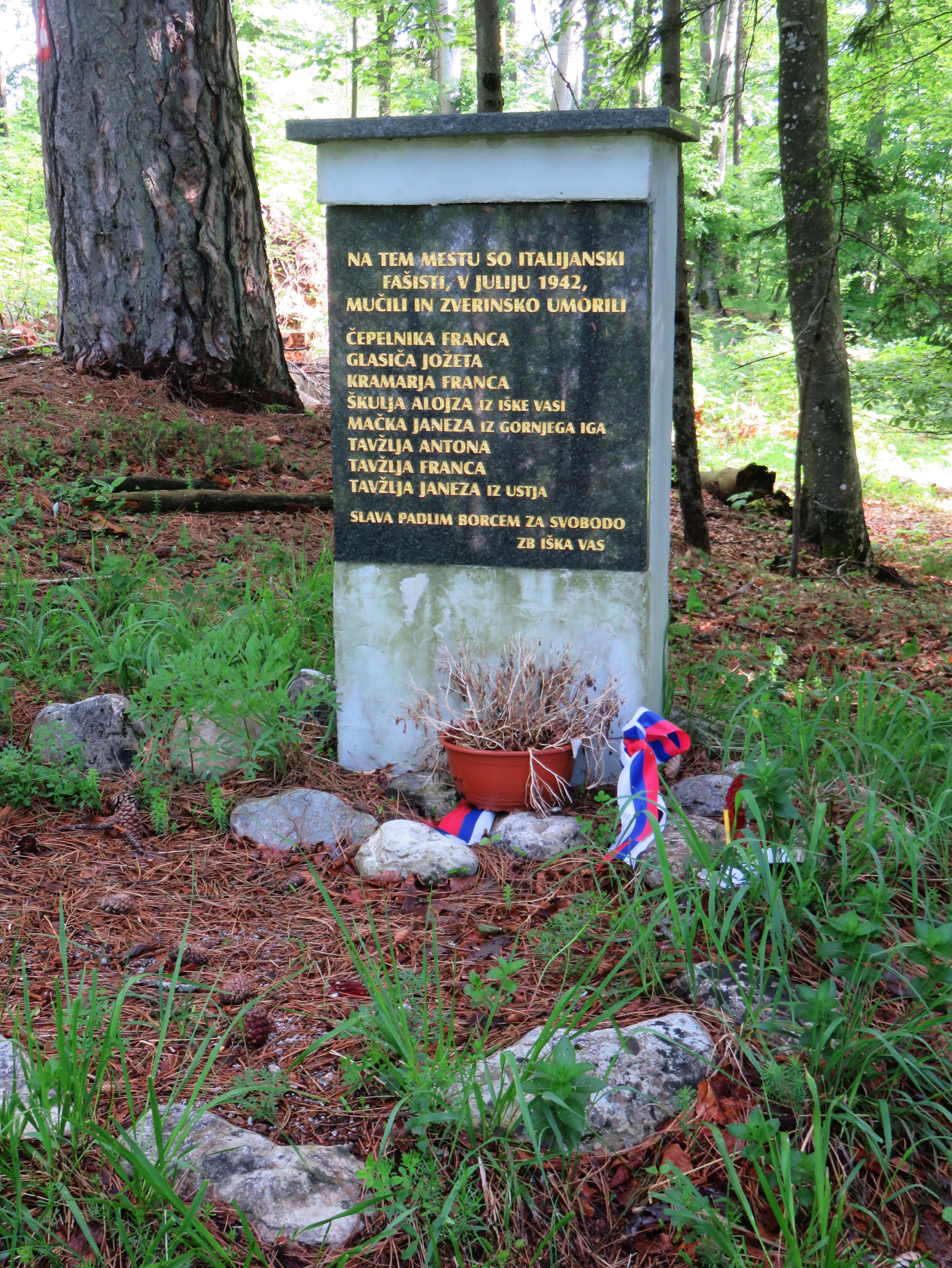
Memorial on Trenk Hill

Ustje was burned during the Second World War. A Partisan brigade headquarters was located at Ustje during the war; it was discovered by Italian forces, who executed several Partisans at nearby Trenk Hill.

Ustje was annexed by Gornji Ig in 1952, ending its existence as an independent settlement. However, today it is part of the village of Iška.
