= Iska =

Iska, ISKA or Iška may refer to

- ISKA (sports governing body), also known as the International Sport Karate Association or International Sport Kickboxing Association
- Iska, Estonia, a village
- Iška, a river in Slovenia
- Iška, Ig, a settlement in Slovenia
- Iška Loka, a village in Slovenia
- Iška Vas, a village in Slovenia
- Iska Geri (1920–2002), German film and television actress
- Iska's Journey, a 2007 Hungarian film
- Odyssey of Iska, a 1971 album by American jazz saxophonist Wayne Shorter

== See also ==
- ISCA (disambiguation)
