= Sekirišče =

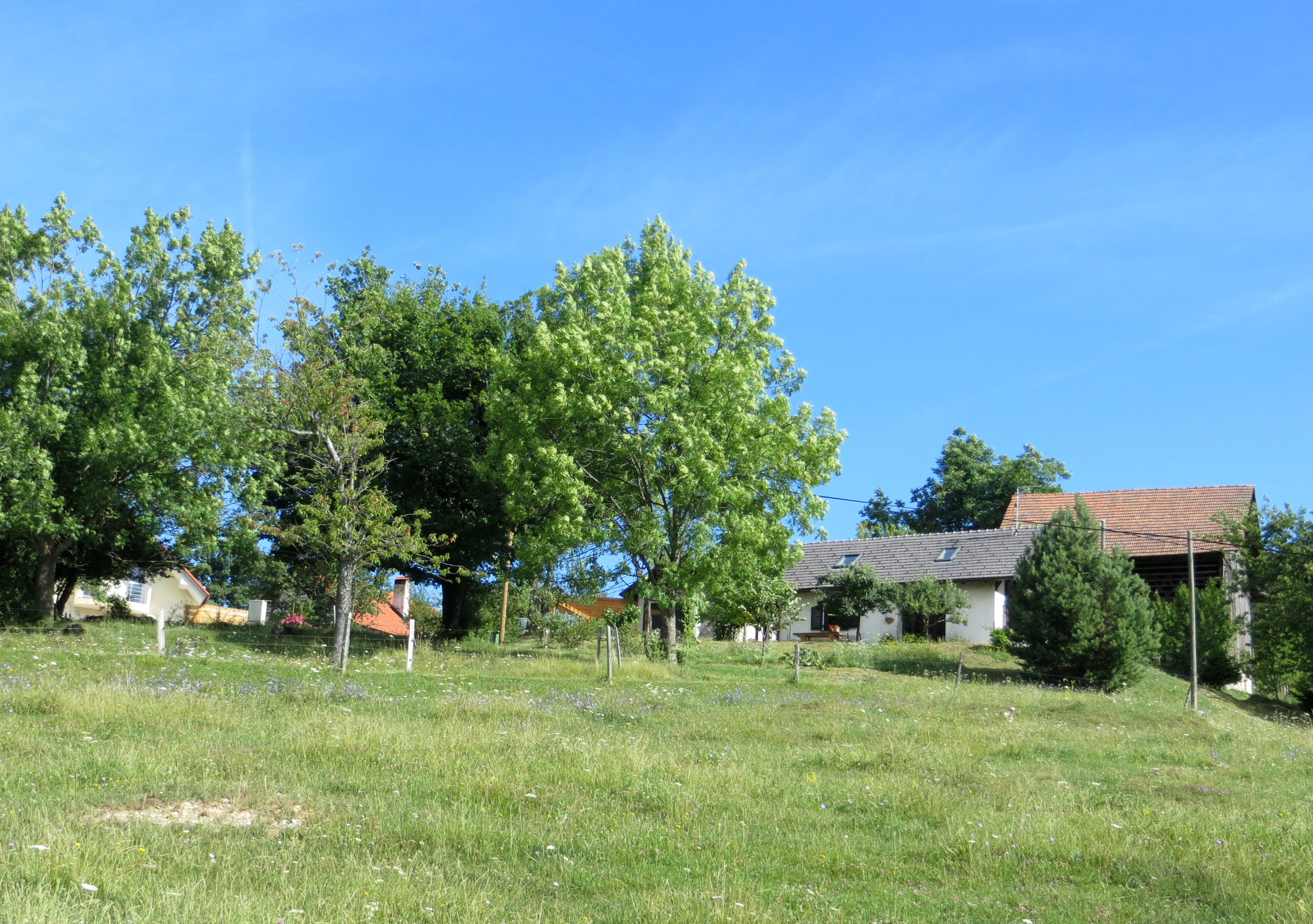

- Location in Slovenia
- Coordinates: 45°51′42.65″N 14°32′11.8″E
- Country: Slovenia
- Traditional region: Lower Carniola
- Statistical region: Central Slovenia
- Municipality: Velike Lašče

Area
  - Total: 2.69 km^{2} (1.04 sq mi)
- Elevation: 732.5 m (2,403 ft)

Population (2002)
  - Total: 11
- Postal code: 1314

Sekirišče (pronounced [sɛˈkiːɾiʃtʃɛ]; in older sources also Sekiršče) is a small settlement north of the road that leads from Rob to Krvava Peč in the Municipality of Velike Lašče in central Slovenia. The municipality is part of the traditional region of Lower Carniola and is now included in the Central Slovenia Statistical Region.

== Name ==
The settlement was first attested in written sources in 1484 as Szekiritza, and in 1485 as Szekiricza. The name Sekirišče is derived from the Slavic nickname Sěkyra (related also to the place names Sekirn in Austria, Sekeřice in the Czech Republic, etc.). The name is unlikely to refer to a place cleared by an ax (Slovene: sekira), as sometimes suggested.

== Mass grave ==
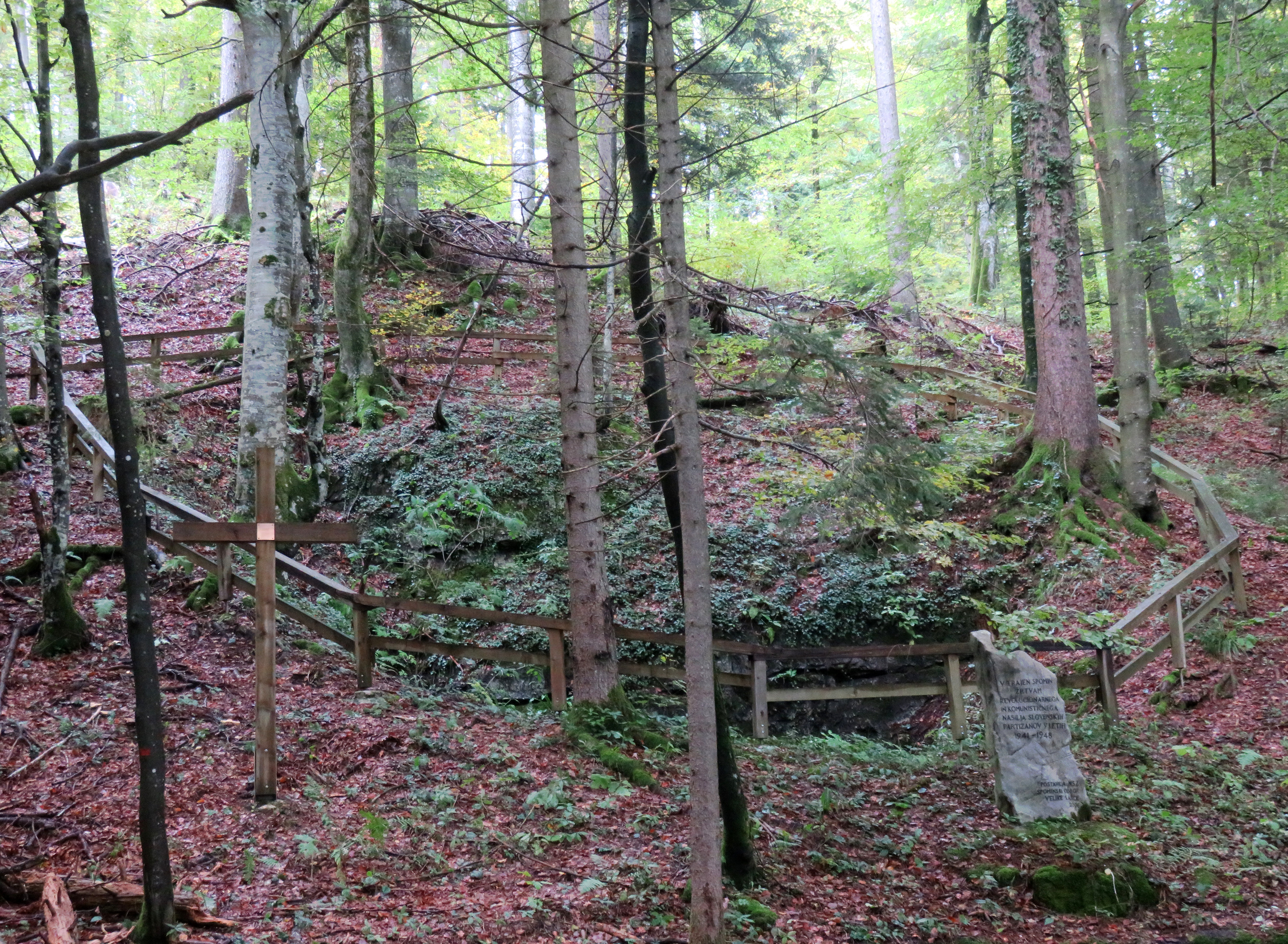
The Pavlin Shaft Mass Grave

Sekirišče is the site of a mass grave associated with the Second World War. The Pavlin Shaft Mass Grave (Slovene: Grobišče Pavlinovo brezno), also known as the Repičnik Shaft Mass Grave (Grobišče Brezno Repičnik), is located 1.5 kilometers (0.93 mi) northeast of Krvava Peč on the south slope of Mount Repičnik. It contains the remains of unidentified victims.
