= Iška, Ig =

Iška
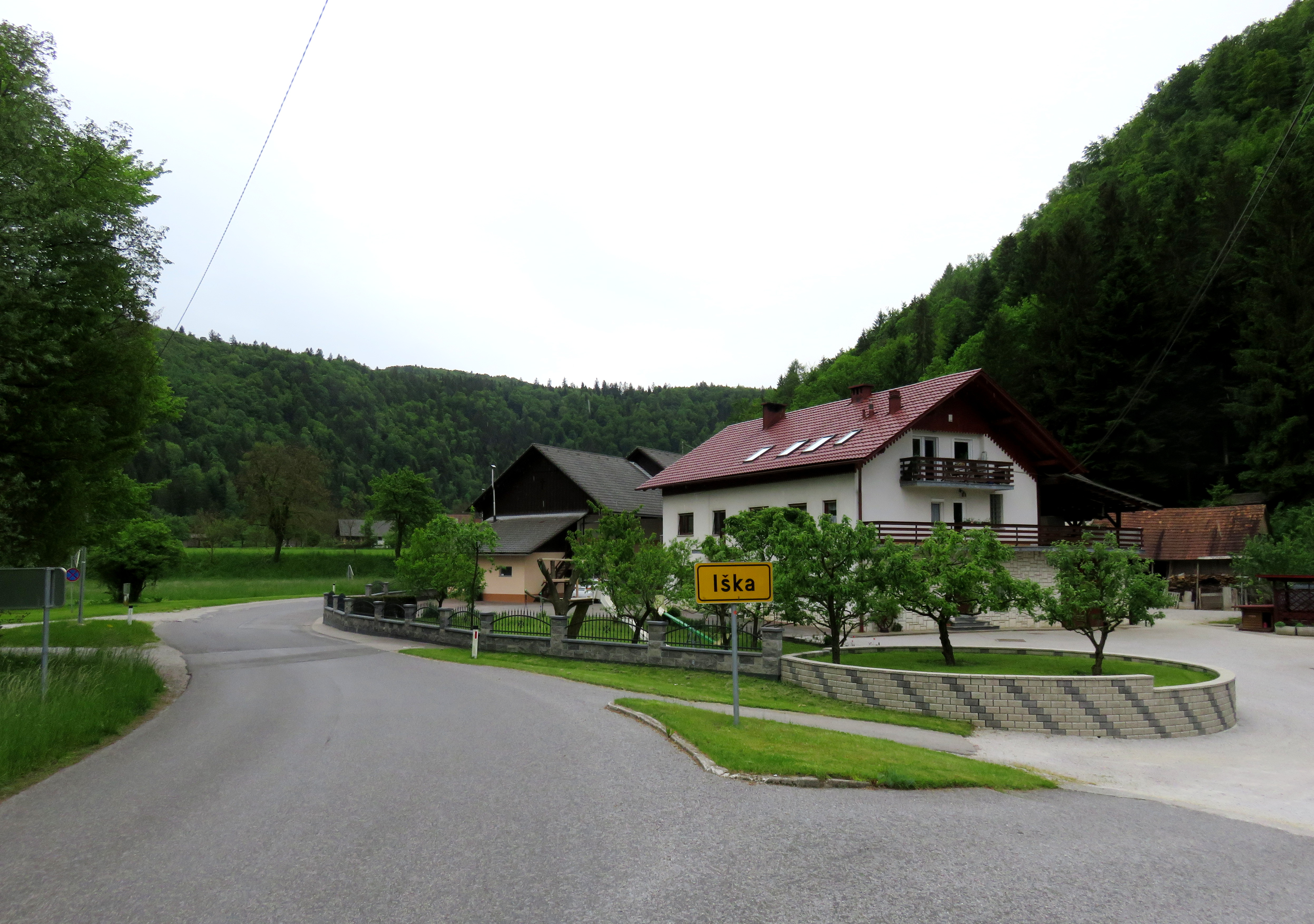

- Location in Slovenia
- Coordinates: 45°55′11.78″N 14°30′24.25″E
- Country: Slovenia
- Traditional region: Inner Carniola
- Statistical region: Central Slovenia
- Municipality: Ig

Area
  - Total: 10.61 km^{2} (4.10 sq mi)
- Elevation: 347.3 m (1,139 ft)

Population (2002)
  - Total: 195
- Postal code: 1292

Iška (pronounced [ˈiːʃka]; German: Eisdorf) is a settlement in Upper Iška Valley in the Municipality of Ig in central Slovenia. The entire municipality is part of the traditional region of Inner Carniola and is now included in the Central Slovenia Statistical Region. The settlement includes the hamlet of Mala Vas (Slovene: Mala vas, German: Kleindorf), where the road to Gornji Ig branches off.

== Geography ==
Iška is a row village along a road surrounded by hills in the valley of the Iška River. The main hills surrounding the settlement are Travnik Hill (728 m) to the west and Stražar Hill (794 m) to the east. There are a few fields and several meadows along the road, as well as a number of vacation houses. The Laz Woods lies to the west, and the Zavod and Rebrica woods to the east. The wooded countryside is a habitat for roe deer, chamois, and bears. Benko Cave is in the hills west of the main population center. The territory of the settlement extends south to the Iška Gorge, where there is a path to Vrbica Hill (422 m) and the confluence of the Iška and Zala rivers. From here, trails continue to Rakitna, Krvava Peč, and the Bloke Plateau. There are also several springs in the surrounding hills.

== History ==
Before the Second World War, there were many flour mills and sawmills along the Iška River. Most of these have been abandoned. During the Second World War, all of the vacation houses in the gorge were burned, and have been replaced by newer construction. The Iška Gorge Lodge (Slovene: Dom v Iškem Vintgarju) was built in 1948, offering accommodation and fishing permits.

=== Mass graves ===
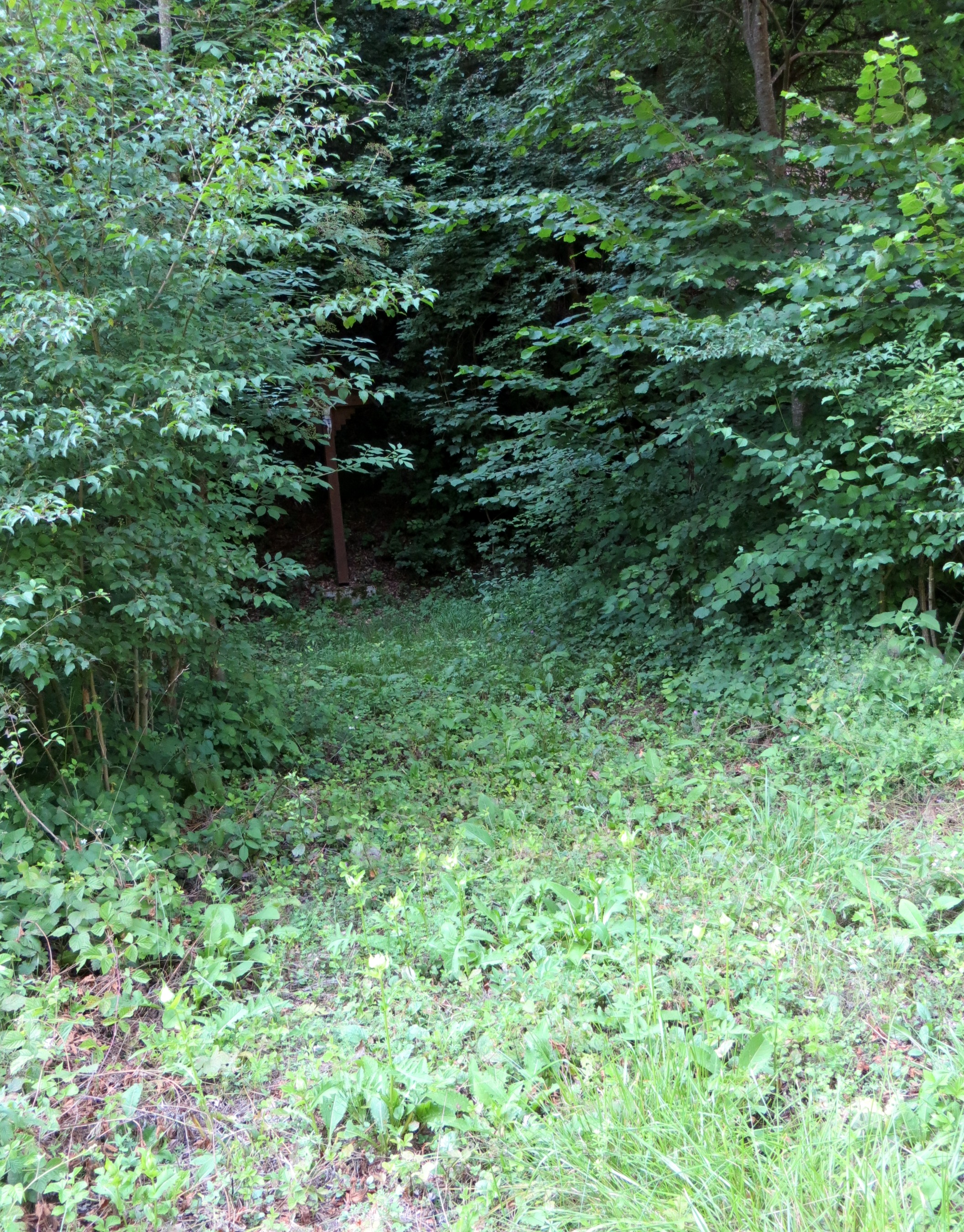
Romani Mass Grave

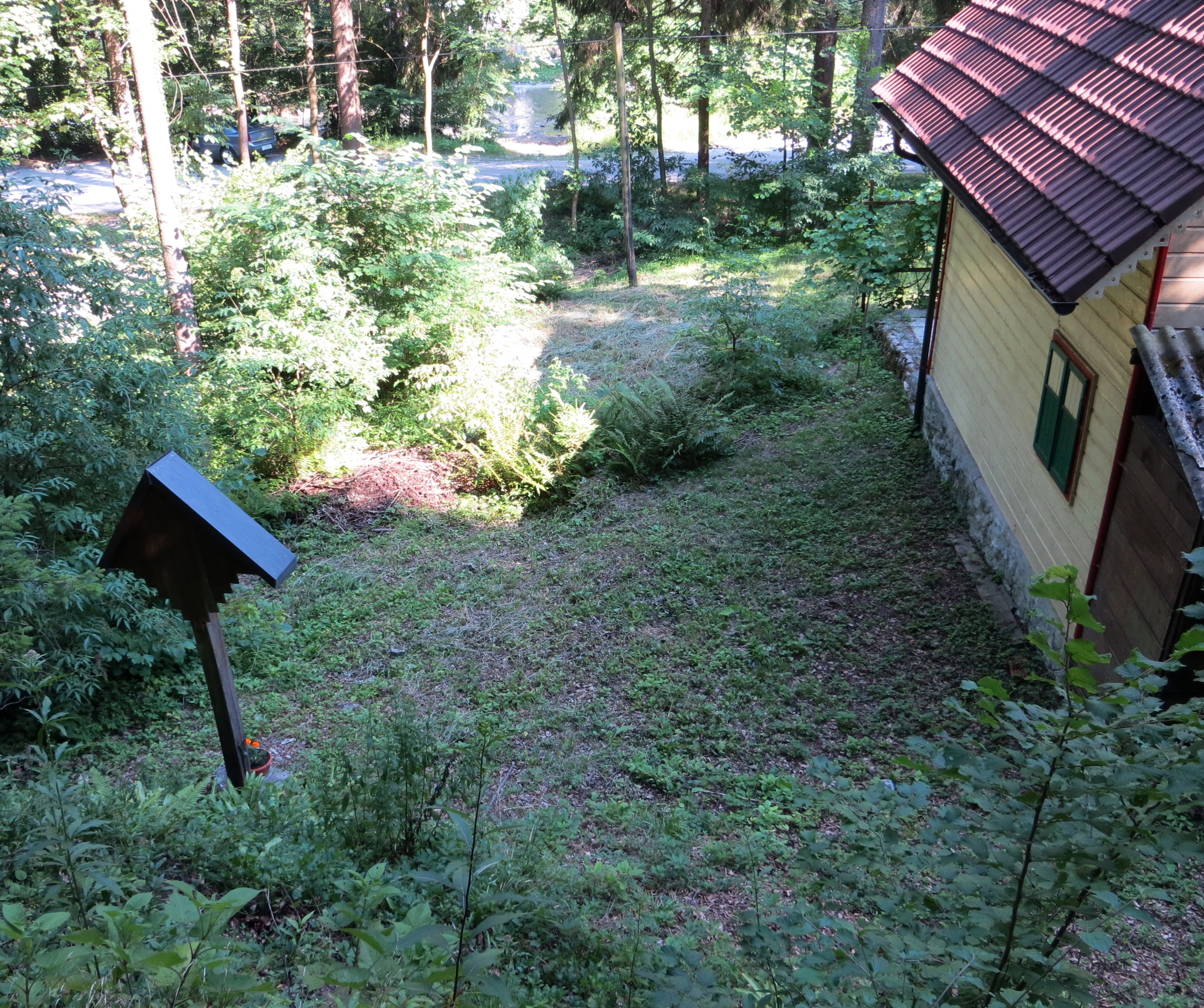
Wounded Mass Grave

Mass graves

Iška is the site of two known mass graves from during and after the Second World War. Both are located south of the settlement, in the Iška Gorge. The Romani Mass Grave (Slovene: Grobišče Romov) is located in the Benko Meadow and is marked by a wooden cross below a cliff, south of the house at Iška no. 45. It contains the remains of 43 Romani killed by the Partisans in May 1942. The Wounded Mass Grave (Grobišče ranjencev) is located near the vacation house at Iška no. 21. A cross stands north of the grave, below a slope, and is visible from the road. The grave contains the remains of wounded Home Guard members murdered here after the war. Both of the wooden crosses at the sites bear the carved inscriptions Bog bo obrisal vse solze iz naših oči – tudi ne bo več žalovanja, ne vpitja, ne bolečin, zakaj kar je bilo prej je minilo. Postoj ob meni brat, da skupaj bova našla pot. (And God shall wipe away all tears from our eyes—there shall be no more sorrow, nor crying, nor pain: for the former things are passed away. ... Rest in peace. Remain by my side, brother, and together we shall find the way.) The first cross also reads Tukaj čaka na vstajenje 43 Romov od maja 1942 (Here 43 Roma from May 1942 await the resurrection) and the second reads Tukaj čaka na vstajenje 52 slovenskih domobranskih ranjencev od binkoštne sobote 1945 (Here 52 Slovene Home Guard wounded from Pentecost Saturday [May 19] 1945 await the resurrection).

In 2022, the Slovene government designated May 17 as National Remembrance Day for the Victims of Communist Violence (Slovene: nacionalni dan spomina na žrtve komunističnega nasilja), coinciding with the date when the Romani victims were killed.

== Church ==
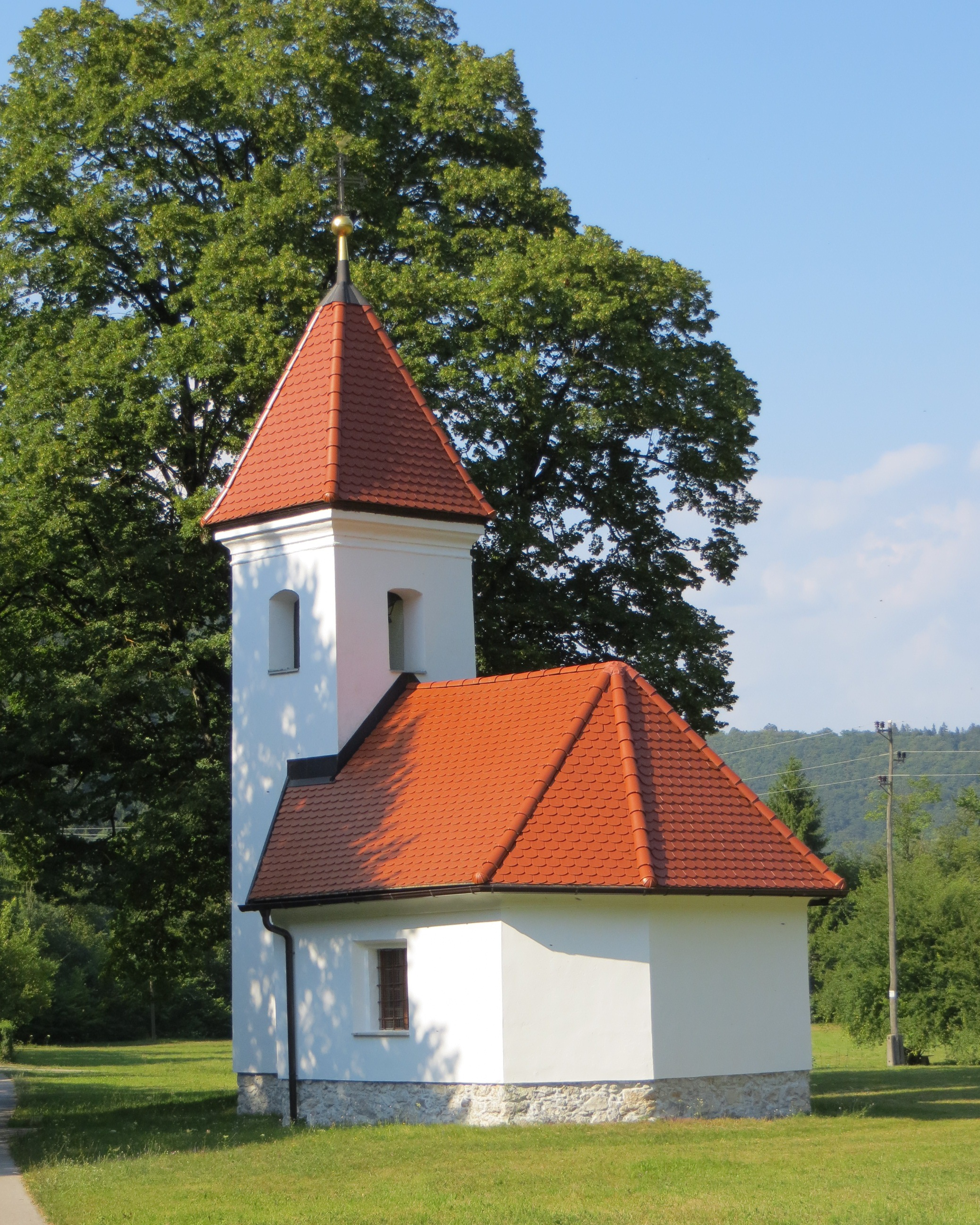
Saint Gertrude's Church

The local church, built on the right bank of the river in the main part of the settlement, is dedicated to Saint Gertrude (Slovene: sveta Jerdt) and belongs to the Parish of Ig. It dates to the 18th century. It is a Baroque structure with a square nave and a polygonal chancel walled on three sides. The bell tower stands against the west wall of the nave.

== Cultural heritage ==
In addition to Saint Gertrude's Church, several other sites in Iška are registered as cultural heritage:

- The Iška Archaeological Site lies in the main settlement. Metal items from the late Bronze Age have been discovered here.
- The Grad Archaeological Site (Slovene: Arheološko območje Grad) lies in the hills west of the main settlement. It is unexcavated; metal items have been found in the area indicating a prehistoric presence.
- The farm at Iška no. 15 is located along the road in the Iška Gorge. It includes a two-story house with architectural elements from the mid-19th century and a semicircular door casing with the year 1842 carved into it. The farm has a stone grain mill and a wooden sawmill with a Venetian frame saw along a side arm of the Iška River, east of the road.
- The Iška dam and millrace are located between the houses at Iška no. 14 and 15. The structure consists of a wooden dam reinforced with iron beams, a reservoir, a sluice gate, and a millrace dating from the mid-19th century. The dam was damaged in 2004 but was restored in an authentic manner, preserving its historical appearance.
- A chapel-shrine stands on the eastern edge of the Iška Plain, along the road to Iška Vas. It dates from the first half of the 19th century. It has a deep main niche and shallower niches on the sides.
- There is a memorial plaque dedicated to Anton Župec, a communist activist from Iška Vas that was killed on 20 March 1942. The square granite plaque was installed on a cliff along the road to Gornji Ig in 1971, approximately 250 m from the fork in the road to the hamlet of Mala Vas.
- The Benko Mill (Slovene: Benkotova žaga) is an operating water-driven sawmill with a Venetian frame saw located opposite house no. 14 along a branch of the Iška River. It dates from the mid-19th century and is installed in a wooden building with a masonry foundation.
