= Pecki =

Pecki may refer to:

- Pečki, a village in Slovenia
- Pecki, Croatia, a village near Petrinja, Croatia
