= Uzmani =

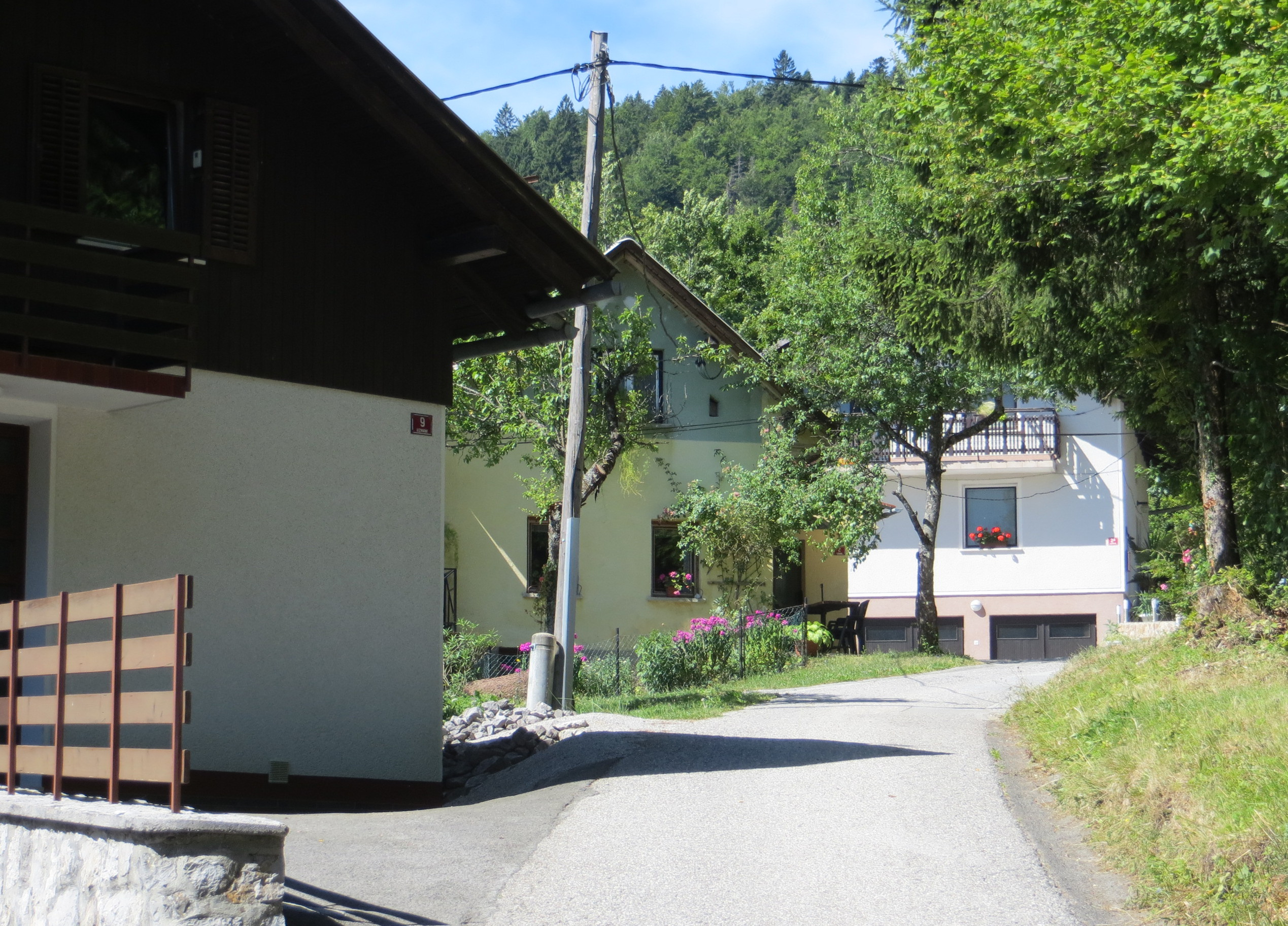

- Location in Slovenia
- Coordinates: 45°51′12.62″N 14°32′34.3″E
- Country: Slovenia
- Traditional region: Lower Carniola
- Statistical region: Central Slovenia
- Municipality: Velike Lašče

Area
  - Total: 1.92 km^{2} (0.74 sq mi)
- Elevation: 633.5 m (2,078 ft)

Population (2002)
  - Total: 20
- Postal code: 1315

Uzmani (pronounced [ˈuːzmani] or [uˈzmaːni]; in older sources also Uzmane, German: Usmane) is a settlement west of Rob in the Municipality of Velike Lašče in central Slovenia. It lies just off the road leading from Rob to Krvava Peč. The entire municipality is part of the traditional region of Lower Carniola and is now included in the Central Slovenia Statistical Region.
