= Ischia (disambiguation) =

Ischia is an island in the Province of Naples, Campania. Ischia may also refer to:

== Places ==
- Ischia (Pergine Valsugana), a civil parish of Pergine Valsugana (TN), Trentino-Alto Adige
- Ischia (town), a town in the island of Ischia, Campania
  - S.S. Ischia Isolaverde, the town's football team
- Ischia di Castro, a municipality in the Province of Viterbo, Lazio

== People ==
- Carlos Ischia, Argentine footballer and coach

== Other uses ==
- Ischia (grape), another name for the French/German wine grape Pinot Noir Précoce

== See also ==
- ISCA (disambiguation)
- Ischitella, a municipality in the Province of Foggia, Apulia
- Ischium, the hip bone
