= Purkače =

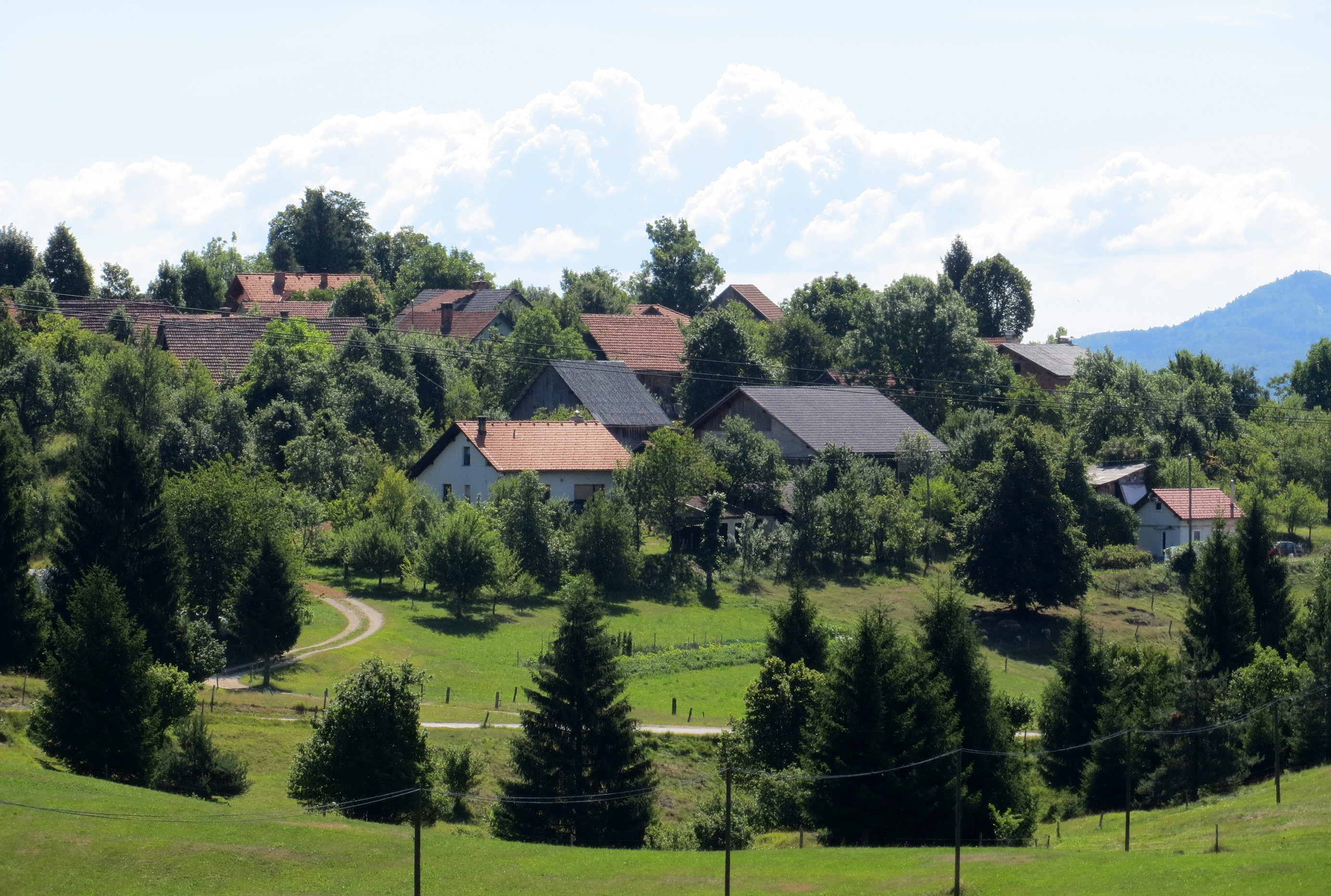

- Location in Slovenia
- Coordinates: 45°51′37.59″N 14°32′42.91″E
- Country: Slovenia
- Traditional region: Lower Carniola
- Statistical region: Central Slovenia
- Municipality: Velike Lašče

Area
  - Total: 2.03 km^{2} (0.78 sq mi)
- Elevation: 724.8 m (2,378 ft)

Population (2002)
  - Total: 24
- Postal code: 1314

Purkače (pronounced [ˈpuːɾkatʃɛ]; in older sources also Purkarče) is a small settlement just north of the road from Rob to Krvava Peč in the Municipality of Velike Lašče in central Slovenia. The entire municipality is part of the traditional region of Lower Carniola and is now included in the Central Slovenia Statistical Region.
