= Pečki =

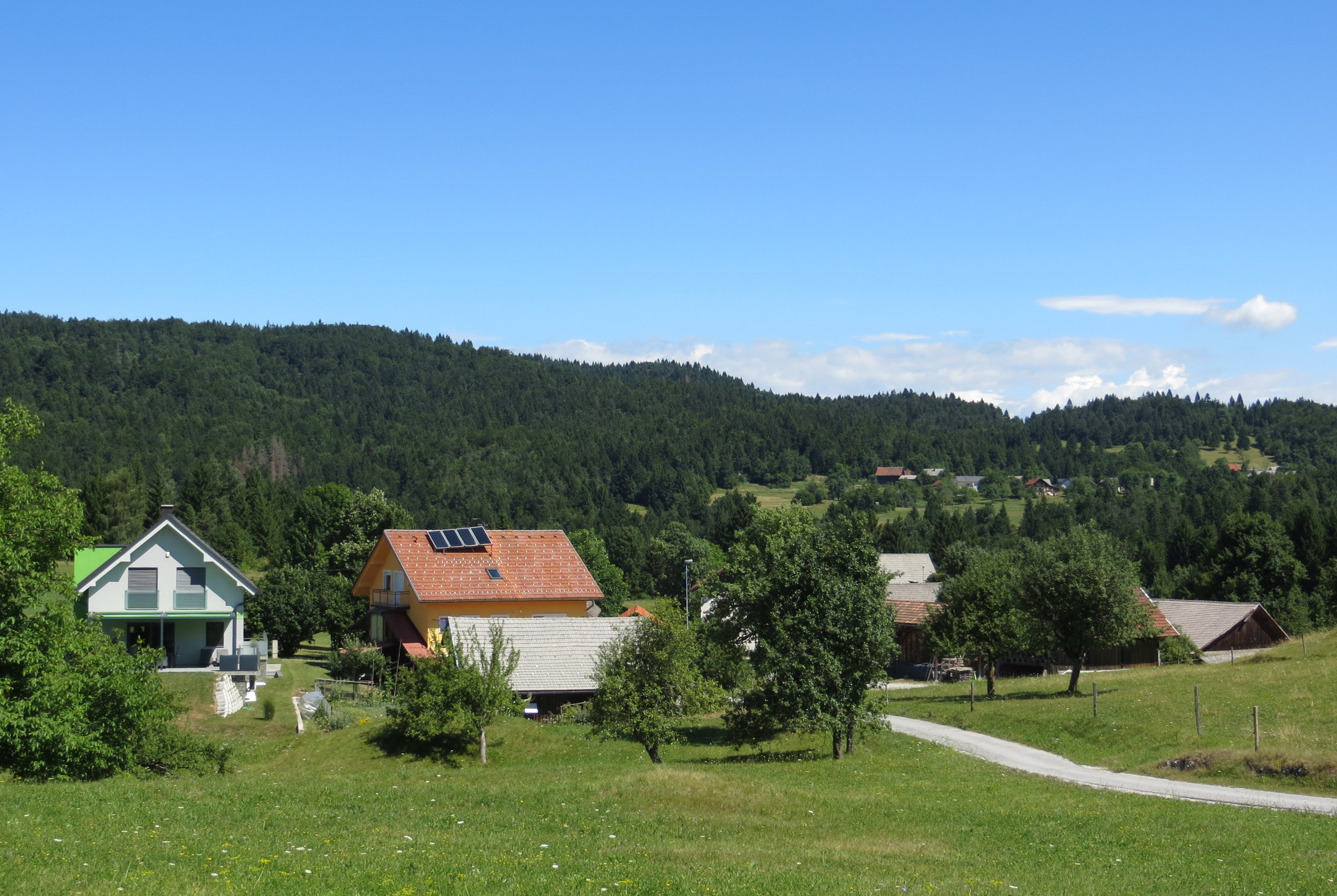

- Location in Slovenia
- Coordinates: 45°51′6.95″N 14°33′16.07″E
- Country: Slovenia
- Traditional region: Lower Carniola
- Statistical region: Central Slovenia
- Municipality: Velike Lašče

Area
  - Total: 0.53 km^{2} (0.20 sq mi)
- Elevation: 609.5 m (2,000 ft)

Population (2002)
  - Total: 11
- Postal code: 1314

Pečki (pronounced [ˈpeːtʃki] or [pɛtʃˈki]; in older sources also Pečke) is a small settlement on the northern side of the road from Rob to Krvava Peč in the Municipality of Velike Lašče in central Slovenia. The entire municipality is part of the traditional region of Lower Carniola and is now included in the Central Slovenia Statistical Region.
