= Ustje =

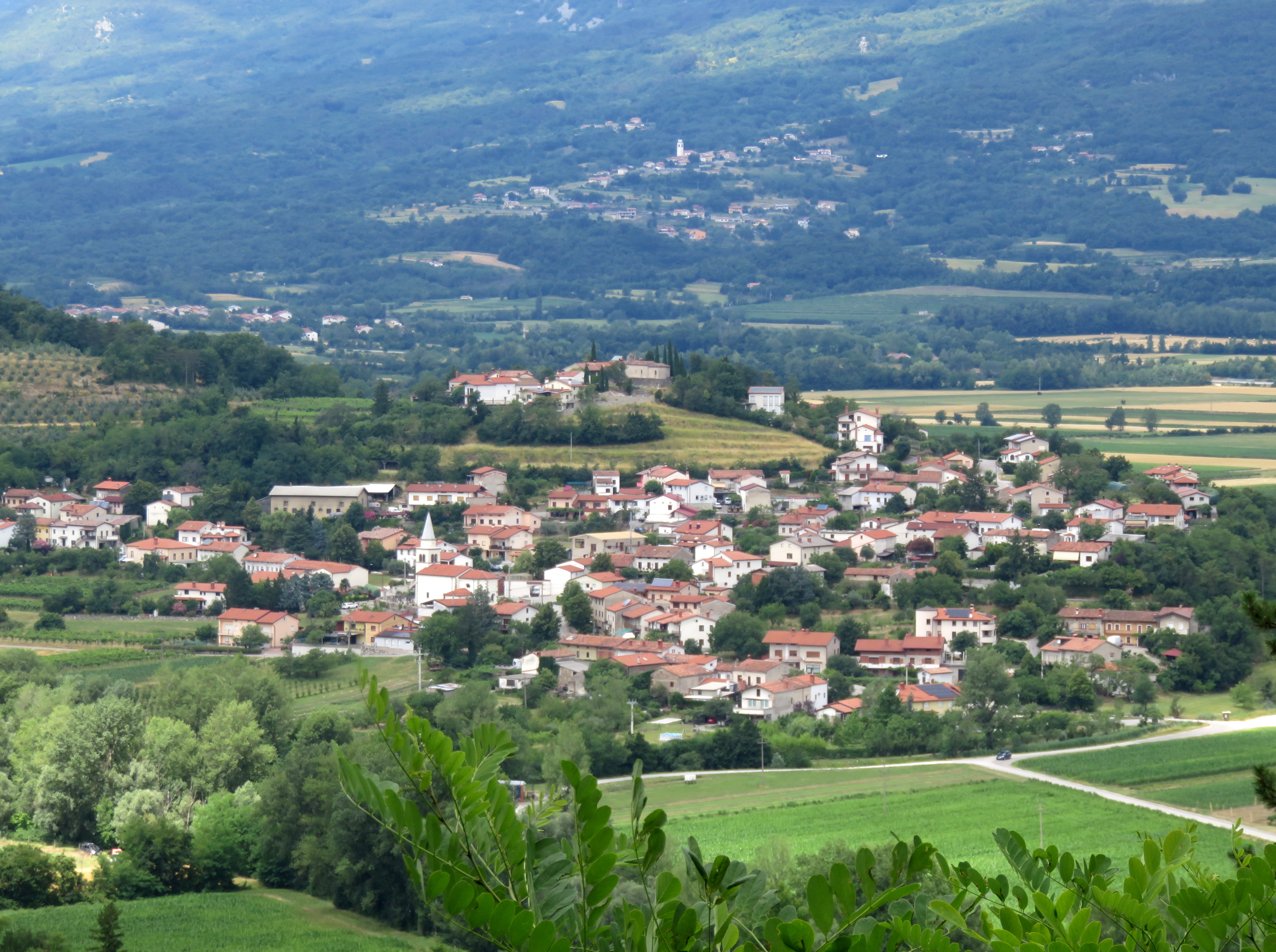

- Location in Slovenia
- Coordinates: 45°52′12.84″N 13°53′42.3″E
- Country: Slovenia
- Traditional region: Inner Carniola
- Statistical region: Gorizia
- Municipality: Ajdovščina

Area
  - Total: 2.77 km^{2} (1.07 sq mi)
- Elevation: 101.9 m (334 ft)

Population (2020)
  - Total: 344
  - Density: 124/km^{2} (322/sq mi)

Ustje (pronounced [ˈuːstjɛ]) is a village in the Vipava Valley south of Ajdovščina in the traditional Inner Carniola region of Slovenia. It is now generally regarded as part of the Slovenian Littoral.

== Name ==
The name Ustje is derived from the common noun ustje 'river mouth', referring to the location where Jovšček Creek joins the Vipava River. Some sources also claim that the name may originate from Saint Justus, to whom the parish church in the settlement was dedicated in 1766; however, this is linguistically unlikely. Compare also Ustje in the Municipality of Ig.

== History ==
The oldest monument in the village is the 17th-century church, built on a small hill dedicated to John the Evangelist. Ruins of walls indicate that the site must have been used as a fortification during Ottoman raids.

Ustje after August 8, 1942

On August 8, 1942, Italian soldiers of the Julia division killed eight people and burned down the village. After the war, the village was rebuilt and August 8 is observed as a memorial day. The events from 1942 are described in Danilo Lokar's book Sodni dan na vasi (Doomsday in the Village).

=== Mass grave ===
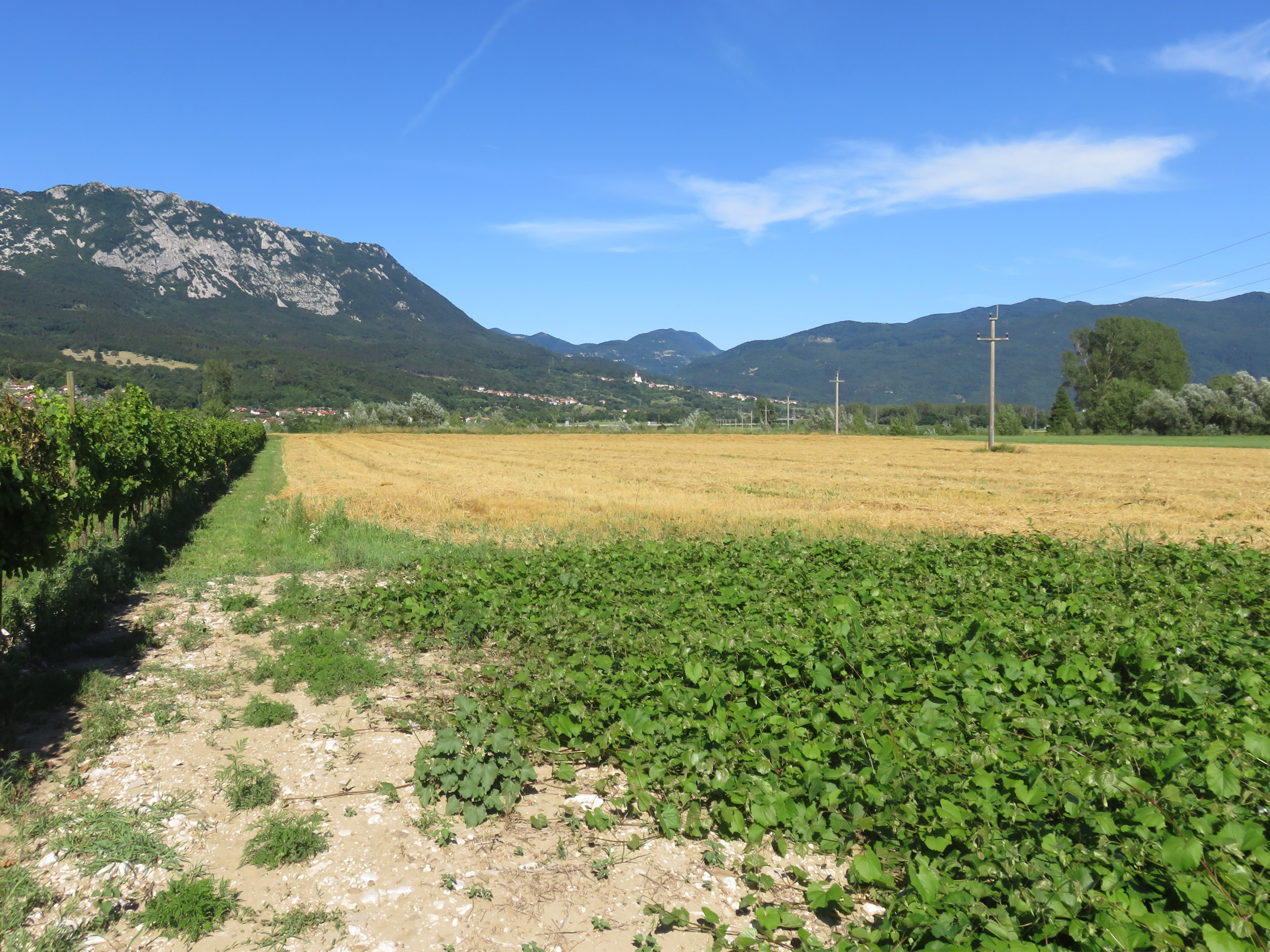
Ajdov Field Mass Grave site

Ustje is the site of a mass grave associated with the Second World War. The Ajdov Field Mass Grave (Slovene: Grobišče Ajdovsko polje) is located in a meadow and a field 110 m south of a waste treatment facility, between a field road and Hubelj Creek. In March 2002, investigators disinterred 67 skeletons from the site, identified as the remains of 15 German and 52 Italian soldiers.

== Church ==
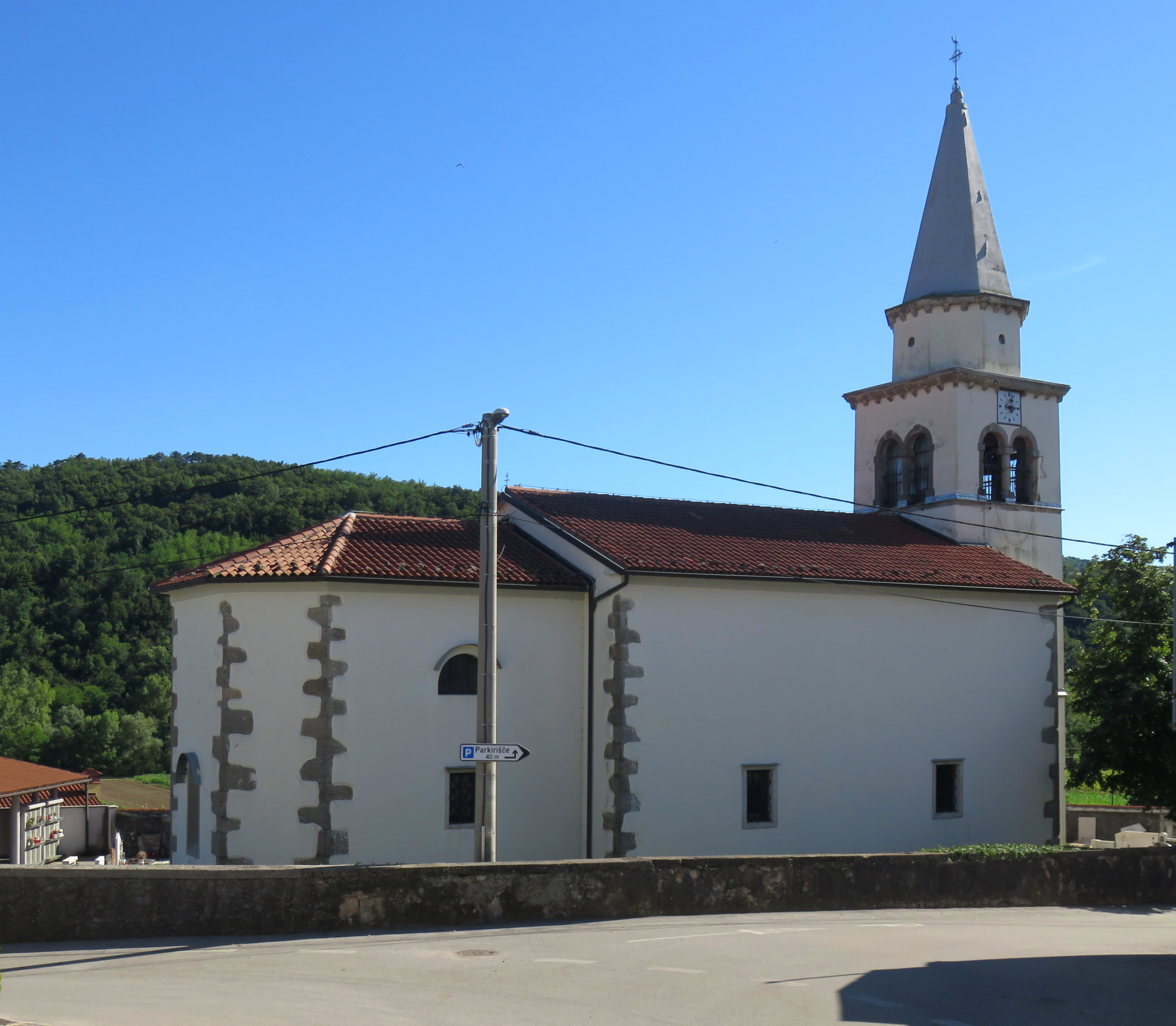
Saint Justus's Church

The parish church in Ustje is dedicated to Saint Justus. It received its present appearance in 1766, at which time it was also dedicated to the saint. The church has an octagonal chancel walled on five sides, a rectangular nave, and a belltower. Its furnishings are in the Baroque style.
