= ISCA =

ISCA or Isca may refer to:

ISCA, a four letter abbreviation which may be one of:

- ISCABBS, a bulletin board system at the University of Iowa
- Indian Science Congress Association
- International Sea Cadet Association
- Islamic Supreme Council of America
- International Symposium on Computer Architecture
- International Scouting Collectors Association
- International Speech Communication Association
- International Sport and Culture Association
- Institute of Singapore Chartered Accountants
- International Society of Caricature Artists
- International Society of Copier Artists
- Israeli Students Combating Antisemitism
- Infrastructure Sustainability Council of Australia
- International Security Conference on Africa

Isca, any of several places in Roman Britain, derived from a Brythonic word for "flowing water":

- Isca Dumnoniorum, modern Exeter
- Isca Augusta, modern Caerleon

- Isca, the River Usk

Isca, a place in Calabria, Italy:

- Isca sullo Ionio
- Isca Marina

Other meanings:

- Isca, a village in Meteș Commune, Alba County, Romania
- Alternate transliteration of Iscah, daughter of Haran
- Isca Academy
- Isca Hockey Club
- Isca the Unbeaten, Marvel Comics character

== See also ==
- Iska (disambiguation)
