= Gornji Ig =

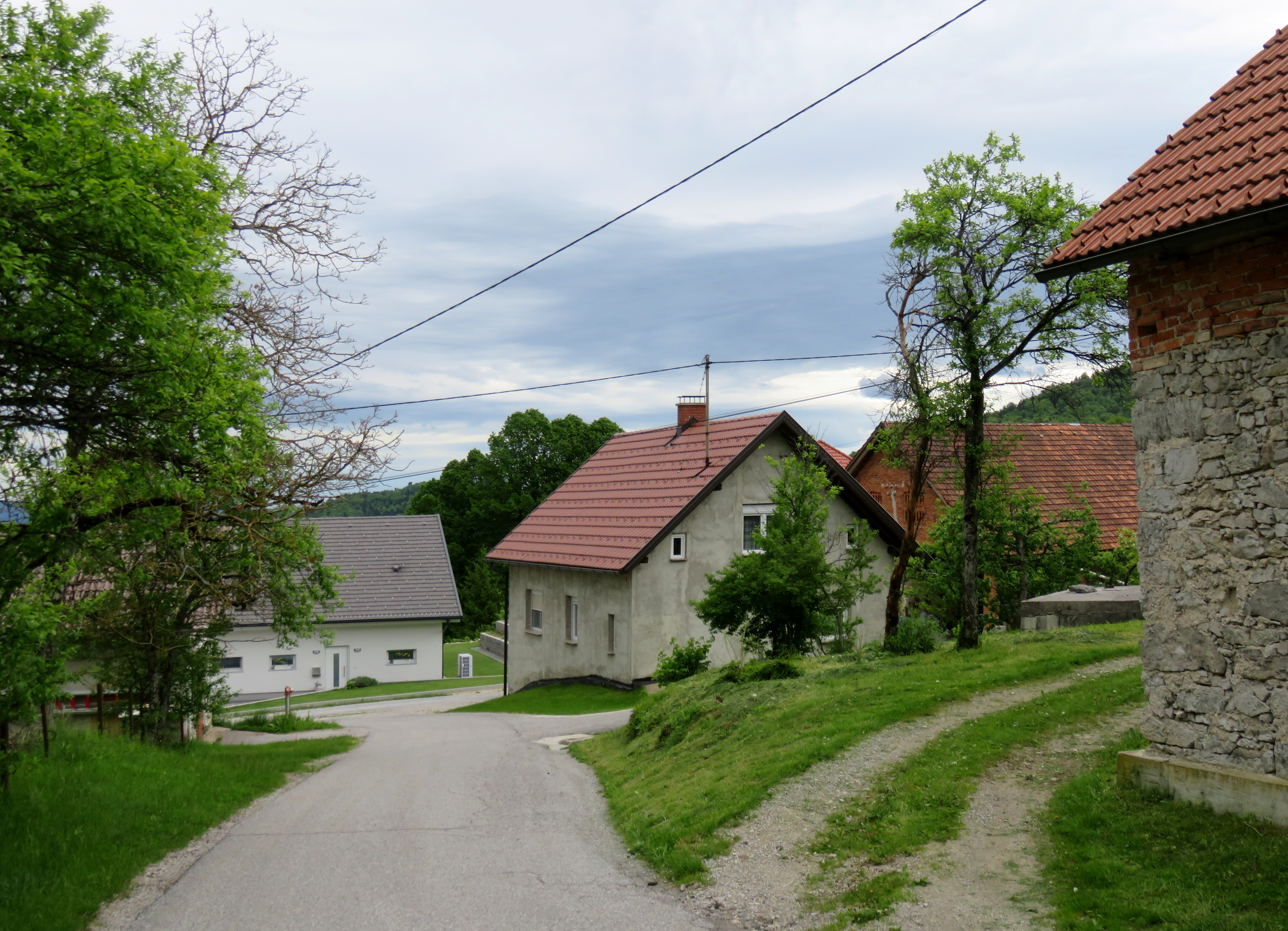

- Location in Slovenia
- Coordinates: 45°59′51.28″N 14°30′12.95″E
- Country: Slovenia
- Traditional region: Inner Carniola
- Statistical region: Central Slovenia
- Municipality: Ig

Area
  - Total: 5.2 km^{2} (2.0 sq mi)
- Elevation: 288.3 m (946 ft)

Population (2002)
  - Total: 278
- Postal code: 1292

Gornji Ig (pronounced [ˈɡoːɾnji ˈiːk]; in older sources also Gorenji Ig, German: Oberigg) is a village in the hills southwest of Iška Vas in the Municipality of Ig in central Slovenia. The entire municipality is part of the traditional region of Inner Carniola and is now included in the Central Slovenia Statistical Region.

== Name ==
The name Gornji Ig literally means 'upper Ig', referring to its location above the Ig area. Gornji Ig was attested in historical sources as Ober Yg in 1300, Ober Ig in 1444, and Oberygdorff in 1493, among other spellings.

== Church ==
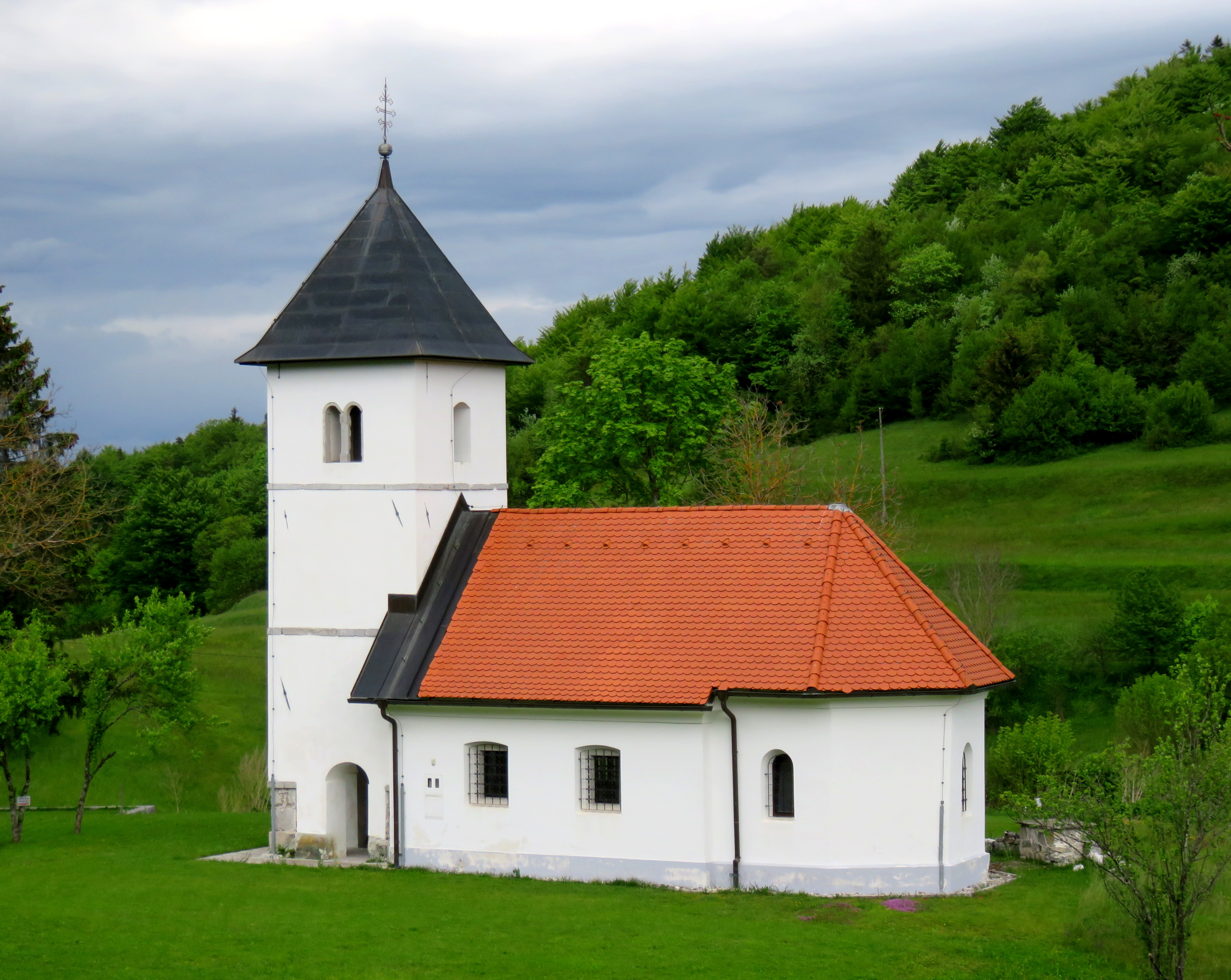
Saint Leonard's Church

The local church, built on a slight elevation north of the settlement, is dedicated to Saint Leonard and belongs to the Parish of Ig. It was a medieval church that was destroyed by Italian artillery on July 16, 1942. The postwar communist authorities prevented it from being rebuilt and it was left in ruins. It was completely reconstructed in its original form and dimensions between 1997 and 1998, in time for the 500th anniversary of its first mention in a written source. The door casing bears the inscription "1498 IHS 1998."

== Mass grave ==
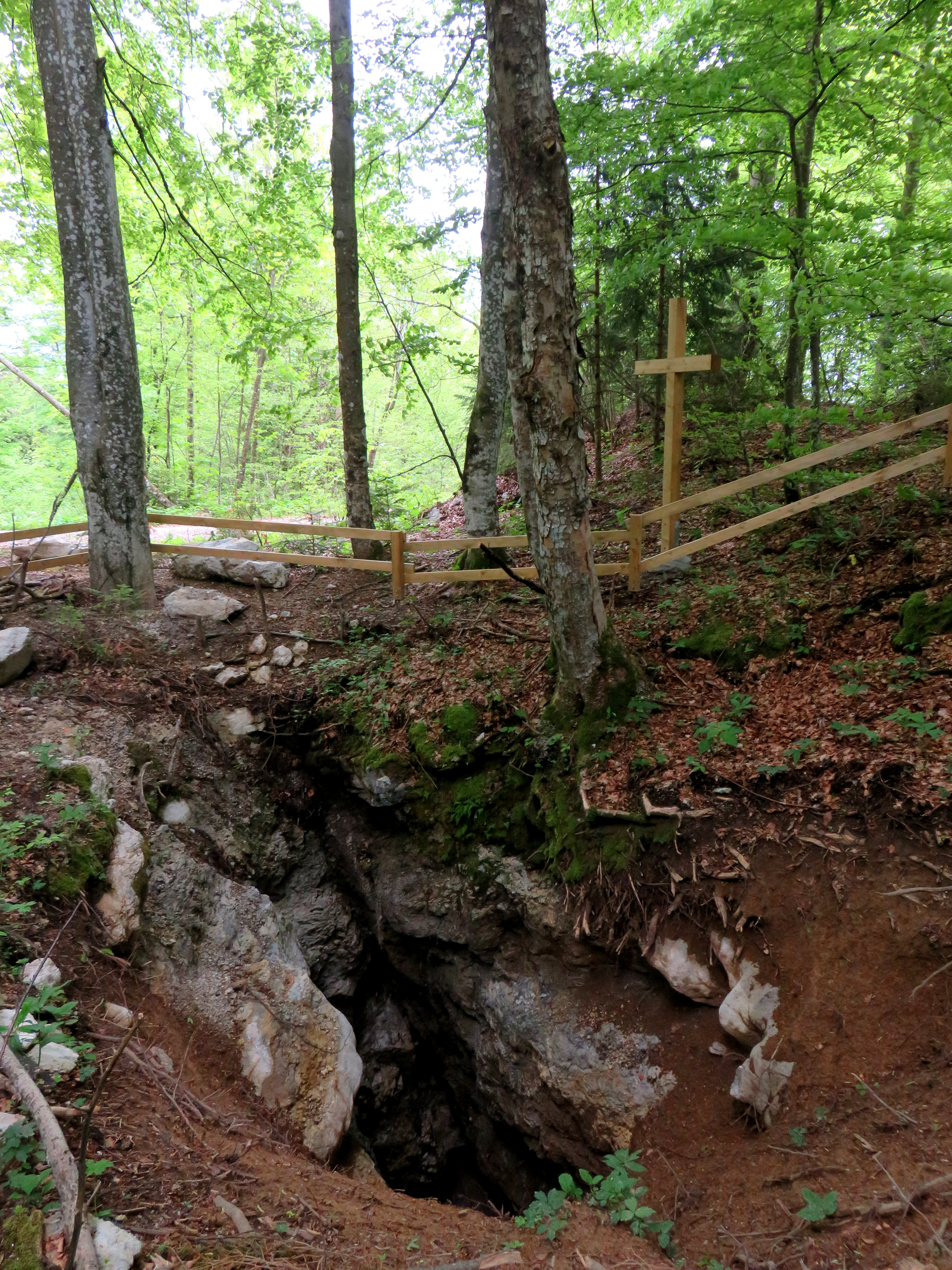
Kosec Shaft Mass Grave

Gornji Ig is the site of a mass grave from the period immediately after the Second World War. The Kosec Shaft Mass Grave (Slovene: Grobišče Koščevo brezno) is located on the southern slope of Mount Krim, about 4 kilometers (2.5 mi) southwest of Gornji Ig, on the left side of the gravel road to Rakitna. It contains the remains of wounded Home Guard soldiers that were murdered in June 1945, as well as 15 to 20 additional civilian victims that had been hiding in Rakitna and were murdered in October 1945.
