= Sekeřice =

- Municipality
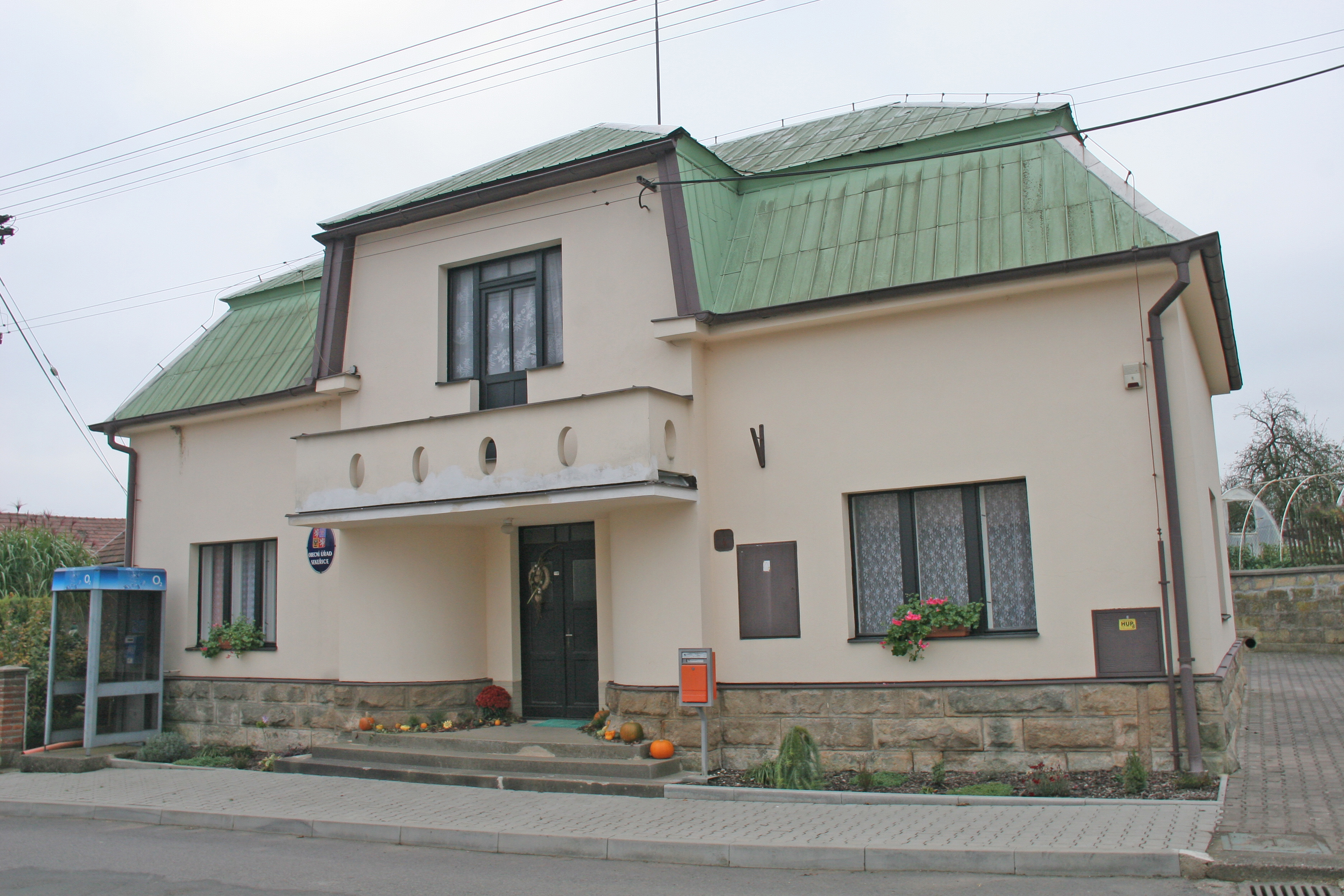
- Municipal office

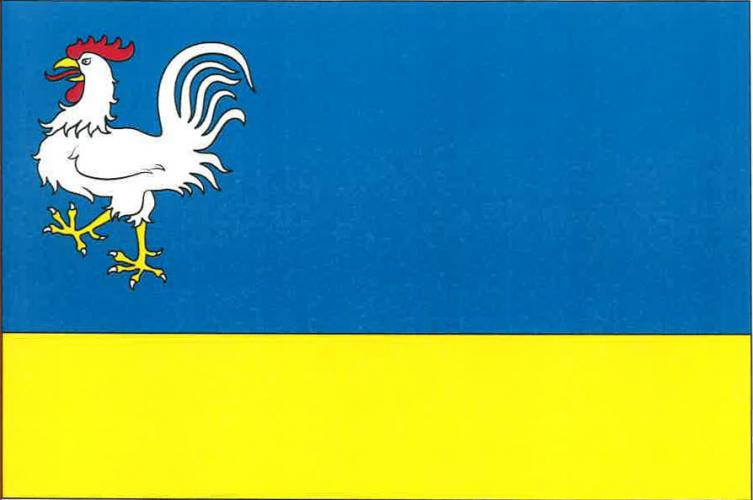
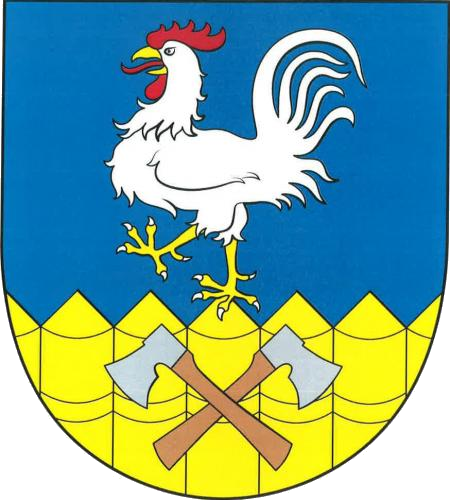
- Flag Coat of arms

- Location in the Czech Republic
- Coordinates: 50°17′11″N 15°22′51″E
- Country: Czech Republic
- Region: Hradec Králové
- District: Jičín
- First mentioned: 1386

Area
  - Total: 3.19 km^{2} (1.23 sq mi)
- Elevation: 274 m (899 ft)

Population (2026-01-01)
  - Total: 121
  - Density: 37.9/km^{2} (98.2/sq mi)
- Time zone: UTC+1 (CET)
  - Summer (DST): UTC+2 (CEST)
- Postal code: 507 03
- Website: www.sekerice.cz

Sekeřice is a municipality and village in Jičín District in the Hradec Králové Region of the Czech Republic. It has about 100 inhabitants.

== Demographics ==
Historical population
Year	Pop.	±%
1869	415	—
1880	437	+5.3%
1890	475	+8.7%
1900	430	−9.5%
1910	416	−3.3%
1921	410	−1.4%
1930	364	−11.2%
1950	334	−8.2%
1961	297	−11.1%
1970	245	−17.5%
1980	179	−26.9%
1991	140	−21.8%
2001	116	−17.1%
2011	108	−6.9%
2021	116	+7.4%
Source: Censuses
