= Israeli Students Combating Antisemitism =

Israeli Students combating antisemitism (ISCA) online has been founded in 2011 and operates with the purpose of fighting the growing antisemitism, xenophobia and Holocaust denial on the internet.

== About the program ==
Israeli Students Combating Antisemitism (ISCA) is one of the world's leading initiatives for combating antisemitism, Holocaust denial & racism online, designed by the National Union of Israeli Students. The program trains excelling students to monitor and respond to racist materials distributed online in exchange for academic credits or a scholarship. ISCA is a member of the International Network Against Cyber Hate (INACH) and is taking an active role in shaping a civil discourse online together with NGO's and human rights organizations. Tens of students from various academic institutions in Israel participate each year in the program. The students operate on various social media platforms, monitoring content on more than 10 languages, including answering questions regarding the Jewish nation, Holocaust, Jewish history and reporting antisemitic questions published on social media.

The students operate in three teams: monitoring, Yahoo answers and new media. The monitoring team overseas reporting and removing antisemitic content in the following social media platforms: Facebook, Instagram, Twitter, YouTube and Vikontakte (Russian social media), monitoring content on more than 10 languages. The Yahoo Answers team includes students answering questions asked by Yahoo users regarding the Jewish nation, Holocaust, Jewish history etc. In addition, students report antisemitic questions published on the website. The new media team oversees the ongoing operation in different social media platforms: Facebook pages (English, French and Portuguese), Twitter (English and French), a YouTube channel and an Instagram account.

The program is leading in its field due to its special nature and operation and is appreciated by many countries. The program for combating antisemitism online is the biggest in the world for monitoring antisemitic content online and in the most languages, compared to other NGO's in the field. The program corporate with human rights organizations and NGO’S such as Yad Vashem, ADL, Kantor Center, INACH and more. The program was closed in November 2018. The last program director was Tomer Aldubi.

== History ==
The program for combating antisemitism online is the biggest in the world for monitoring antisemitic content online and in the most languages, compared to other NGO's in the field. As part of the program's cooperation with various organizations, its representatives regularly participate in committees in the Knesset and in conferences around the world. In 2017 representatives participated in OSCE – a youth conference in Spain. In 2018, the program shared experiences of fighting antisemitism online at a special panel at the Global forum for antisemitism, organized by the Israeli Ministry for Foreign Affairs. In 2014, the Academic Program for Combating Antisemitism was established at the Interdisciplinary Center (IDC) in Herzliya, to channel the program's activities to the academia. The program grants credit to around 30 students every year for academic training and two-semester activities. The academic program encourages students, both Jewish and non-Jewish, to initiate a personal project to eradicate the phenomenon of hatred on the Internet.

== Achievements ==
Part of the achievements of the program over the years: On Facebook, monitoring over 21,000 antisemitic and Holocaust deniers, with an average removal rate of 44%. On Twitter, monitoring more than 17,000 accounts with an average removal rate of 60%. On YouTube, monitoring more than 6,000 videos with an average removal rate of 41%. On Instagram, monitoring more than 8,000 accounts and pictures with an average removal rate of 90%. On Yahoo Answers and Quora, answered over 3,000 questions.

== Conferences ==
- 2017 representatives participated in OSCE – a youth conference in Spain.
- 2018 – Participated at the Global Forum for Antisemitism in Jerusalem, Israel

== Press coverage ==
- Jews Down Under, 12.05.14
- Times of Israel, 04.01.2015
- BBC, 05.03.2015
- Algemeiner, 13.05.2015
- Jewish News Online, 27.01.2016
- The Louis D. Brandies Center, 28.01.2016
- I24 news, 25.04.2017

== Partners ==
- ADL
- INACH
- WJC
- CRIF
- NGO Monitor
- CST
- SAJBD
- Online Hate Prevention Institute
- Kantor Center
- Simon Wiesenthal Center
- Yad Vashem
- Jewish Agency for Israel
