= Iška Vas =

- Village
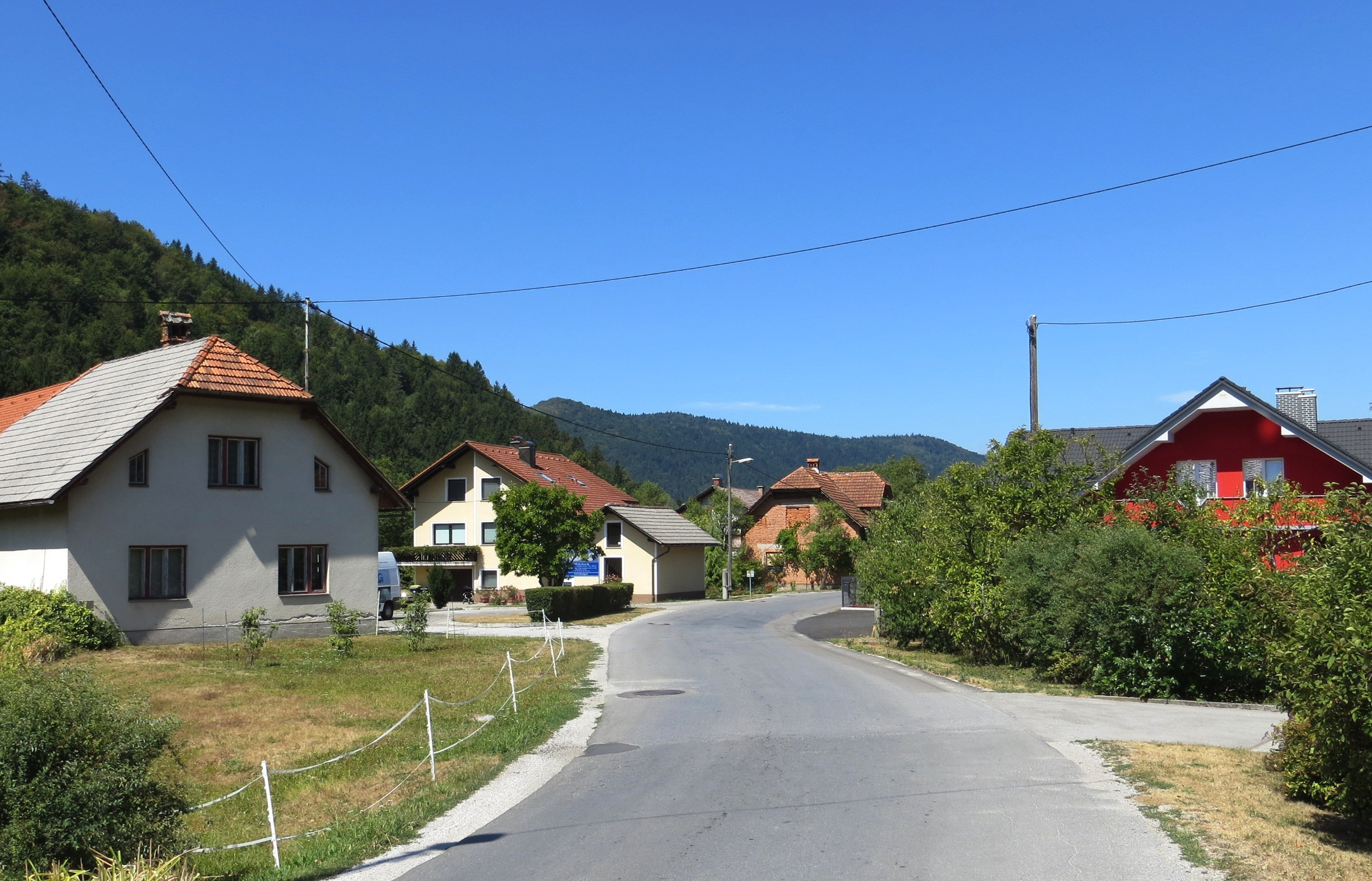

- Location in Slovenia
- Coordinates: 45°56′22.49″N 14°30′45.45″E
- Country: Slovenia
- Traditional region: Inner Carniola
- Statistical region: Central Slovenia
- Municipality: Ig

Area
  - Total: 1.86 km^{2} (0.72 sq mi)
- Elevation: 325.3 m (1,067 ft)

Population (2002)
  - Total: 356
- Postal code: 1292

Iška Vas (pronounced [ˈiːʃka ˈʋaːs]; Slovene: Iška vas, German: Iggdorf) is a village on the right bank of the Iška River in the Municipality of Ig in central Slovenia, just south of the capital Ljubljana. The entire municipality is part of the traditional region of Inner Carniola and is now included in the Central Slovenia Statistical Region.

== Name ==
The name Iška vas literally means 'village in the Ig region', derived from the adjective form *Ižьska(ja). The settlement was attested in written sources in 1352 as in der Eysch, and in 1484 as dorff Aisch. In the past the German name was Iggdorf.

== Churches ==
There are two churches in the settlement. To the east of the main settlement core is the church dedicated to Saint Michael. It was first mentioned in written documents dating to the early 14th century and contains 16th-century frescos and a lapidarium of mostly Roman tombstones. The second church is built on a slight hill north of the settlement. It is dedicated to the Holy Cross. Both belong to the Parish of Ig.

== Gallery ==
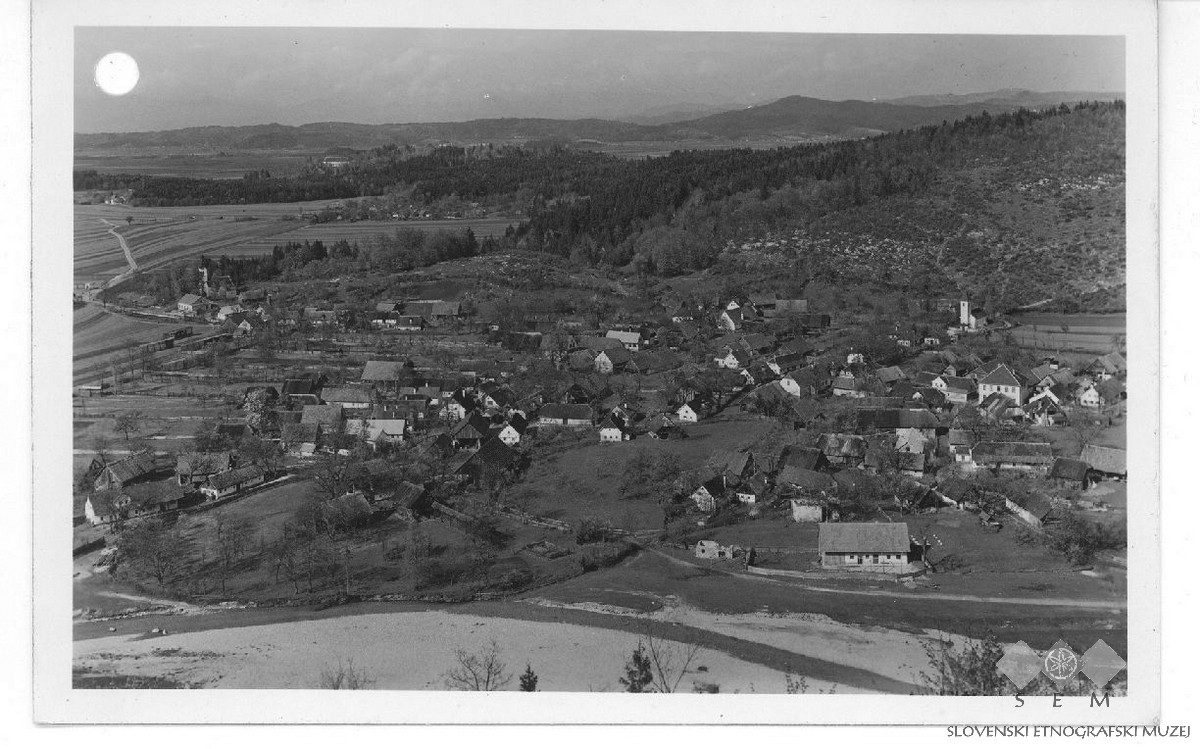
Iška Vas, ca. 1928–1947
