= Ig, Ig =

Ig
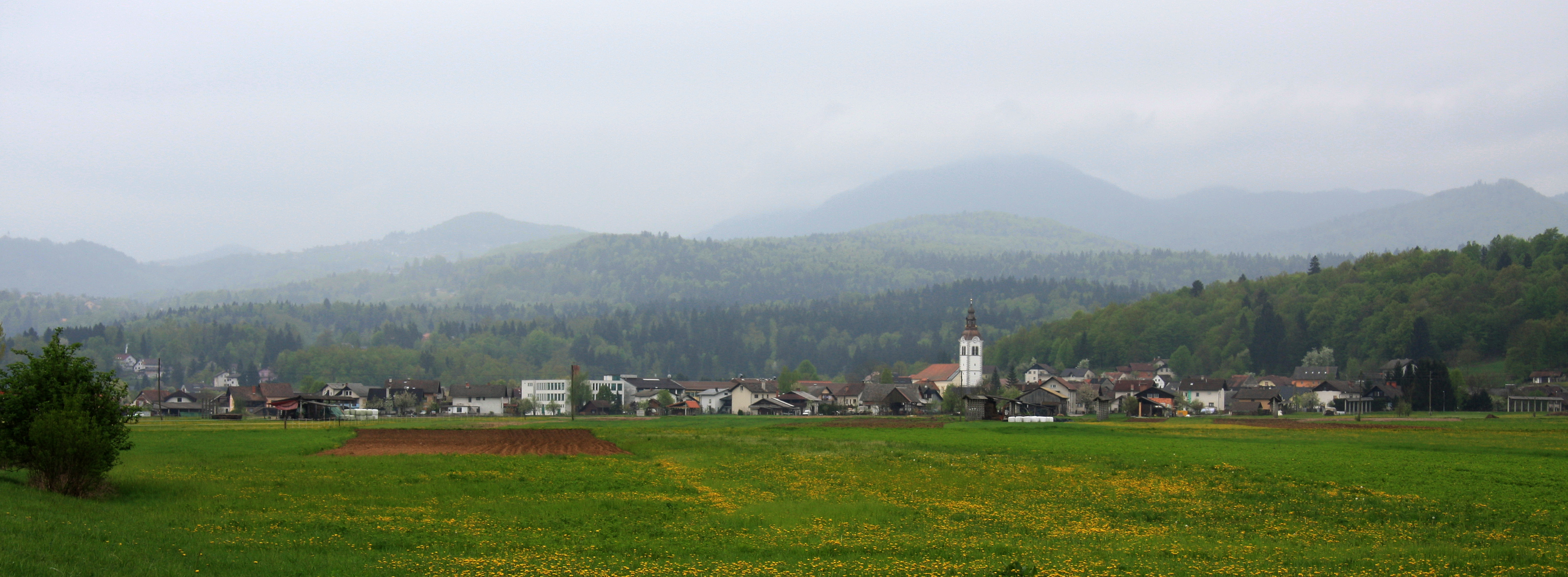

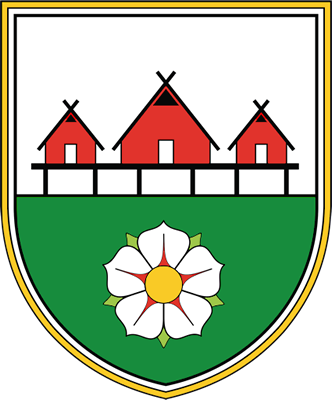
- Coat of arms

- Location in Slovenia
- Coordinates: 45°58′9.09″N 14°32′21.72″E
- Country: Slovenia
- Traditional region: Inner Carniola
- Statistical region: Central Slovenia
- Municipality: Ig

Area
  - Total: 12.1 km^{2} (4.7 sq mi)
- Elevation: 288.8 m (948 ft)

Population (2012)
  - Total: 2,240
- Postal code: 1292 Ig

Ig (pronounced [ˈiːk]; formerly Studenec, German: Brunndorf) is the largest settlement and the seat of the Municipality of Ig, central Slovenia.

== Name ==
The name Ig was first attested in 1249 as Yge (and as Ighe, Iglem, and Iglom in 1261, Yg in 1262, and Hyco and Hyc in 1299). During the Middle Ages, Ig was a regional name, and the settlement now known as Ig was called Studenec until the beginning of the 20th century. The etymology of the name Ig is unclear. It may be connected with the Slovene common noun igo 'yoke' (in reference to the course of the Iška River), or to the Slovene common noun iva 'goat willow' (through borrowing into and then from German), or it may derive from a pre-Slavic substratum.

== History ==
After the Second World War, a Yugoslav labor camp for political prisoners operated in Ig.

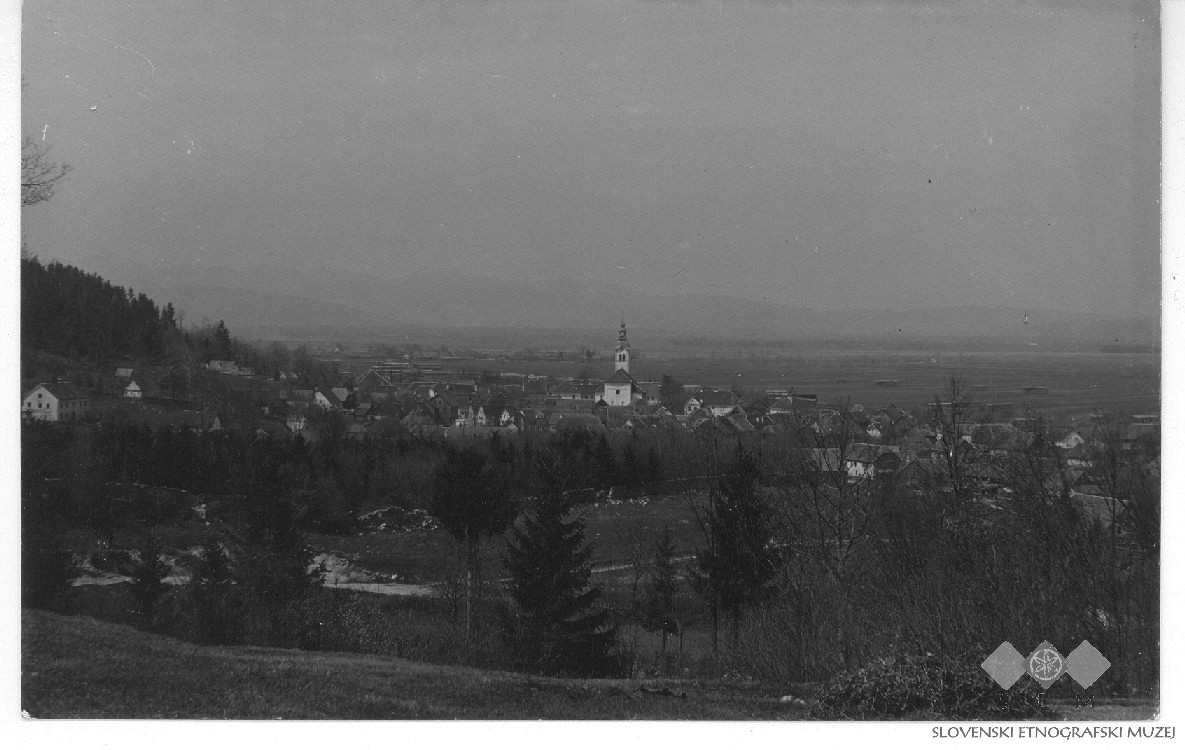
Postcard of Ig

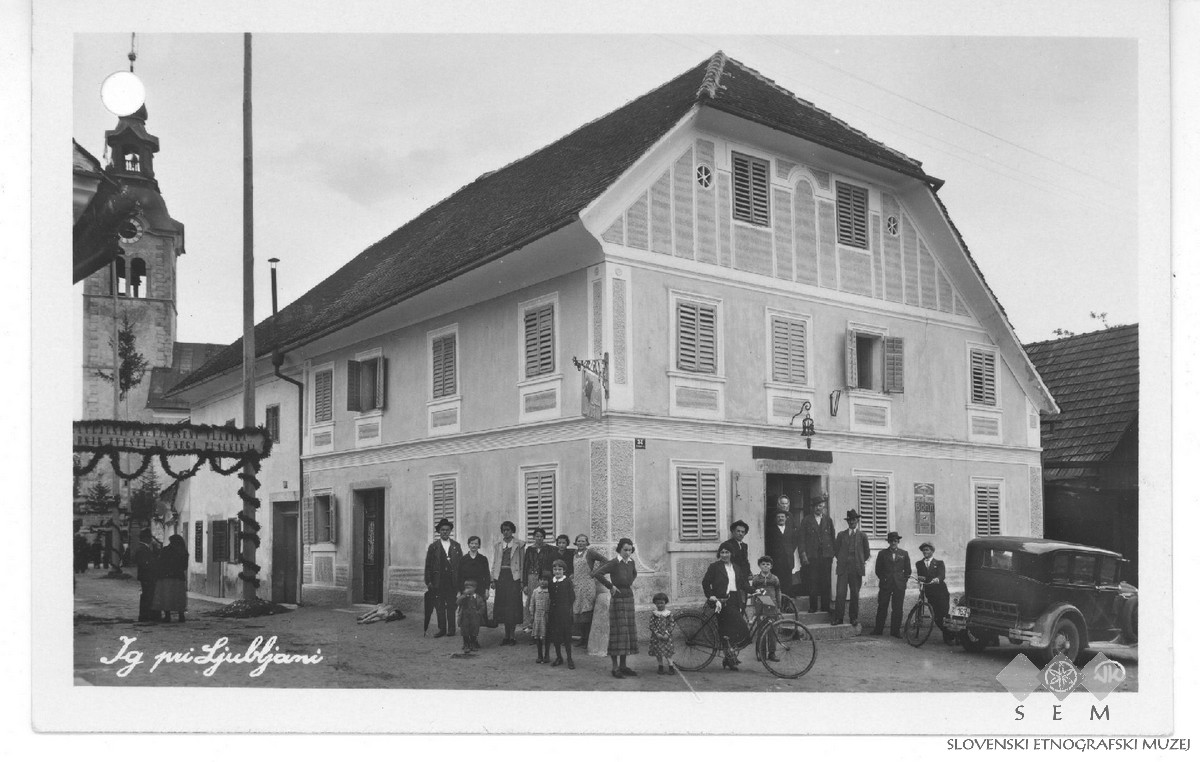
Postcard of Ig

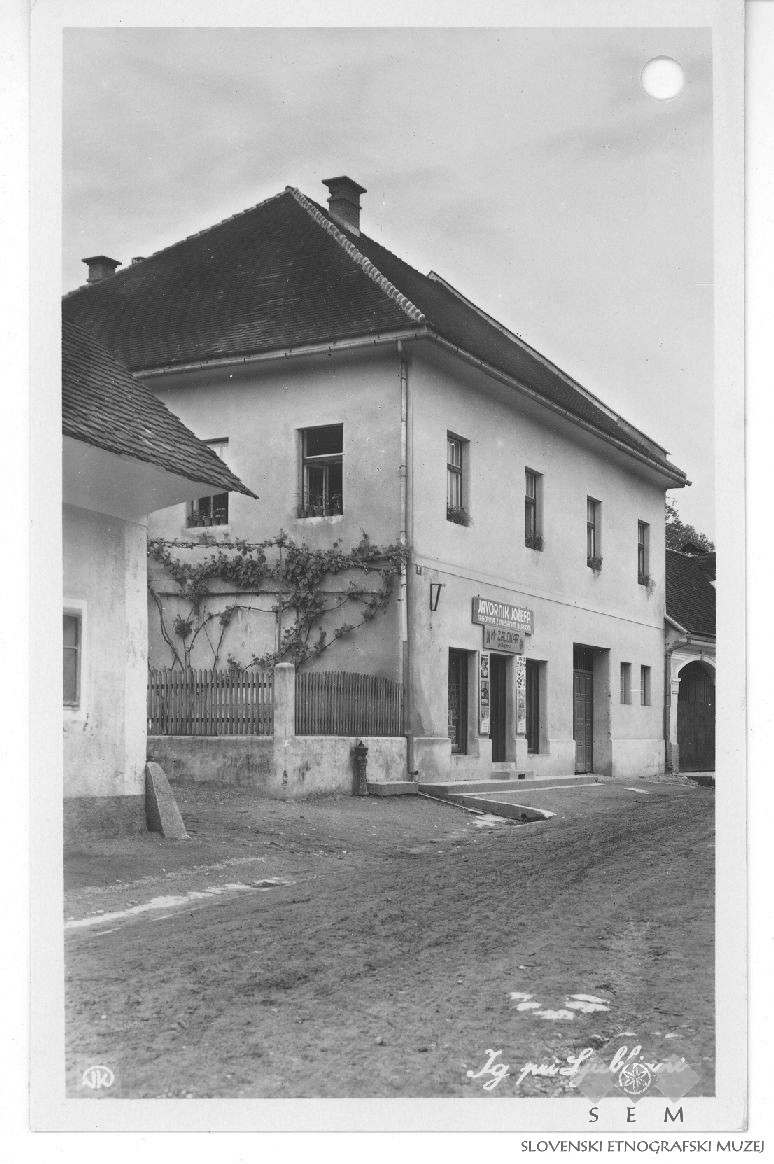
Postcard of Ig

== Landmarks ==
=== Parish church ===
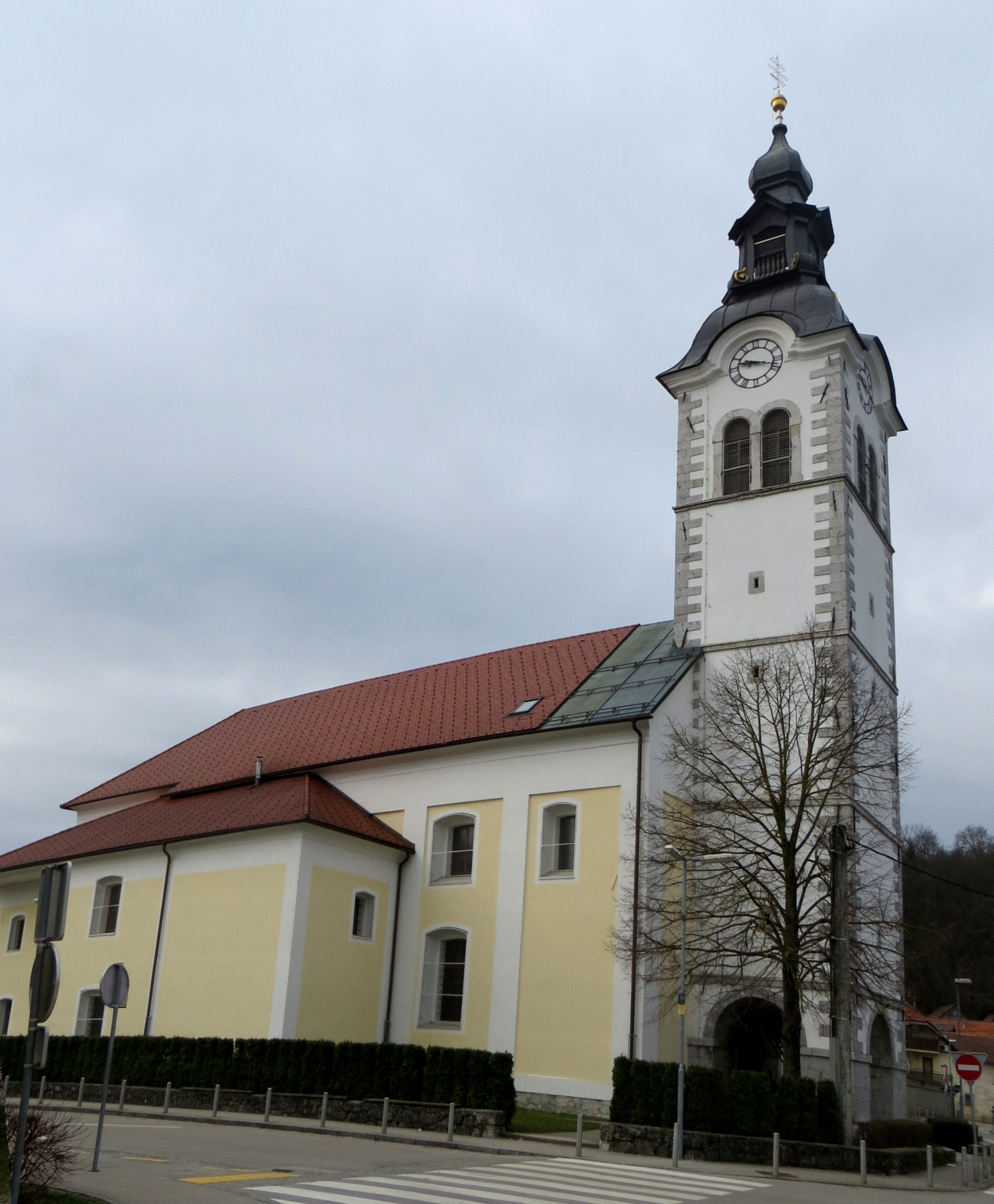
Saint Martin's Church

The parish church in Ig is dedicated to Saint Martin and belongs to the Roman Catholic Archdiocese of Ljubljana. It was built in 1780. The painting of Saint Martin in the church is a work by Josip Egartner. A second church, built on Pungrt Hill west of the main settlement, is a 14th-century building, now in ruins. It was dedicated to Saint George.

=== World Heritage Site ===
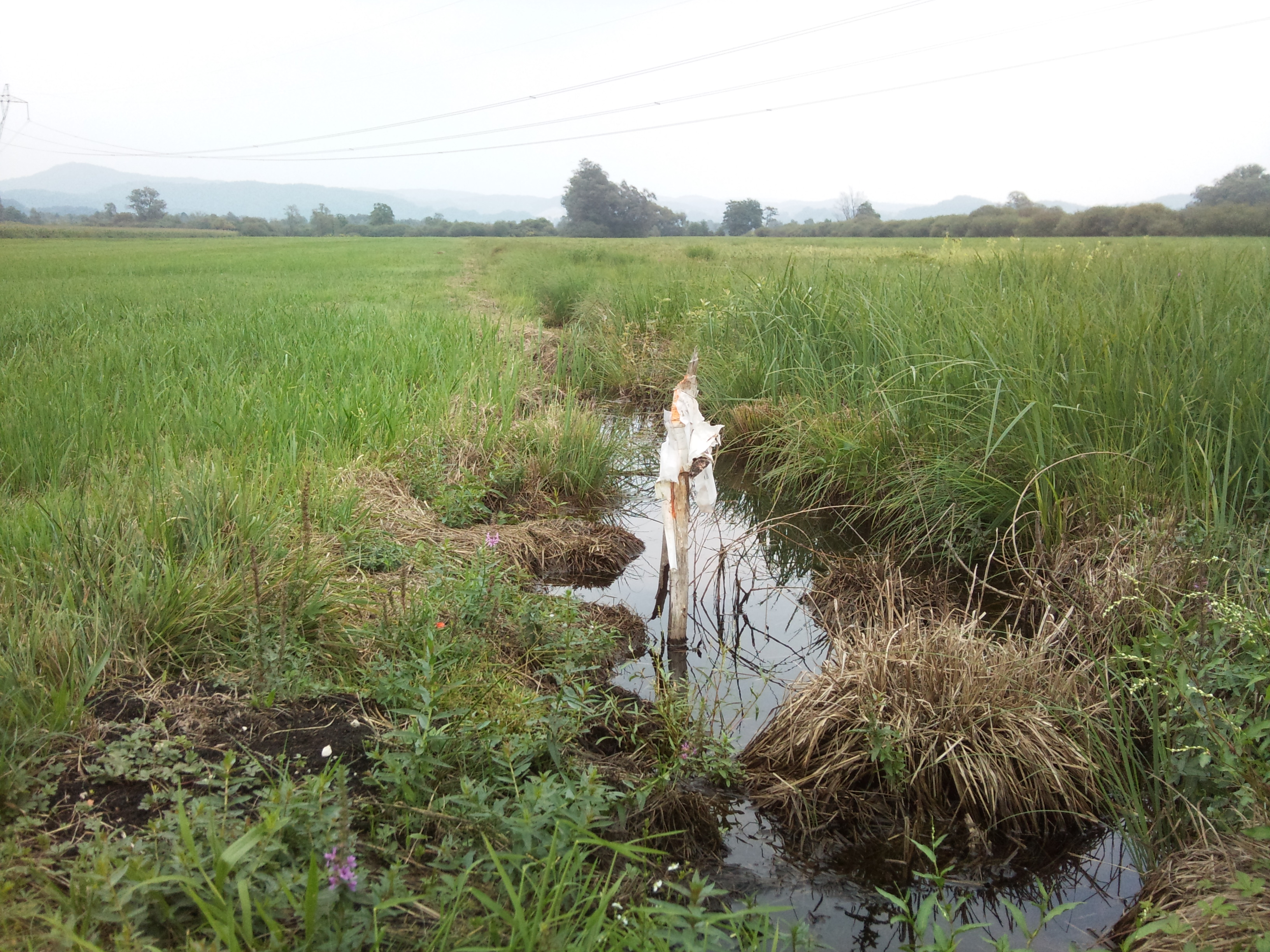
Site of the remains of the pile-dwellings

In the vicinity of Ig, the remains of prehistoric pile-dwelling (or stilt house) settlements, since 2011 protected as part of the Prehistoric Pile dwellings around the Alps UNESCO World Heritage Site.
