= Krvava Peč =

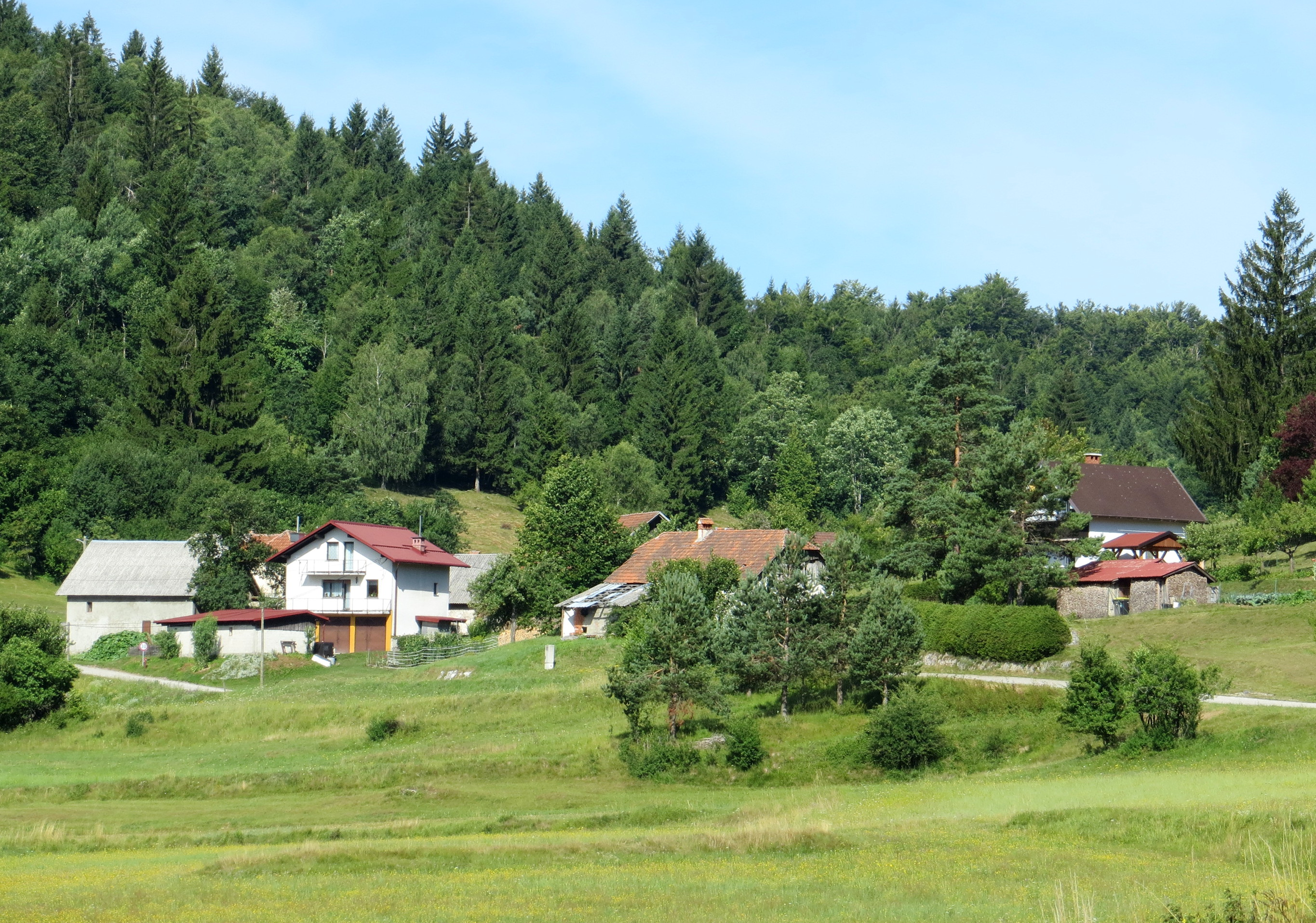

- Location in Slovenia
- Coordinates: 45°51′50.09″N 14°30′50.14″E
- Country: Slovenia
- Traditional region: Lower Carniola
- Statistical region: Central Slovenia
- Municipality: Velike Lašče

Area
  - Total: 6.4 km^{2} (2.5 sq mi)
- Elevation: 731.9 m (2,401 ft)

Population (2002)
  - Total: 26
- Postal code: 1315

Krvava Peč (pronounced [kəɾˈʋaːʋa ˈpeːtʃ]; German: Blutigenstein) is a village in the hills west of Velike Lašče in central Slovenia. The entire Municipality of Velike Lašče is part of the traditional region of Lower Carniola and is now included in the Central Slovenia Statistical Region.

== Name ==
The name Krvava Peč literally means 'bloody cliff'. The name of the settlement was originally Rožna vas. The current name is said to be based on an incident during an Ottoman attack in which the attackers threw two girls over a nearby cliff to their deaths in the Iška Gorge. In the past the German name was Blutigenstein (literally, 'bloody stone').

== History ==
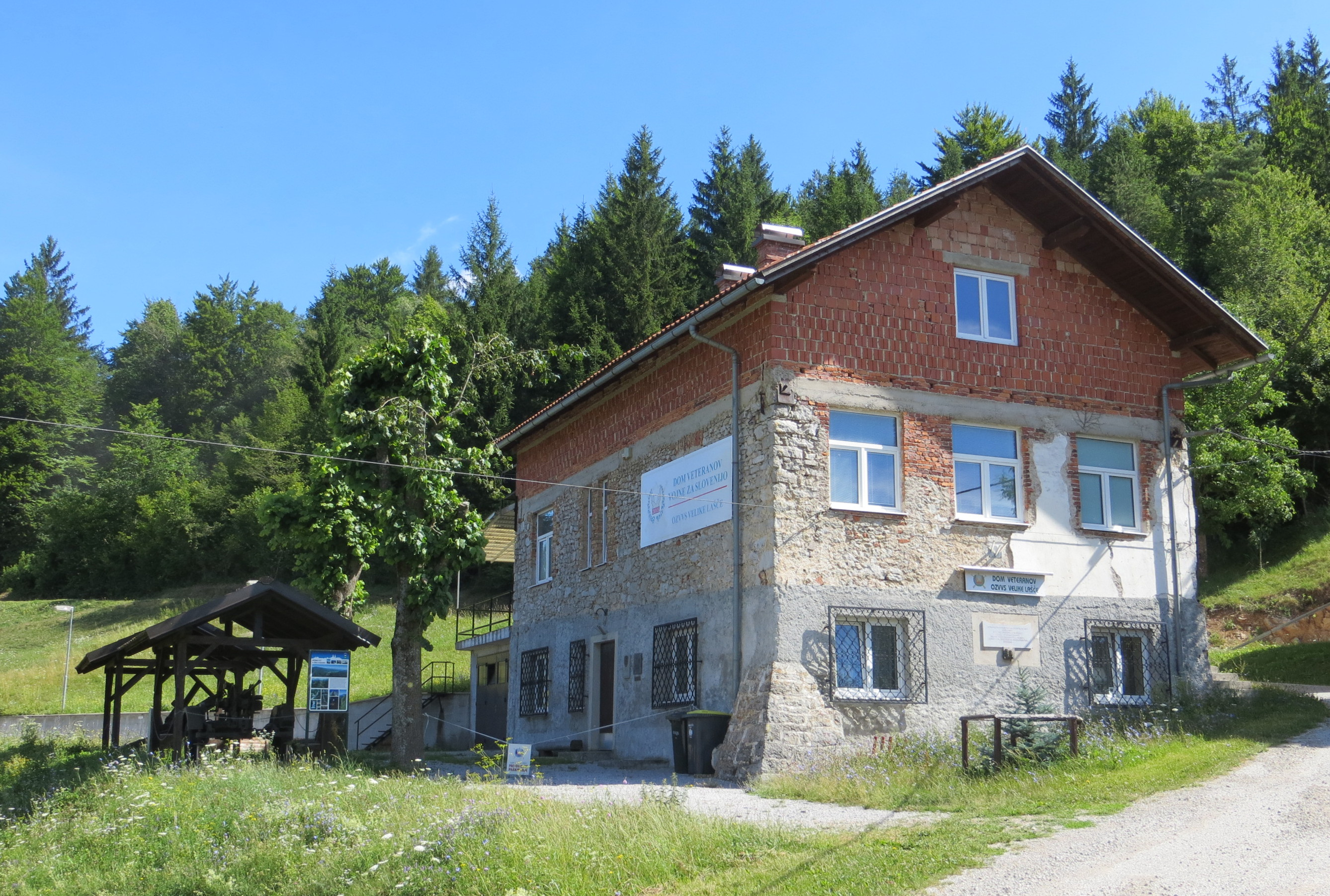
Veterans' lodge

All of the houses in the village burned in 1914 because of a fire started by children. A school was established in 1927. The village was burned by Italian forces during the Second World War on 22 March 1942. After some renovations, the village was burned again on 8 August 1942 and all of the men were arrested and sent to an Italian concentration camp.

During the Ten-Day War in 1991, Krvava Peč served as a collection center for deserters from the Yugoslav Army, including soldiers, NCOs, and officers. The center was overseen by the 63rd Independent Company. Access to the area was controlled by a Slovenian roadblock at Purkače. The building that was used as the headquarters for the collection center is now a lodge operated by the Union of Veterans of the War for Slovenia (ZVVS).

== Church ==
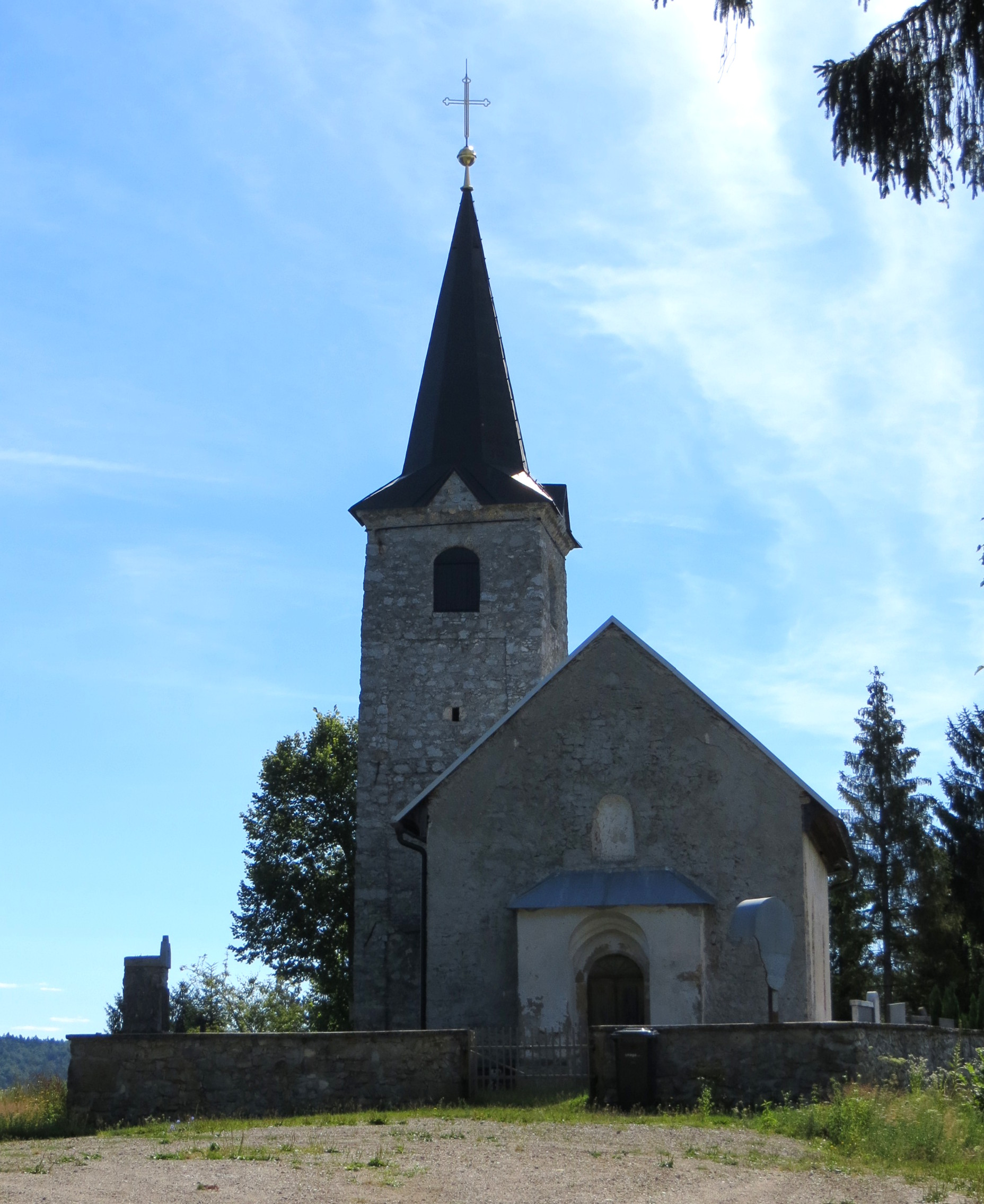
View from west

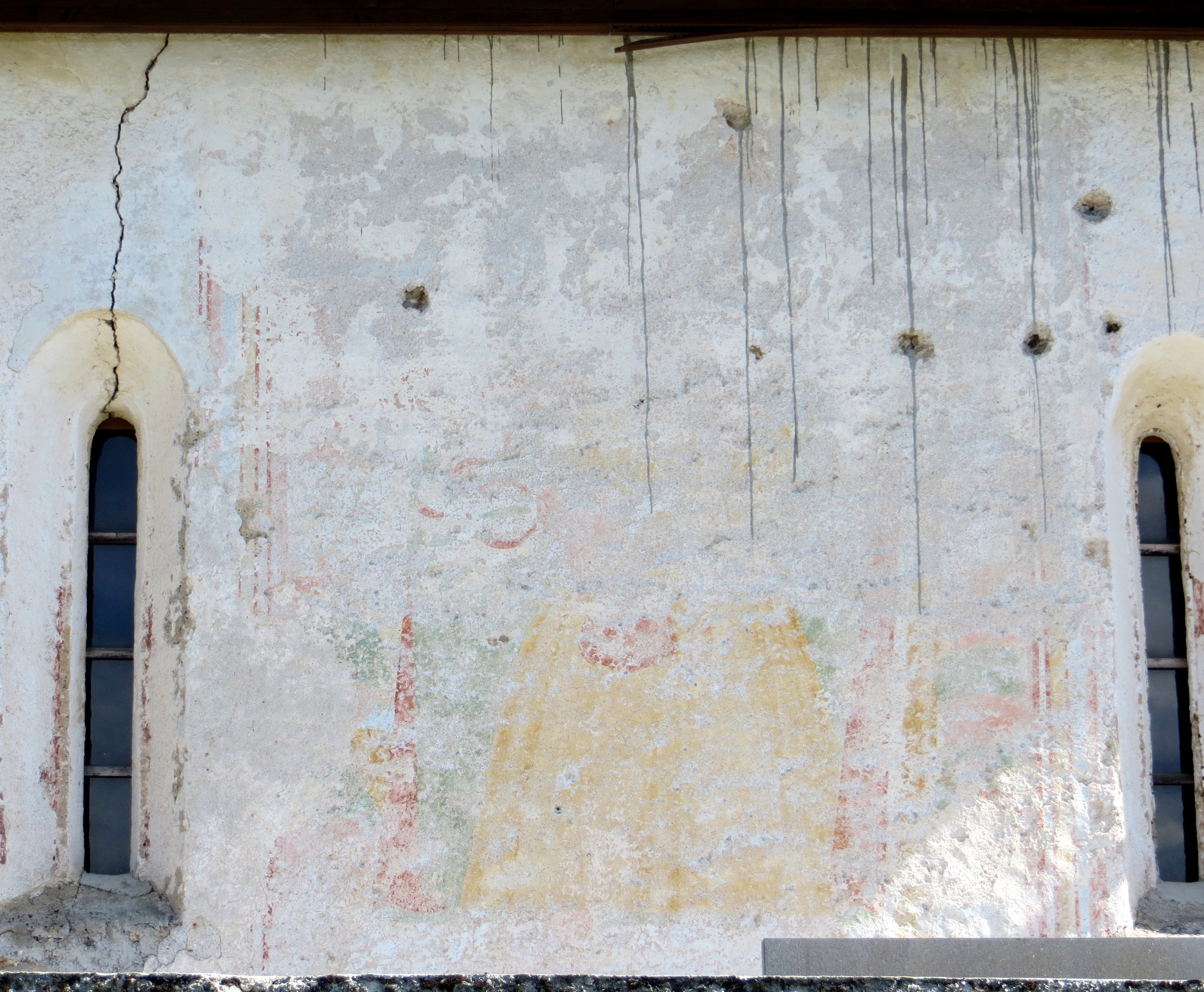
Fresco remnant

Saint Leonard's Church

The local church, on a small hill southwest of the settlement, is dedicated to Saint Leonard and belongs to the Parish of Rob. It is a 16th-century Gothic building with surviving wall paintings. The Baroque belfry was added in 1667.
