= Iška =

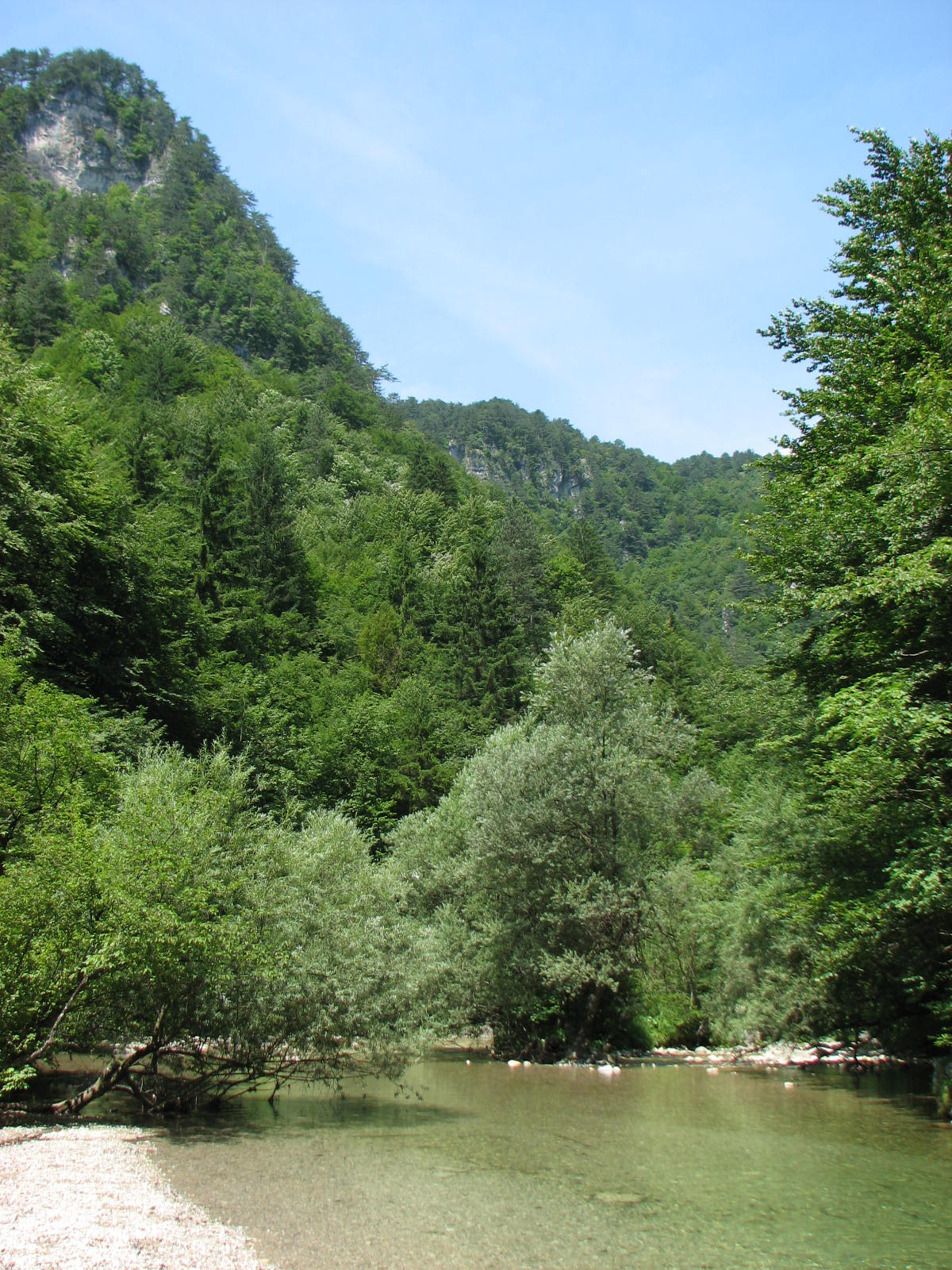
- The Iška Gorge

Location
- Country: Slovenia

Physical characteristics
- Source
  - location: Bloke Plateau
  - elevation: 760 m (2,490 ft)
- Mouth
  - location: Ljubljanica
  - coordinates: 45.9999°N 14.4675°E
  - elevation: 287 m (942 ft)
- Length: 31 km (19 mi)
- Basin size: 86 km^{2} (33 sq mi)

Basin features
- Progression: Ljubljanica→ Sava→ Danube→ Black Sea

The Iška (pronounced [ˈiːʃka]) is a river of central Slovenia. Part of the river valley—the Iška Gorge or Iška Canyon (Slovene: Iški vintgar)—separates Lower Carniola from Inner Carniola. The river is 31 km (19 mi) long. After flowing past Strahomer, the river follows an almost straight line and joins the Ljubljanica River, and therefore belongs to the Sava and Black Sea basins.

== Name ==
The name Iška developed from the denominal adjective *Ižьska(ja) (voda) 'Ig (Creek)', derived from the toponym Ig, which was a regional name during the Middle Ages. The etymology of the name Ig is uncertain. It may be connected with the Slovene common noun igo 'yoke' (referring to the course of the river) or to the Slovene common noun iva 'goat willow' (through borrowing into and then from German), or it may derive from a pre-Slavic substratum.

== History ==
The part of the river between Iška Vas and Strahomer disappeared underground during the 2010 Slovenia floods, on the night of 20 September 2010.
