= Selo nad Polhovim Gradcem =

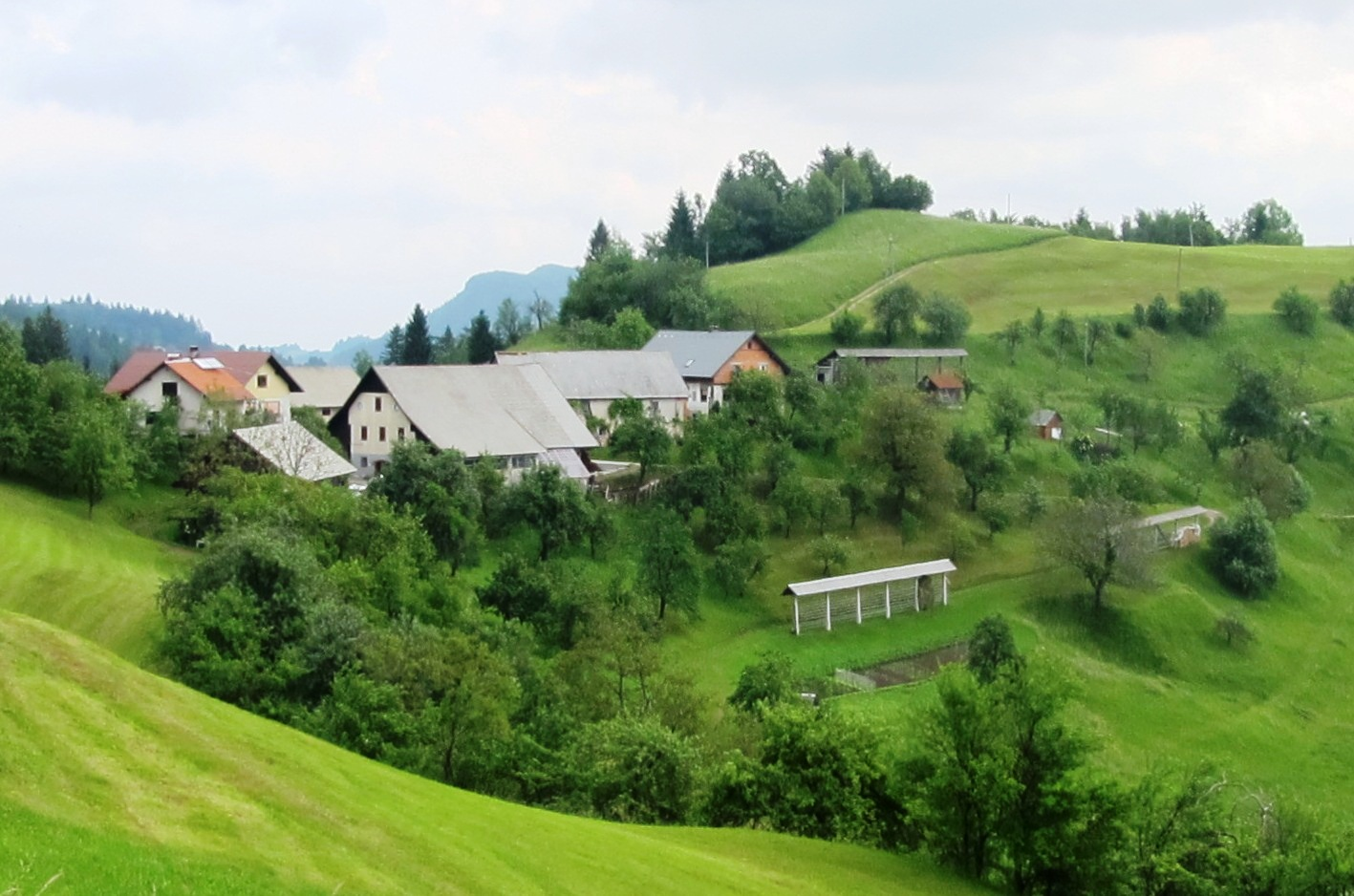

- Location in Slovenia
- Coordinates: 46°5′37.05″N 14°17′22.6″E
- Country: Slovenia
- Traditional region: Upper Carniola
- Statistical region: Central Slovenia
- Municipality: Dobrova–Polhov Gradec

Area
  - Total: 4.16 km^{2} (1.61 sq mi)
- Elevation: 471 m (1,545 ft)

Population (2020)
  - Total: 34
  - Density: 8.2/km^{2} (21/sq mi)

Selo nad Polhovim Gradcem (pronounced [ˈsɛːlɔ nat ˈpou̯ːxoʋim ˈɡɾaːtsɛm]) is a dispersed settlement in the hills above Polhov Gradec in the Municipality of Dobrova–Polhov Gradec in the Upper Carniola region of Slovenia. It lies between the Petač Gorge (Slovene: Petačev graben) with Big Božna Creek to the south and the Hrastnica Valley to the north. It is on a formerly important freight route between Škofja Loka and Polhov Gradec.

== Name ==
The name of the settlement was changed from Selo to Selo nad Polhovim Gradcem in 1955. Selo nad Polhovem Gradcu literally means 'village above Polhov Gradec'. The name Selo is derived from the archaic Slovene common noun selo 'village, settlement'.

== Church ==
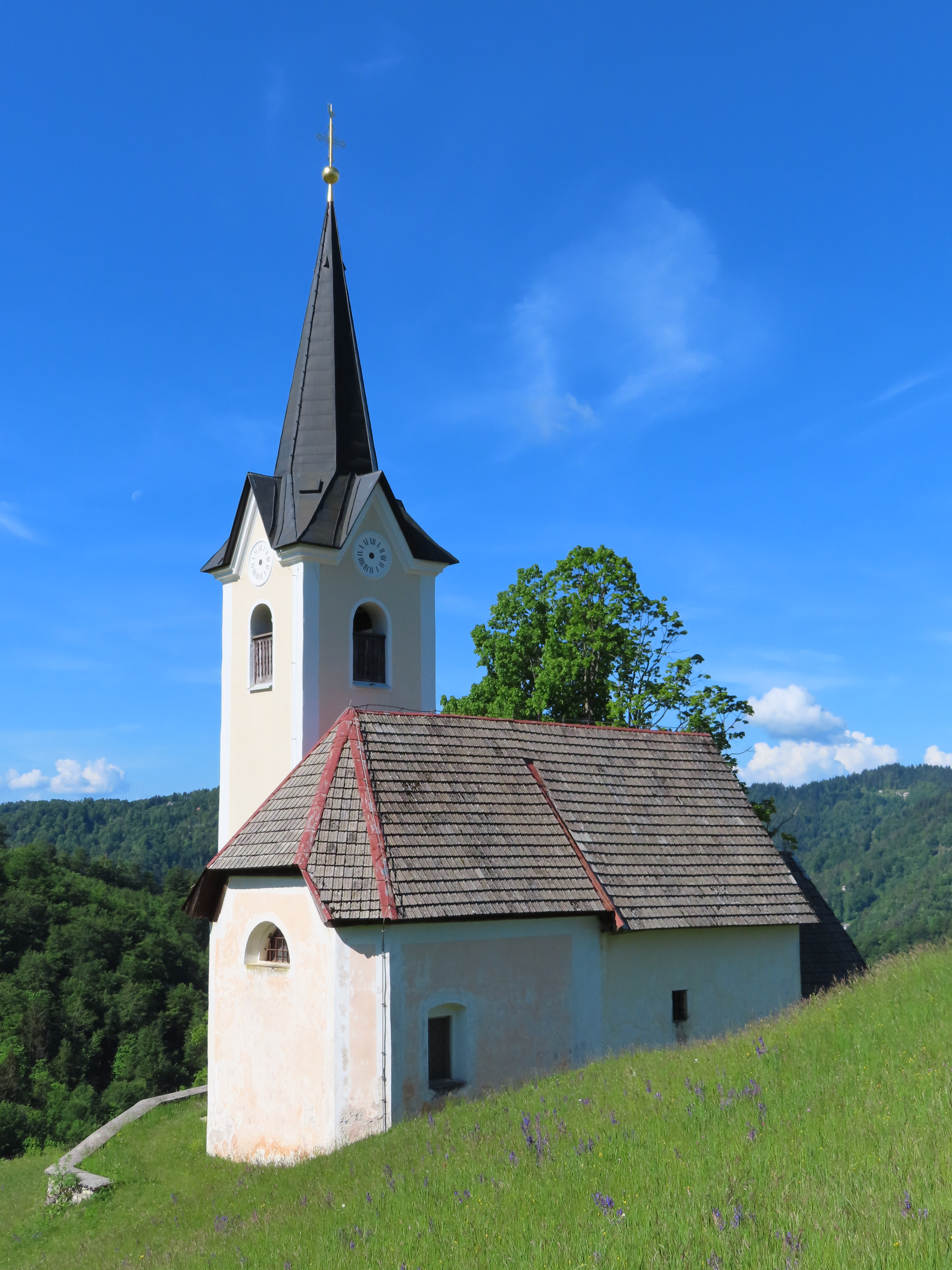
Saint Gertrude's Church

The local church is dedicated to Saint Gertrude and stands on the western slope of Mount Tošč (1021 m). It was first mentioned in documents dating to 1526, but was extensively rebuilt in the mid-18th century, with the bell tower and chancel added in 1756. The previous bell tower is believed to have stood in front of the chancel. The altar dates from about 1800, and the church's painting of Saint Urban and the Pietà were produced by Leopold Layer's school. The bell in the bell tower dates from 1563.
