= Pristava pri Polhovem Gradcu =

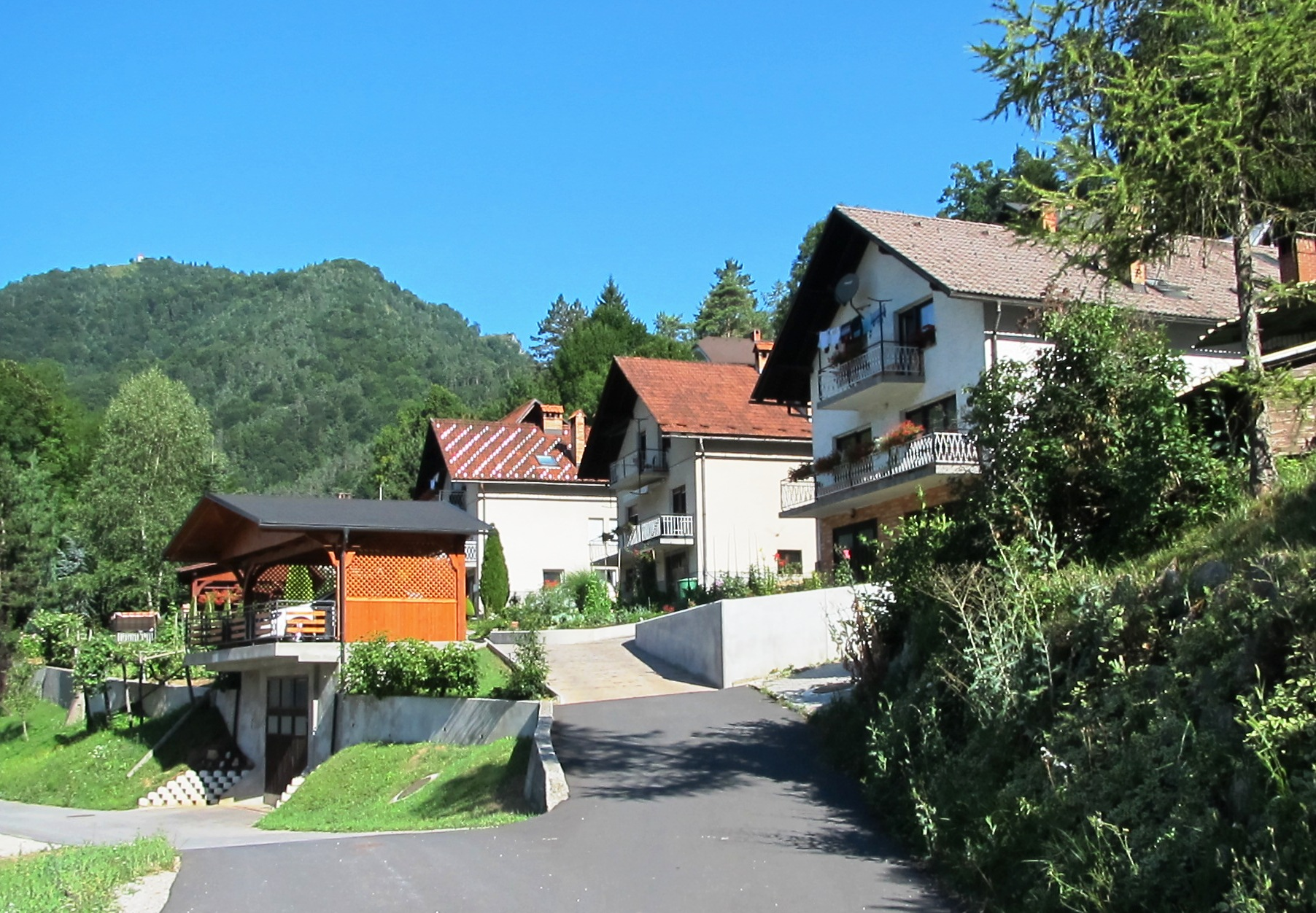

- Location in Slovenia
- Coordinates: 46°3′50.75″N 14°18′59.35″E
- Country: Slovenia
- Traditional region: Upper Carniola
- Statistical region: Central Slovenia
- Municipality: Dobrova–Polhov Gradec

Area
  - Total: 0.77 km^{2} (0.30 sq mi)
- Elevation: 363.7 m (1,193 ft)

Population (2020)
  - Total: 127
  - Density: 160/km^{2} (430/sq mi)

Pristava pri Polhovem Gradcu (pronounced [pɾiˈstaːʋa pɾi ˈpou̯ːxoʋɛm ˈɡɾaːtsu]) is a settlement next to Polhov Gradec in the Municipality of Dobrova–Polhov Gradec in the Upper Carniola region of Slovenia.

== Name ==
The name of the settlement was changed from Pristava to Pristava pri Polhovem Gradcu in 1953. The name Pristava pri Polhovem Gradcu literally means 'manor farm near Polhov Gradec'. The name Pristava comes from the common noun pristava 'manor farm; house with outbuildings and land'. Manor farms were typically found near a manor and were operated by servants of the manor. Settlements with this name and the semantically equivalent Marof are frequent in Slovenia. In the past it was known as Pristawa in German.

== Notable people ==
Notable people that were born or lived in Pristava pri Polhovem Gradcu include:

- Anton Rihar (1819–1894), musical instrument maker
- Gregor Rihar Sr. (1796–1863), musician and composer

== Gallery ==
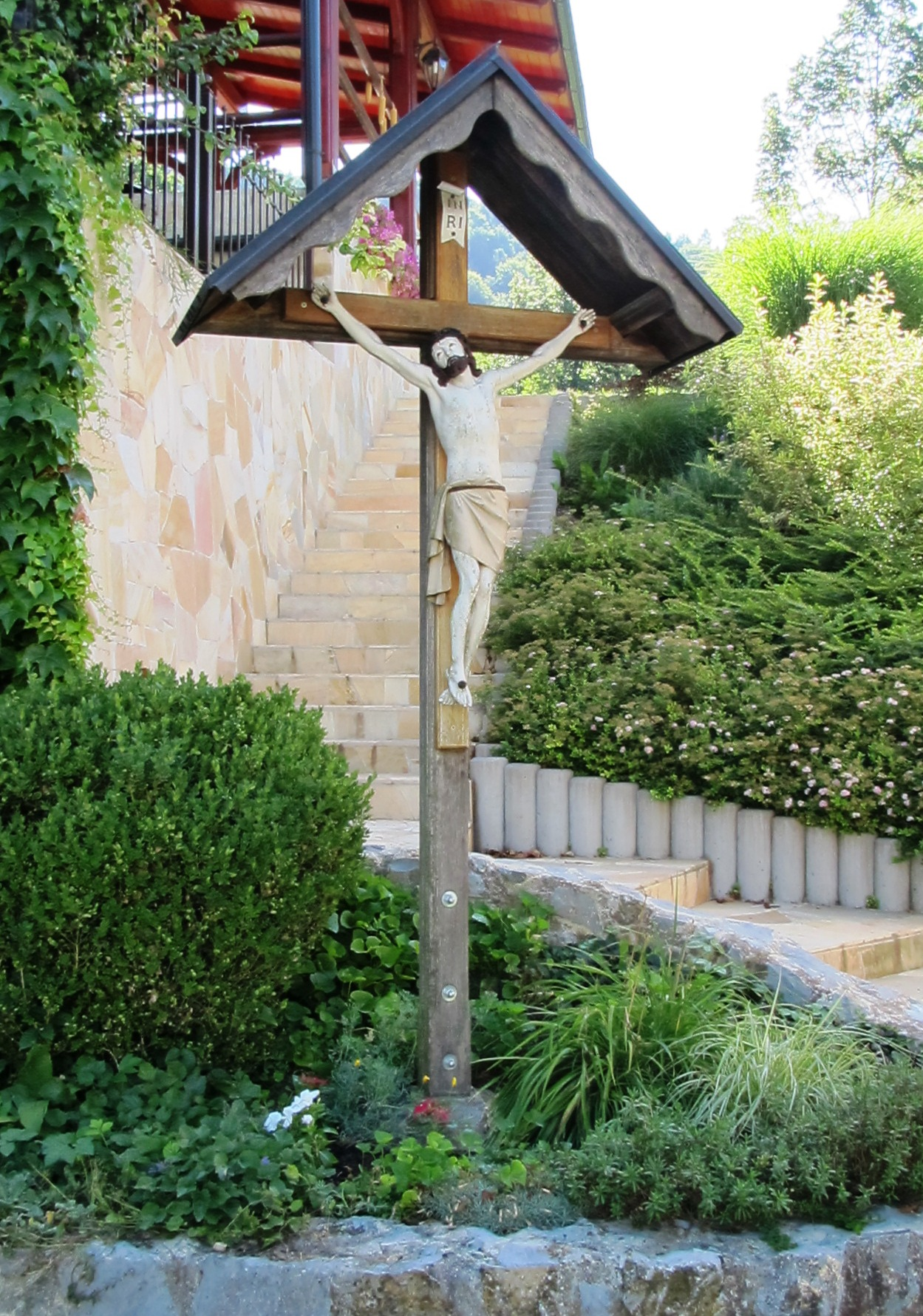
Roadside crucifix in Pristava pri Polhovem Gradcu
