= Smolnik, Dobrova–Polhov Gradec =

Dispersed settlement in Upper Carniola, Slovenia

Smolnik
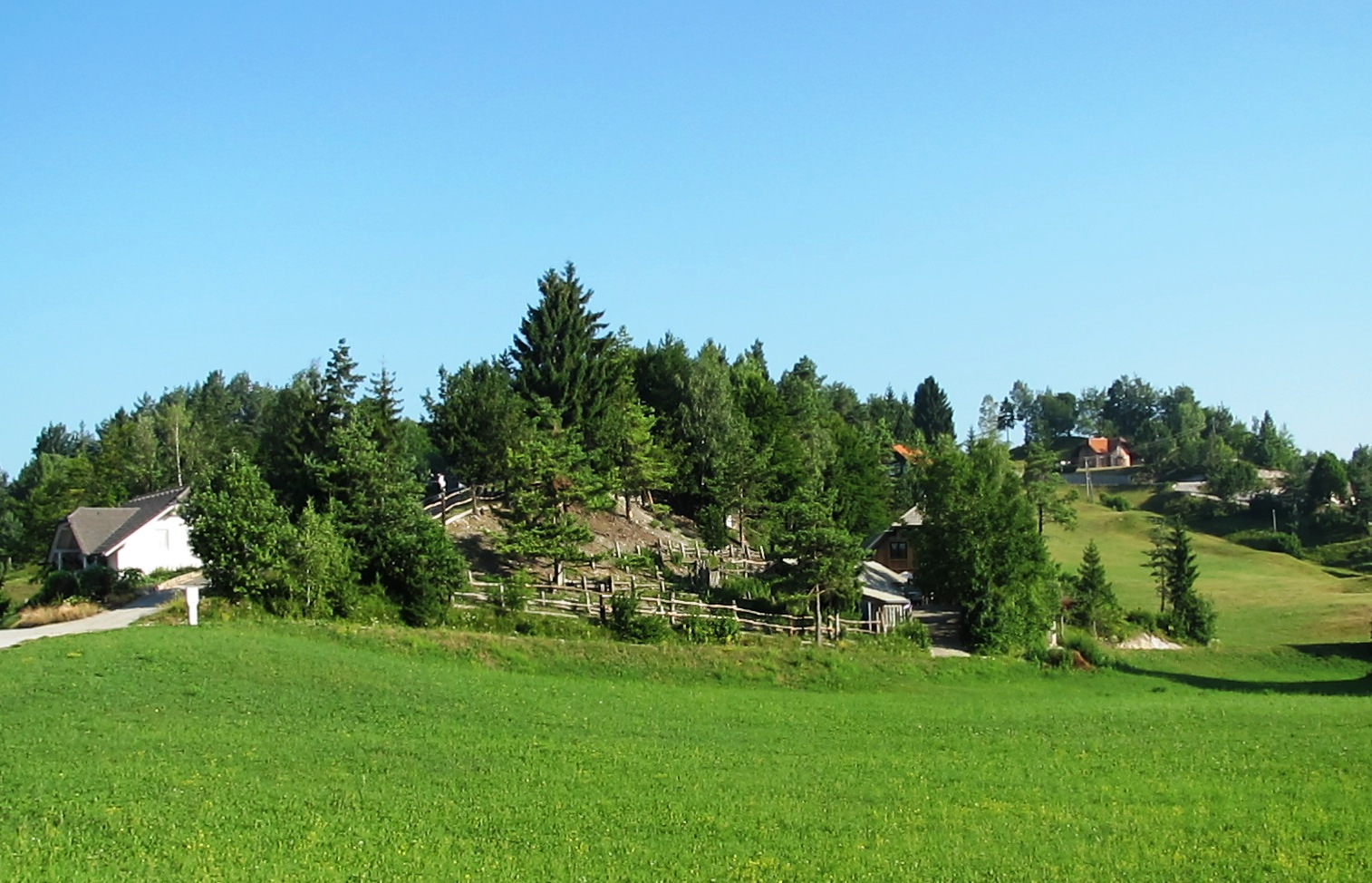

- Location in Slovenia
- Coordinates: 46°4′47.73″N 14°17′8.33″E
- Country: Slovenia
- Traditional region: Upper Carniola
- Statistical region: Central Slovenia
- Municipality: Dobrova–Polhov Gradec

Area
  - Total: 3.62 km^{2} (1.40 sq mi)
- Elevation: 784.8 m (2,575 ft)

Population (2020)
  - Total: 160
  - Density: 44/km^{2} (110/sq mi)

Smolnik (pronounced [ˈsmoːlnik] or [ˈsmoːu̯nik]) is a dispersed settlement in the hills northwest of Polhov Gradec in the Municipality of Dobrova–Polhov Gradec in the Upper Carniola region of Slovenia.

== Name ==
Smolnik was first mentioned in written records in 1498 as Smollnick, Smulnick, and Smolnick. The name is derived from the Slovene word smola 'resin' and refers to a place where resin was gathered.
