= Dvor pri Polhovem Gradcu =

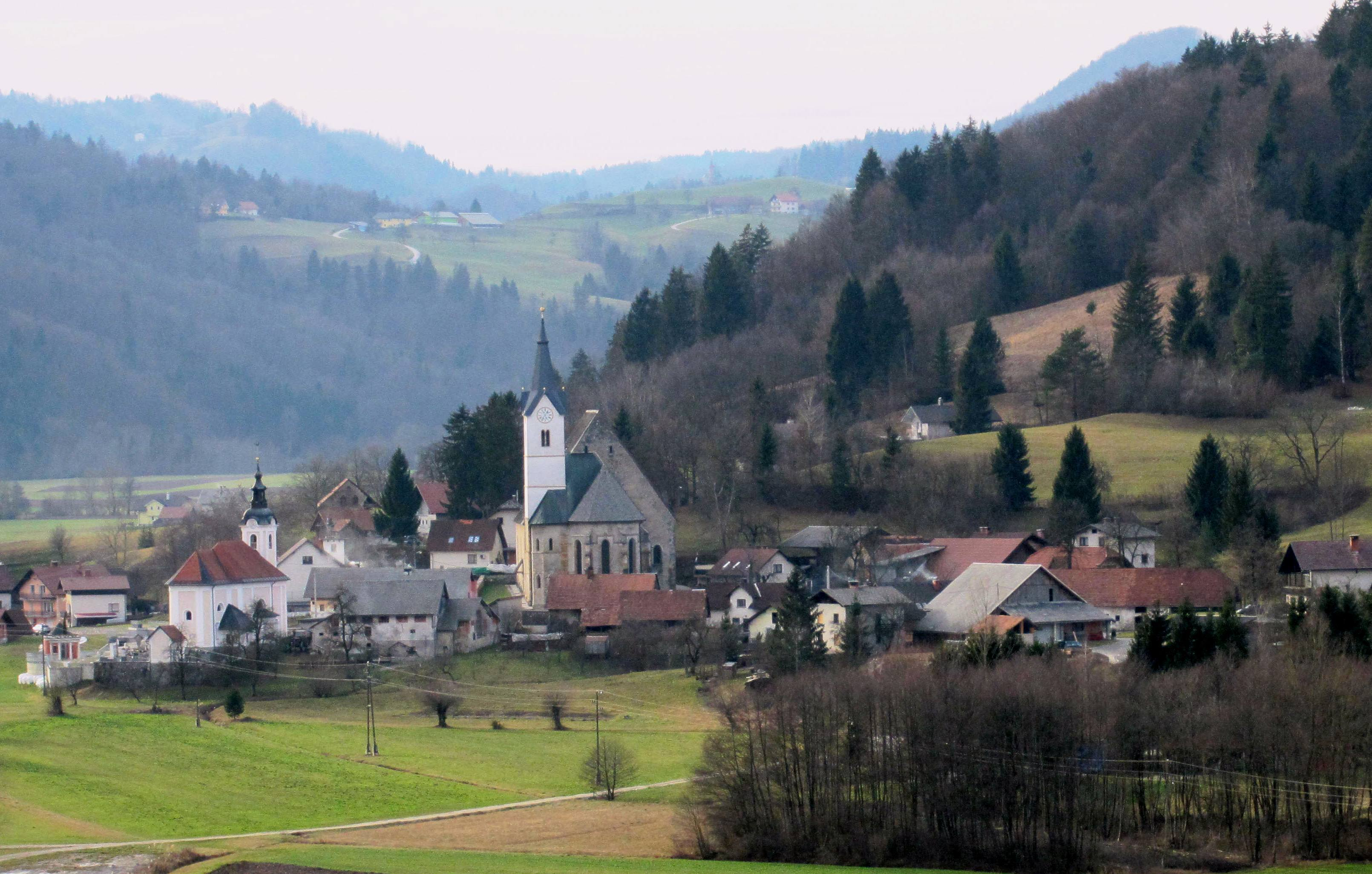

- Location in Slovenia
- Coordinates: 46°3′53.32″N 14°20′45.47″E
- Country: Slovenia
- Traditional region: Upper Carniola
- Statistical region: Central Slovenia
- Municipality: Dobrova–Polhov Gradec

Area
  - Total: 1.08 km^{2} (0.42 sq mi)
- Elevation: 350.2 m (1,149 ft)

Population (2020)
  - Total: 156
  - Density: 144/km^{2} (374/sq mi)

Dvor pri Polhovem Gradcu (pronounced [ˈdʋɔɾ pɾi ˈpou̯ːxoʋɛm ˈɡɾaːtsu]) is a village east of Polhov Gradec in the Municipality of Dobrova–Polhov Gradec in the Upper Carniola region of Slovenia.

== Name ==
In the past Dvor was known as Duor in German. The name of the settlement was changed from Dvor to Dvor pri Polhovem Gradcu in 1955. The name Dvor pri Polhovem Gradcu literally means 'manor near Polhov Gradec.' Dvor is a relatively common toponym in Slovenia and, in addition to 'manor', may also refer to a farm with outbuildings, an estate, a (fenced-in) courtyard, or a barnyard, as well as a medieval agricultural estate comprising up to 40 farms. See Baumgarten Manor below.

== Religious heritage ==
There are two churches in the settlement. The first stands east of the road in the southern part of the settlement. It is dedicated to Saint Nicholas and was first mentioned in documents dating to 1526. It was remodeled in the Baroque style in 1773, perhaps by Lovrenc Prager (ca. 1720–1791). It has an octagonal nave with two side chapels. The main altar dates to 1802. The church has cultural heritage status.

The second church stands in the middle of Dvor pri Polhovem Gradcu. It is a late Gothic structure dedicated to Saint Peter and was built in 1525, probably on the site of an earlier church. It has a carved door casing and a late Gothic wooden ceiling with Renaissance elements. Its main altar dates to 1739 and one of the side altars with the date 1627, dedicated to Saint Valentine, would be the oldest surviving example of a gilded wooden altar in Slovenia if it had not been so excessively restored at various points. The church has cultural heritage status. The church was built from the ruins of Baumgarten Manor after it was destroyed in the earthquake of 1511 and it is also referred to as the "imperial church" (cesarska cerkev) or "count's church" (grofova cerkev).

A chapel-shrine dedicated to the Virgin Mary stands in the center of the settlement, next to the Saint Peter's Church. It has no doors; there is a statue of Mary in the niche, and it bears the year 1897. The shrine has cultural heritage status.

There is a wayside shrine in the extreme northeast part of the settlement, on the east side of the road at the crossroads to Belica and Babna Gora. It is a wooden crucifix with the year 1904 carved into its stone base. The shrine has cultural heritage status.

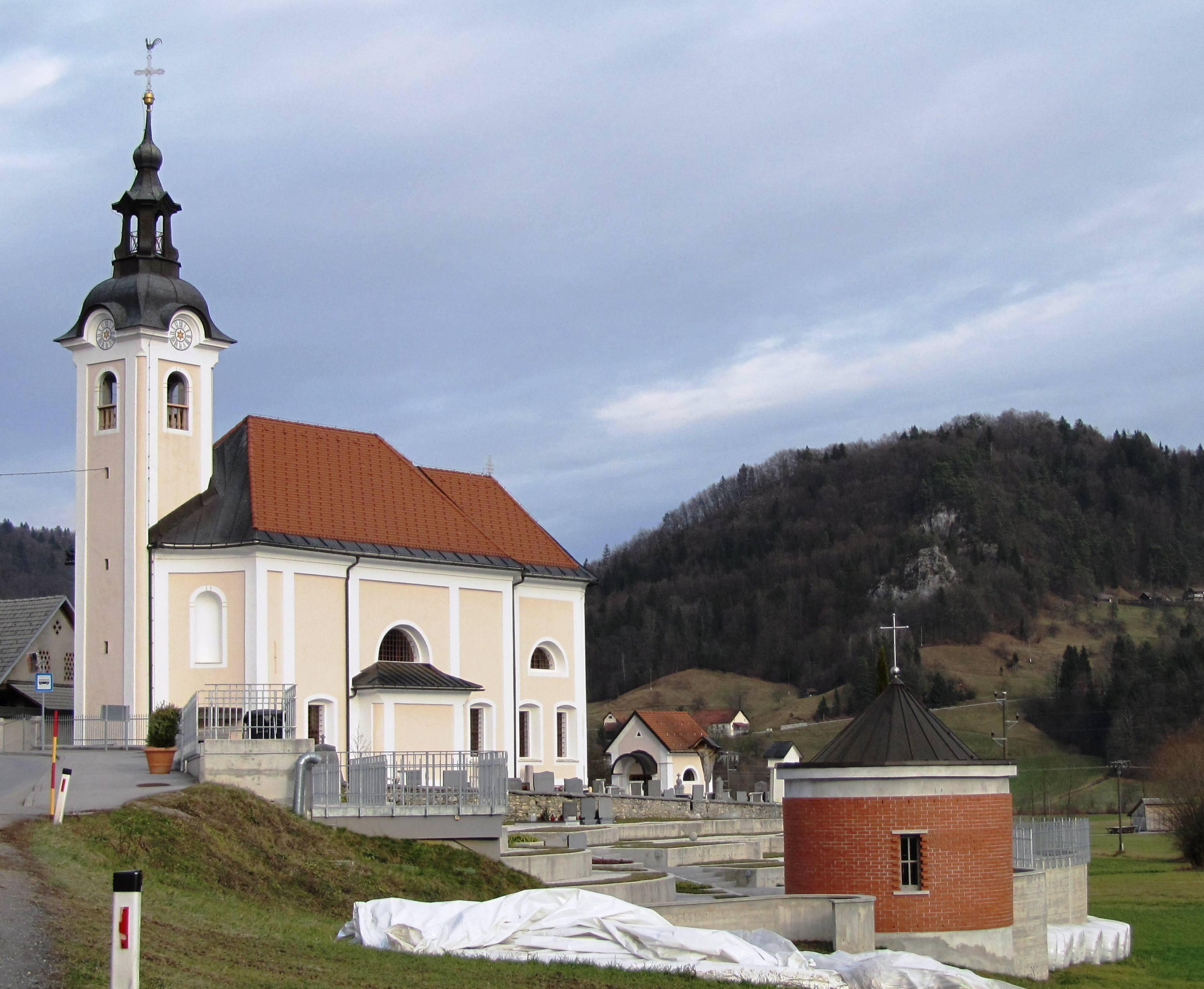
St. Nicholas' Church

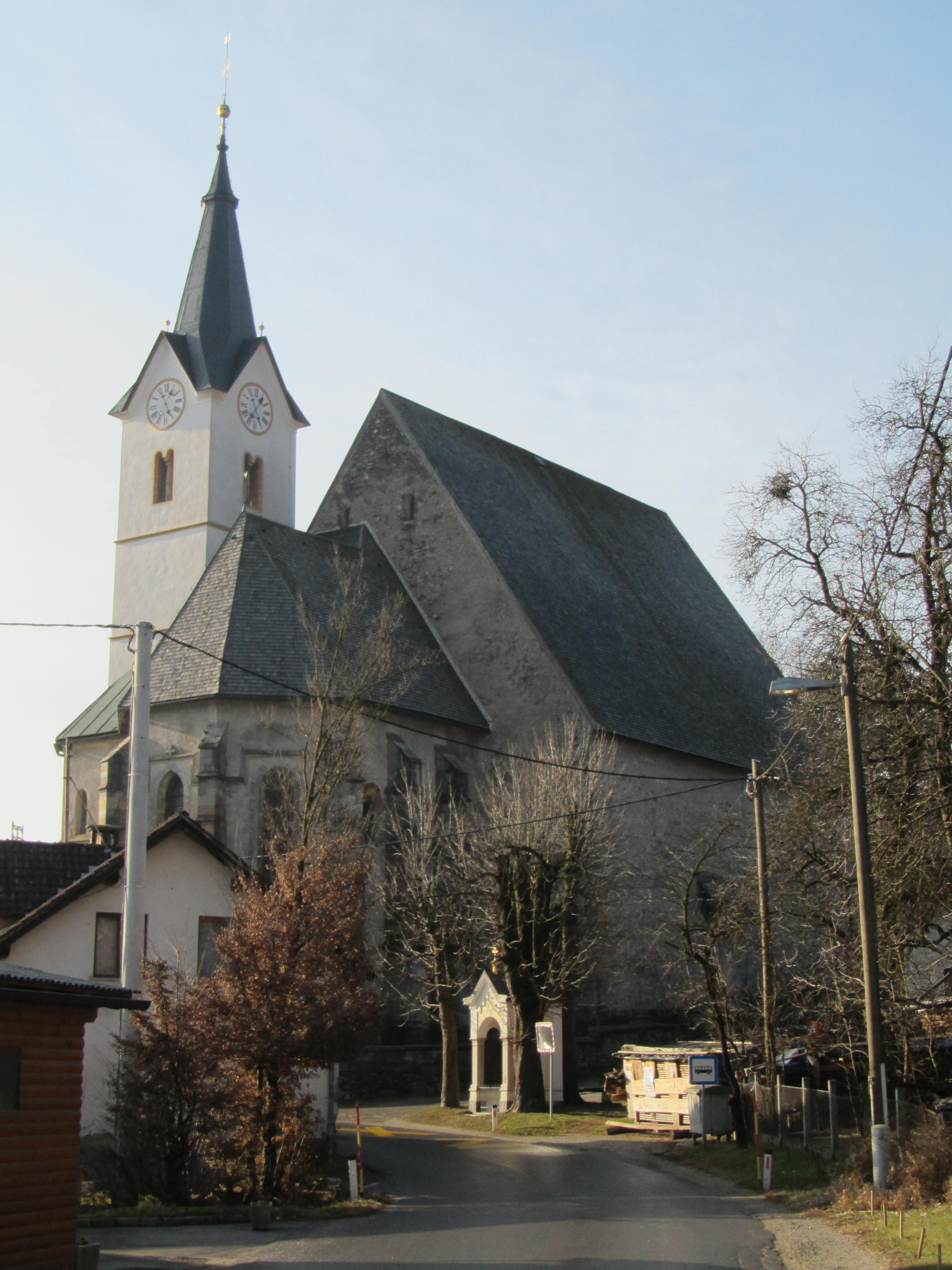
St. Peter's Church

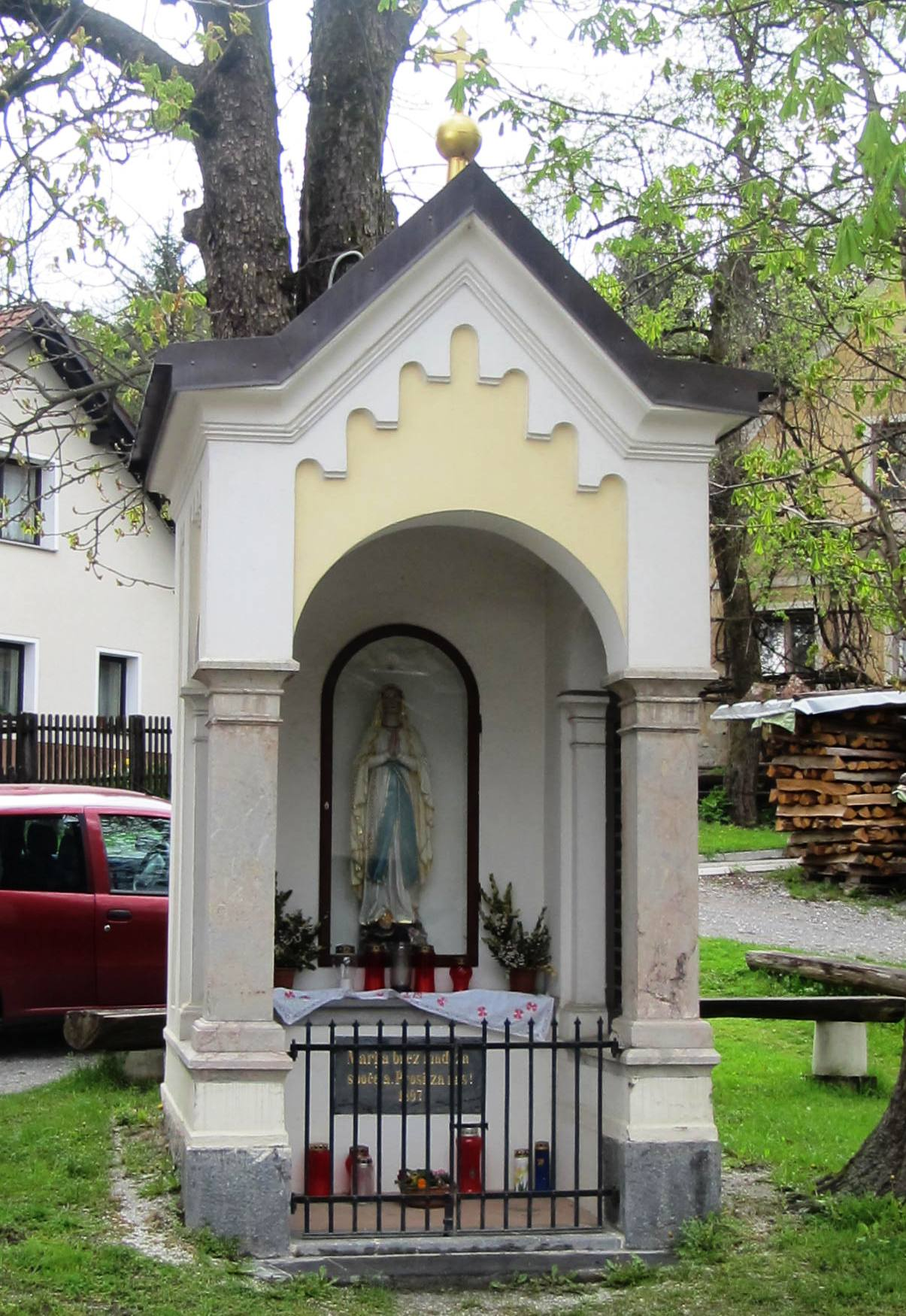
Chapel-shrine in Dvor pri Polhovem Gradcu

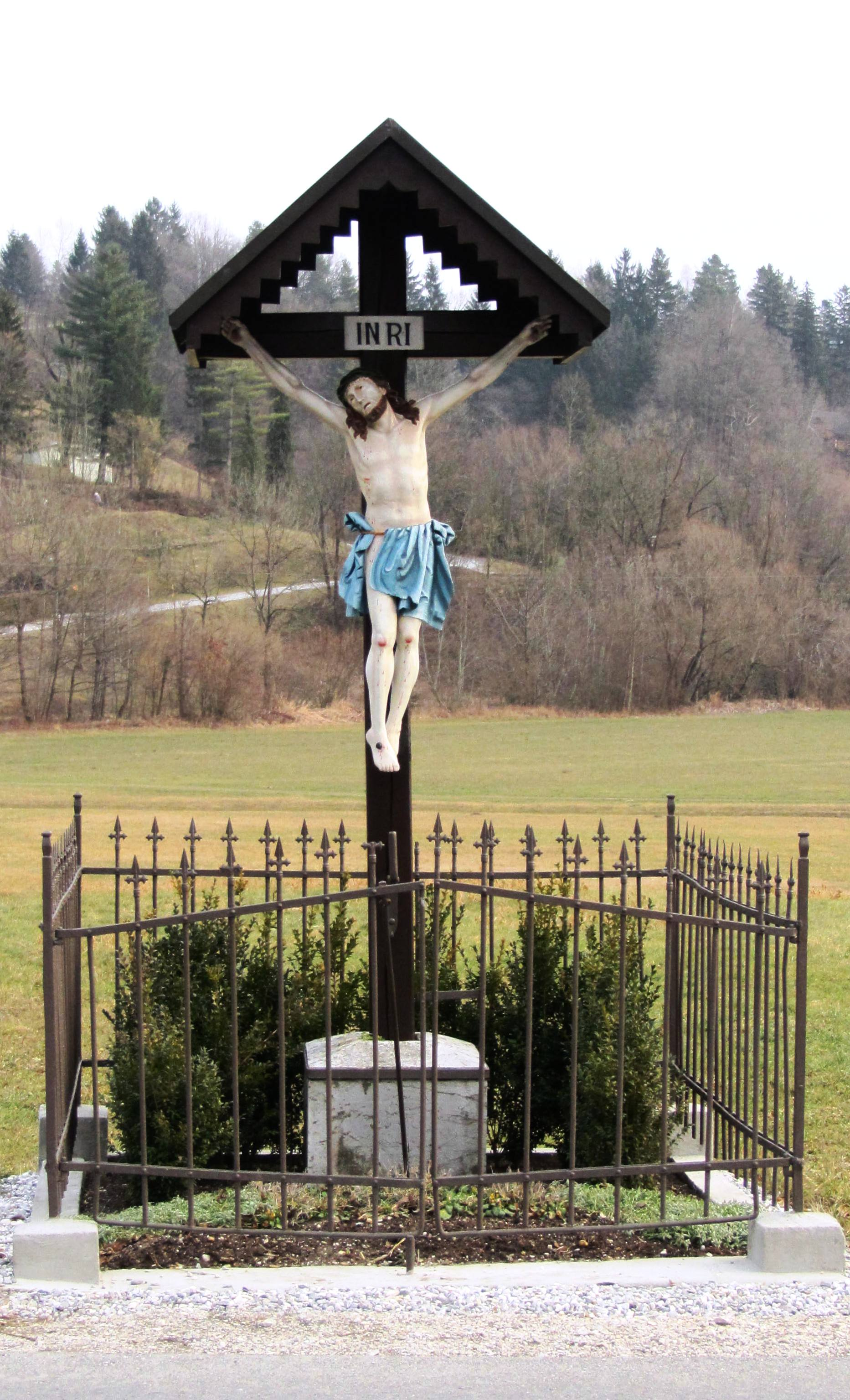
Wayside shrine at the crossroads to Belica and Babna Gora

== Other cultural heritage ==
In addition to churches and shrines, other structures registered as cultural heritage in Dvor pri Polhovem Gradcu include the following:

- The Baumgarten Manor (Baumgartenhof) archaeological site is named after the 15th-century Baumgarten Manor, which was destroyed in the earthquake of 1511. The site includes a flat burial site near Saint Nicholas' Church, where human bones have been discovered. The manor was first mentioned in written sources as Pawngarten in 1469 (and Paumgartten in 1498). It was owned by Konrad Hass at the end of the 15th century.
- The village core of Dvor pri Polhovem Gradcu stands on a terrace above the Gradaščica Valley. Together with its two churches, small square, and linden tree, this preserved clustered village core contains houses from the second half of the 19th century.

== Notable people ==
Notable people that were born or lived in Dvor pri Polhovem Gradcu include:

- Josip Kožuh (1854–1948), geographer and cartographer
