= Srednja Vas pri Polhovem Gradcu =

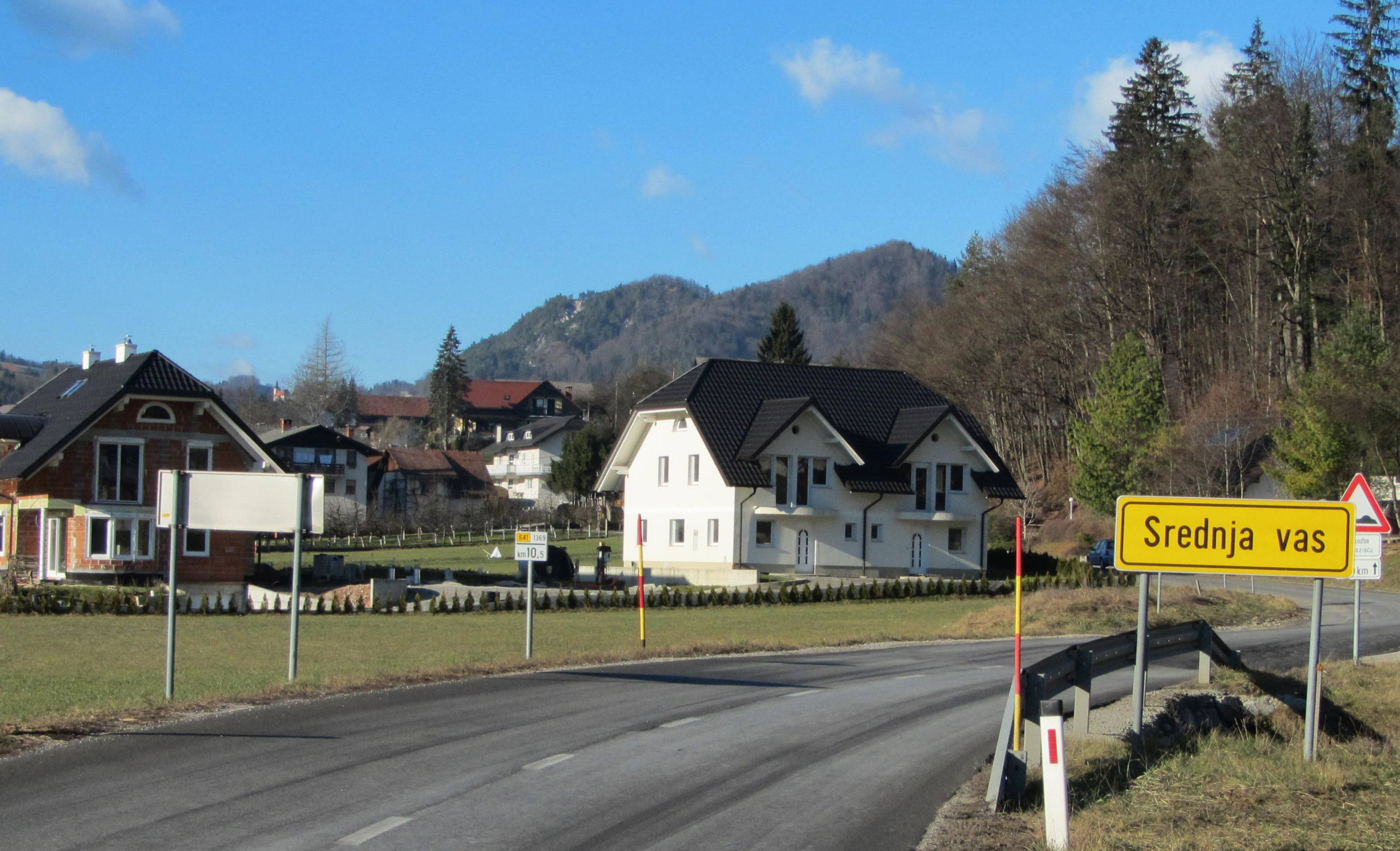

- Location in Slovenia
- Coordinates: 46°3′36.77″N 14°19′45.58″E
- Country: Slovenia
- Traditional region: Upper Carniola
- Statistical region: Central Slovenia
- Municipality: Dobrova–Polhov Gradec

Area
  - Total: 2.22 km^{2} (0.86 sq mi)
- Elevation: 354.6 m (1,163 ft)

Population (2020)
  - Total: 207
  - Density: 93.2/km^{2} (241/sq mi)

Srednja Vas pri Polhovem Gradcu (pronounced [ˈsɾeːdnja ˈʋaːs pɾi ˈpou̯ːxoʋɛm ˈɡɾaːtsu]; Slovene: Srednja vas pri Polhovem Gradcu; German: Mitterdorf) is a small settlement just east of Polhov Gradec in the Municipality of Dobrova–Polhov Gradec in the Upper Carniola region of Slovenia.

== Name ==
The name of the settlement was changed from Srednja vas to Srednja vas pri Polhovem Gradcu in 1953. The name Srednja vas pri Polhovem Gradcu literally means 'middle village near Polhov Gradec'. Srednja vas and names like it (e.g., Srednje) indicate that the settlement lay in some sort of central or middle position. The name is unrelated to names derived from sreda 'Wednesday' (e.g., Središče ob Dravi). In the past it was known as Mitterdorf in German.
