= Briše pri Polhovem Gradcu =

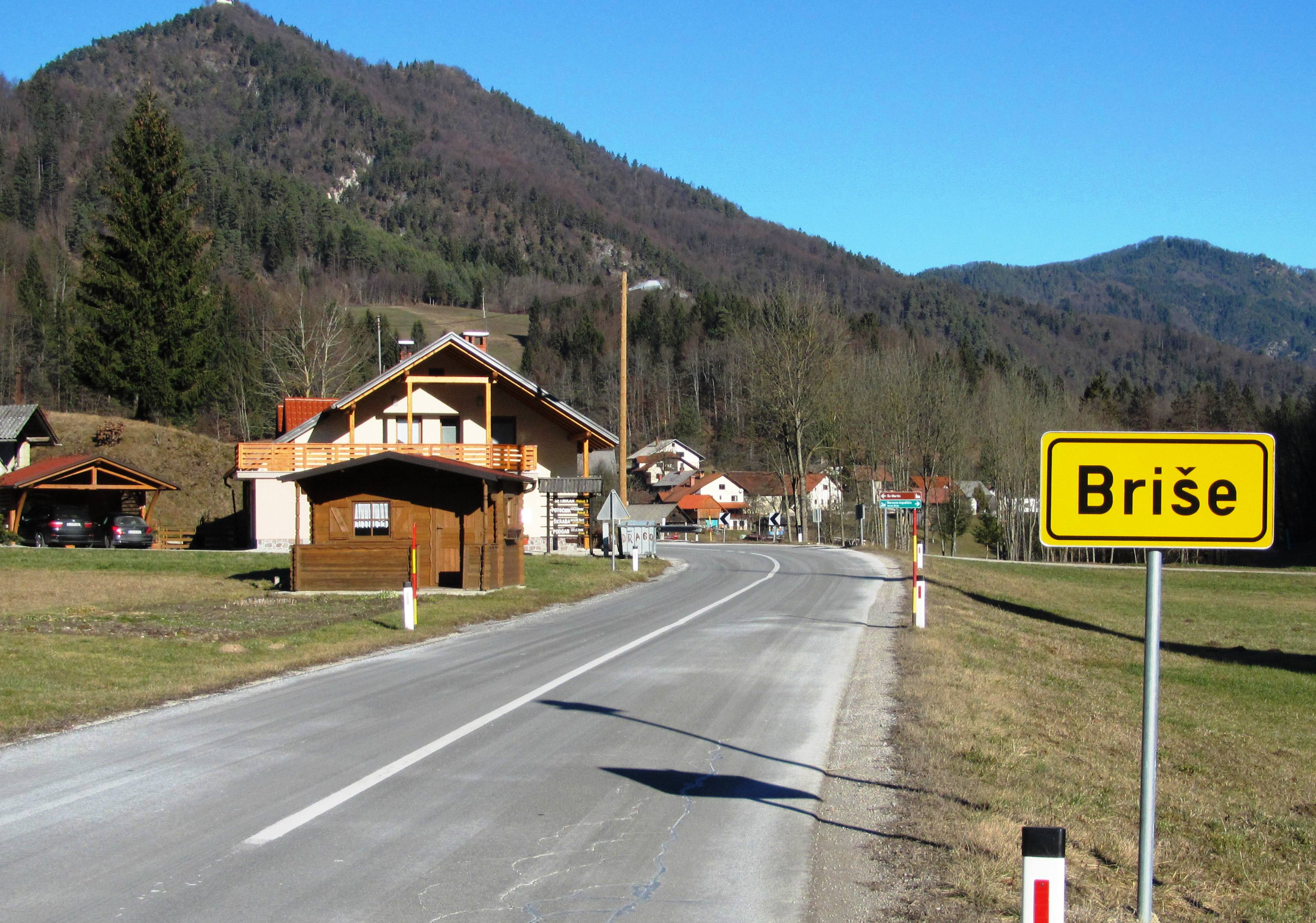

- Location in Slovenia
- Coordinates: 46°3′29.73″N 14°18′11.22″E
- Country: Slovenia
- Traditional region: Upper Carniola
- Statistical region: Central Slovenia
- Municipality: Dobrova–Polhov Gradec

Area
  - Total: 3.98 km^{2} (1.54 sq mi)
- Elevation: 375.4 m (1,232 ft)

Population (2020)
  - Total: 162
  - Density: 40.7/km^{2} (105/sq mi)

Briše pri Polhovem Gradcu (pronounced [ˈbɾiːʃɛ pɾi ˈpoːu̯xɔʋɛm ˈɡɾaːtsu]) is a dispersed settlement just south of Polhov Gradec in the Municipality of Dobrova–Polhov Gradec in the Upper Carniola region of Slovenia. It lies in the valley of Little Creek (Mala Voda) on the road from Polhov Gradec to Lučine and includes the hamlets of Škofijski Hrib (Slovene: Škofijski hrib), Zavrh, and Štebavnik. It is surrounded by Praproče Hill (Praproški grič, 594 m) and Mount Polhov Gradec (Polhograjska gora, 842 m) to the north, Little Peak (Mali vrh, 708 m) to the west, Big Hill (Visoki hrib, 602 m) to the south, Kladnik Hill (588 m) to the southeast, and Zvonščica Hill (530 m) to the east.

== Name ==
The name of the settlement was changed from Briše to Briše pri Polhovem Gradcu in 1953. The name Briše pri Polhovem Gradcu literally means 'Briše near Polhov Gradec'. Briše pri Polhovem Gradcu was first mentioned in written records in 1410 as hof ze Grisch. In the past it was known as Brische in German. The name Briše is shared with a number of other settlements in Slovenia but is of unclear origin, perhaps derived from a personal name.

== Religious heritage ==
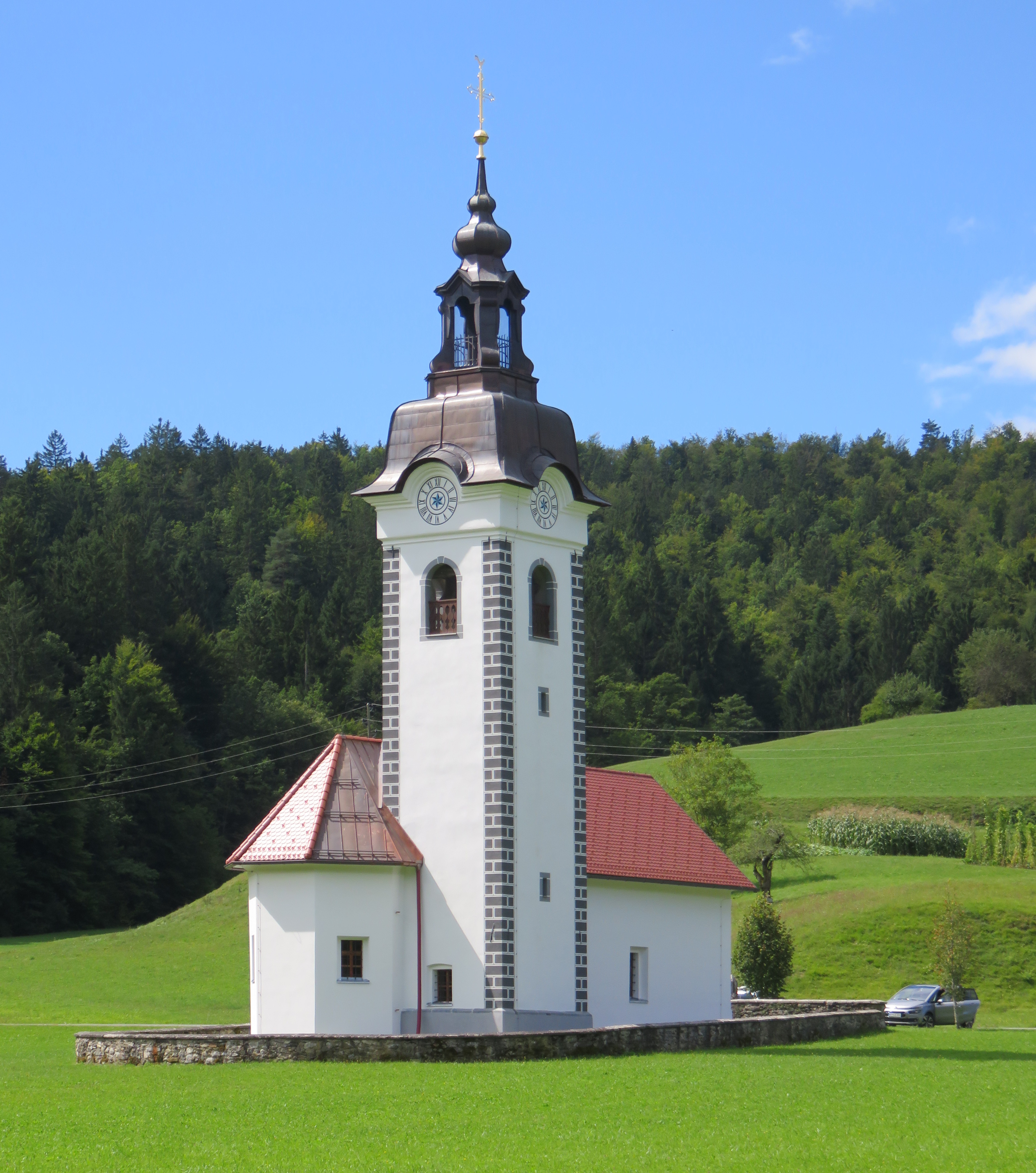
Three Kings Church

The local church stands south of the settlement and is dedicated to the Three Kings. It was first mentioned in documents dating to 1526. It was extended and rebuilt in the 18th century. The main altar dates to 1912. The altar painting of the Three Kings is believed to be a work by Leopold Layer (1752–1828). The church is registered as cultural heritage.

At the northeast end of the village on the road to Polhov Gradec is an open chapel-shrine dedicated to the Three Kings. It was designed by Tomaž Štrukelj, a pupil of Jože Plečnik, and was built in 1939 to replace an older shrine damaged by flooding in 1924 and 1926. It incorporates a copy of a wooden high relief dating from approximately 1650 from the old chapel depicting the Three Kings. The shrine is registered as cultural heritage.

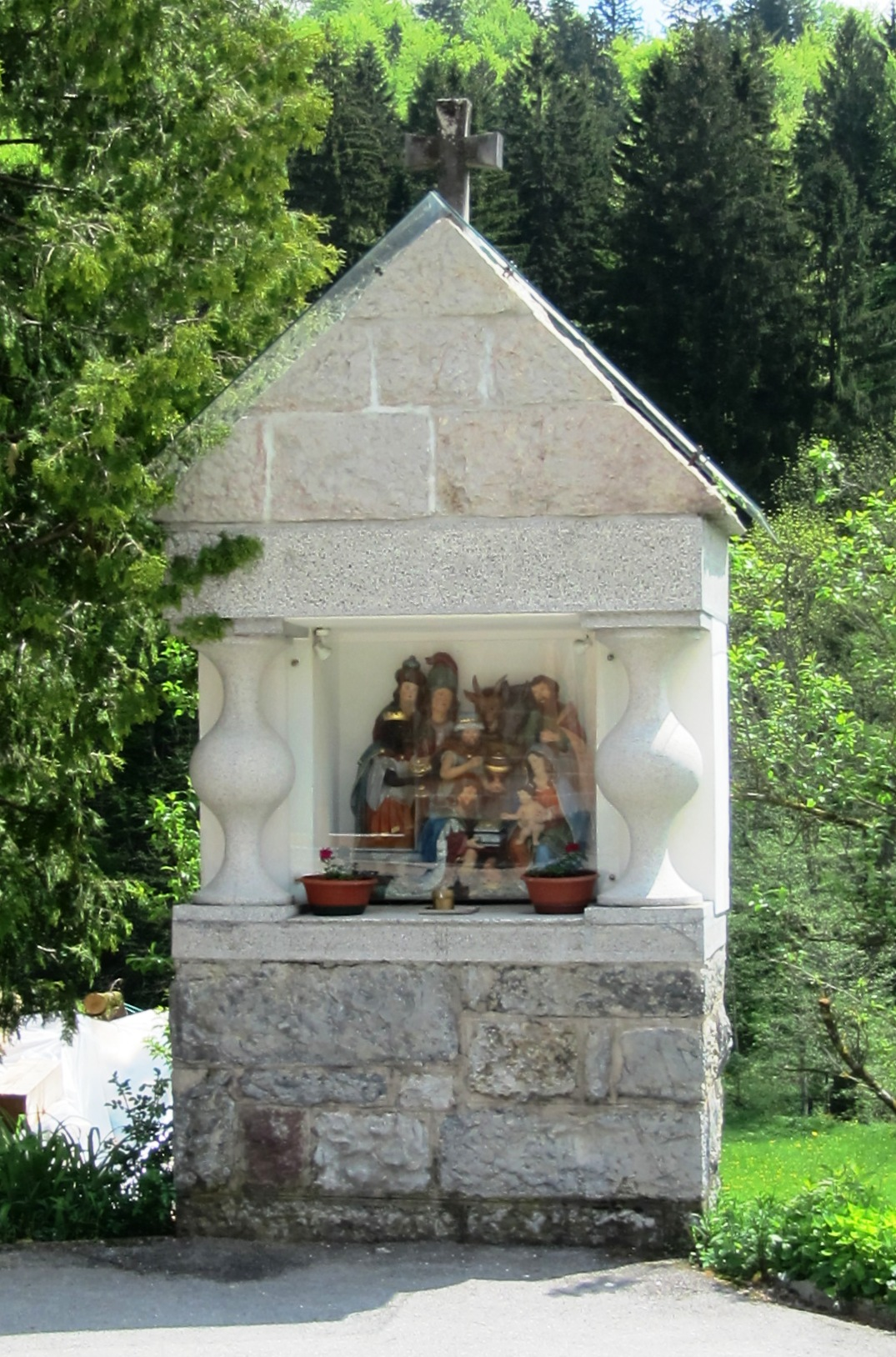
Open chapel-shrine, dedicated to the Three Kings

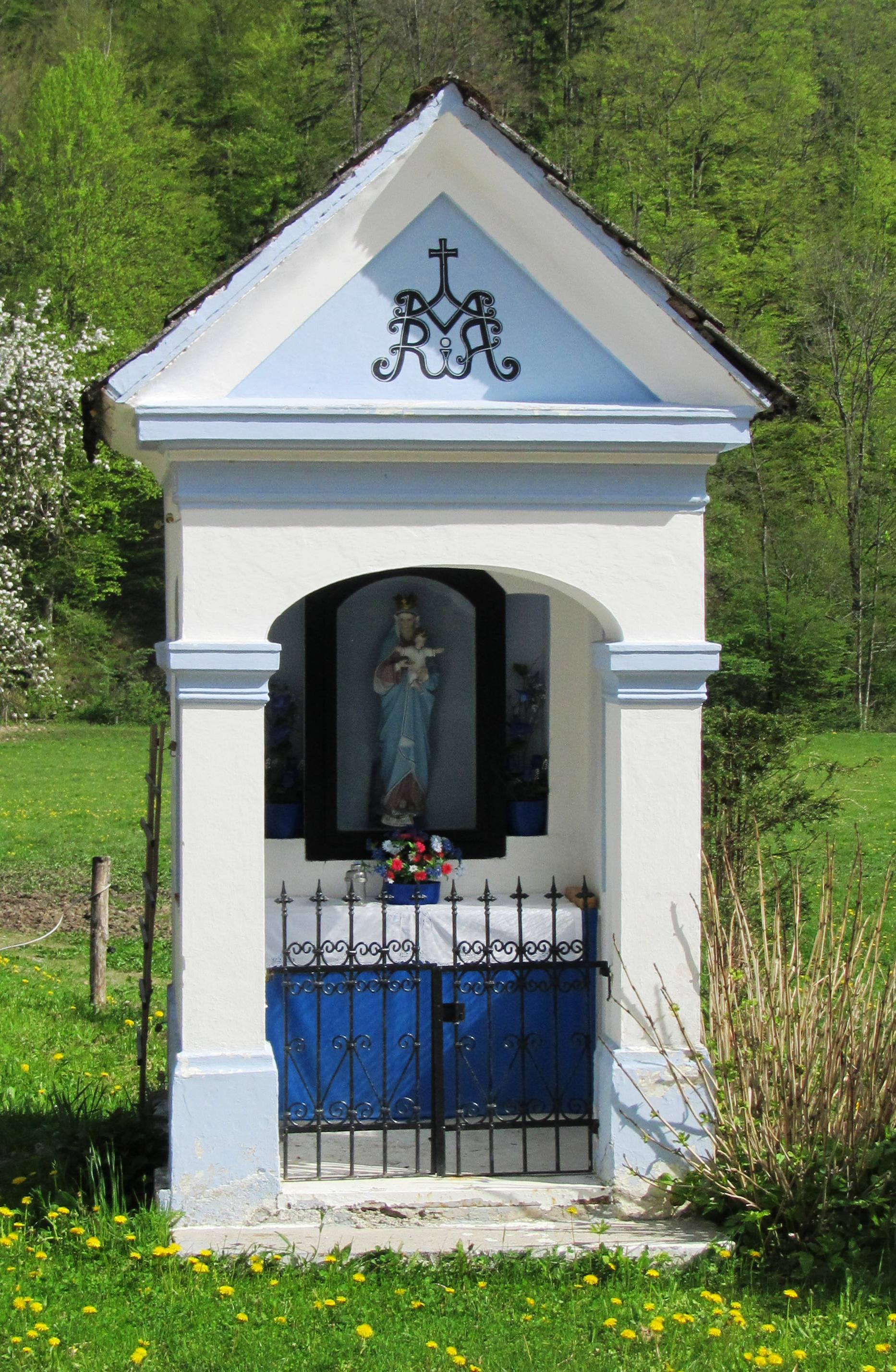
Closed chapel-shrine, dedicated to the Virgin Mary

== Other cultural heritage ==
In addition to its church and shrine, Briše pri Polhovem Gradcu has a number of other registered cultural heritage items:

- The Three Kings archaeological site is still largely unexplored. It lies west of Three Kings' Church. Artificial defensive terraces have been discovered here that would have controlled the route from the narrow valley of Little Creek (Mala voda).
- The farm at Briše pri Polhovem Gradcu no. 13 stands southwest of the village core, at the entry to the valley of Little Creek. The buildings are arranged in a cluster; the two-story house has been restored and the year 1860 is carved into the semicircular door casing. There are also a two-story barn and a chapel-shrine with doors, as well as a double hayrack across the road.
- The farm at Briše pri Polhovem Gradcu no. 3 stands in the village center and dates from the 19th century. It consists of a two-story house that combines a living area and area for animals under a single symmetrical gabled roof. The facade facing the road has been reworked; its upper level with small windows and a traditional wooden balcony has been preserved, as has the barn section of the structure.

== Notable people ==
Notable people that were born or lived in Briše pri Polhovem Gradcu include:

- Anton Koritnik (1875–1951), philologist, priest, teacher, and principal of the St. Stanislaus Institute in Šentvid
- Gregor "Griša" Koritnik (1886–1967), poet and translator
