= Rovt, Dobrova–Polhov Gradec =

Rovt
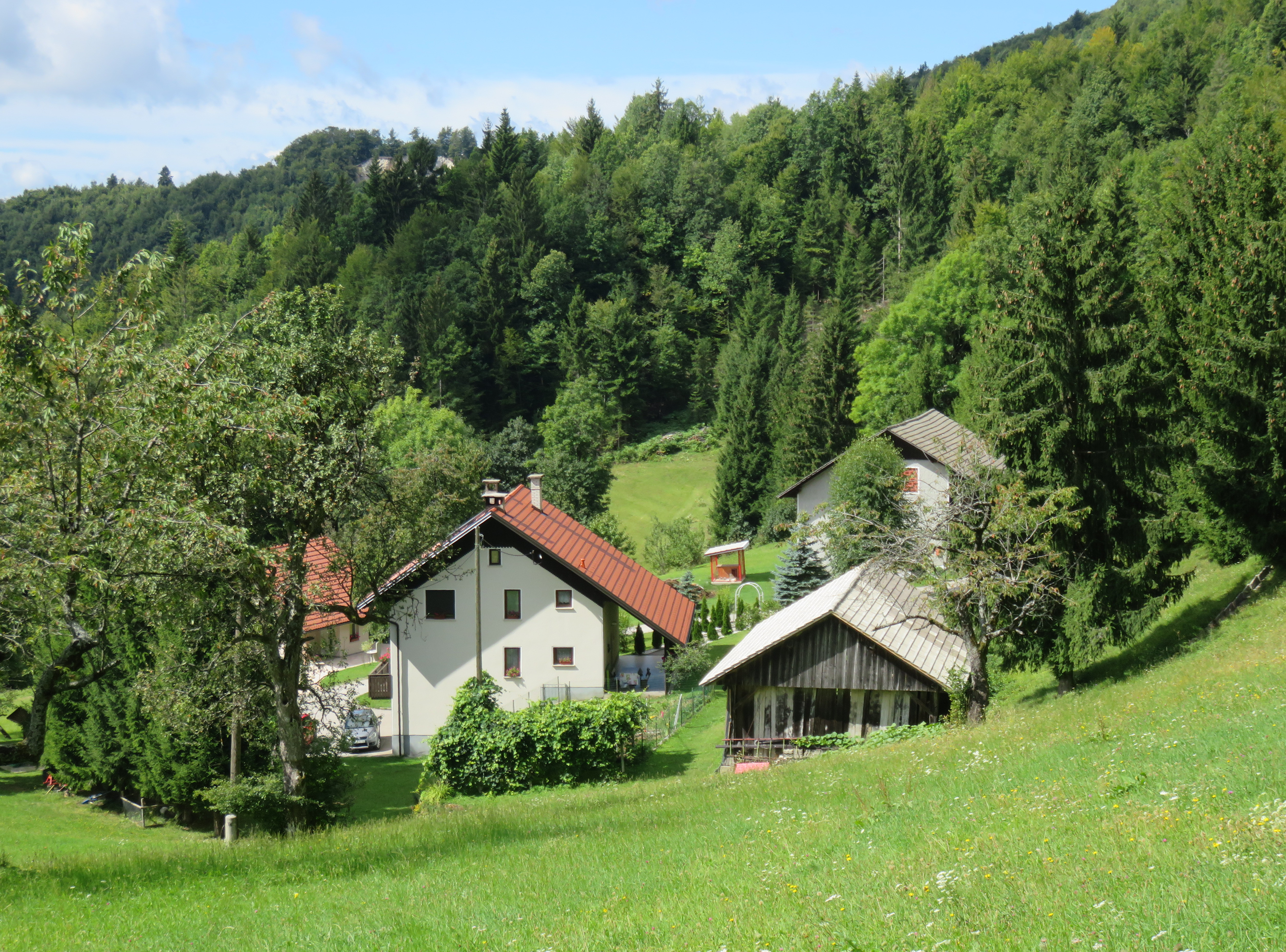

- Location in Slovenia
- Coordinates: 46°4′49.35″N 14°13′0.68″E
- Country: Slovenia
- Traditional region: Upper Carniola
- Statistical region: Central Slovenia
- Municipality: Dobrova–Polhov Gradec

Area
  - Total: 2.13 km^{2} (0.82 sq mi)
- Elevation: 668.5 m (2,193 ft)

Population (2020)
  - Total: 60
  - Density: 28/km^{2} (73/sq mi)

Rovt (pronounced [ˈɾoːu̯t]) is a dispersed settlement in the hills west of Polhov Gradec in the Municipality of Dobrova–Polhov Gradec in the Upper Carniola region of Slovenia.

== Name ==
The name Rovt is derived from the common noun rovt 'glade, clearing', referring to a meadow on cleared land in a hilly area. The Slovene word rovt is derived from Old High German rût 'clearing'. Like other places with similar names (e.g., Rovte, Rut), this name refers to a local geographical feature.
