= Brezje pri Dobrovi =

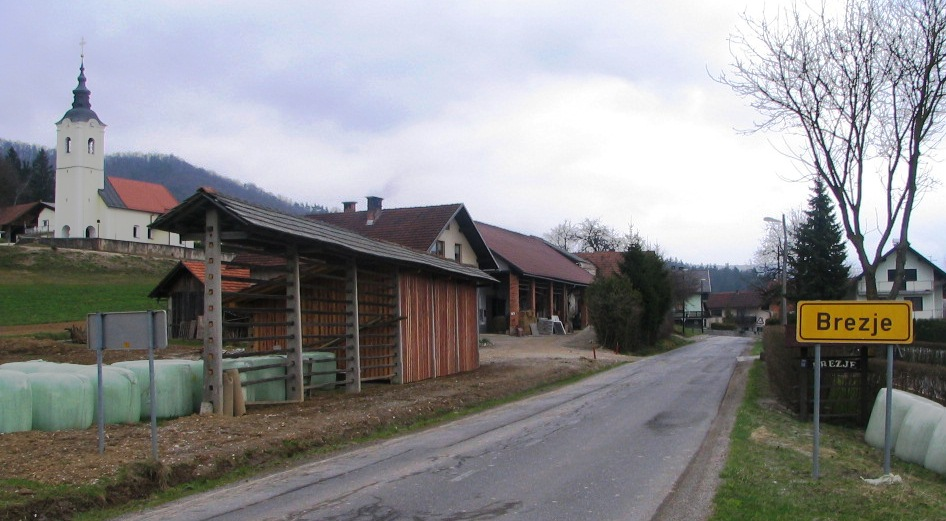

- Location in Slovenia
- Coordinates: 46°1′43.47″N 14°20′54.38″E
- Country: Slovenia
- Traditional region: Upper Carniola
- Statistical region: Central Slovenia
- Municipality: Dobrova–Polhov Gradec

Government

Area
  - Total: 6.82 km^{2} (2.63 sq mi)
- Elevation: 339 m (1,112 ft)

Population (2020)
  - Total: 459
  - Density: 67.3/km^{2} (174/sq mi)

Brezje pri Dobrovi (pronounced [ˈbɾeːzjɛ pɾi ˈdoːbɾɔʋi]) is an elongated village in the Municipality of Dobrova–Polhov Gradec in the Upper Carniola region of Slovenia on the road from Dobrova to Horjul. It lies on the somewhat elevated north side of the marshy valley of Horjulka Creek and it also includes the hamlet of Poljšno Brdo to the east of the main settlement. Ključ Hill (623 m) rises above the settlement to the north, and Strmca Hill (472 m) to the south.

== Name ==
Brezje pri Dobrovi was attested in written sources as Bresa in 1453, Bresye in 1490, Brassa in 1494, and Bresyach in 1496, among other spellings. The name of the settlement was changed from Brezje to Brezje pri Dobrovi in 1953. Brezje pri Dobrovi literally means 'Brezje near Dobrova'. The name Brezje is shared with several other places in Slovenia and is derived from the word brezje 'birch grove'. In the past it was known as Bresie in German.

== History ==
A school was established in the village in 1911 in a private home, and a schoolhouse was built in 1928.

On 12 May 1942 there was a pitched battle at nearby Ključ Hill between the Partisans and the Italians, during which the village came under fire, and was then burned on 13 May.

=== Mass grave ===
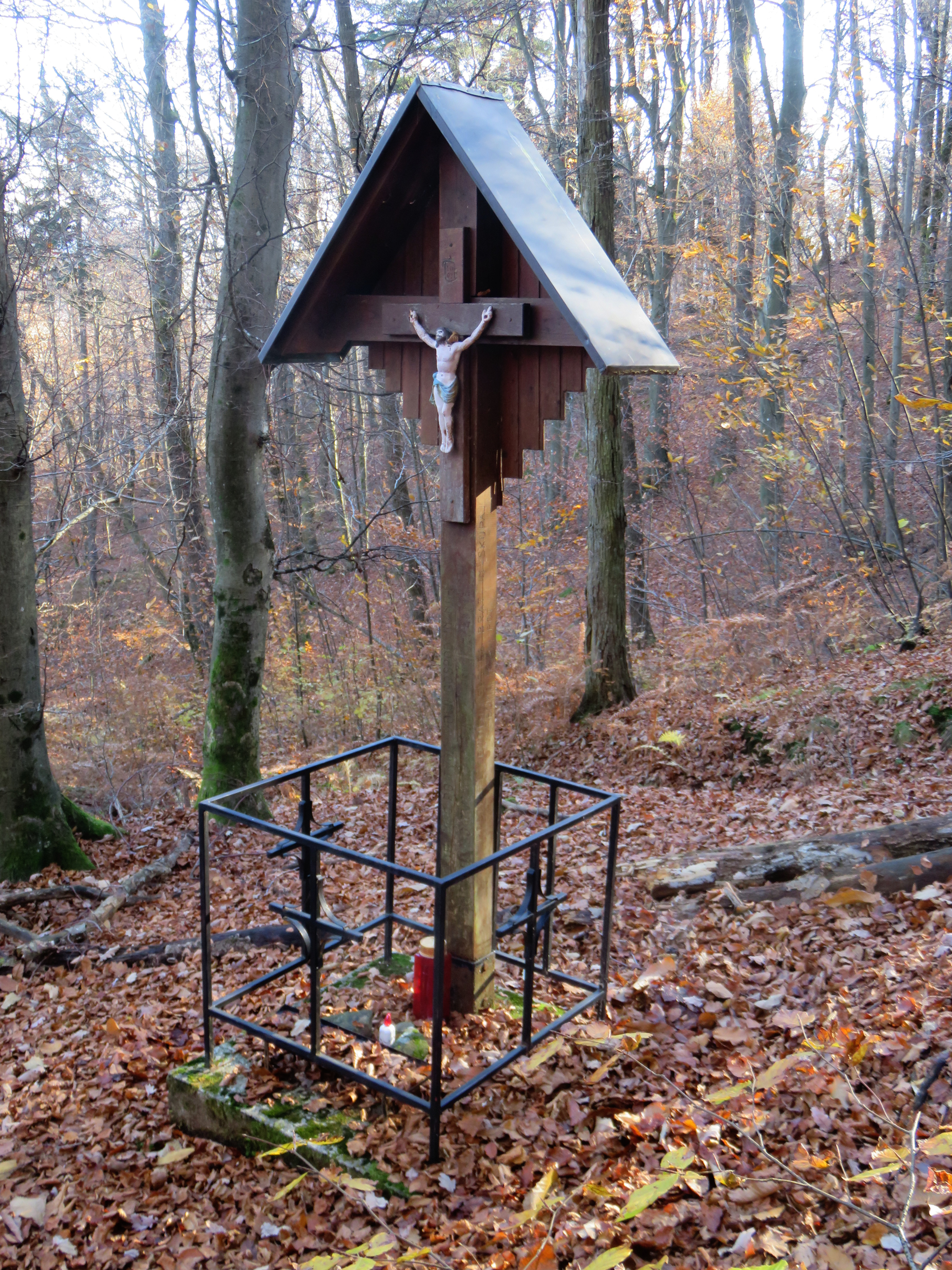
Marker at the Ključ 1 and 2 Mass Graves

Brezje pri Dobrovi is the site of two civilian mass graves from the Second World War. The Ključ 1 Mass Grave (Slovene: Grobišče na Ključu 1) and Ključ 2 Mass Grave (Grobišče na Ključu 2) are pits on the southern slope of Ključ Hill. Three sisters from the Skopec family of Stranska Vas, from the Glinar farm, were murdered and buried here by the Partisans on 28 April 1942 after the leadership of the Dolomite Detachment accused them of betrayal.

== Church ==
The church in Brezje pri Dobrovi was originally subordinate to the proto-parish of Šentvid nad Ljubljano. The church was assigned to Dobrova when it became a vicariate in 1723, and when Dobrova was elevated to a parish in 1784 it became part of that parish.

The local church is dedicated to Saint Agnes. The church was first mentioned in 1526. It was originally built in Gothic style, but was remodeled in Baroque style in 1729 and 1758. The church is registered as a cultural monument.

== Cultural heritage ==
In addition to Saint Agnes' Church, Brezje pri Dobrovi has several structures registered as cultural heritage:

- The Polšno Brdo archaeological site is still largely unexplored. Roman-era pottery and construction material has been found here and an extensive field survey of the area was carried out in 2011.
- The farm at Brezje pri Dobrovi no. 44 stands above the road into the settlement below the edge of the woods. It is an elongated single-story structure with a central entrance and a symmetrical gabled roof covered with concrete tiles. Alongside the gabled facade there is an outbuilding.
- The house at Brezje pri Dobrovi no. 16 stands in the center of the village. This is a single-story rectangular structure, partially cellared, with a symmetrical gabled roof, incorporating both living quarters and an area for livestock. There is a central entryway from the courtyard and the year 1862 is carved into the black door casing.
- The house at Brezje pri Dobrovi no. 17 stands in a clustered area of the village. This is a single-story rectangular structure with a part for livestock. The entryway has a semicircular door casing carved from black limestone, and the year 1886 is carved into the door casing of the livestock area.
- An unnumbered house stands on the southwestern edge of the clustered part of the settlement, south of the church. It was numbered Brezje pri Dobrovi no. 1 in older documentation. This is a single-story rectangular structure with a central entrance and a large dormer above it. The year 1866 is carved into the richly decorated door casing. The facade is richly segmented with cornices and a soffit.
- The Partisan Lodge on Ključ Hill was built in 1979 to commemorate members of the Dolomite Detachment. It contains a memorial room, and a plaque and dedication are attached to the structure.

== Notable people ==
Notable people that were born or lived in Brezje pri Dobrovi include:

- Janez Gregorin (1911–1942), pen name Igor Zagrenjen, novella writer
