= Podreber, Dobrova–Polhov Gradec =

Podreber
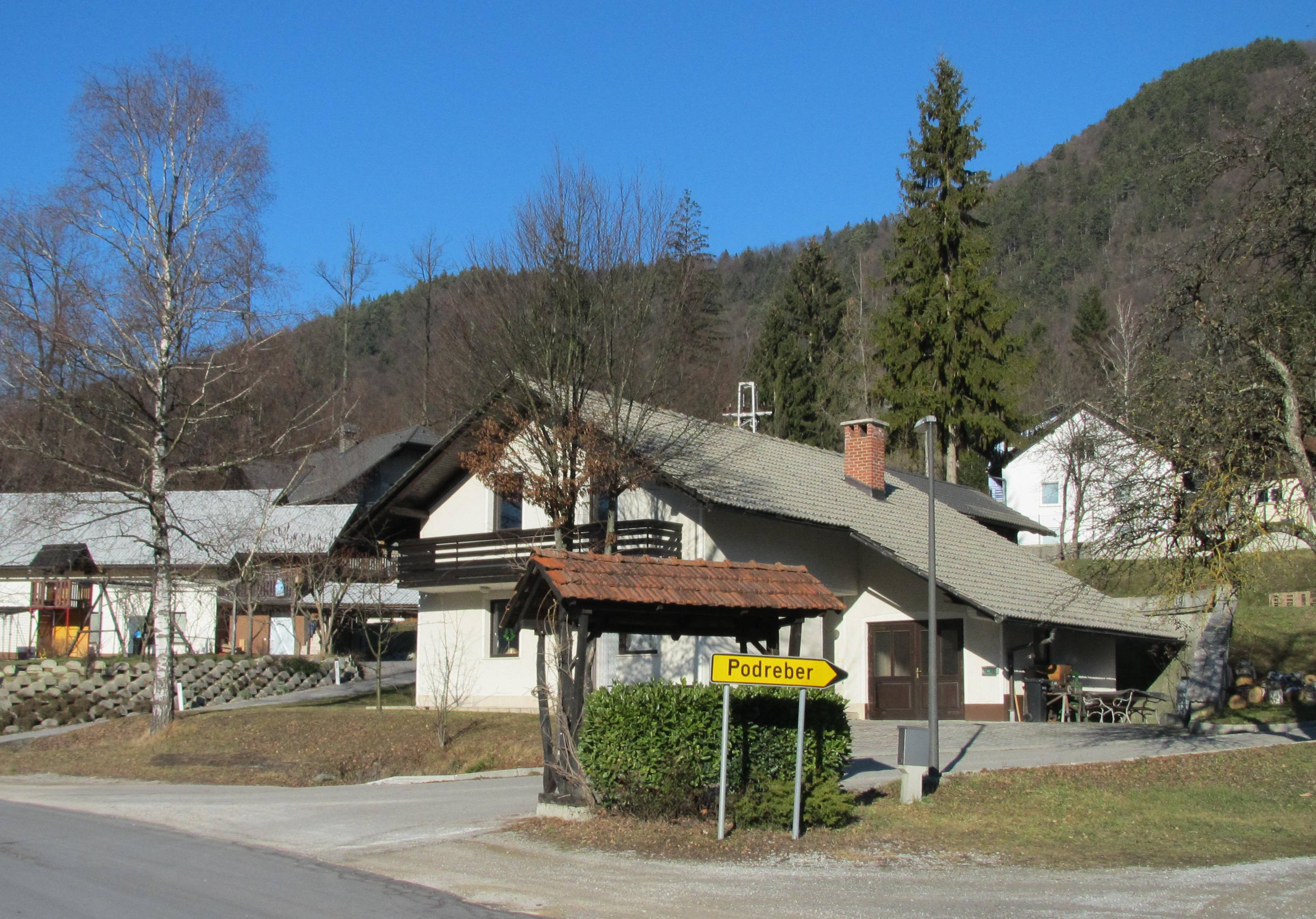
- The village of Podreber with Kucelj Hill rising in the background

- Location in Slovenia
- Coordinates: 46°3′49.55″N 14°19′16.11″E
- Country: Slovenia
- Traditional region: Upper Carniola
- Statistical region: Central Slovenia
- Municipality: Dobrova–Polhov Gradec

Area
  - Total: 1.14 km^{2} (0.44 sq mi)
- Elevation: 400.2 m (1,313 ft)

Population (2020)
  - Total: 187
  - Density: 164/km^{2} (425/sq mi)

Podreber (pronounced [pɔˈdɾeːbəɾ]) is a small settlement east of the town of Polhov Gradec in the Municipality of Dobrova–Polhov Gradec in the Upper Carniola region of Slovenia. It lies on the road from Ljubljana to Polhov Gradec below Kucelj Hill (705 m).

== Name ==
The name Podreber is derived from a prepositional phrase in which the noun has lost its case ending: pod 'below' + reber 'slope'. The name therefore means 'below the slope' and refers to the settlement's position on the south slope of Kucelj Hill.

== Church ==
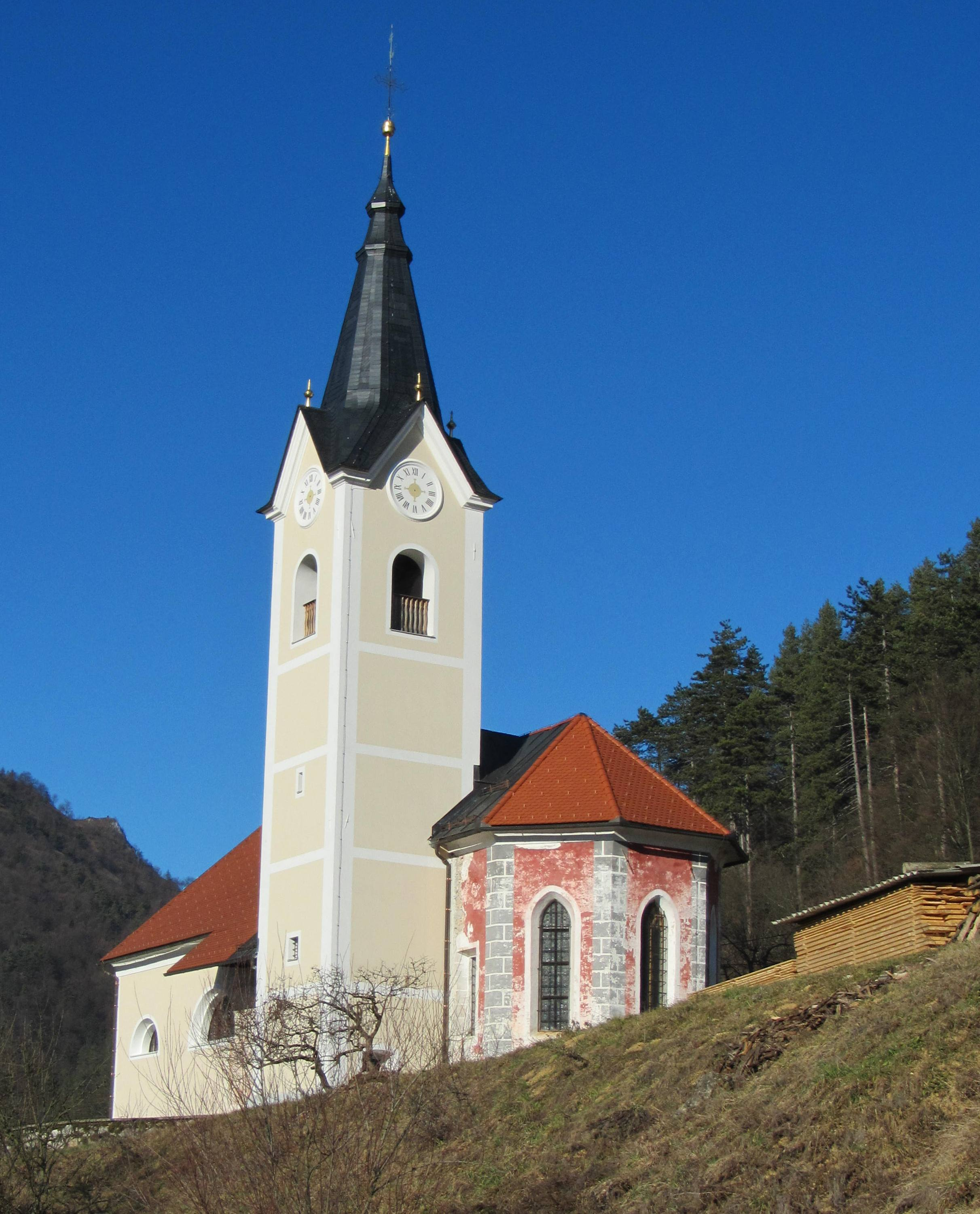
St. Elizabeth's Church

St. Elizabeth's Church in the village was first mentioned in 1526 but is considerably older. The main altar dates from the beginning of the 18th century, and the two side altars are gilded altars dating from 1625.
