= Belica, Dobrova–Polhov Gradec =

Belica
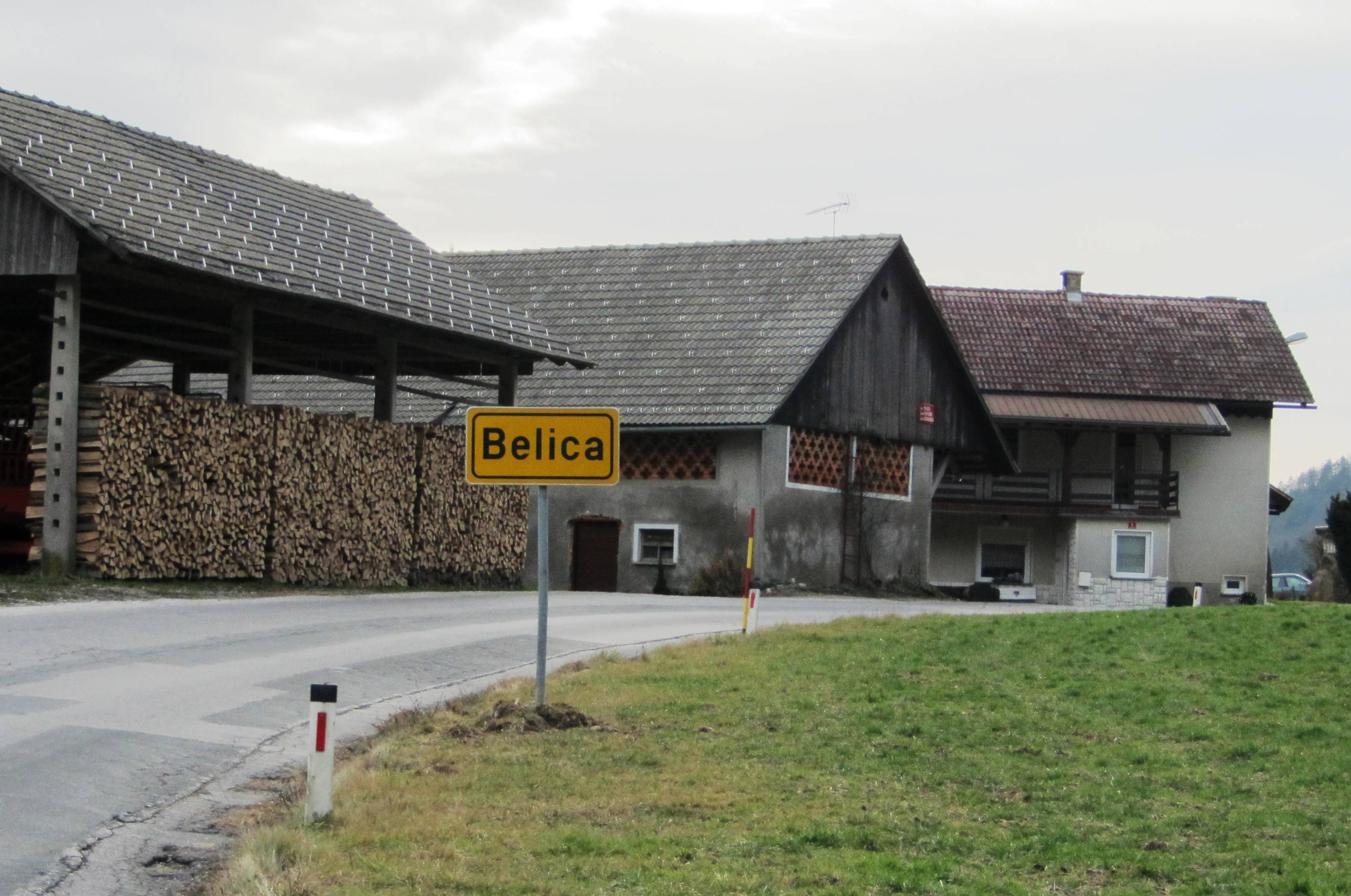

- Location in Slovenia
- Coordinates: 46°4′28.09″N 14°21′7.34″E
- Country: Slovenia
- Traditional region: Upper Carniola
- Statistical region: Central Slovenia
- Municipality: Dobrova–Polhov Gradec

Area
  - Total: 1.73 km^{2} (0.67 sq mi)
- Elevation: 551.1 m (1,808 ft)

Population (2020)
  - Total: 35
  - Density: 20/km^{2} (52/sq mi)

Belica (pronounced [ˈbeːlitsa]) is a small settlement east of the town of Polhov Gradec in the Municipality of Dobrova–Polhov Gradec in the Upper Carniola region of Slovenia. It lies on the left bank of the Gradaščica River on the road from Ljubljana to Polhov Gradec, bounded by Rabidovš Hill (520 m) to the north and Črtež Hill (480 m) to the northwest.

== Name ==
The name Belica literally means 'white (creek)'. Belica was first mentioned in written sources in 1303 under the German name Weissempach (literally, 'white creek'), and in 1436 with the Slovene name represented as Welcz, among other spellings of the name. In the past it was known as Belza in German. Like most Slovene places called Belica, this name is also derived from a hydronym, as reflected in Belca Creek, which flows through the settlement.

== History ==
A bronze plaque in the Belca Gorge (Slovene: Belška grapa) above Belica has cultural heritage status. This memorial commemorates the Second World War Partisan First Battalion of the Dolomite Detachment. The bronze plaque was installed to replace an earlier stone plaque, and it reads: "Passersby, pause. In the Belca Gorge on 19 March 1943, 22 men from the First Battalion of the Dolomite Detachment of the National Liberation Army and Partisan Detachments of Slovenia, including the commandant of the battalion, the people's hero Vladimir "Lado" Dolničar, a.k.a. Rudi, fell in a battle with the Italians, Germans, and Home Guard." Dolničar committed suicide after being seriously injured in order to evade capture.
