= Hrastenice =

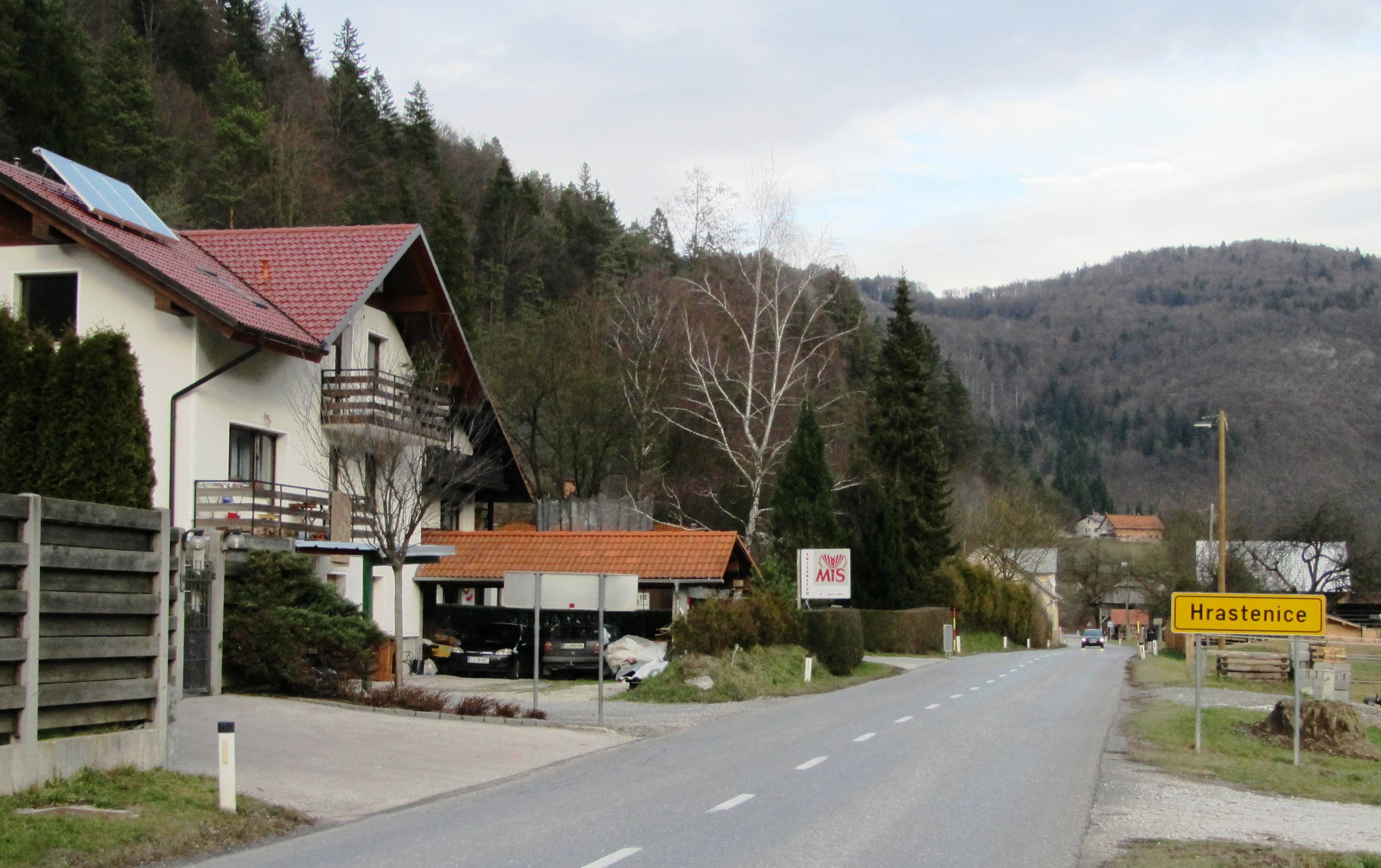

- Location in Slovenia
- Coordinates: 46°4′22.43″N 14°22′35.83″E
- Country: Slovenia
- Traditional region: Upper Carniola
- Statistical region: Central Slovenia
- Municipality: Dobrova–Polhov Gradec

Area
  - Total: 1.05 km^{2} (0.41 sq mi)
- Elevation: 325.8 m (1,069 ft)

Population (2020)
  - Total: 37
  - Density: 35/km^{2} (91/sq mi)

Hrastenice (pronounced [xɾastɛˈniːtsɛ]) is a small settlement northwest of Dobrova in the Municipality of Dobrova–Polhov Gradec in the Upper Carniola region of Slovenia. It lies on the road from Ljubljana to Polhov Gradec above the Gradaščica River.

== Name ==
The name Hrastenice is derived from the word hrast 'oak'. Like similar names (e.g., Hrastje, Hrastovica, Hrastnik), it originally referred to the local vegetation. In the past it was known as Krestenitze in German.

== History ==
Just east of Hrastenice above the Gradaščica River there was an engagement between Partisan and Italian forces in 1942. A plaque at the place reads: "At this site on 7 May 1942 a battalion of the village defense forces of this zone attacked an Italian column and destroyed a large number of the occupying force's soldiers and officers, including the regimental commander." The Italian losses numbered 36 dead and missing, including a lieutenant colonel, and 82 wounded soldiers and officers.

== Notable people ==
Notable people that were born or lived in Hrastenice include:

- Matija Ambrožič (1889–1966), technical writer and physician
