= Komanija =

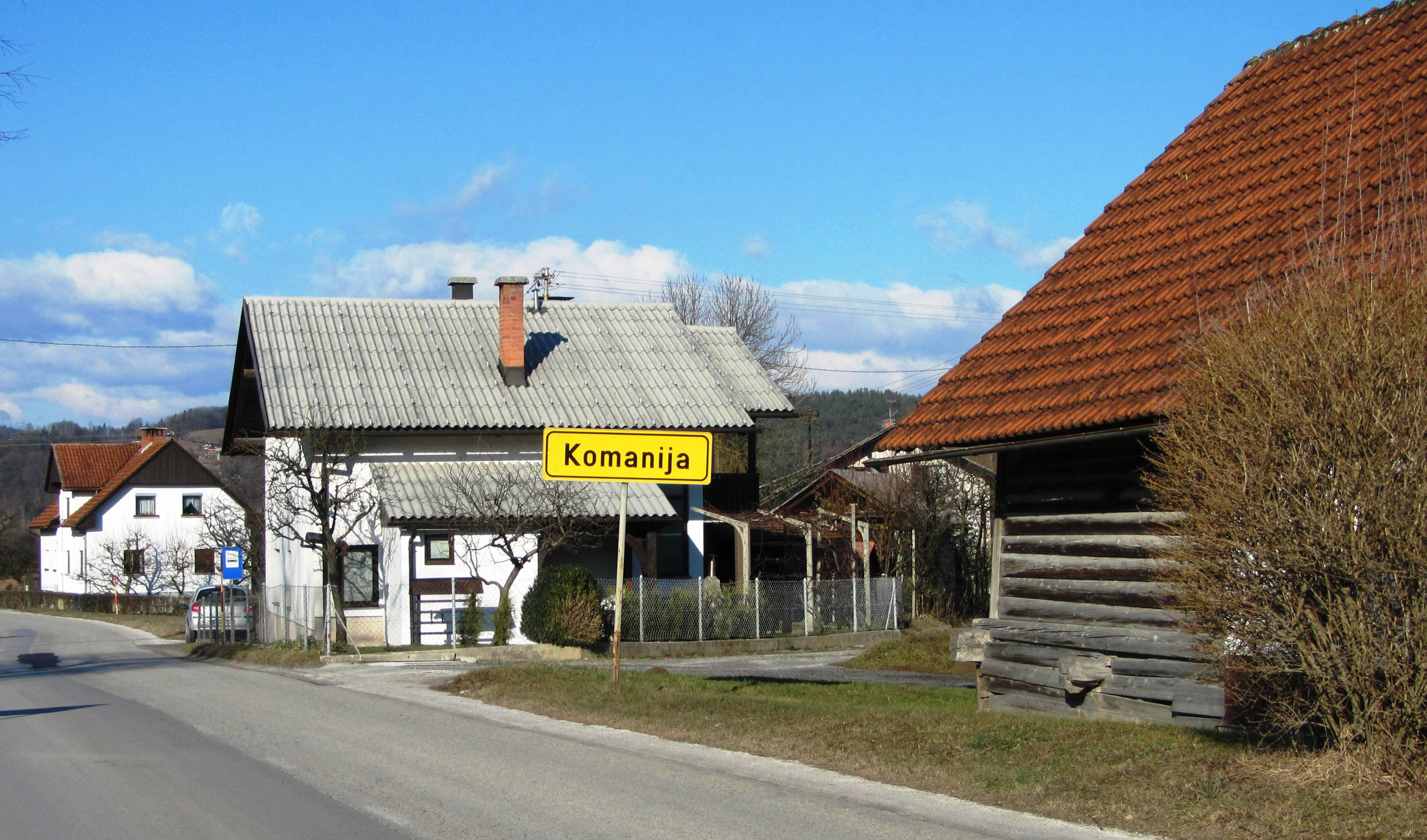

- Location in Slovenia
- Coordinates: 46°2′41.05″N 14°25′43.97″E
- Country: Slovenia
- Traditional region: Upper Carniola
- Statistical region: Central Slovenia
- Municipality: Dobrova–Polhov Gradec

Area
  - Total: 0.4 km^{2} (0.15 sq mi)
- Elevation: 311.4 m (1,022 ft)

Population (2020)
  - Total: 86
  - Density: 220/km^{2} (560/sq mi)

Komanija (pronounced [kɔmaˈniːja], German: Komania) is a small settlement south of Dobrova in the Municipality of Dobrova–Polhov Gradec in the Upper Carniola region of Slovenia.

== Geography ==
Komanija lies along the local road from Razori to Brezovica pri Ljubljani. The core of the village stands in a shady position on a broad terrace above a plain, and it extends up the slope of Gradišča Hill (530 meters or 1,740 feet) to the west and down to Horjulščica Creek (a.k.a. Horjulka Creek, a tributary of the Gradaščica) to the east.

== Notable people ==
Notable people that were born or lived in Komanija include:

- Josip Marinko (1848–1921), editor and journalist
