= Municipality of Dobrova–Polhov Gradec =

Municipality of Slovenia

Municipality of Dobrova–Polhov Gradec Občina Dobrova - Polhov Gradec
- Municipality
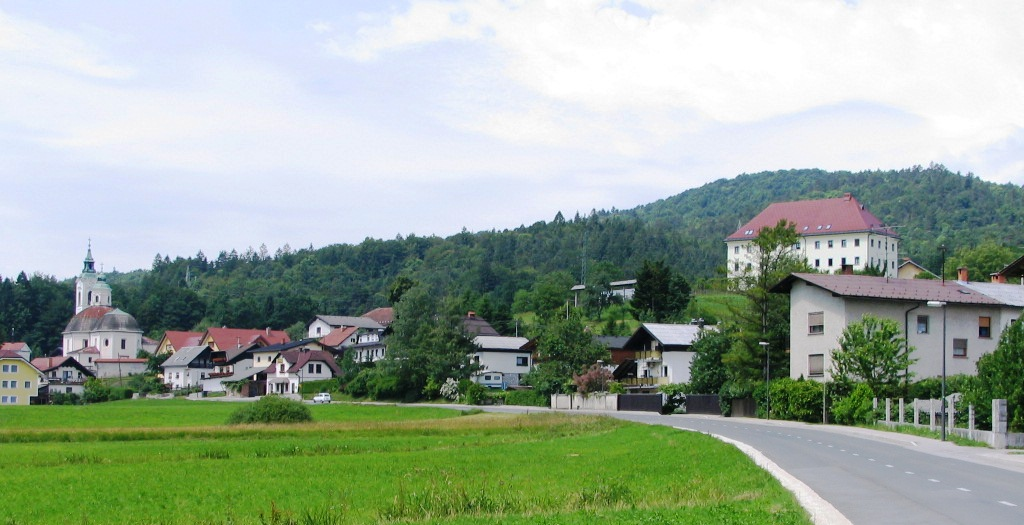
- Dobrova

- Location of the Municipality of Dobrova–Polhov Gradec in Slovenia
- Coordinates: 46°03′N 14°18′E
- Country: Slovenia

Government
  - Mayor: Jure Dolinar (Independent)

Area
  - Total: 117.5 km^{2} (45.4 sq mi)

Population (2002)
  - Total: 6,691
  - Density: 56.94/km^{2} (147.5/sq mi)
- Time zone: UTC+01 (CET)
  - Summer (DST): UTC+02 (CEST)
- Website: www.dobrova-polhovgradec.si

The Municipality of Dobrova–Polhov Gradec (pronounced [ˈdoːbɾɔʋa ˈpou̯ːxou̯ ˈɡɾaːdəts]; Slovene: Občina Dobrova - Polhov Gradec) is a municipality in Slovenia. Its administrative seat is Dobrova.

== History ==
Originally, according to the Establishment of Municipalities and Municipal Boundaries Act that came into effect on 1 January 1995, the municipality also included the town of Horjul and was named the Municipality of Dobrova–Horjul–Polhov Gradec (Občina Dobrova - Horjul - Polhov Gradec). After a ruling by the Slovene Constitutional Court, the local community of the town of Horjul gained its own municipality in 1998, named the Municipality of Horjul.

== Settlements ==
In addition to the municipal seat of Dobrova, the municipality also includes the following settlements:

- Babna Gora
- Belica
- Brezje pri Dobrovi
- Briše pri Polhovem Gradcu
- Butajnova
- Črni Vrh
- Dolenja Vas pri Polhovem Gradcu
- Draževnik
- Dvor pri Polhovem Gradcu
- Gabrje
- Hrastenice
- Hruševo
- Komanija
- Log pri Polhovem Gradcu
- Osredek pri Dobrovi
- Planina nad Horjulom
- Podreber
- Podsmreka
- Polhov Gradec
- Praproče
- Pristava pri Polhovem Gradcu
- Razori
- Rovt
- Selo nad Polhovim Gradcem
- Šentjošt nad Horjulom
- Setnica
- Setnik
- Smolnik
- Srednja Vas pri Polhovem Gradcu
- Srednji Vrh
- Stranska Vas
- Šujica

== Notable people ==
Notable people that were born or lived in the Municipality of Dobrova–Polhov Gradec include:

- Emil Adamič (1877–1936), composer
- Cardinal Aloysius Ambrozic (1930–2011), archbishop of Toronto
- James Trobec (1838–1921), bishop of Saint Cloud, Minnesota
