= Stranska Vas, Dobrova–Polhov Gradec =

Stranska Vas
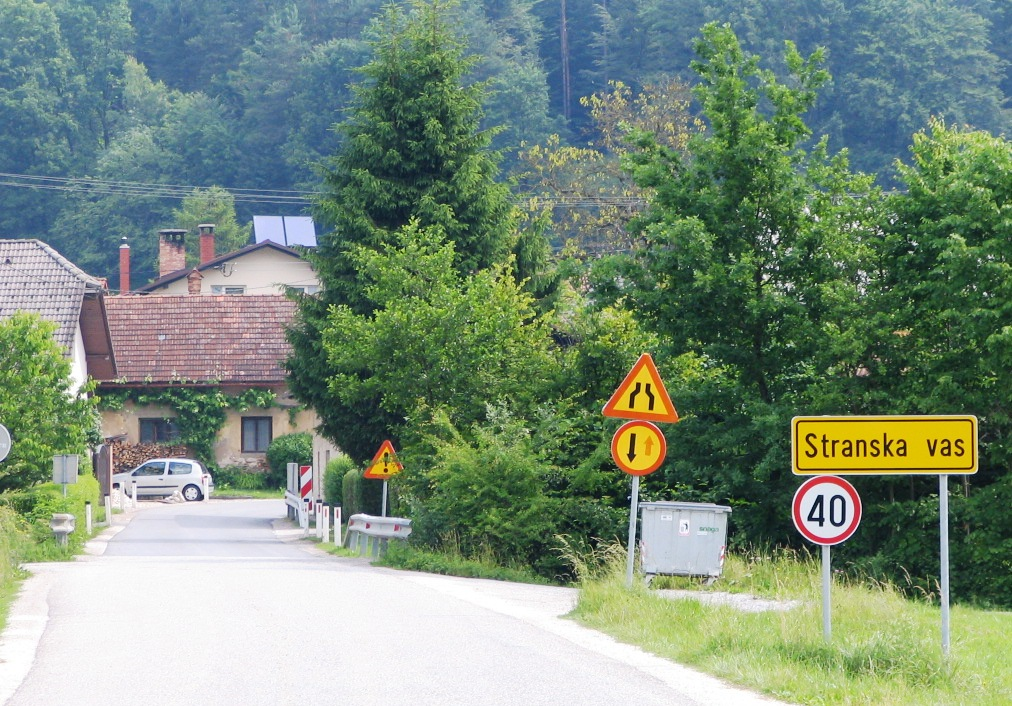

- Location in Slovenia
- Coordinates: 46°3′39.25″N 14°25′21.5″E
- Country: Slovenia
- Traditional region: Upper Carniola
- Statistical region: Central Slovenia
- Municipality: Dobrova–Polhov Gradec

Area
  - Total: 2.21 km^{2} (0.85 sq mi)
- Elevation: 310.7 m (1,019 ft)

Population (2020)
  - Total: 279
  - Density: 126/km^{2} (327/sq mi)

Stranska Vas (pronounced [ˈstɾaːnska ˈʋaːs]; Slovenian: Stranska vas) is a clustered village northeast of Dobrova in the Municipality of Dobrova–Polhov Gradec in the Upper Carniola region of Slovenia.

== Geography ==
Stranska Vas lies on the road between Dobrova and Šentvid, Ljubljana on the left bank of Ostrožnik Creek, a tributary of the Gradaščica River. It extends south to the Gradaščica River, northeast up the slope of Utik Hill, and north across Čep Creek (Slovene: Čepski graben, a tributary of the Ostrožnik) and through the Šujica Woods (Šujski gozd) to the upper course of Ostrožnik Creek beyond Krašec Hill (393 m). The village includes the hamlet of Utik.

== Name ==
Stranska Vas was first mentioned in 1376 under the semi-German name Strandörf (Strandorff in 1414, Stranstorff in 1431). In the past it was known as Stranskawaß in German. The name literally means 'village on the side' and is derived from the Slovene word stran 'side', referring to the location of the settlement on the slope of a hill.

== Architectural heritage ==
The wayside shrine southwest of the village, on the road to Dobrova, is protected as a cultural heritage monument. It dates from the 19th century (renovated in 1997) and is dedicated to the Virgin Mary.

== Gallery ==
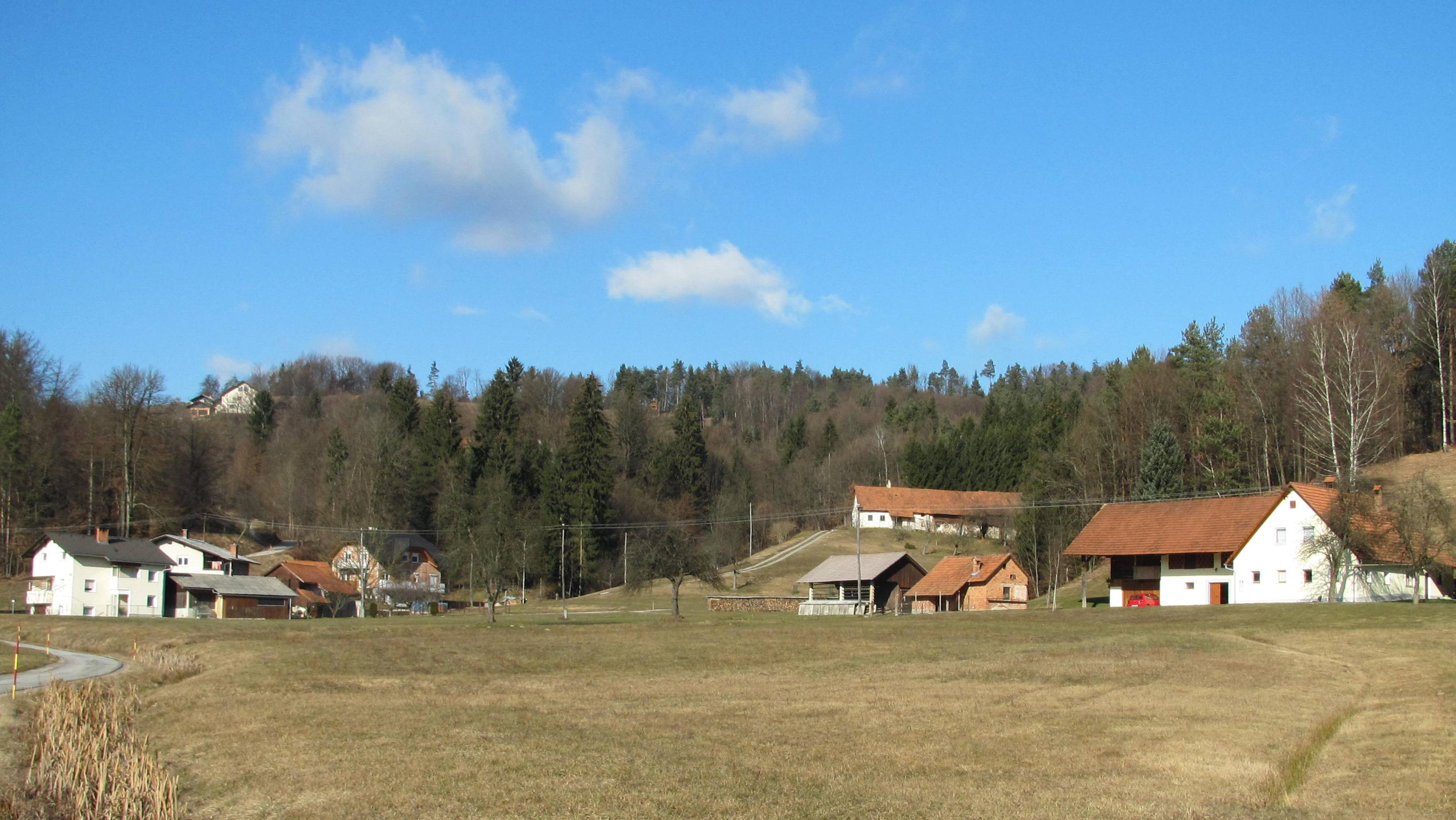
The hamlet of Utik in Stranska Vas

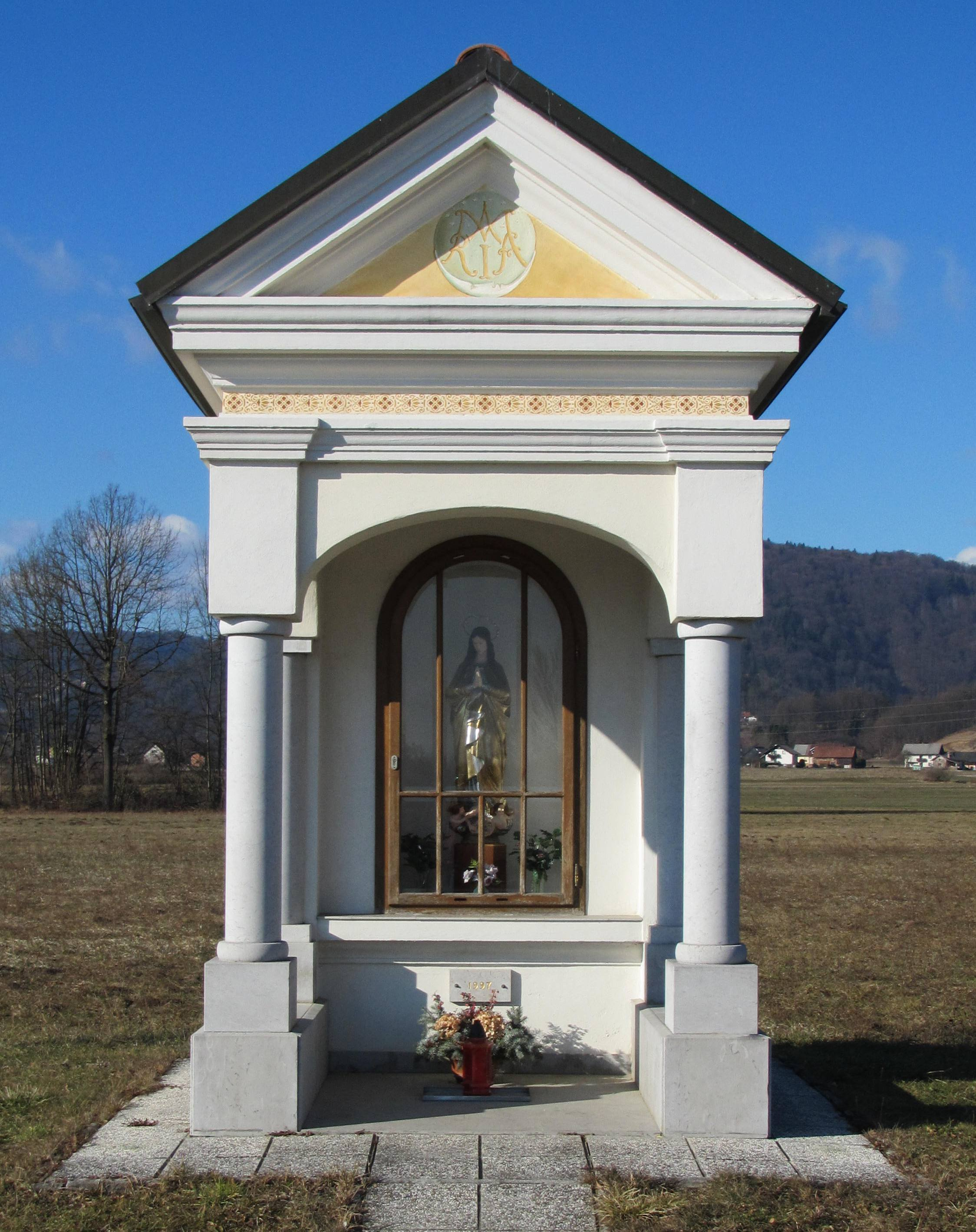
Wayside shrine in Stranska Vas
