= Razori =

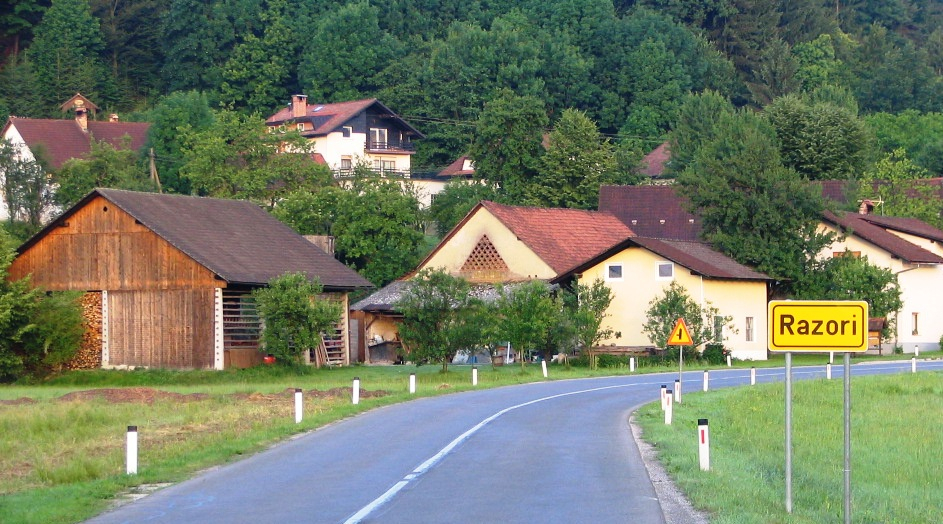

- Location in Slovenia
- Coordinates: 46°3′2.68″N 14°25′27.93″E
- Country: Slovenia
- Traditional region: Upper Carniola
- Statistical region: Central Slovenia
- Municipality: Dobrova–Polhov Gradec

Area
  - Total: 0.63 km^{2} (0.24 sq mi)
- Elevation: 305.9 m (1,004 ft)

Population (2020)
  - Total: 105
  - Density: 170/km^{2} (430/sq mi)

Razori (pronounced [ɾaˈzoːɾi]; in older sources also Rozore) is a small clustered village on the right bank of Horjulščica Creek (a.k.a. Horjulka Creek) near Dobrova in the Municipality of Dobrova–Polhov Gradec in the Upper Carniola region of Slovenia. There are springs in the area and a water reservoir for Dobrova lies above the village. Historically the village's economy was oriented toward dairy farming and vegetable production, as well as fruit growing (apples and pears) and brandy production.

== Name ==
Razori was first mentioned in written records in 1736 as ex Rosor, and later as ex Rosora (in 1745) and ex Raſsorie (in 1747). In the past it was known as Rosore in German. The name Razori is a plural form of the common noun razor 'dead furrow'. The name probably does not refer to agricultural activity, but is instead metaphorical, referring to split or fissured terrain.

== Cultural heritage ==
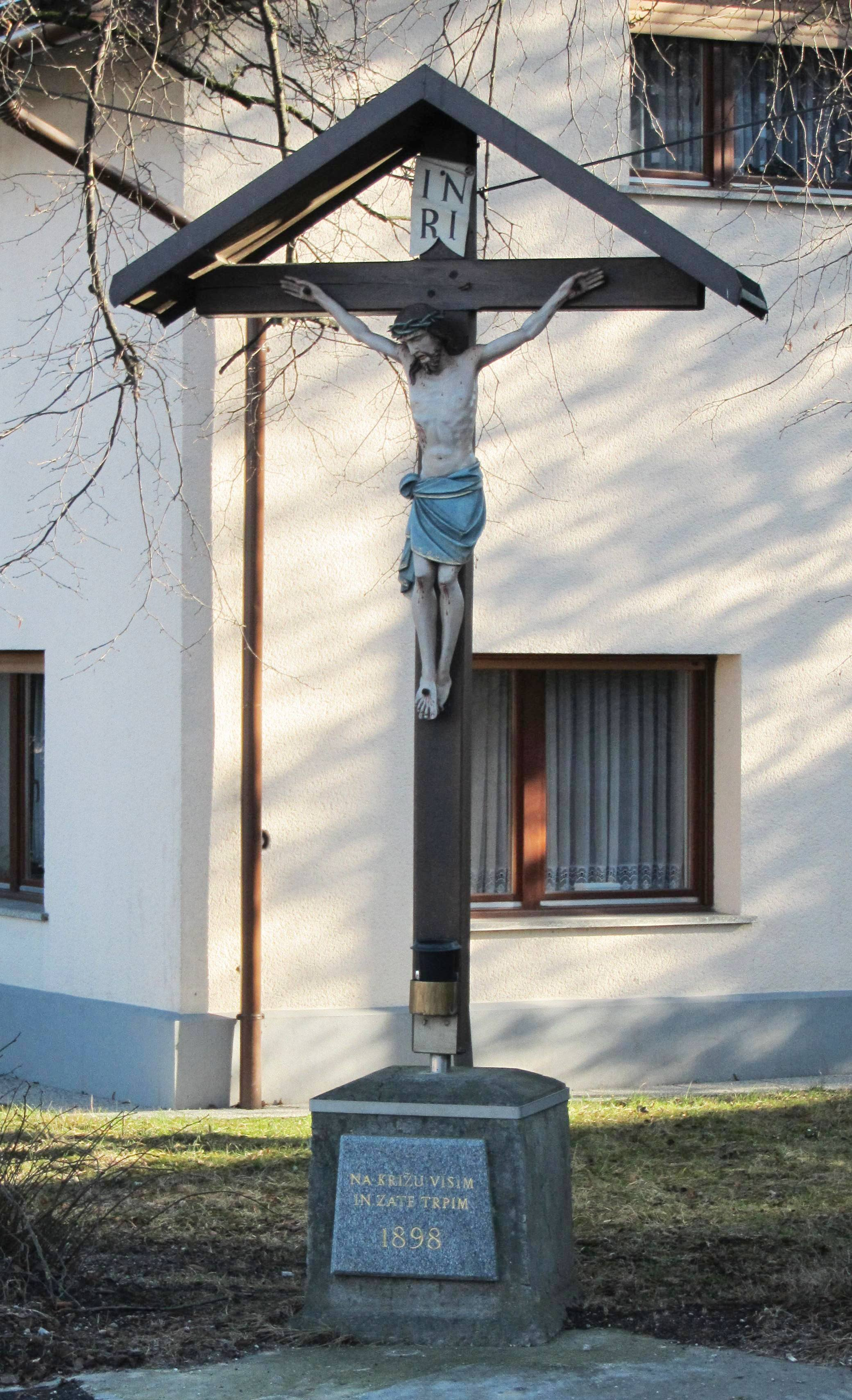
Wayside shrine in Razori

A wayside shrine in the form of a large wooden crucifix stands in the center of the village, near the intersection of the road to Brezovica pri Ljubljani with the road from Dobrova to Ljubljana. The inscription on the plaque at the base of the crucifix reads Na križu visim in zate trpim. 1898 ('I hang on the cross and I suffer for you. 1898.') The crucifix has been registered as cultural heritage.

== History ==
At the beginning of July 1942, Italian forces burned several buildings in the village.
