= Polhov Gradec =

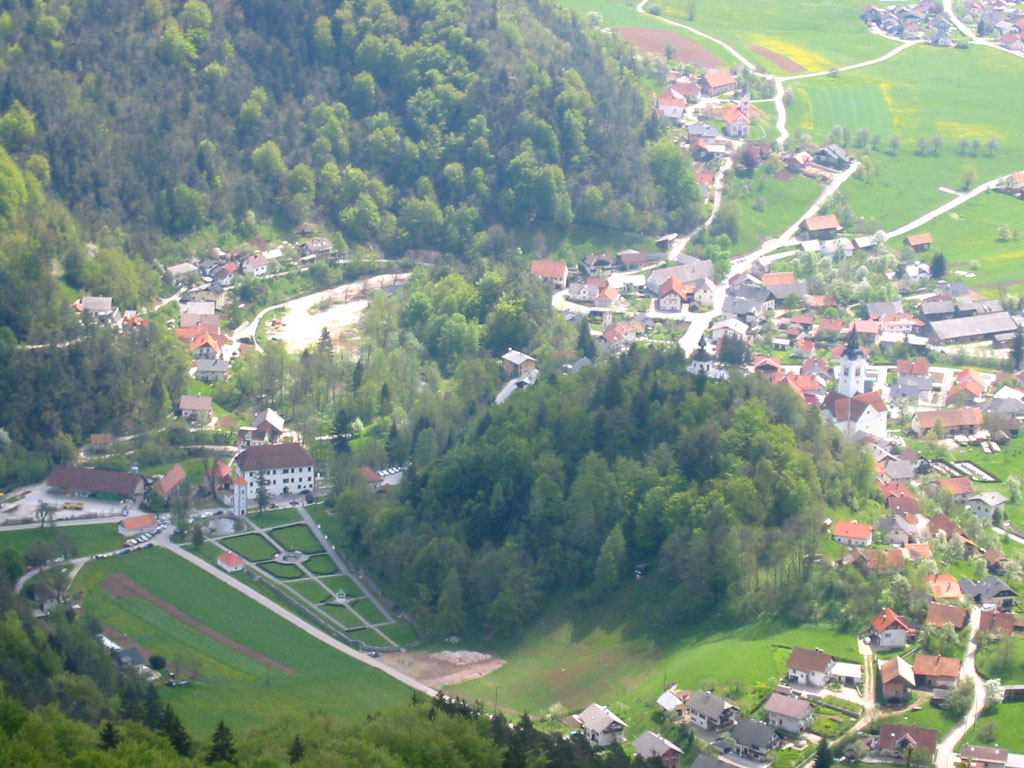

- Location in Slovenia
- Coordinates: 46°3′55″N 14°18′45″E
- Country: Slovenia
- Traditional region: Upper Carniola
- Statistical region: Central Slovenia
- Municipality: Dobrova–Polhov Gradec

Area
  - Total: 3.92 km^{2} (1.51 sq mi)
- Elevation: 373.6 m (1,226 ft)

Population (2020)
  - Total: 618
  - Density: 158/km^{2} (408/sq mi)

Polhov Gradec (pronounced [ˈpou̯ːxou̯ ˈɡɾaːdəts]; German: Billichgra(t)z) is a settlement in the Municipality of Dobrova–Polhov Gradec in the Upper Carniola region of Slovenia. It is the center of the Upper Gradaščica Valley.

== Name ==
Polhov Gradec was first mentioned in written records under the German name Pilchgrez in 1261 (Pilchgraez in 1269, and simply Graetz in 1291; cf. modern-era German Billichgra(t)z). All of these are derived from the Slovene name for the settlement, with the last element ‑grätz derived from Slovene gradec 'little castle'. The first part of the name is derived from a personal name, Polh or Povh; the name therefore means 'Polh's (little) castle'. The name Polh is, in turn, probably derived from the zoonym polh 'dormouse'. An alternative theory, considered less likely, derives Polh from the name Pavel 'Paul'.

A folk legend offers a more fanciful, but unfounded, explanation of the name of the settlement. According to the legend, which is reproduced in material for tourists, a traveler once spent the night at Polhov Gradec Castle. When he woke up in the morning he found that the dormice had eaten his horse's saddle and bridle, causing him to exclaim, "To ni Gradec, temveč Polhov Gradec!" ('This isn't a castle, it's a dormouse castle!').

== History ==
The area has been inhabited since Roman times and a Roman villa has been excavated near the town, finds from which are kept in the National Museum of Slovenia. A court was established in Polhov Gradec in 1478, which was placed under the jurisdiction of the sovereign in 1474. In 1515 the area was engulfed in a peasant uprising. A part-time school was established in 1820 and a regular school in 1852. The first school building was built in 1859.

== Polhov Gradec Castle ==
Polhov Gradec Castle (Polhograjska graščina) is a large mansion in the settlement. The manor was first mentioned in written sources in 1315. The manor was purchased by Mark Anton Kunstl von Baumgarten in 1658. Kunstl was elevated to the position of Baron of Billichgratz in 1684, and the manor's Neptune Fountain was created under Kunstl's ownership. At the beginning of the 19th century ownership passed through by virtue of marriage to the Counts Ursini von Blagay. In 1875 Janko and Luiza (Altmann) Urbančič from Preddvor purchased the estate, after which it was owned by their daughter Ana Urbančič Delago. The Delago family was forcibly deported to Austria by the Yugoslav Secret Police (OZNA) on 18 December 1945 and the manor was then nationalized and plundered. The building housed an elementary school from 1952 to 1969, and was then left to decay until the 1990s, when renovation started. In 1999 it was declared a cultural monument of national significance, and in 2008 management of the estate was transferred to the Technical Museum of Slovenia. Since 2008, the Museum of Post and Telecommunications has operated there.

== Nativity of Mary Church ==
The parish church in the town is dedicated to Nativity of Mary. It is mentioned as an independent parish in documents dating to 1292. It originally belonged to the Patriarchate of Aquileia and since 1461 it has been part of the Archdiocese of Ljubljana. The actual church building dates to 1736, after the old church burned in 1728 and had to be completely demolished. It was extensively renovated in 2000.

== Notable people ==
Notable people that were born or lived in Polhov Gradec include:

- Anton Bajec (1897–1985), linguist
- Count Rihard Ursini Blagaj (1786–1858), botanist, patron of the arts, and first mayor of Polhov Gradec
- Martin Pegius (early 16th century–1592), lawyer and astrologist
- Franc Rihar (1858–1919), religious writer
- Jožef Rihar (1759–1807), Bible translator
- Luidgarda (or Luitgarda) Rihar (1862–1923), Ursuline sister and head of the Ljubljana Girls' Home Economics School
- Paul J. Sifler (born Pavel Gerjol; 1911–2001), Slovenian-American composer, son of organ builder Ivan Kacin
- Andrej Skopec (a.k.a. Andrew Skopez; 1802–1887), missionary to the United States
- Drago Stepišnik (1906–1972), historian of physical education
- Jernej Trnovec (1846–1933), sculptor, born in Setnica and resided in Polhov Gradec

== Gallery ==
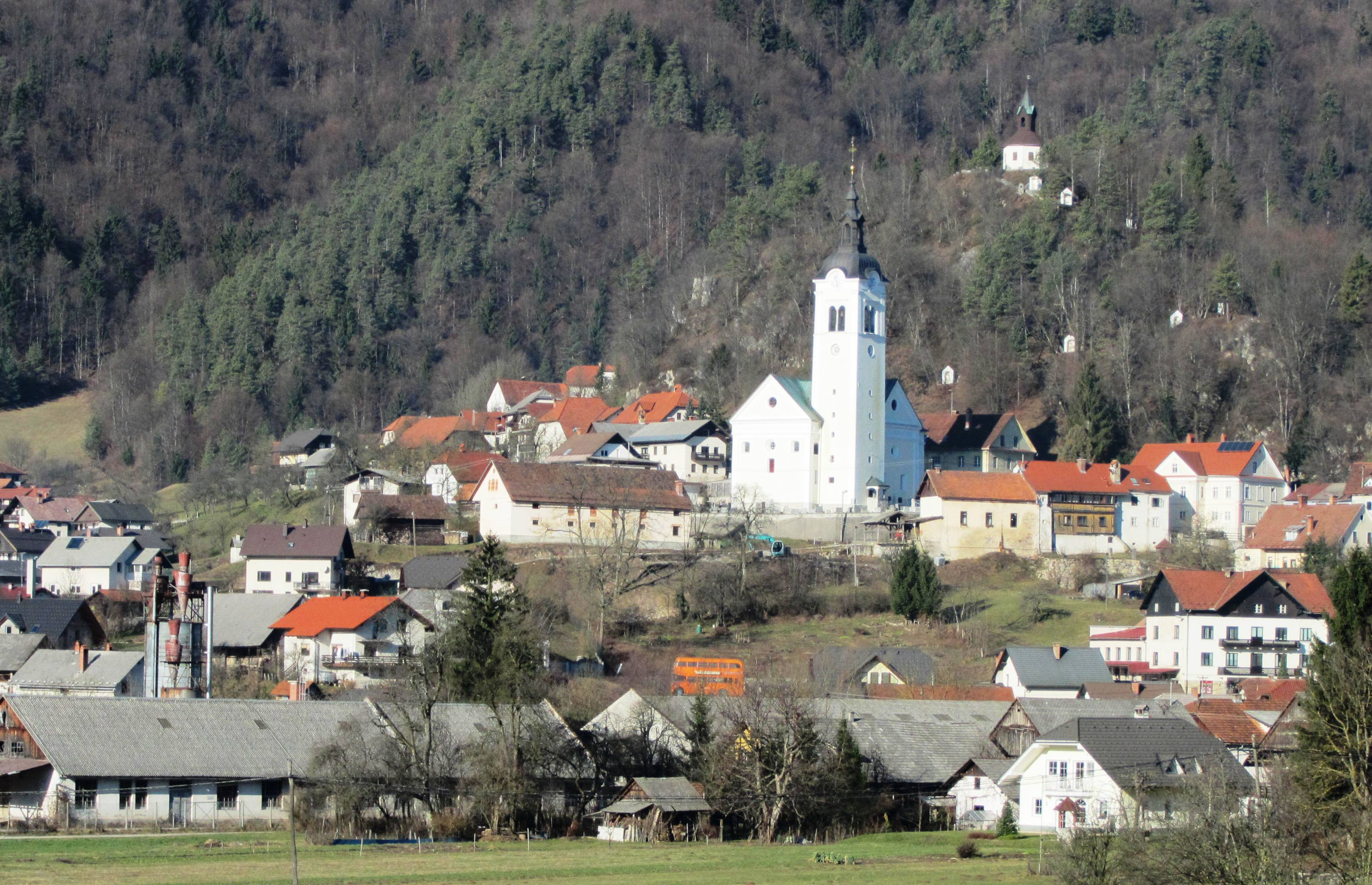
Polhov Gradec: Birth of the Virgin Church (center), Calvary Chapel (upper right)

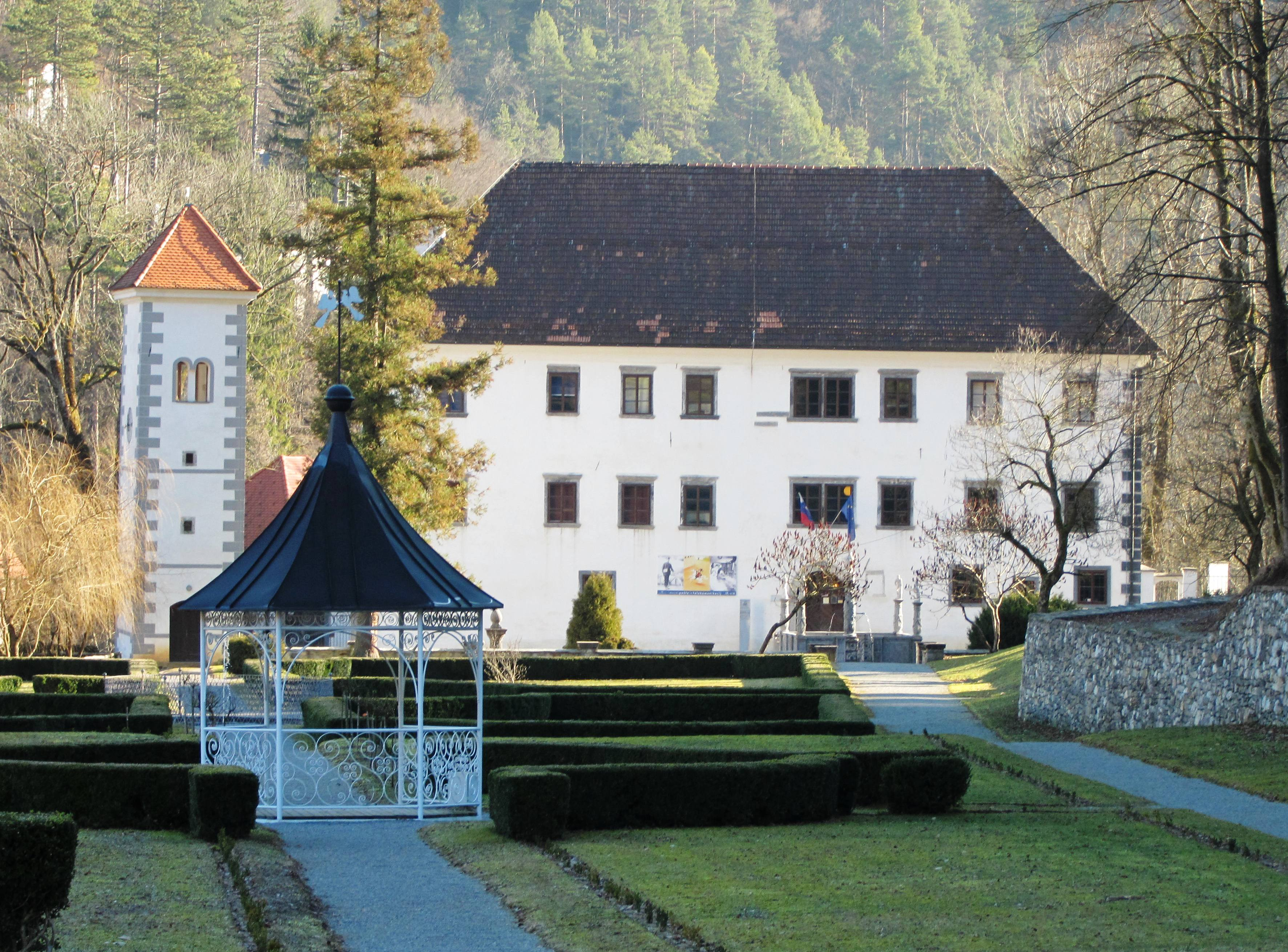
Polhov Gradec Castle

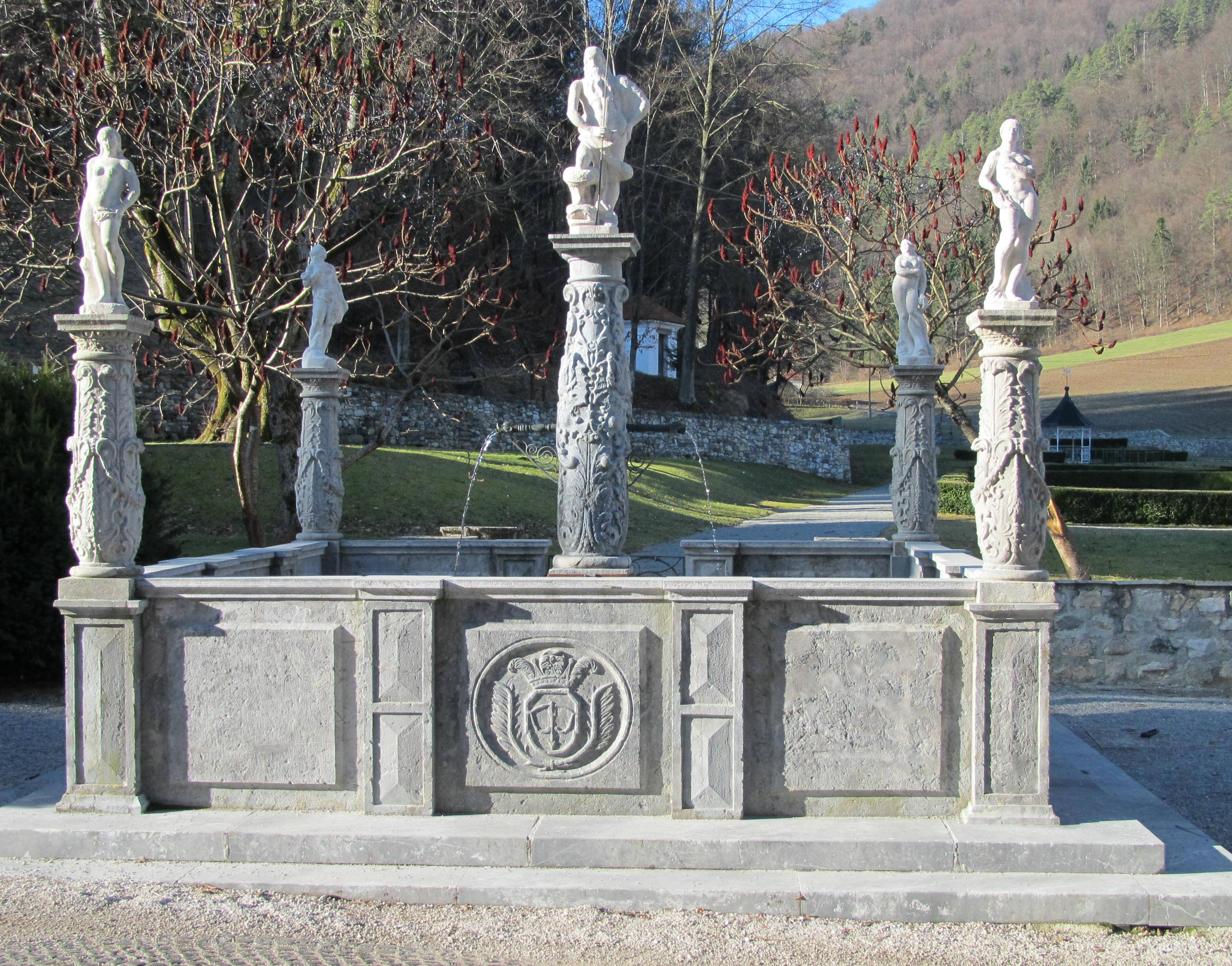
The Neptune Fountain at Polhov Gradec Manor

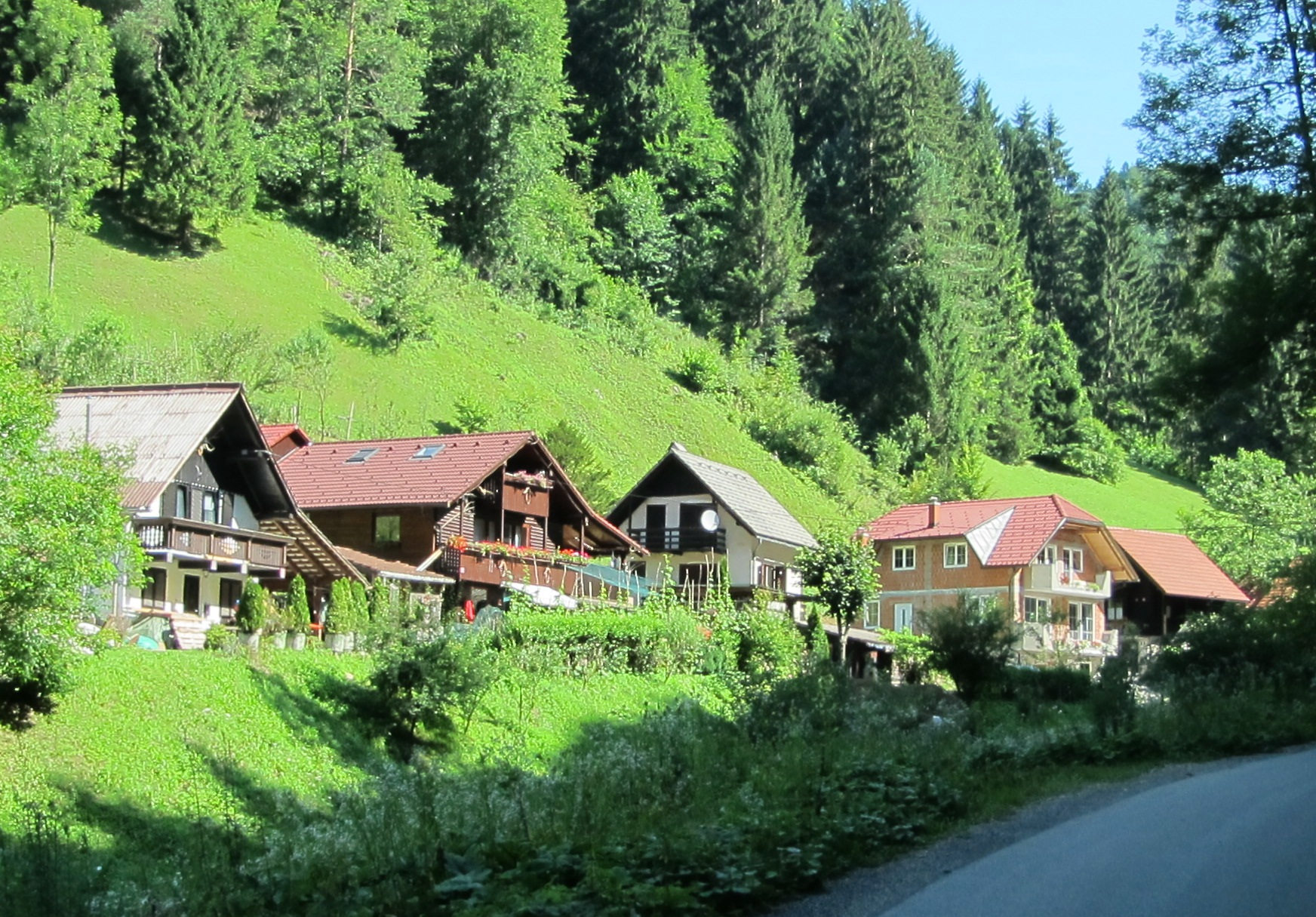
The hamlet of Skira in the Maček Gorge (Mačkov graben)
