= Ljubgojna =

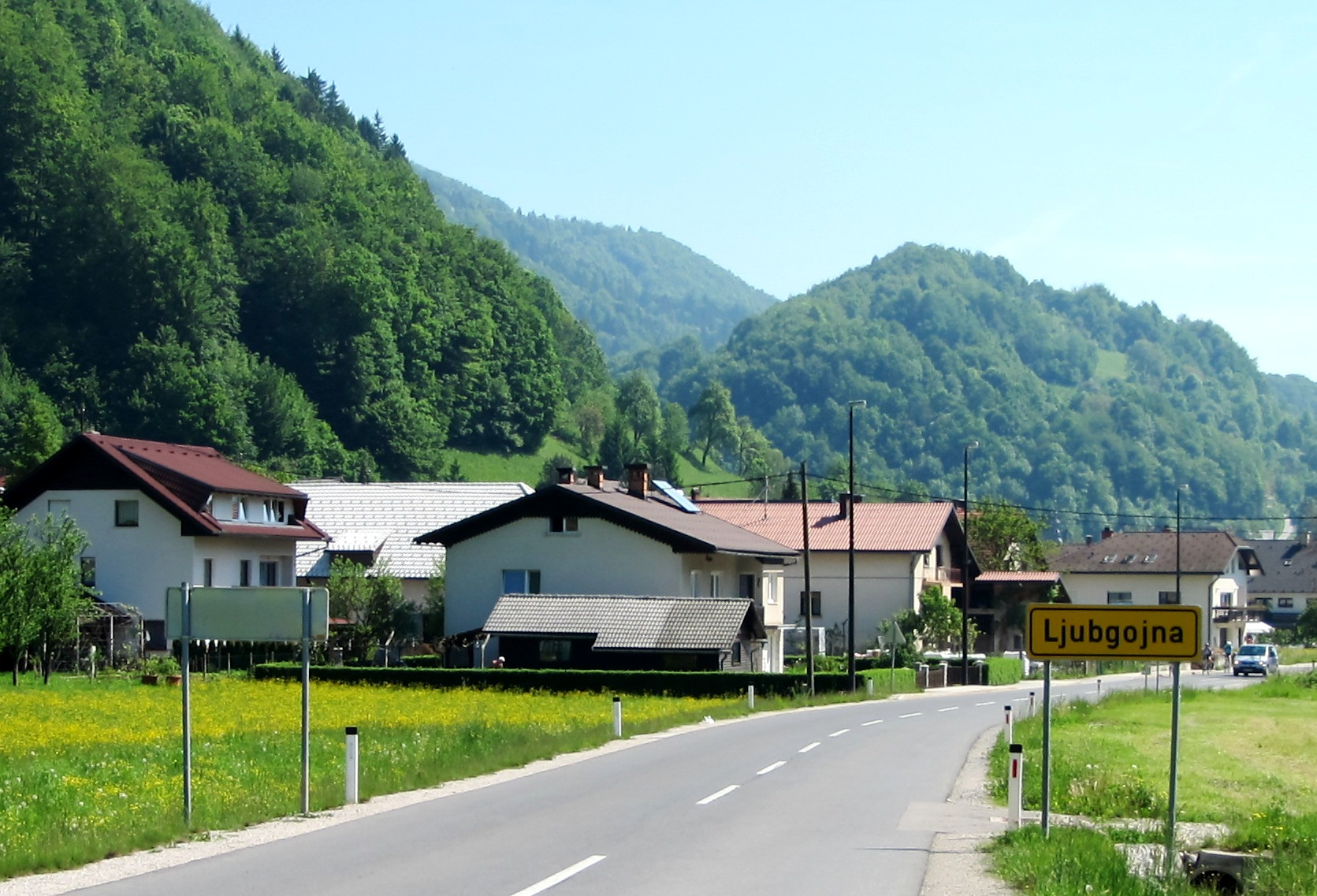

- Location in Slovenia
- Coordinates: 46°1′18.87″N 14°17′19.39″E
- Country: Slovenia
- Traditional region: Inner Carniola
- Statistical region: Central Slovenia
- Municipality: Horjul

Area
  - Total: 0.85 km^{2} (0.33 sq mi)
- Elevation: 347.1 m (1,139 ft)

Population (2024)
  - Total: 133

Ljubgojna (pronounced [ljubˈɡɔːi̯na]) is a settlement west of Horjul in the Inner Carniola region of Slovenia.

== Name ==
Ljubgojna was attested in written sources in 1303 as Lvblgoyn (and as Lubligoy in 1347 and Lubigon in 1427). It is derived from the Slavic personal name *Ľubogojь, thus originally meaning 'Ľubogojь's settlement'. Locally, Ljubgojna is known as Ligojna—which, however, is etymologically distinct from nearby Velika Ligojna and Mala Ligojna.

== History ==
During the Second World War, the Partisans murdered the mayor of Horjul, Janez Bastič, near Ljubgojna on 14 June 1942. Tensions were increased when Partisan soldiers from the Second Detachment Group crossed the railroad line near Verd and took up positions in Žažar on 28 June, 3 km southwest of Ljubgojna. The newly founded Partisan Dolomite Detachment received orders to protect the advance of the Second Detachment Group and fired on Italian forces at Ljubgojna on 1 July. The Italians responded by burning the entire village to the ground, including the home of the late Mayor Bastič.
