= Zaklanec =

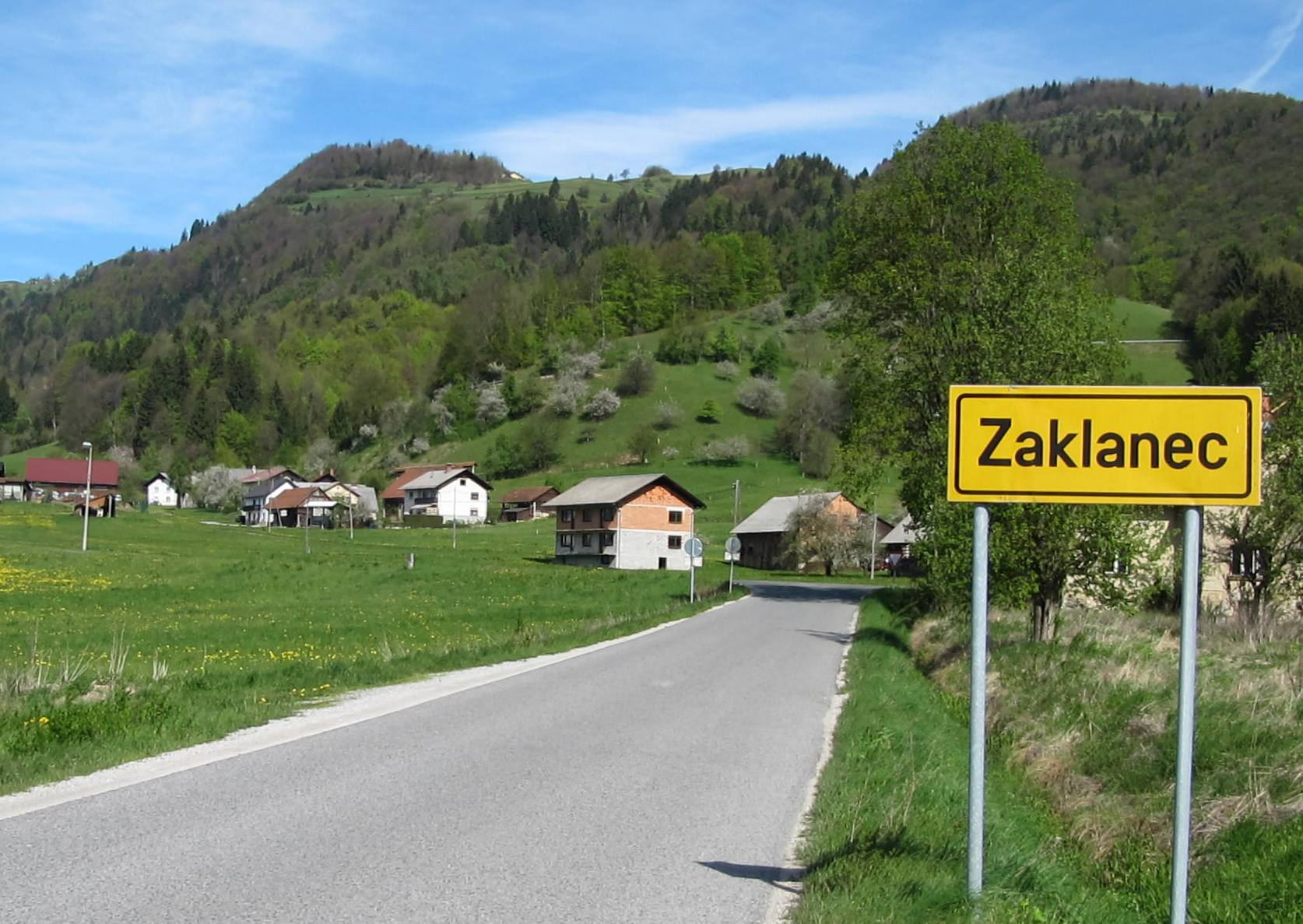

- Location in Slovenia
- Coordinates: 46°1′25.28″N 14°18′53.7″E
- Country: Slovenia
- Traditional region: Inner Carniola
- Statistical region: Central Slovenia
- Municipality: Horjul

Area
  - Total: 2.88 km^{2} (1.11 sq mi)
- Elevation: 344.9 m (1,132 ft)

Population (2002)
  - Total: 191

Zaklanec (pronounced [zaˈklaːnəts]; German: Saklanz) is a village east of Horjul in the Inner Carniola region of Slovenia.

== History ==
The houses in the village are relatively new buildings because the entire village burned down in a fire in 1920 and was also bombed by the Germans during the Second World War after the capitulation of Italy in 1943. On November 20, 1942, the Partisans abducted and killed seven people from Zaklanec in the Broad Creek Gorge (Slovene: Široki potok) in nearby Dobrova.

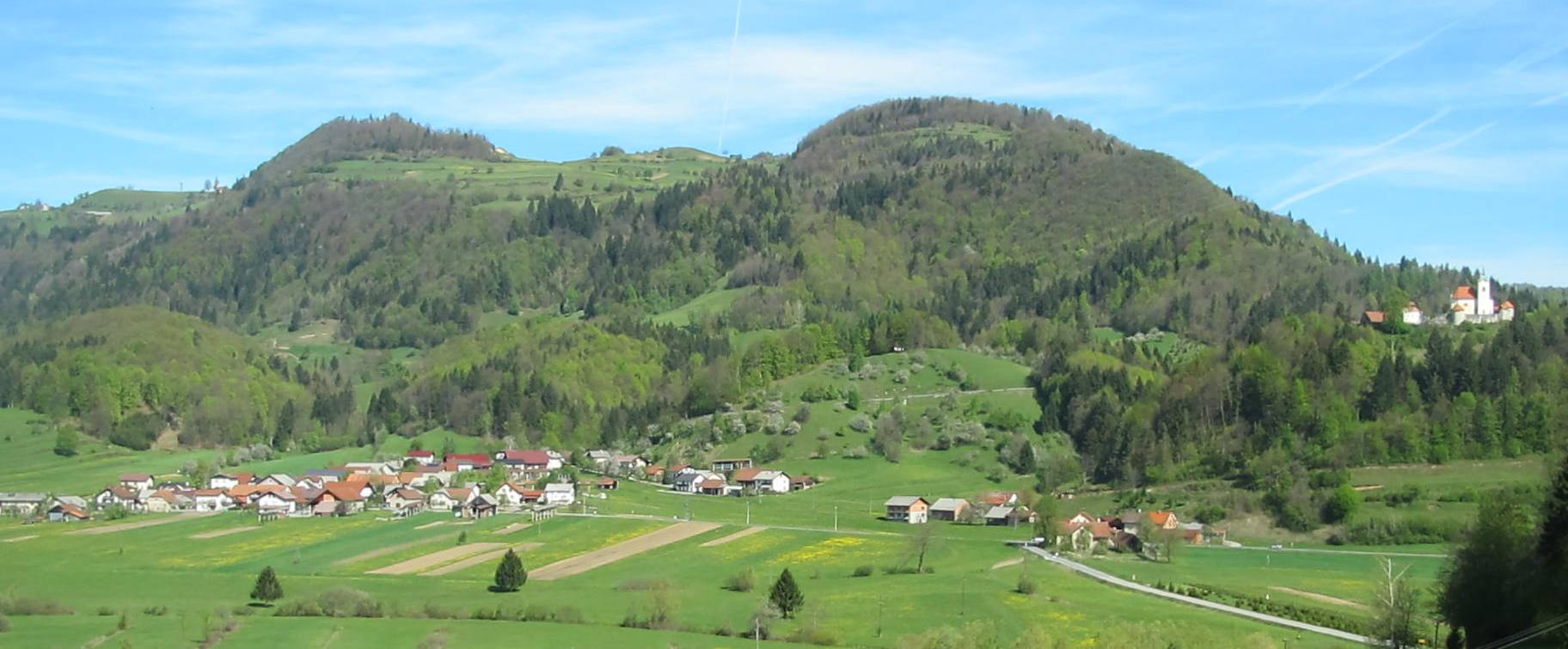
Zaklanec (left) with St. Ulrich's Church in neighboring Podolnica (right)
