= Konfin =

Konfin may refer to:

- Konfin, Prevlaka, a cape in the southernmost part of Croatia near the border with Montenegro
- Konfin, Slovenia, a hamlet of Sveta Trojica, Domžale
- Konfin archaeological site, near Žažar, Slovenia

== See also ==
- Konfin Shaft 1 Mass Grave, located near Glažuta, Loški Potok, Slovenia
