= Vrzdenec =

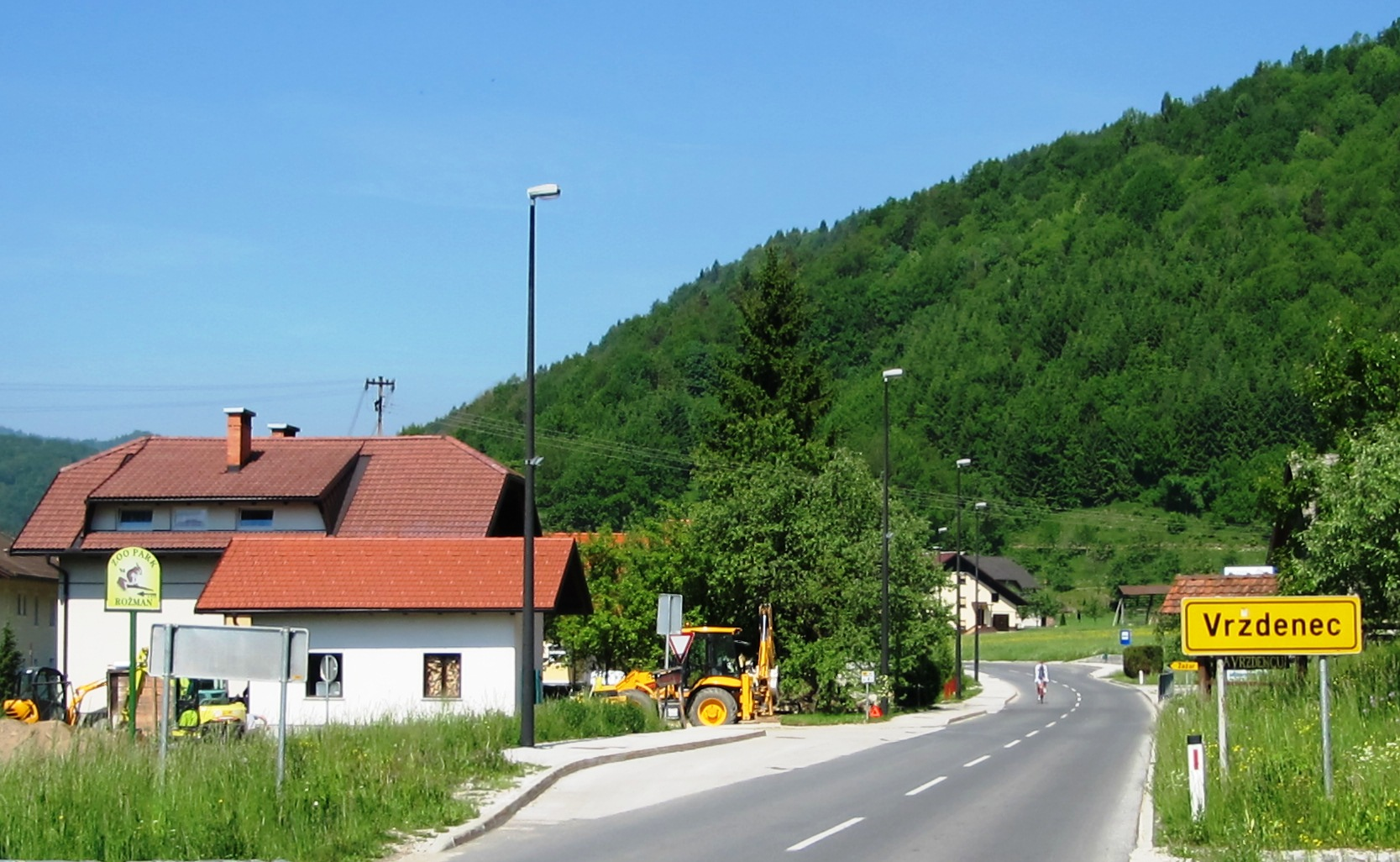

- Location in Slovenia
- Coordinates: 46°1′10.61″N 14°16′1.38″E
- Country: Slovenia
- Traditional region: Inner Carniola
- Statistical region: Central Slovenia
- Municipality: Horjul

Area
  - Total: 5.72 km^{2} (2.21 sq mi)
- Elevation: 360.8 m (1,184 ft)

Population (2002)
  - Total: 462

Vrzdenec (pronounced [ʋəɾˈzdɛːnəts]; German: Schönbrunn) is a village west of Horjul in the Inner Carniola region of Slovenia. It includes the hamlets of Gošavje, Kisovnik, and Zagorica.

== Geography ==
Vrzdenec is a clustered village on a small rise above the marshy Šujica Valley. Prominent elevations in the area include Reber Hill (480 m) to the north, and Baš Hill (Slovene: Bašev grič, 420 m) and Tičina Hill (380 m) to the east. There are several springs in the area. Sopošče Spring has its source above the church and serves as the water supply for the village. There is another spring below the village, and west of this are Deklevšek Spring and Jazba Spring. There are fields in higher areas of the Šujica Valley and extensive forested land. There are meadows and orchards on Baš Hill.

== Name ==
Vrzdenec was attested in written sources as Schoͤnprun in 1309, Schoͤnprunen in 1343, and Schonprun in 1453, among other spellings. The name is a fusion of the phrase *vьrxъ stъdenьca, meaning either 'above the spring' or 'source of the spring'. In the past it was known as Schönbrunn (literally, 'beautiful spring') in German.

== History ==
Prehistoric finds, including stone and bronze axes, have been found at Tabor Hill, testifying to early settlement of the area. Tabor Hill also had a fortification during the Middle Ages that served as protection against Ottoman attacks. The village came under German bombardment during the Second World War on 1 November 1943.

== Church ==
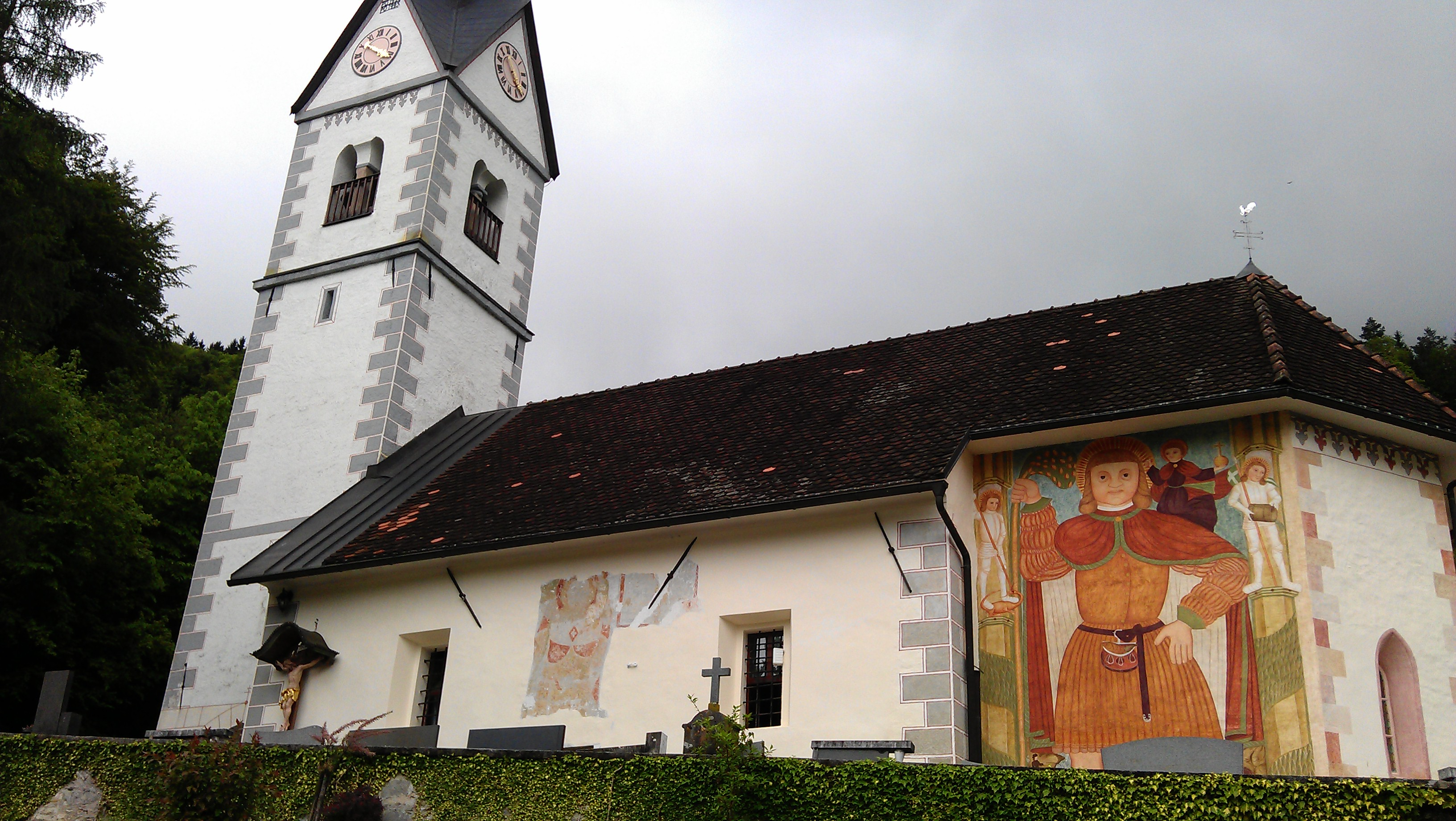
Saint Cantius church with the late 16th-century Renaissance fresco of St. Christopher

The local church in the settlement is dedicated to Saint Cantius and belongs to the Parish of Horjul. It is a Romanesque building, probably dating to the 13th century with poorly preserved traces of frescos from the 14th, 15th, and 16th centuries. The more modern wall paintings in the church are by the Slovene Impressionist painter Matej Sternen with scenes from the Life of Christ.

== Notable people ==
Notable people that were born or lived in Vrzdenec include:

- Neža Cankar (née Pivk) (1843–1897), mother of the Slovene writer Ivan Cankar
