= Koreno nad Horjulom =

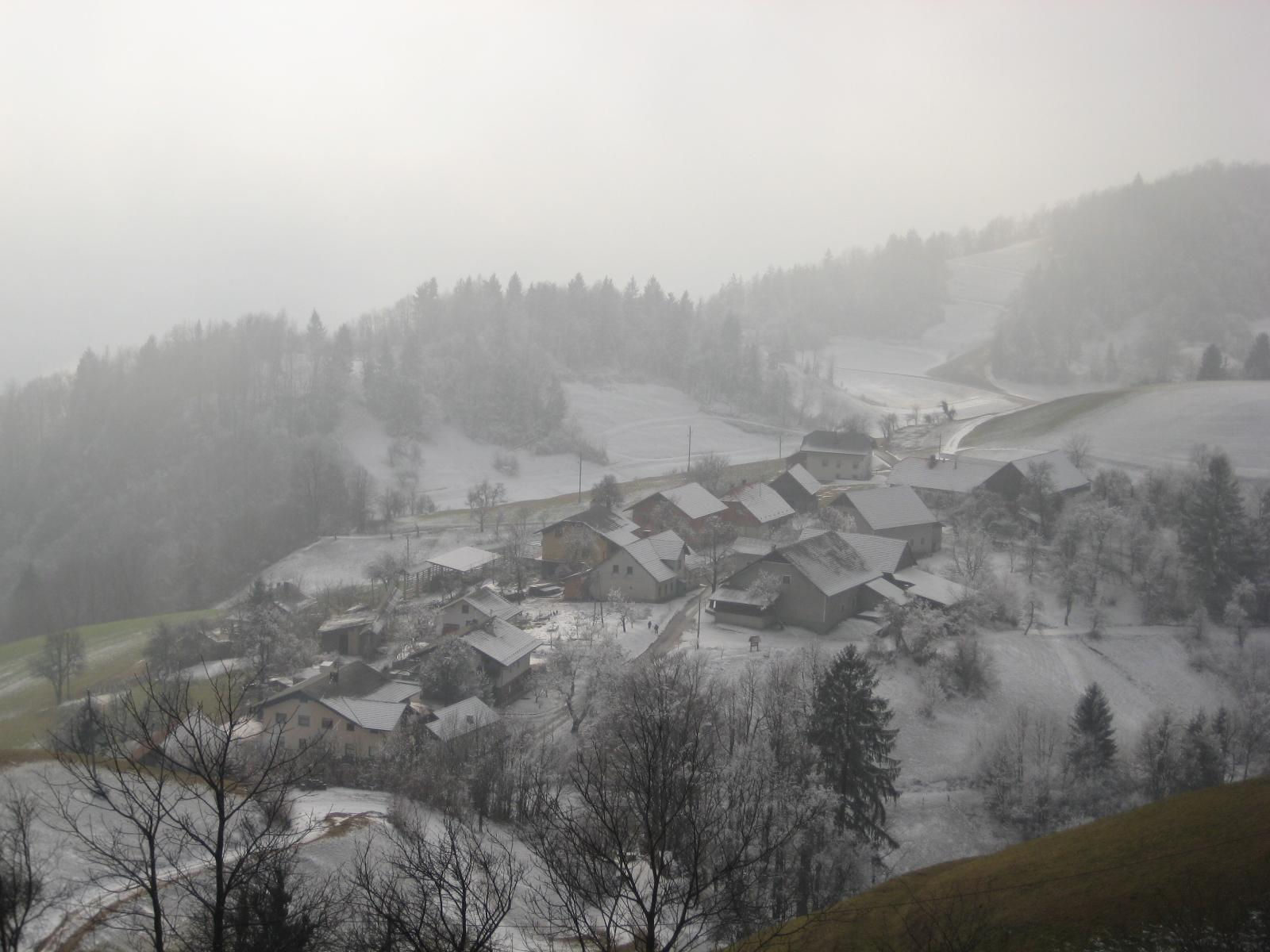

- Location in Slovenia
- Coordinates: 46°1′58.06″N 14°17′18.42″E
- Country: Slovenia
- Traditional region: Inner Carniola
- Statistical region: Central Slovenia
- Municipality: Horjul

Area
  - Total: 4.41 km^{2} (1.70 sq mi)
- Elevation: 662.3 m (2,173 ft)

Population (2002)
  - Total: 110

Koreno nad Horjulom (pronounced [kɔˈɾeːnɔ nat xɔˈrjúːlɔm]) is a settlement in the hills north of Horjul in the Inner Carniola region of Slovenia.

== Name ==
The name of the settlement was changed from Koreno to Koreno nad Horjulom in 1953.

== Church ==
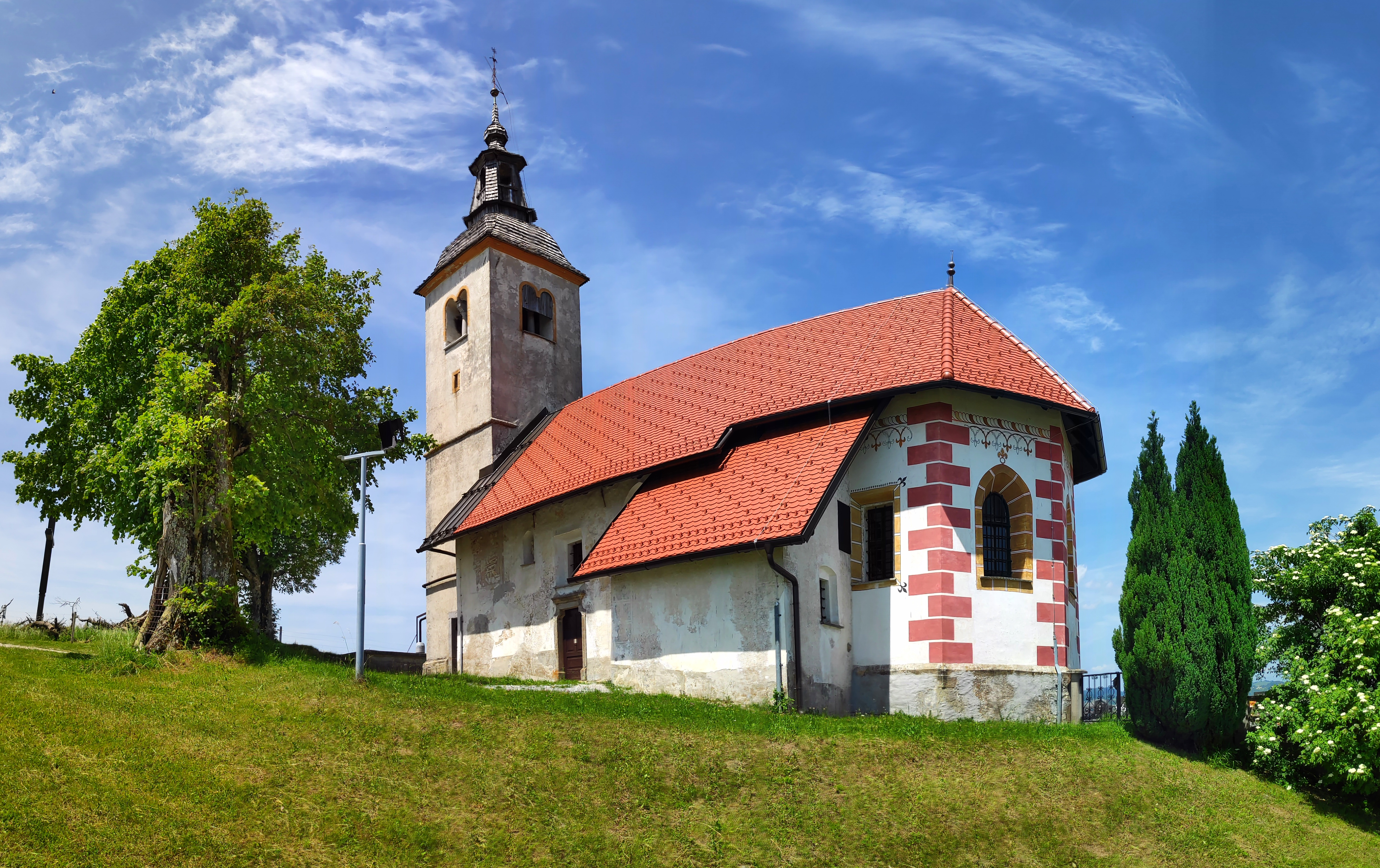
Sts. Hermagoras and Fortunatus Church

The local church in the settlement is dedicated to Saints Hermagoras and Fortunatus and belongs to the Parish of Horjul.
