= Dobrova, Dobrova–Polhov Gradec =

Dobrova
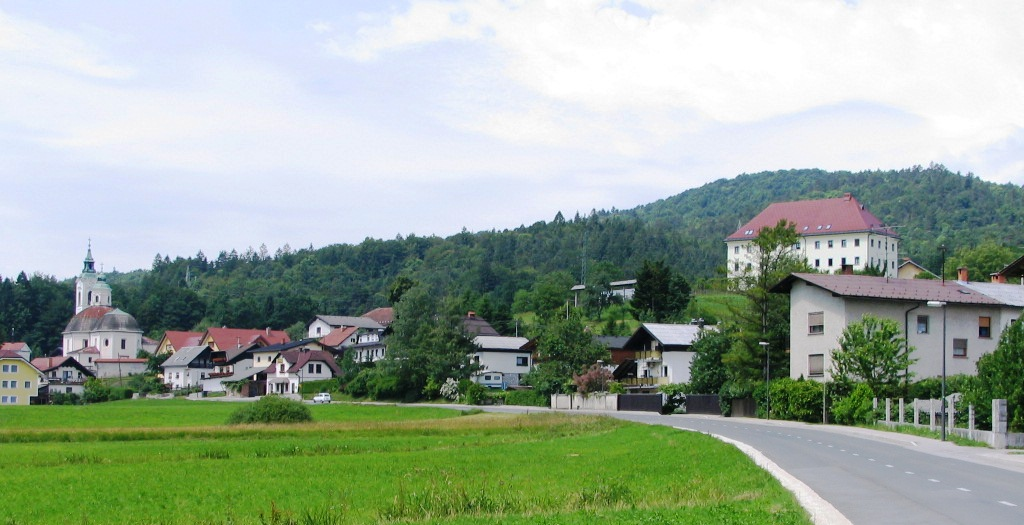
- Dobrova with the parish church (left), the rectory and convent (top right), and Dobrova Hill in the background

- Location in Slovenia
- Coordinates: 46°3′11.89″N 14°24′52.01″E
- Country: Slovenia
- Traditional region: Upper Carniola
- Statistical region: Central Slovenia
- Municipality: Dobrova–Polhov Gradec

Area
  - Total: 7.93 km^{2} (3.06 sq mi)
- Elevation: 310.3 m (1,018 ft)

Population (2020)
  - Total: 921
  - Density: 116/km^{2} (301/sq mi)

Dobrova (pronounced [ˈdoːbɾɔʋa]; German: Dobrawa) is a clustered settlement northwest of Ljubljana in the Upper Carniola region of Slovenia. It is the administrative centre of the Municipality of Dobrova–Polhov Gradec. It lies on the road from Ljubljana to Polhov Gradec at the point where roads split off to Horjul to the southwest and to Šentvid, Ljubljana to the northeast. It extends along the flat area to the northeast up to the Gradaščica River and encompasses much of Dobrova Hill (Slovene: Dobrovski hrib, 603 m; also known as Vrhe Hill or Jazbina Hill) to the southwest. Bezenica Creek, Broad Creek (Slovene: Široki potok), and Ječnik Creek, left tributaries of the Horjulščica River, flow through the hills west of the settlement. Dobrova includes the hamlets of Pod Kotom (Pod kotom) northwest of the main settlement and Graben southwest of the main settlement.

== Name ==
Dobrova was first mentioned in German written sources in 1252 as in Harde (literally, 'in the woods'), in 1354 as cze Hard ('at the woods'), and in 1490 as bey der Hurd ('by the woods'), semantically corresponding to the Slovene name. The name Dobrova is derived from Common Slavic *dǫbrova 'place where there is a deciduous or oak forest', in turn derived from *dǫbъ 'deciduous tree, oak'. Like similar names (e.g., Dobrovce, Dobrovnik, Zadobrova), it originally referred to the local vegetation. In the past it was known as Dobrawa in German.

== History ==
The name of nearby Gradišče Hill (cf. grad 'castle') south of Dobrova, across the Horjulščica River, hints at late Roman or even earlier settlement of the area. A school was founded in Dobrova in 1844 in the sexton's house, which was later adapted for school needs.

=== Second World War ===
On 8 July 1942, the Partisans attacked an Italian stronghold at the rectory in Dobrova. On the following day the village was burned. On 20 November 1942, the Partisans abducted and killed seven people from the nearby village of Zaklanec in the Broad Creek Gorge. On 27 January 1943, the Partisans burned down the newly built six-year school in Dobrova.

== Church ==
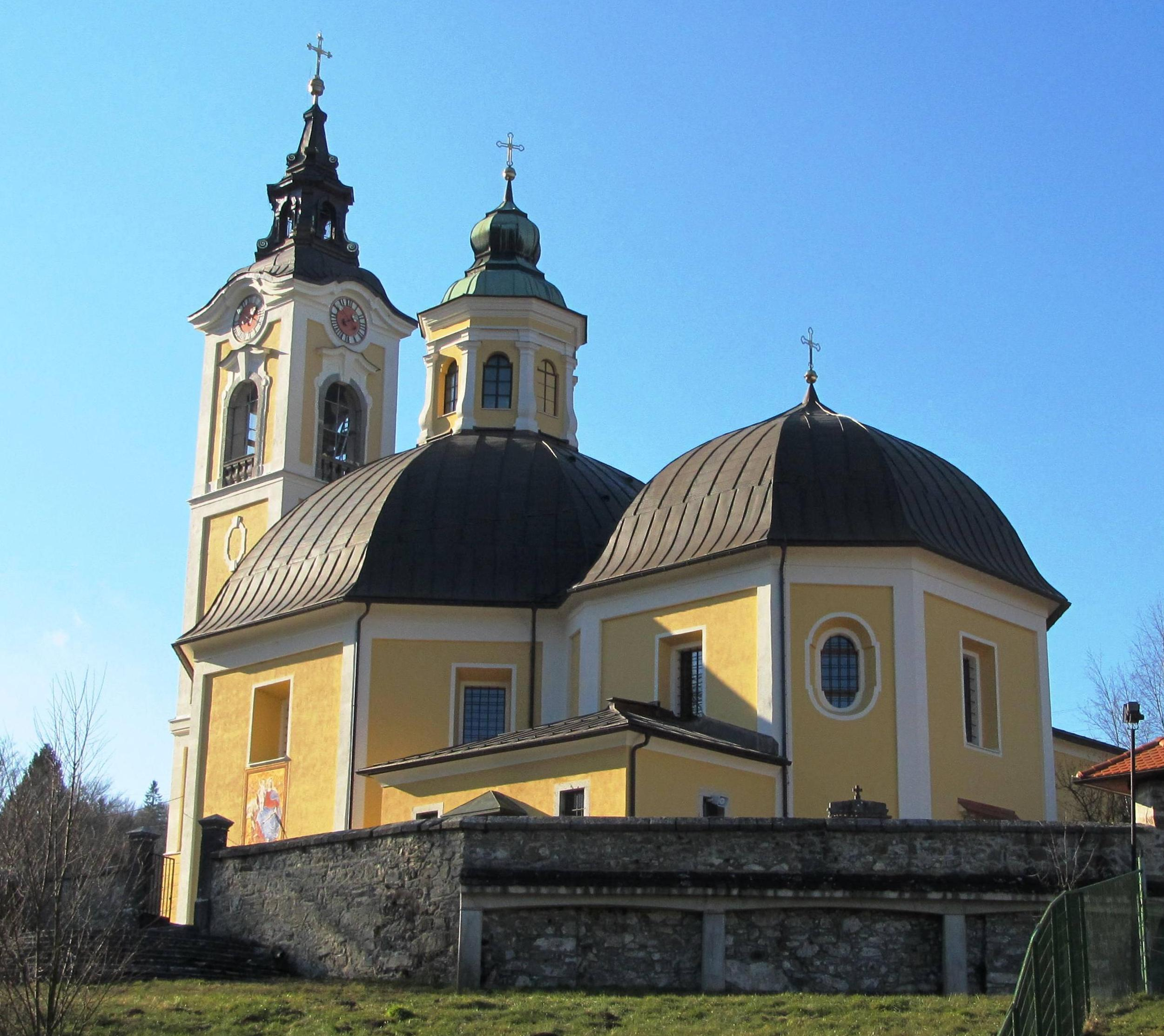
Assumption Church in Dobrova

The parish church in Dobrova is dedicated to the Assumption of Mary and was one of the most important pilgrimage churches in Carniola. A church or chapel has stood at this site since before 1231, when the structure there was enlarged. According to Johann Weikhard von Valvasor, this is one of the oldest church sites in Slovenia, and according to some sources the pilgrimage to a shrine there may date back to as early as 970.

Dobrova was originally subordinate to the proto-parish of Šentvid nad Ljubljano. Because of Dobrova's distance from Šentvid and to better serve the increasingly large number of pilgrims that traveled to Dobrova, a vicariate was established in Dobrova in 1723, and it was made an independent parish in 1784. The vicariate already included the churches in Gabrje, Hruševo, and Brezje pri Dobrovi as chapels of ease, and Podsmreka was added to the new parish in 1784.

The current church was built between 1711 and 1716, largely due to the efforts of Baron Franc Bogomir Polhograjski, at that time the cathedral canon and dean in Ljubljana. The church was designed by the architect Gregor Maček Sr. (1664–1725). The height of the bell tower was increased in 1752. The interior frescos were painted by Matija Bradaška (1852–1915) and the main altar is a work by Matija Tomc (1814–1885). The church was formerly known as the Our Lady of the Hazels Church (cerkev Marije v leščevju) due to the hazels that still grow there. The church has been protected as a cultural heritage monument since 2009.

== Notable people ==
Notable people that were born in, lived in, or had family connections to Dobrova include:

- Emil Adamič (1877–1936), composer
- Jože Marinko (1893–1975), poet
- Joe Sutter (1921–2016), the "father of the Boeing 747," son of Franz Suhadolz (1879–1945), an emigrant from Dobrova

== Gallery ==
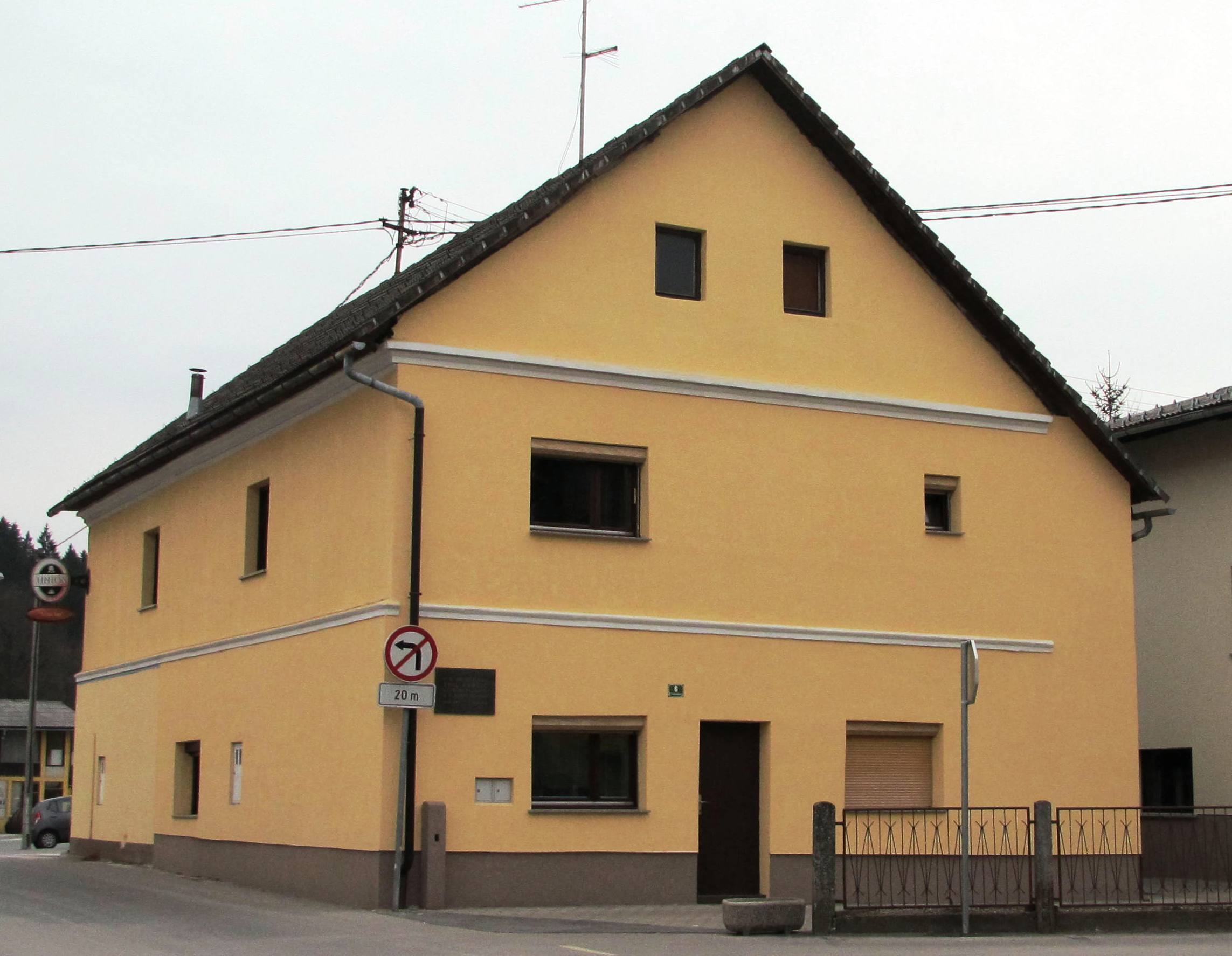
House in Dobrova where the composer Emil Adamič was born

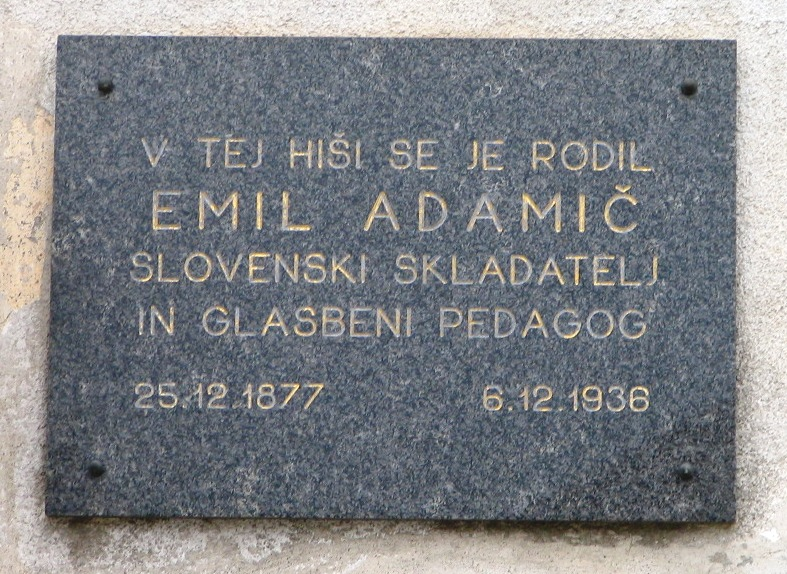
Plaque: "The Slovenian composer and music teacher Emil Adamič was born in this house (25 Dec. 1877 – 6 Dec. 1936)"

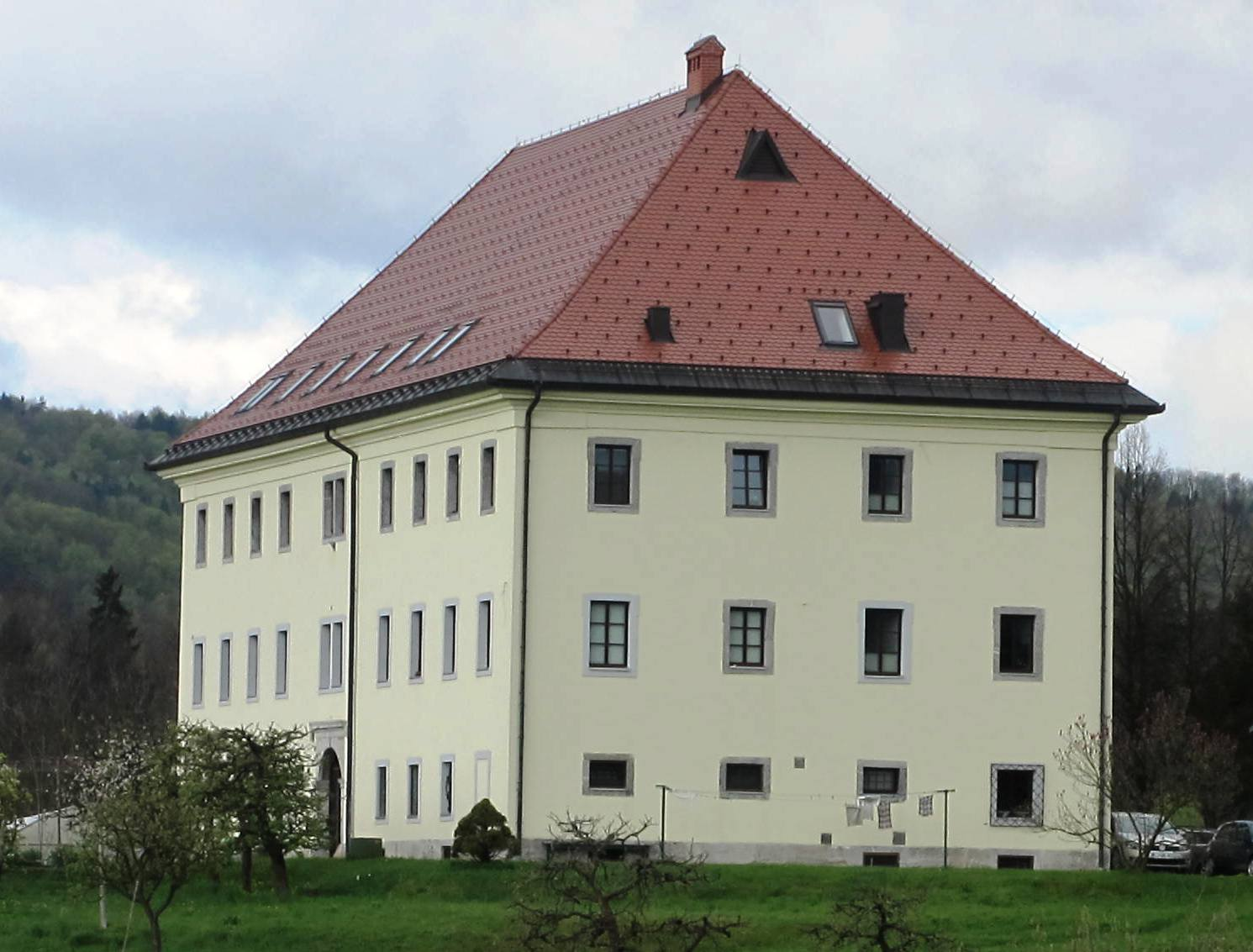
Rectory and convent in Dobrova

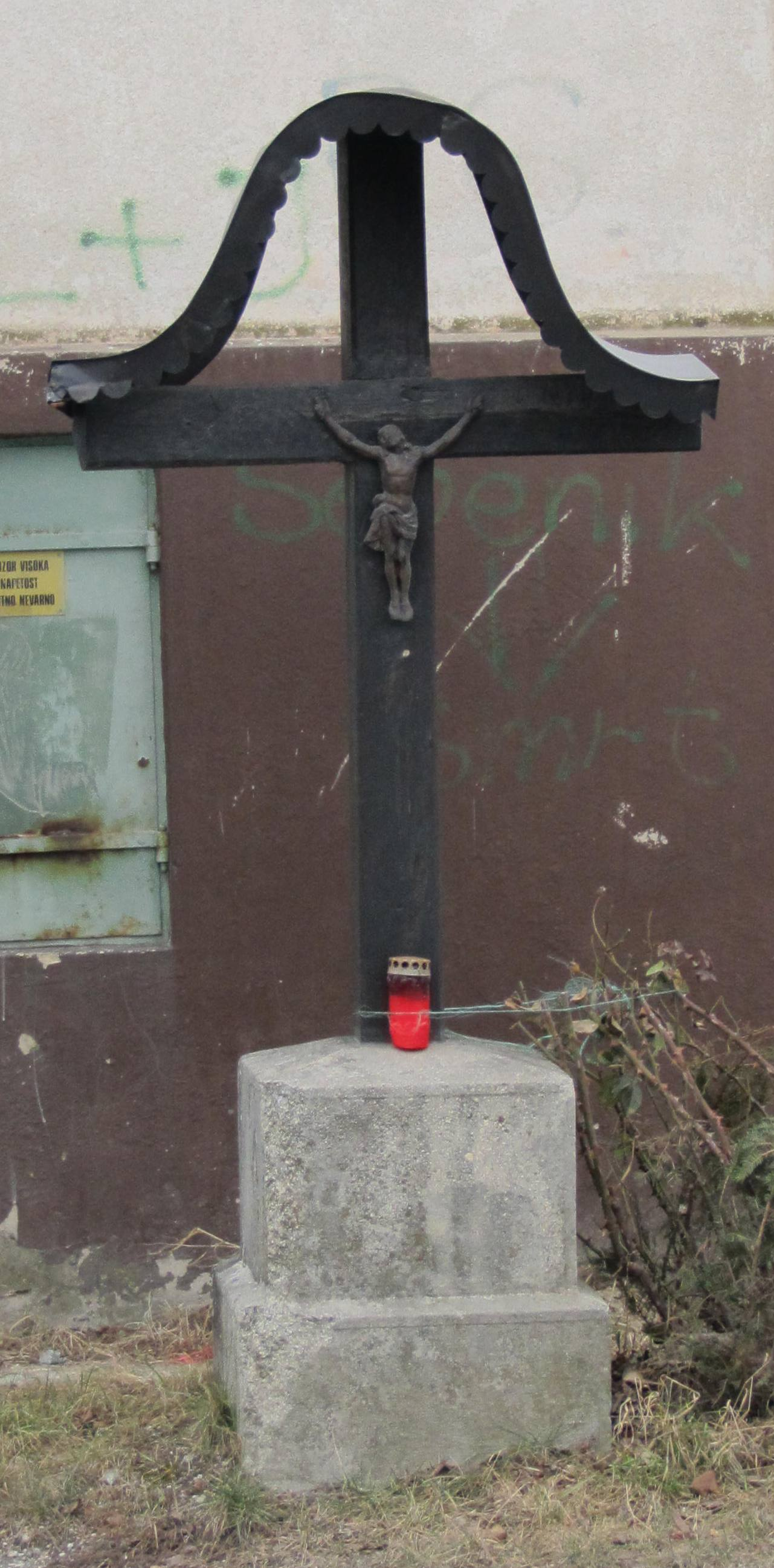
Wayside shrine at the intersection of the roads to Polhov Gradec and Stranska Vas
