= Samotorica =

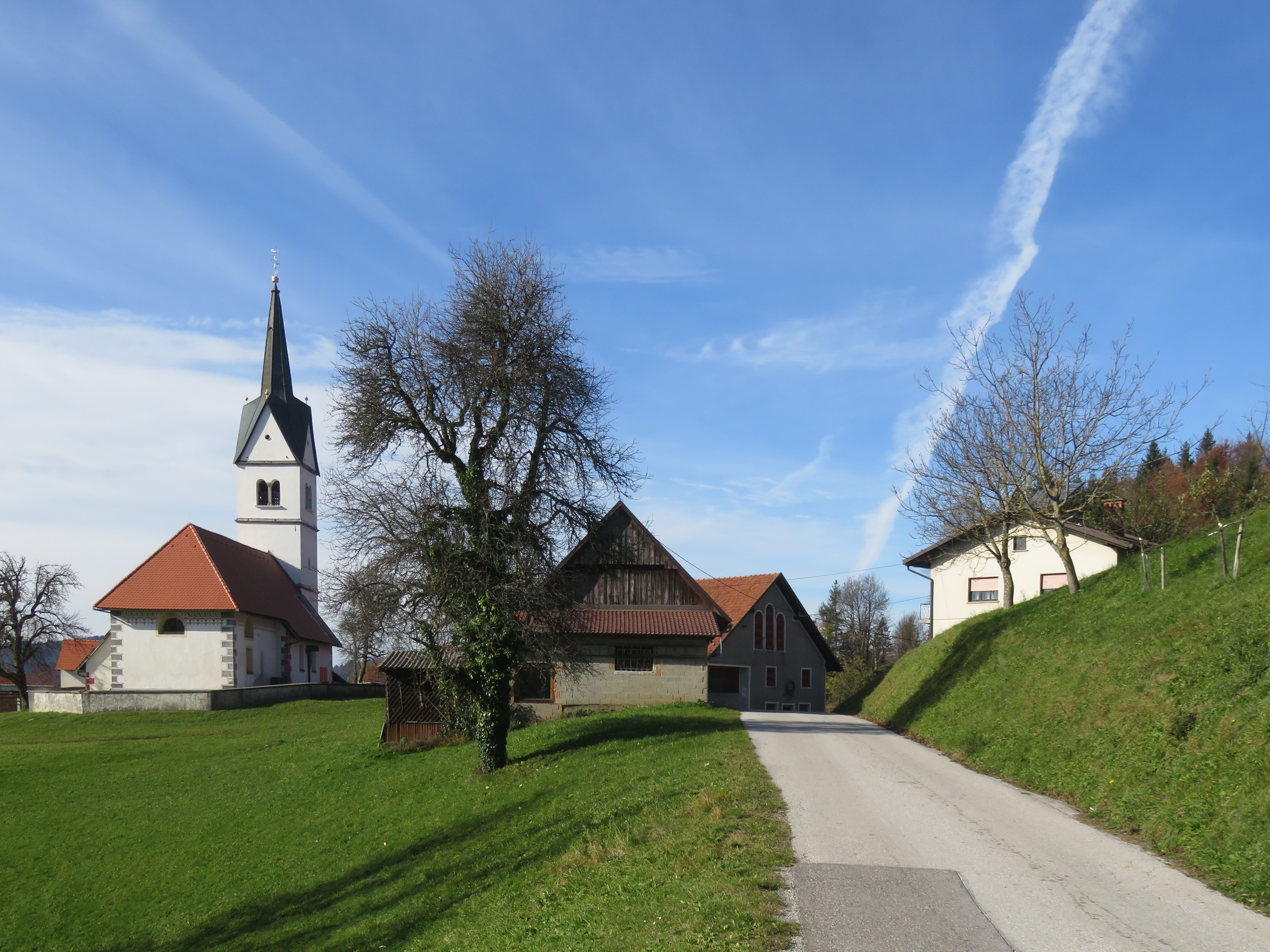

- Location in Slovenia
- Coordinates: 46°1′47.12″N 14°14′58.12″E
- Country: Slovenia
- Traditional region: Inner Carniola
- Statistical region: Central Slovenia
- Municipality: Horjul

Area
  - Total: 5.19 km^{2} (2.00 sq mi)
- Elevation: 645.4 m (2,117 ft)

Population (2002)
  - Total: 69

Samotorica (pronounced [samɔˈtoːɾitsa]) is a dispersed settlement in the hills northwest of Horjul in the Inner Carniola region of Slovenia.

== Name ==
Samotorica was first mentioned in written records in 1340 as Zamatůrnicz (and in 1489 as Samotoritz and Samatoritz). The name may be derived from the Slavic common noun *samotvorъ 'natural feature', referring to some striking landscape element, or perhaps from the hypothetical personal name *Samotvor.

== Church ==
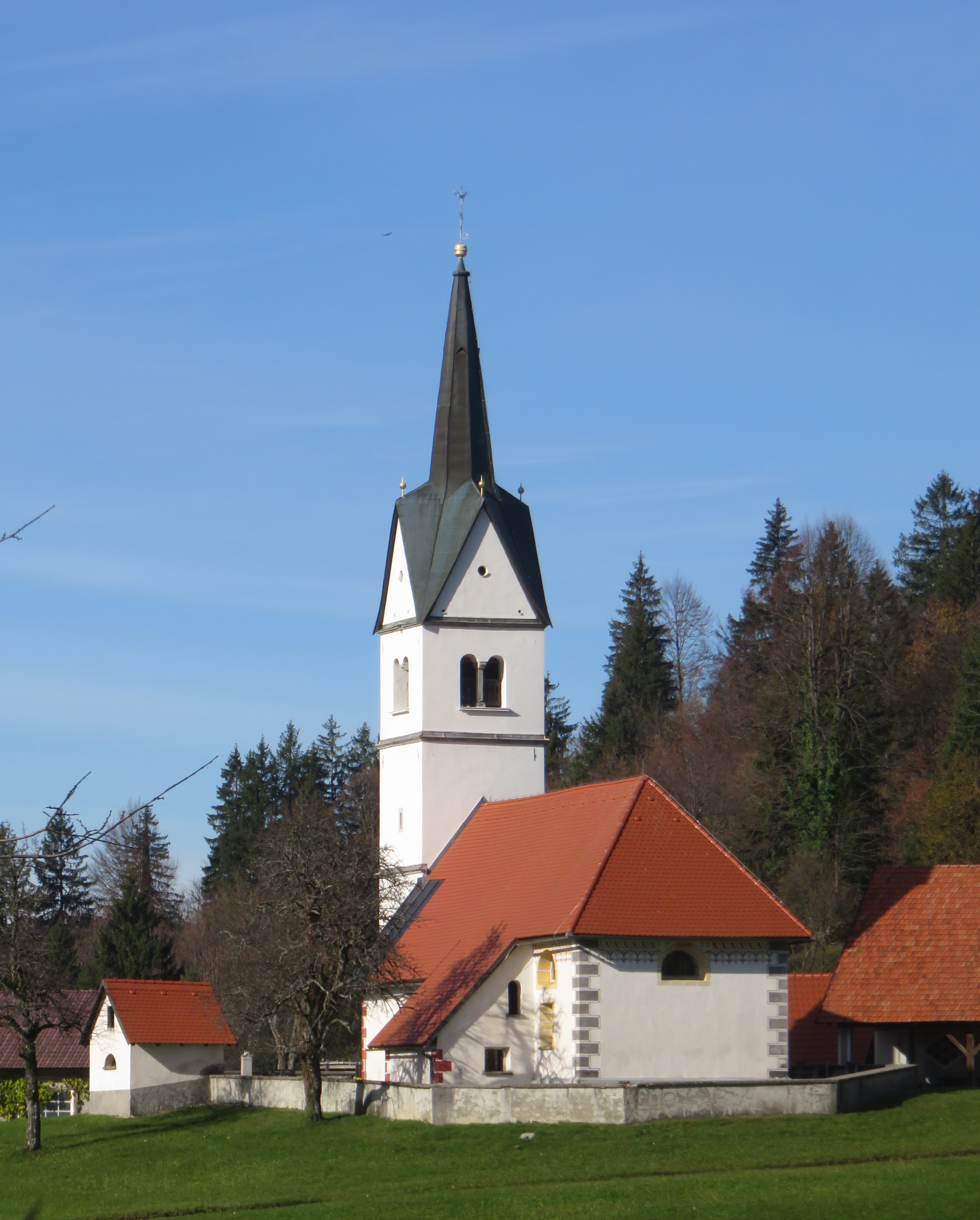
Archangel Michael Church

The local church in the settlement is dedicated to Archangel Michael and belongs to the Parish of Horjul. It contains early 16th-century frescos and a painted wooden ceiling.
