= Lesno Brdo, Horjul =

Lesno Brdo
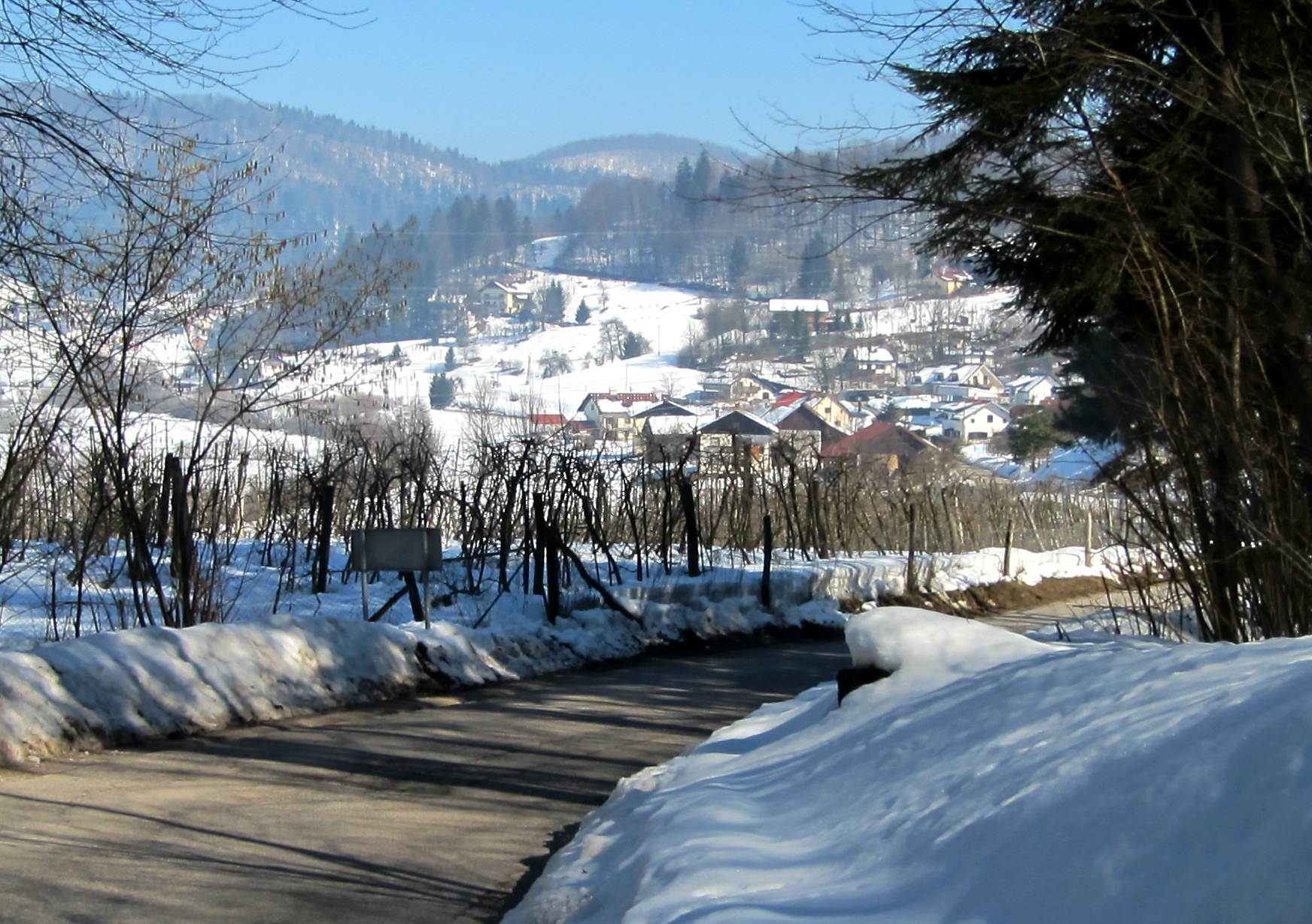

- Location in Slovenia
- Coordinates: 46°0′56.26″N 14°19′16.37″E
- Country: Slovenia
- Traditional region: Inner Carniola
- Statistical region: Central Slovenia
- Municipality: Horjul

Area
  - Total: 1.76 km^{2} (0.68 sq mi)
- Elevation: 335.5 m (1,101 ft)

Population (2002)
  - Total: 106

Lesno Brdo (pronounced [ˈleːsnɔ ˈbəɾdɔ]; German: Hölzenegg) is a settlement in the Municipality of Horjul in the Inner Carniola region of Slovenia. A small part of the settlement is in the neighbouring Municipality of Vrhnika.

== Church ==
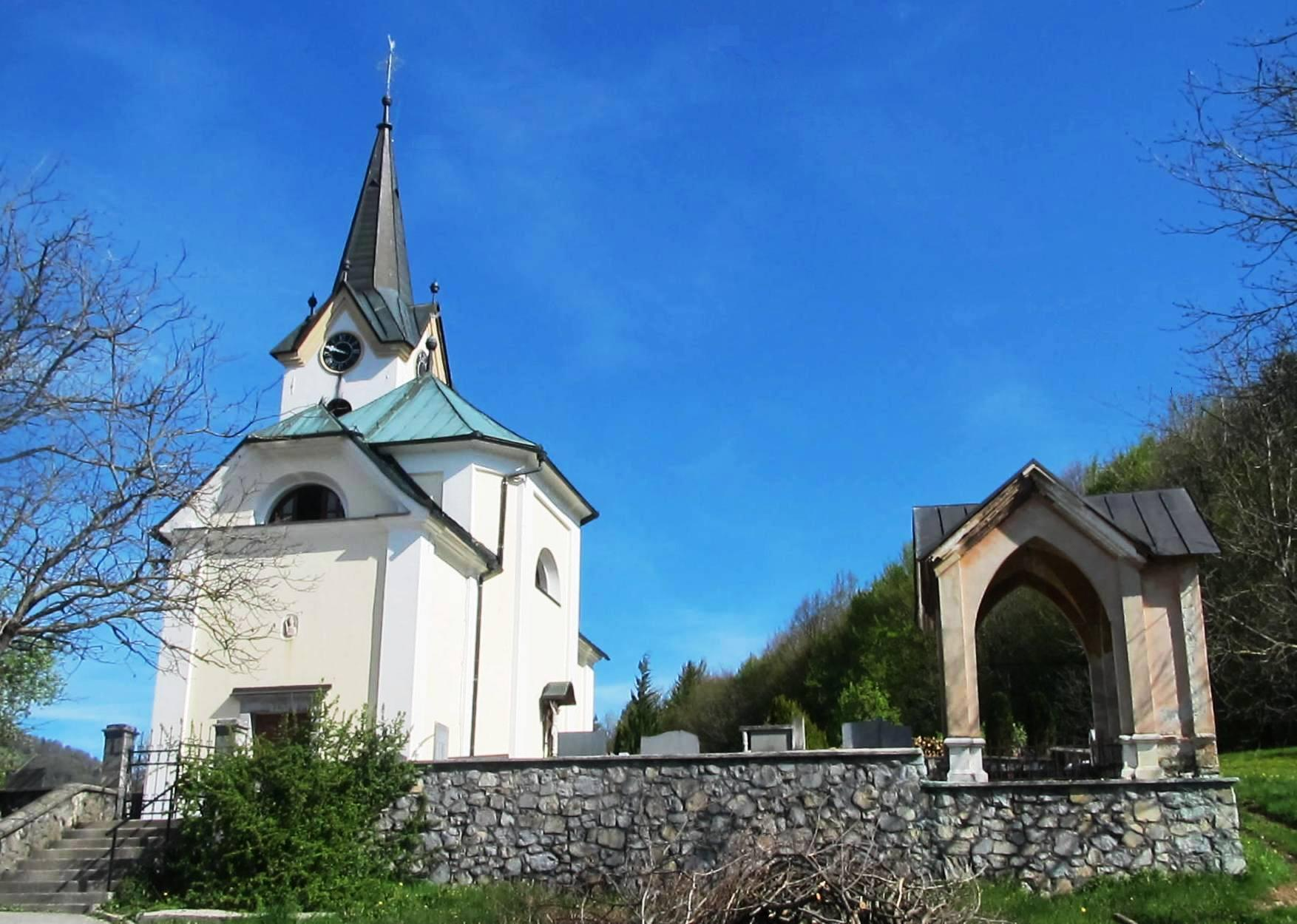
Assumption Church

The local church is built in the Horjul side of the settlement and is dedicated to the Assumption of Mary. It belongs to the Parish of Vrhnika and stands below Ferjan Hill (Slovene: Ferjanov grič). It was first mentioned in written sources in 1526. The keystone over the entryway bears the year 1542 and the interior furnishings date from the 18th century.

== Cultural heritage ==
In addition to the Church of the Assumption, several other structures in Lesno Brdo have protected cultural monument status:

- Ferjan Hill is classified as a potential archaeological site with a prehistoric settlement. The same archaeological site encompasses the former 17th-century Lesno Brdo mansion (dvorec Lesno brdo), which used to stand next to the church. A new house was built over its foundations after the Second World War.
- Baumkircher Tower (Baumkircherjev turn, German: Baumkircherthurn) was a 14th-century castle. It was destroyed by order of Frederick III when he had the owner, Andreas Baumkircher, executed as a conspirator in 1471. The defensive moat of the castle is still visible.
- A concrete stele serves as a monument to the Kucler family. It contains part of the door casing of the Kucler farmhouse, burned in 1942. The parents and five of their sons were killed during the Second World War. A metal plaque was added to the monument in 1982. It stands in an orchard next to the house at Lesno Brdo no. 61. Antonija Celar Kucler (1896–1942) was proclaimed a People's Hero of Yugoslavia on 21 July 1953 for her role in running a Partisan checkpoint and storehouse at her home.
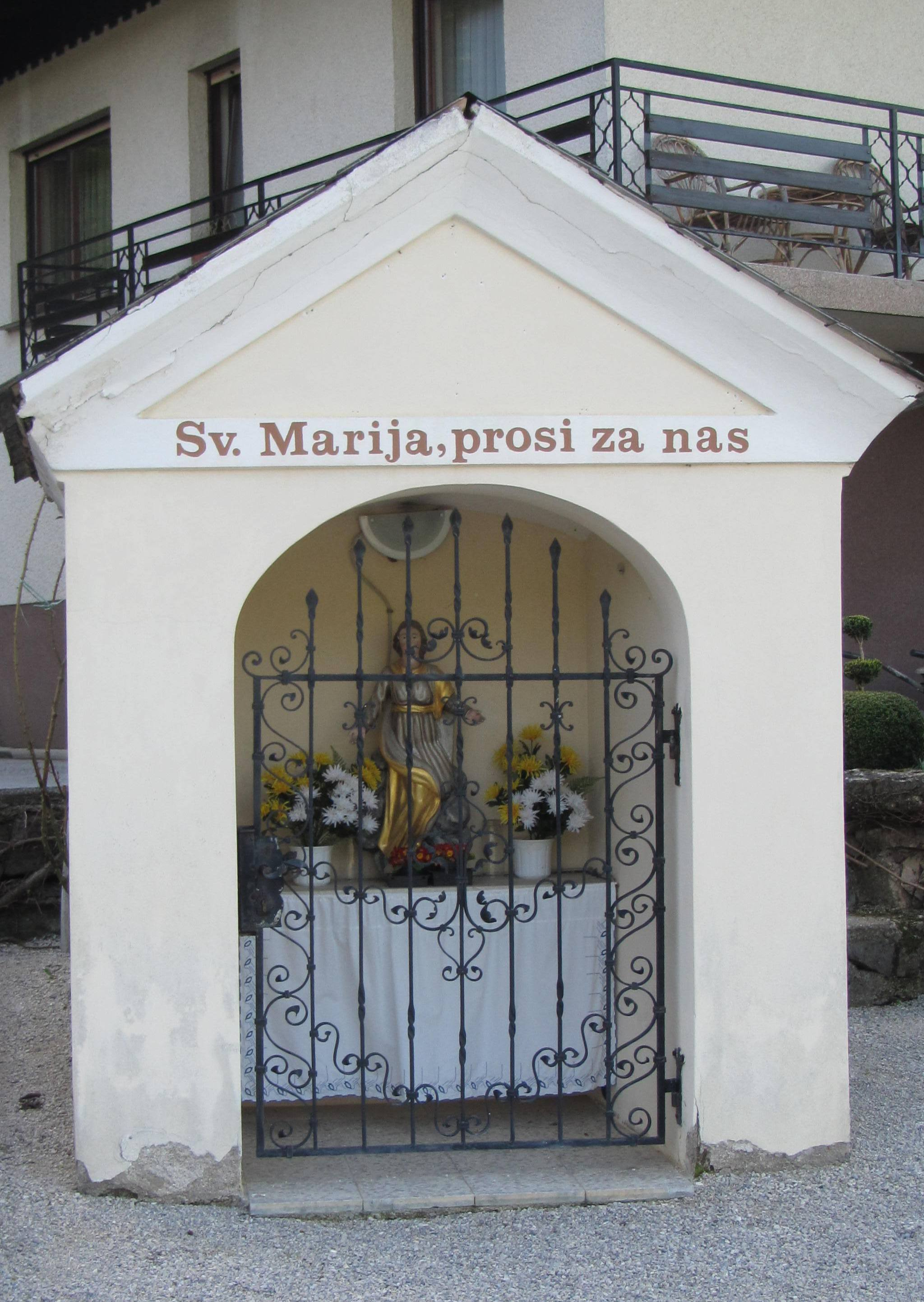
Chapel-shrine below Ferjan Hill
