= Emil Adamič =

Slovenian composer

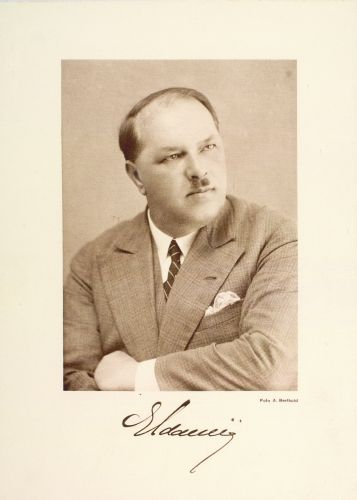
Emil Adamič

Emil Adamič (December 25, 1877 – December 6, 1936) was among the most productive Slovenian composers. He wrote choral and orchestral music, altogether over 1,000 works.

Adamič was born in Dobrova to August Adamič (1843–1915) and Katharina Brus Adamič (1854–1915). He studied at conservatories in Trieste and Ljubljana. During the First World War, he was a prisoner of war in Tashkent. His works include the orchestral pieces Tatarska suita (Tatar Suite, 1918) and Ljubljanski akvareli (Ljubljana Watercolours, 1925) and the choral compositions Vragova nevesta (The Devil's Bride, 1925) and Smrt carja Samuela (The Death of Tsar Samuel, 1934). He also wrote songs that used elements of Slovenian folk music, such as Zimska kmečka pesem (A Farmer's Winter Song, 1903). His influences included Romanticism, Impressionism, and Expressionism. He died in Ljubljana.

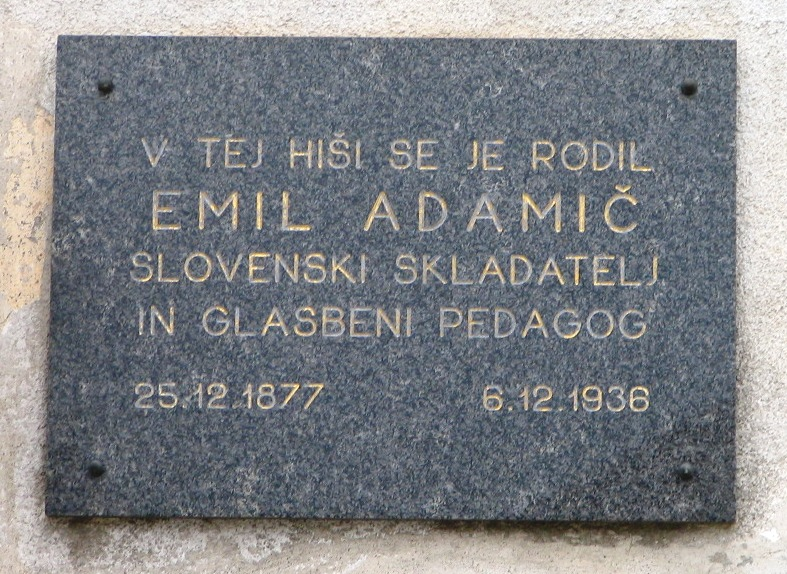
Plaque in Dobrova: "The Slovenian composer and music teacher Emil Adamič was born in this house (Dec. 25, 1877 – Dec. 6, 1936)"
