= Municipality of Horjul =

Municipality of Slovenia

Municipality of Horjul Občina Horjul
- Municipality
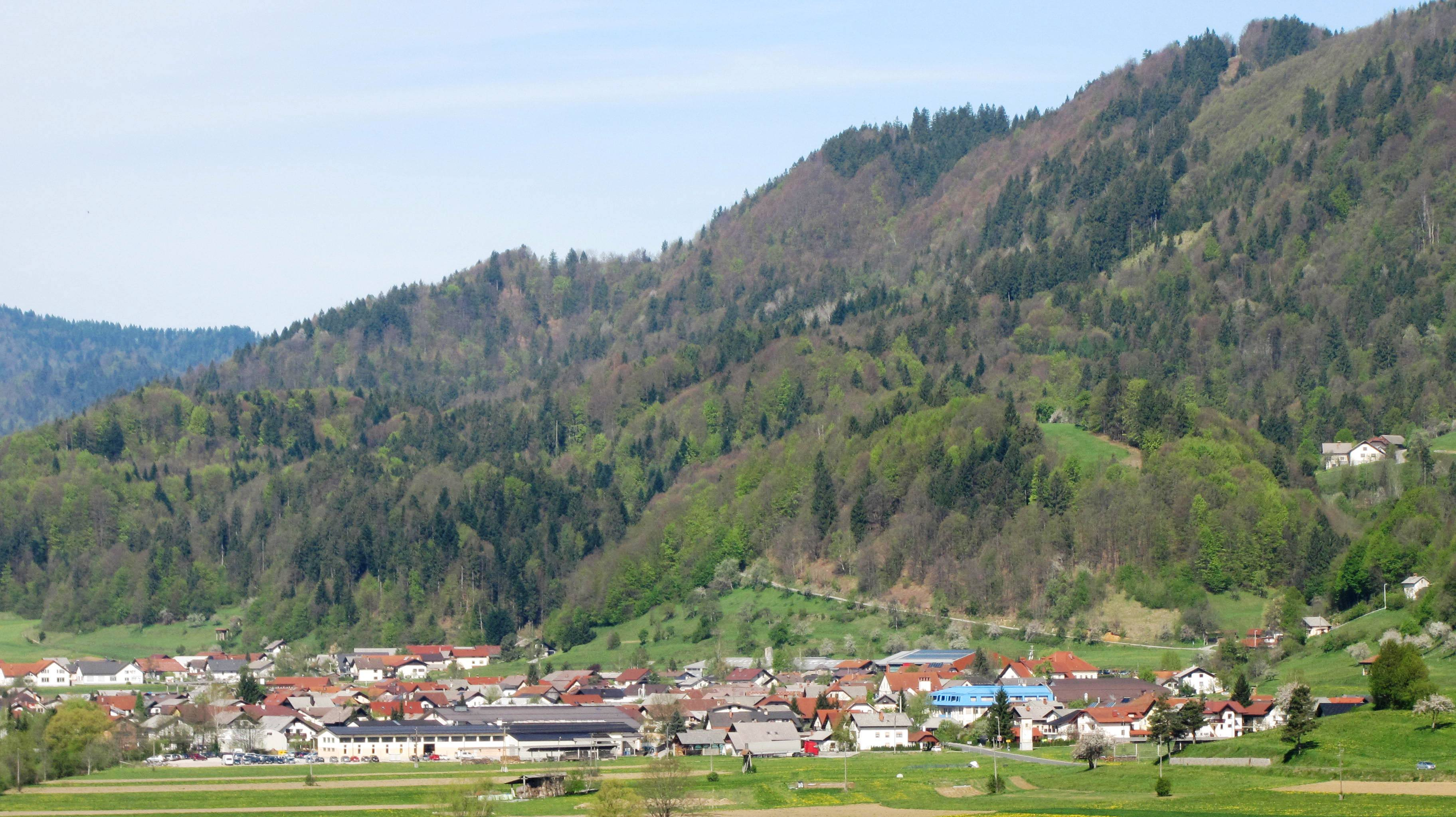
- The town of Horjul

- Location of the Municipality of Horjul in Slovenia
- Coordinates: 46°01′19″N 14°17′46″E
- Country: Slovenia

Government
  - Mayor: Janko Prebil (N.Si)

Area
  - Total: 32.5 km^{2} (12.5 sq mi)

Population (2002)
  - Total: 2,622
  - Density: 80.7/km^{2} (209/sq mi)
- Time zone: UTC+01 (CET)
  - Summer (DST): UTC+02 (CEST)
- Website: www.horjul.si

The Municipality of Horjul (pronounced [xɔˈɾjuːl]; Slovene: Občina Horjul) is a municipality in the Inner Carniola region of Slovenia. Its administrative center is the town of Horjul.

== Settlements ==
In addition to the municipal seat of Horjul, the municipality also includes the following settlements:

- Koreno nad Horjulom
- Lesno Brdo
- Ljubgojna
- Podolnica
- Samotorica
- Vrzdenec
- Zaklanec
- Žažar
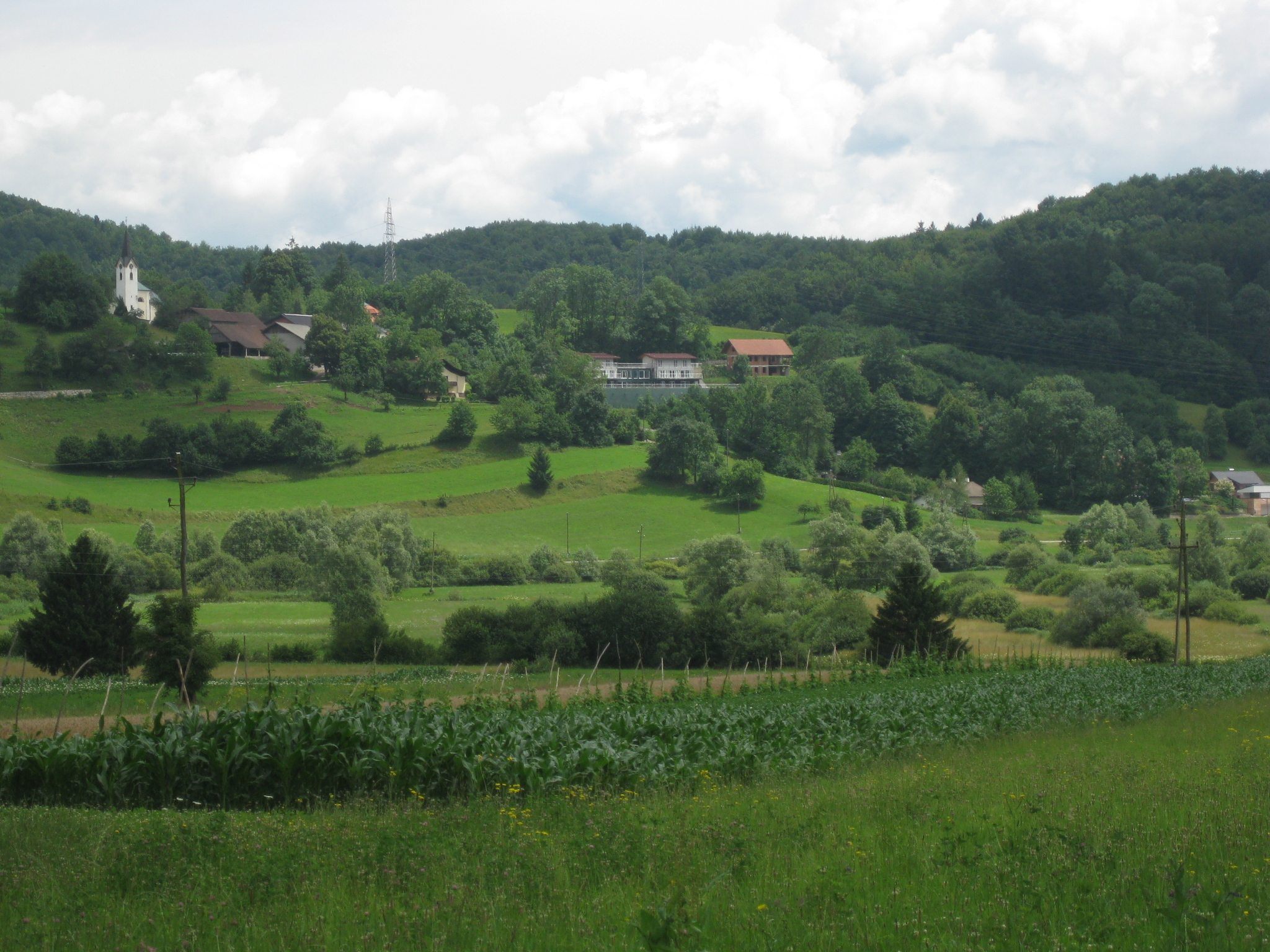
Landscape in Lesno Brdo
