= Podolnica =

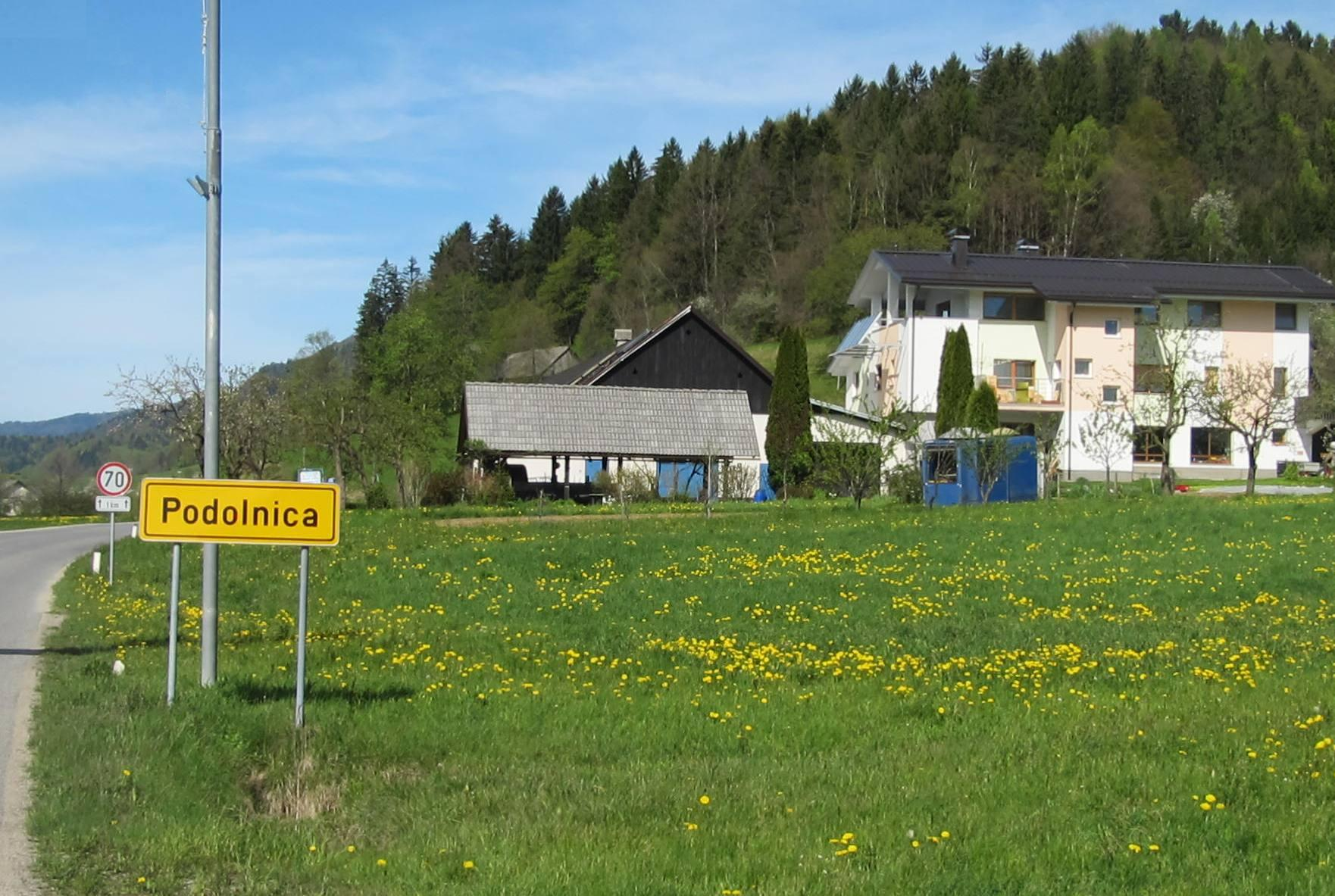

- Location in Slovenia
- Coordinates: 46°1′35.91″N 14°19′39.14″E
- Country: Slovenia
- Traditional region: Inner Carniola
- Statistical region: Central Slovenia
- Municipality: Horjul

Area
  - Total: 2.23 km^{2} (0.86 sq mi)
- Elevation: 353.2 m (1,159 ft)

Population (2002)
  - Total: 201

Podolnica (pronounced [pɔˈdoːu̯nitsa]) is a village east of Horjul in the Inner Carniola region of Slovenia.

== Church ==
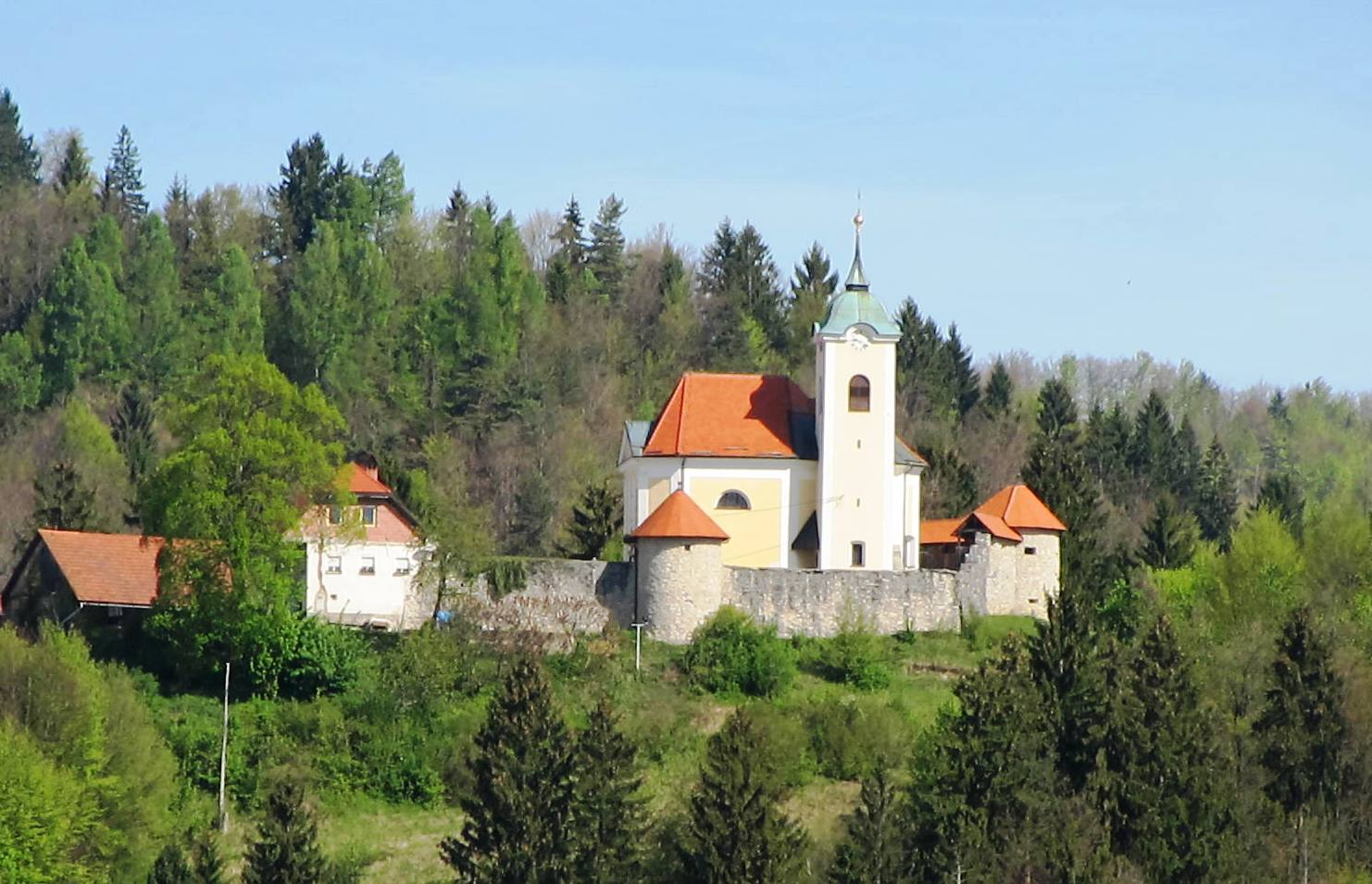
St. Ulrich's Church

The local church is built on a small hill west of the settlement and is dedicated to Saint Ulrich (Slovene: sveti Urh) and belongs to the Parish of Horjul. It originally had a defence wall around it to protect local people from Ottoman raids in the 15th century. The original church burnt down in the early 18th century and the current building was erected in 1751, using the stone from the redundant defence walls.
