= Žažar =

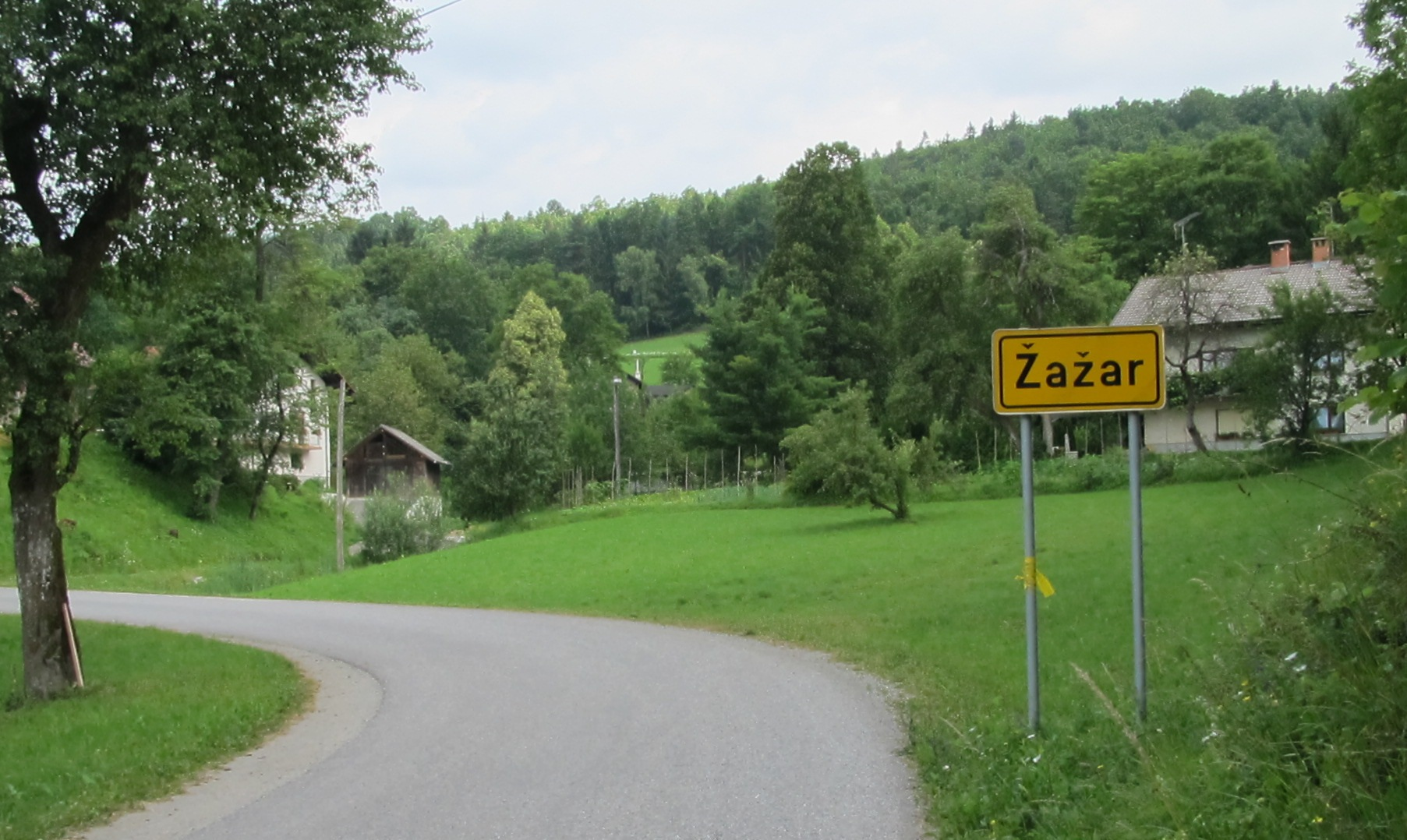

- Location in Slovenia
- Coordinates: 46°0′30.19″N 14°15′22.4″E
- Country: Slovenia
- Traditional region: Inner Carniola
- Statistical region: Central Slovenia
- Municipality: Horjul

Area
  - Total: 4.9 km^{2} (1.9 sq mi)
- Elevation: 445.2 m (1,461 ft)

Population (2002)
  - Total: 169

Žažar (pronounced [ˈʒaːʒaɾ]; German: Saschar or Schaschar) is a village in the hills southwest of Horjul in the Inner Carniola region of Slovenia. It includes the hamlet of Razpotje.

== Geography ==
Southwest of the settlement core is the Jevše Valley with a watering hole for livestock. The Trešnica Gorge and Gošava Spring lie northeast of the settlement core. The territory of the settlement includes the following hills: Koprivnik Hill (elevation: 551 meters or 1,808 feet), Babca Peak (Slovene: Babčin vrh, elevation: 503 meters or 1,650 feet), Gradišče Hill (elevation: 547 meters or 1,795 feet), and Žažar Hill (elevation: 447 meters or 1,467 feet). There is an opening into Pajsar Cave (Pajsarjeva jama), which is 130 meters (430 ft) long and lies in the southern part of the settlement.

== Name ==
Žažar is also known locally as Žajžar. The priest and historian Peter Hicinger explained the name as meaning žarišče 'focal point of a fire', from the verb žariti 'to heat (red hot)'. In the past it was known as Saschar or Schaschar in German.

== History ==
There is a walled prehistoric burial ground on Gradišče Hill. A school was established in Žažar in 1913. A school building was built in 1927.

=== Second World War ===
The village was partially burned by Italian troops on June 9, 1942. At the end of January 1943 the Partisans attacked an Italian stronghold at the elementary school in Žažar.

=== Mass graves ===
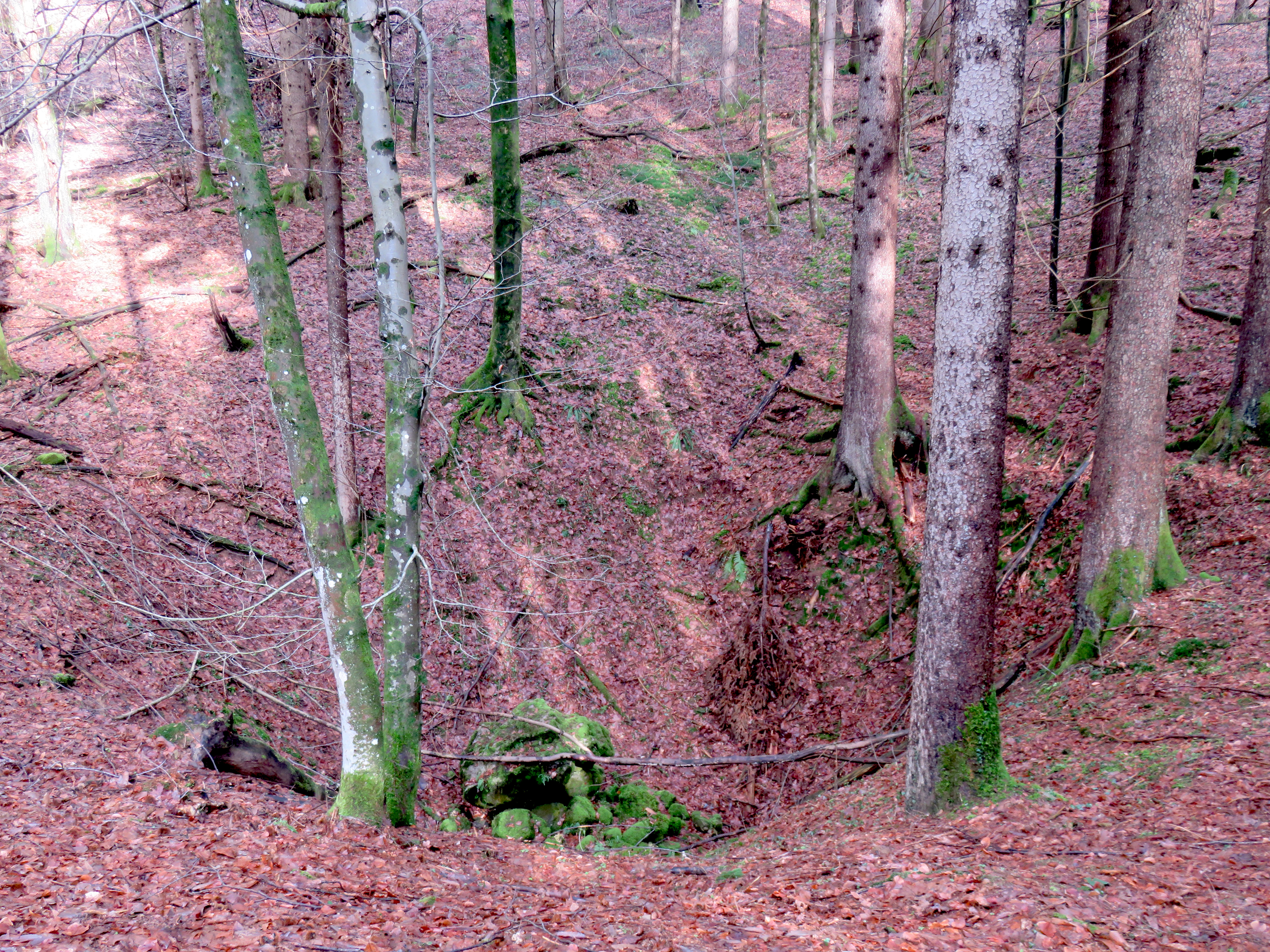
Rupe Mass Grave

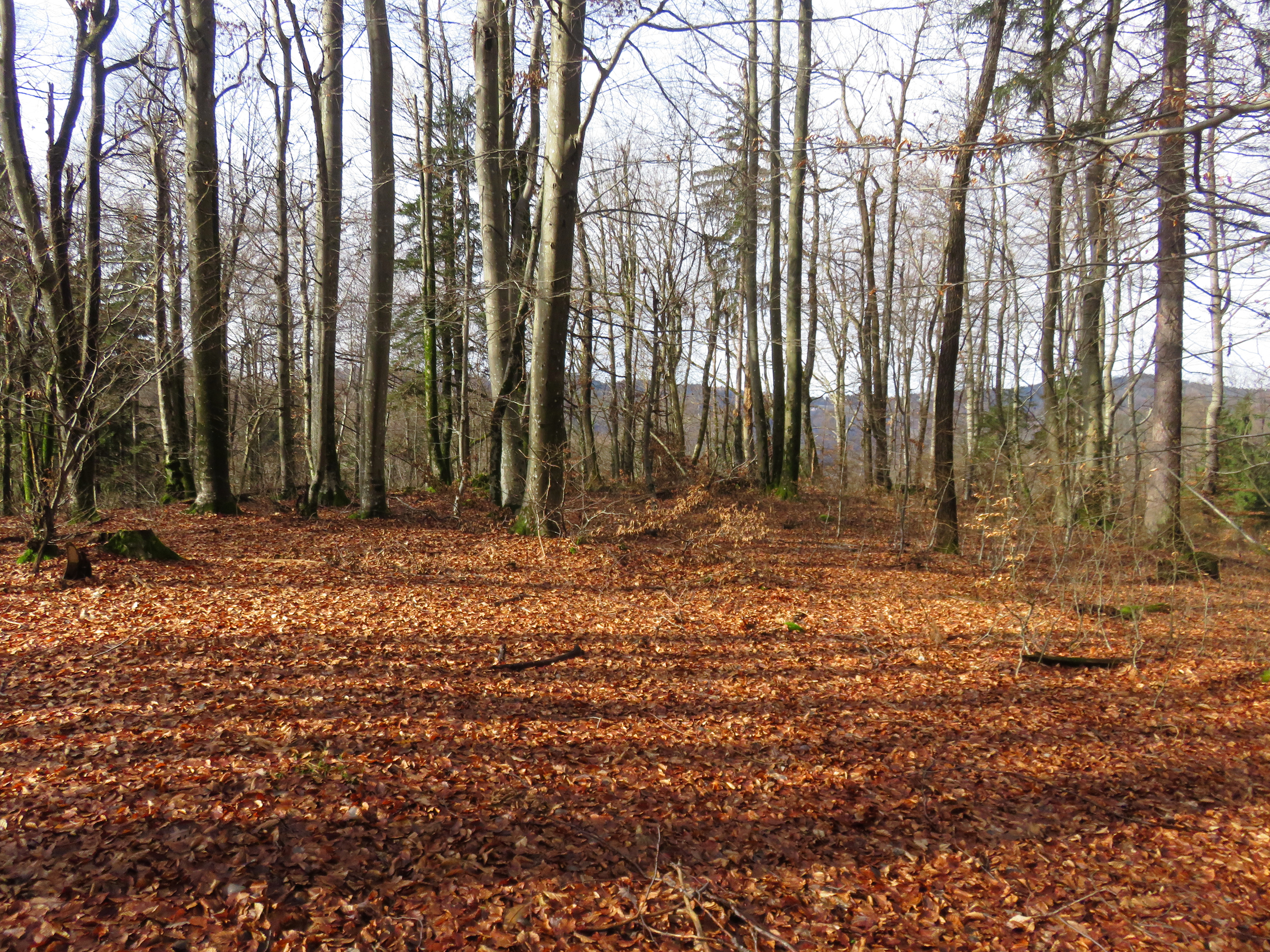
Koprivnik Mass Grave

On 2 August 1942, nine civilians from Šentjošt nad Horjulom and other nearby villages were taken to the forest west of Žažar by the Partisans and murdered. Their bodies were thrown into a sinkhole known as the Rupe Mass Grave (Slovene: Grobišče v Rupah) on the slope of Križman Peak (Križmanov vrh) near the hamlet of Kajndol in neighboring Smrečje. Another mass grave from the Second World War is located nearby, known as the Koprivnik Mass Grave (Grobišče Koprivnik). It contains the remains of Slovene civilians.

== Church ==
The local church in the settlement is dedicated to Saint Anne and belongs to the Parish of Podlipa. It was first mentioned in written sources in 1526. It is a Gothic structure with ribbed vaulting. The main altar, dating from 1907, is the work of the sculptor Ivan (a.k.a. Janez) Buh from Vrhnika, and the side altars date from 1836 and 1858. The church stands in the southeast part of the settlement, north of the road. It has protected cultural heritage status.

== Cultural heritage ==
In addition to Saint Anne's Church, several other structures in Žažar have protected cultural monument status:

- The Gradišče–Ruperčev Svet archaeological site consists of a fortification with well-preserved defensive walls. Nearby is a tumulus and a flat Iron Age and Roman-era burial ground.
- The Konfin archaeological site is located on Konfin Saddle. Iron ore slag has been discovered here. A large smelter stood here, probably associated with the ancient fort on Gradišče Hill, believed to have been active during the Roman era.
- The farm at Žažar no. 1 has a rectangular stone house with the year 1882 carved into the stone door casing. It is covered with a symmetrical gabled roof. The farm also has a barn of the same age with decorative brick ventilation holes. The farm is located at the northwest edge of the village.
- The stone barn at Žažar no. 13 dates from the last quarter of the 19th century. It has stalls below and a hayloft above. The gables have brick double-lancet ventilation holes, and on the sides there is wooden latticework for ventilation. The building has a symmetrical gabled roof. The farm is in the southeastern part of the settlement.
- The barn at Žažar no. 16 is a rectangular two-story building. The semicircular door casing into the stall bears the year 1881. The upper lever has ventilation holes, and in the gable there are two windows with louvers and two rosettes. The building has a half-hip roof. The farm is in the southern part of the settlement.
- The farmhouse at Žažar no. 27 is a single-story rectangular building that was built in 1843 and adapted in 1879. It has a smoke kitchen, small windows, and old architectural elements. It has a symmetrical gabled roof and a wooden gable with a balcony. The farm is in the northeast part of Žažar.
- There is an open chapel-shrine dedicated to Our Lady of Peace outside the settlement, north of the house at Žažar no. 24. It was erected in 1923 in memory of those that fell during the First World War and it contains a statue of the Virgin Mary.
- At the crossroads in the center of the village there is a three-story Baroque chapel-shrine with doors. It has shallow, semicircular niches and 19th-century paintings of Saint Anne, Saint Florian, the Virgin Mary, and Saint Elizabeth.
- A single straight-line hayrack with three sections and stone columns stands in the village. It was erected in 1906 and has a symmetrical gabled roof covered with concrete tiles. It stands along a route leading out of Žažar to the south and is part of the farm at Žažar no. 16.
- The roofed double hayrack with three sections at Žažar no. 14 was built by Andrej Kogovšek; the year 1856 is carved into the second transverse beam. The sections of the hayrack are closed by perpendicular intersecting beams and it has a steep symmetrical gabled roof. It stands in the southern part of the settlement.
- In the woods on the east slope of Križman Peak there is a small concrete memorial in the shape of a square frustum. It bears an upright metal plaque commemorating the second battalion of the Dolomite Detachment, which camped at this site in the fall of 1942.
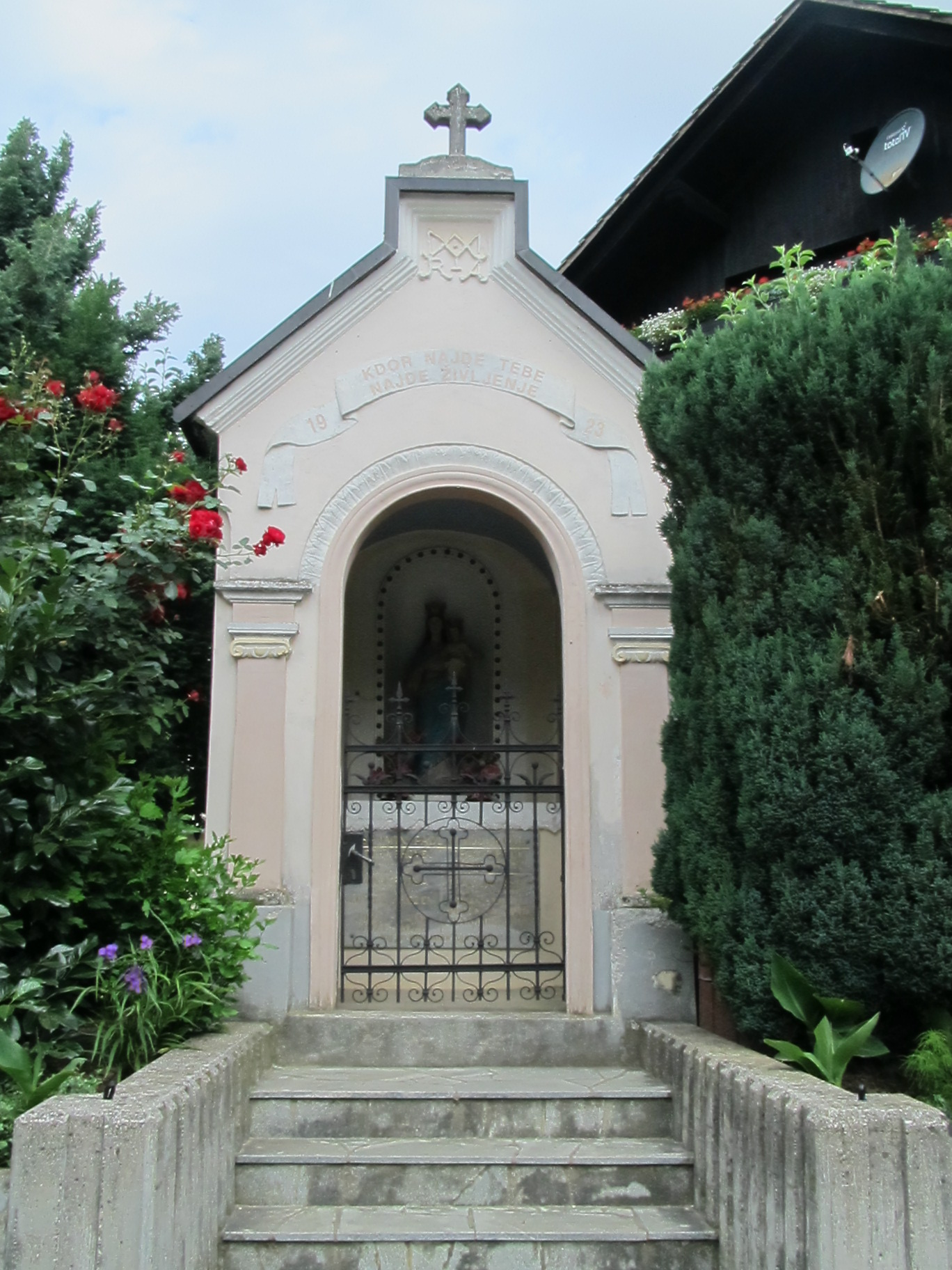
Shrine to Our Lady of Peace in Žažar

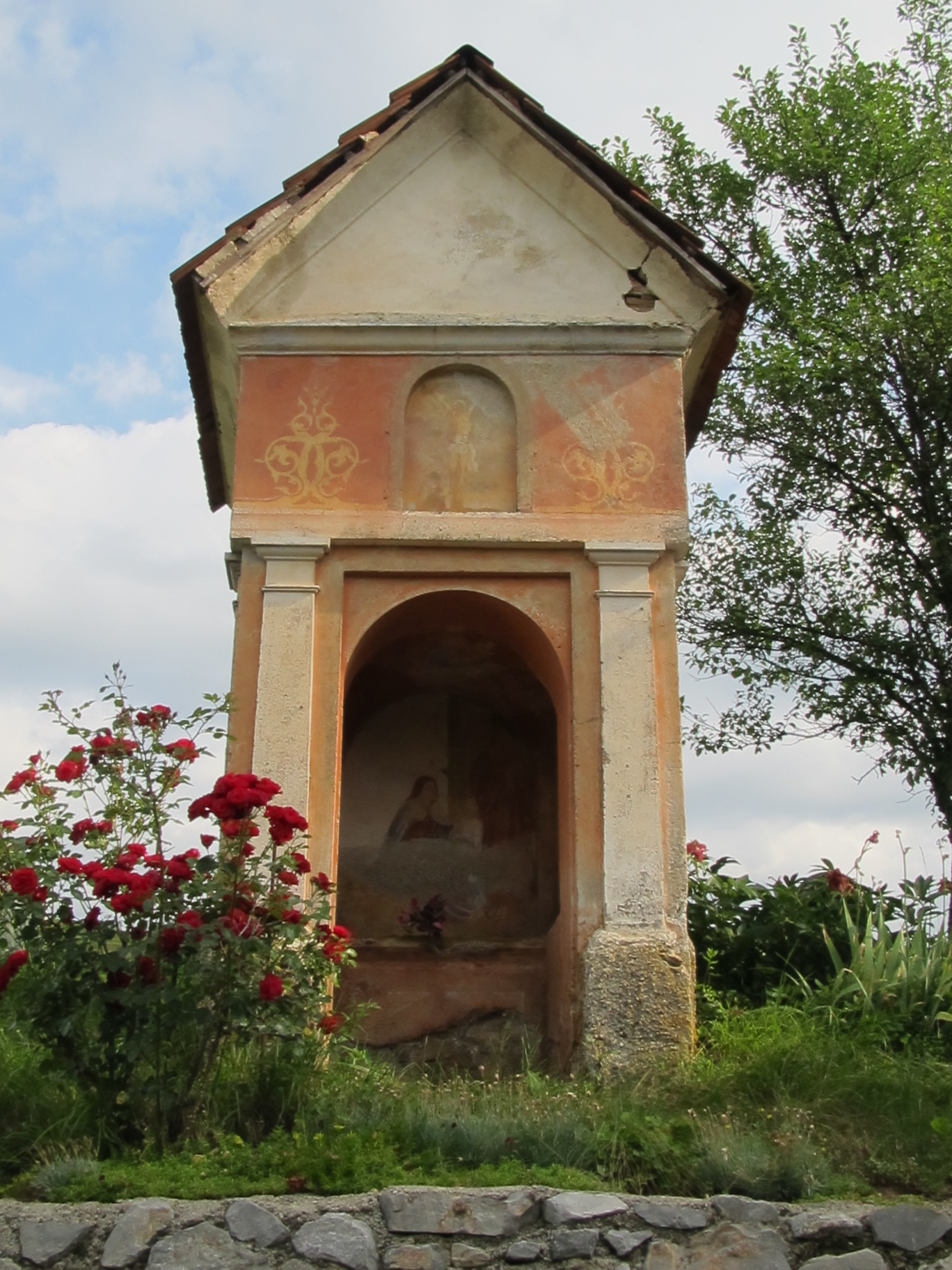
Shrine opposite the former fire station in Žažar

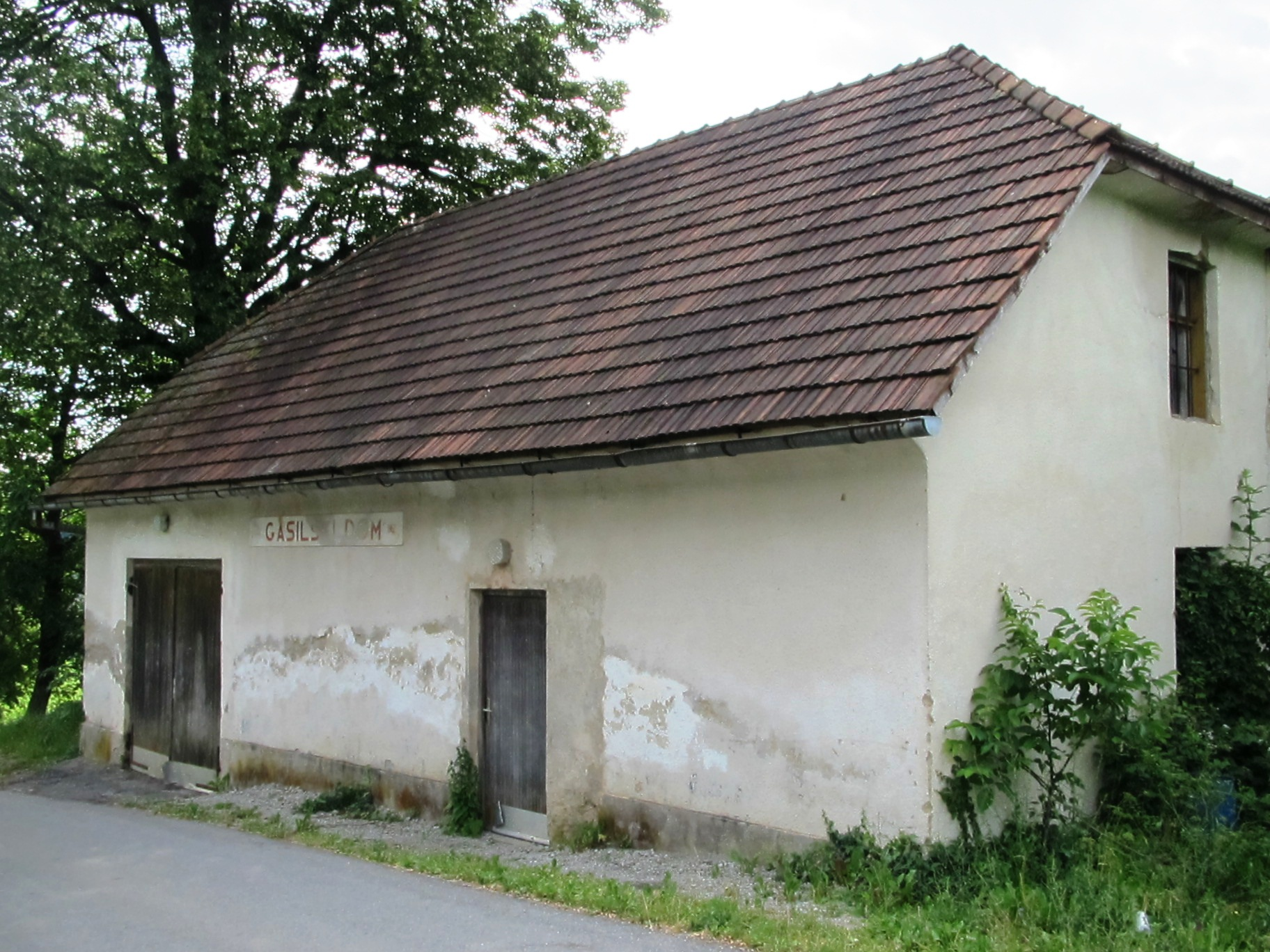
The former fire station in Žažar (1932–1962)
