= Horjul, Horjul =

Horjul
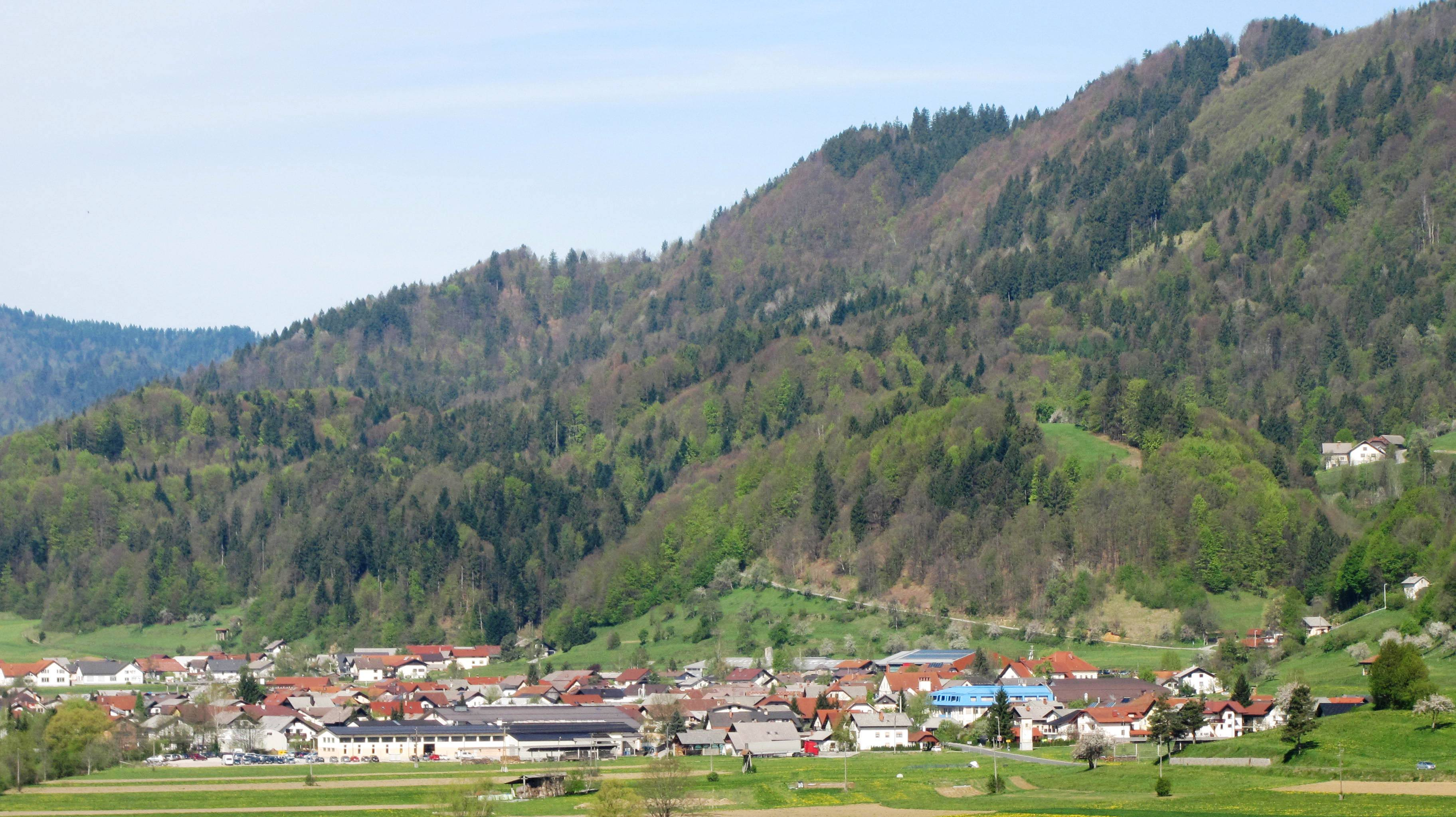

- Location in Slovenia
- Coordinates: 46°1′22.64″N 14°17′53.28″E
- Country: Slovenia
- Traditional region: Inner Carniola
- Statistical region: Central Slovenia
- Municipality: Horjul
- Elevation: 339.8 m (1,115 ft)

Population (2002)
  - Total: 1,169

Horjul (pronounced [xɔˈɾjuːl]) is a small town in the Inner Carniola region of Slovenia. It is the administrative center of the Municipality of Horjul. Horjul developed from a clustered village on the north side of the marshy valley of Horjulka Creek and includes the hamlets of Vovčne and Lipalca. Elevations in the territory of the settlement include Brezovec Hill (471 m), Rog Hill (448 m), and Lupar Hill (Slovene: Luparjev grič) (ca. 420 m) to the north, and Rožman Peak (Slovene: Rožmanski vrh) (452 m), Kremenik Hill (406 m), and Čelc Hill (391 m) to the south.

== Name ==
The origin of the name Horjul is unclear; various theories have tried to derive it from a Romance or Celtic root. In the local dialect, the town is known as Hrjuj or Hurjujc in the lowlands, and as Frjuj or Frjujc in the hills above the settlement.

== History ==
A prehistoric Celtic cemetery was discovered in the village at the beginning of the 20th century. Although the finds have since been lost, this late Iron Age site is the only evidence of a Celtic presence in the Horjul Valley. The discovery of some Roman-era water pipes is associated with the Polhov Gradec Villa rustica. Known as the Vovčne–Saint Margaret archaeological site, the cemetery is registered as cultural heritage.

A part-time school was established in Horjul in the sexton's house in 1855. A regular school was established in 1861. The following year, the sexton's house was torn down and replaced by a new school building. The current school building dates from 1975.

=== Second World War ===
Horjul was annexed to Italy as part of the Province of Ljubljana on 3 May 1941. Partisan activity began in the Horjul area in June 1941. The mayor of Horjul, Janez (or Ivan) Bastič and his wife Marjana were abducted, tortured, and murdered by the Partisans on 14 June 1942. A White Guard post was established in Horjul in November 1942. After the capitulation of Italy in September 1943, this was converted to a Home Guard post. Horjul was bombarded by German forces in November 1943, with the loss of several houses. The Partisans launched an unsuccessful attack against the Home Guard post on 8 September 1944.

== Religious heritage ==
=== Church ===
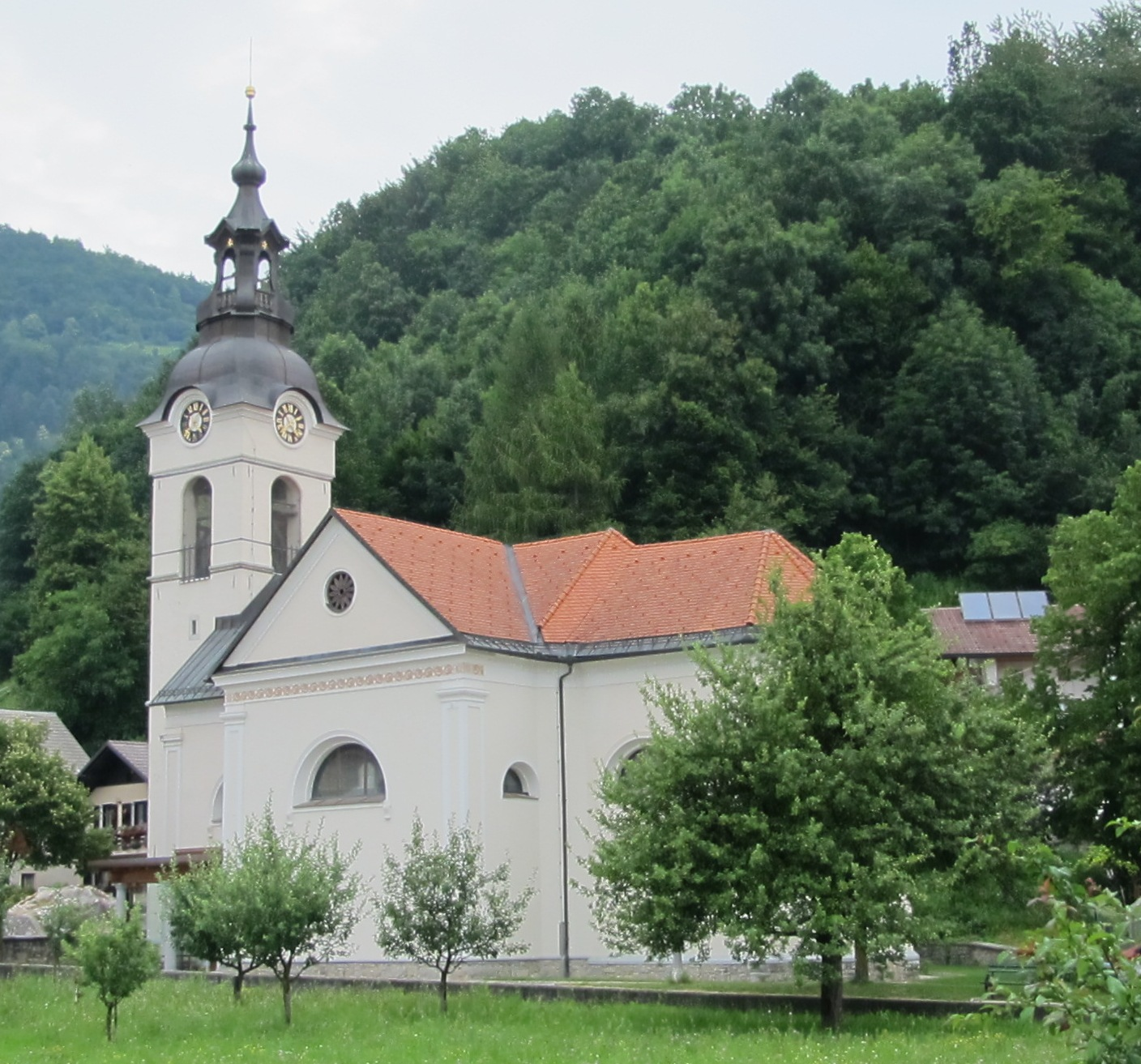
Saint Margaret's Church

The parish church in the town of Horjul is dedicated to Saint Margaret and belongs to the Ljubljana Archdiocese. It was first mentioned in written sources in 1526. The church was originally built in Gothic style and was renovated in 1678. The rectory dates from 1787, when the Parish of Horjul was established. Two side chapels were built in 1858 following plans by Anton Leben from Polhov Gradec. The church's frescoes depicting Saint Margaret and various saints were painted in 1877 by Janez Šubic, who also created the altar painting of Saint Margaret in 1876. The church's main altar and side altar were made by the Toman workshop of Ljubljana.

=== Cemetery ===
The town's walled cemetery was reworked in 1922 and 1923 following plans by Jože Plečnik. It lies in the northern part of the town, northwest of the school and Saint Margaret's Church. In the center, there is a large wooden crucifix bearing the year 1881 and a monument. There are several gravestones from the 18th and early 19th centuries.

=== Shrines ===
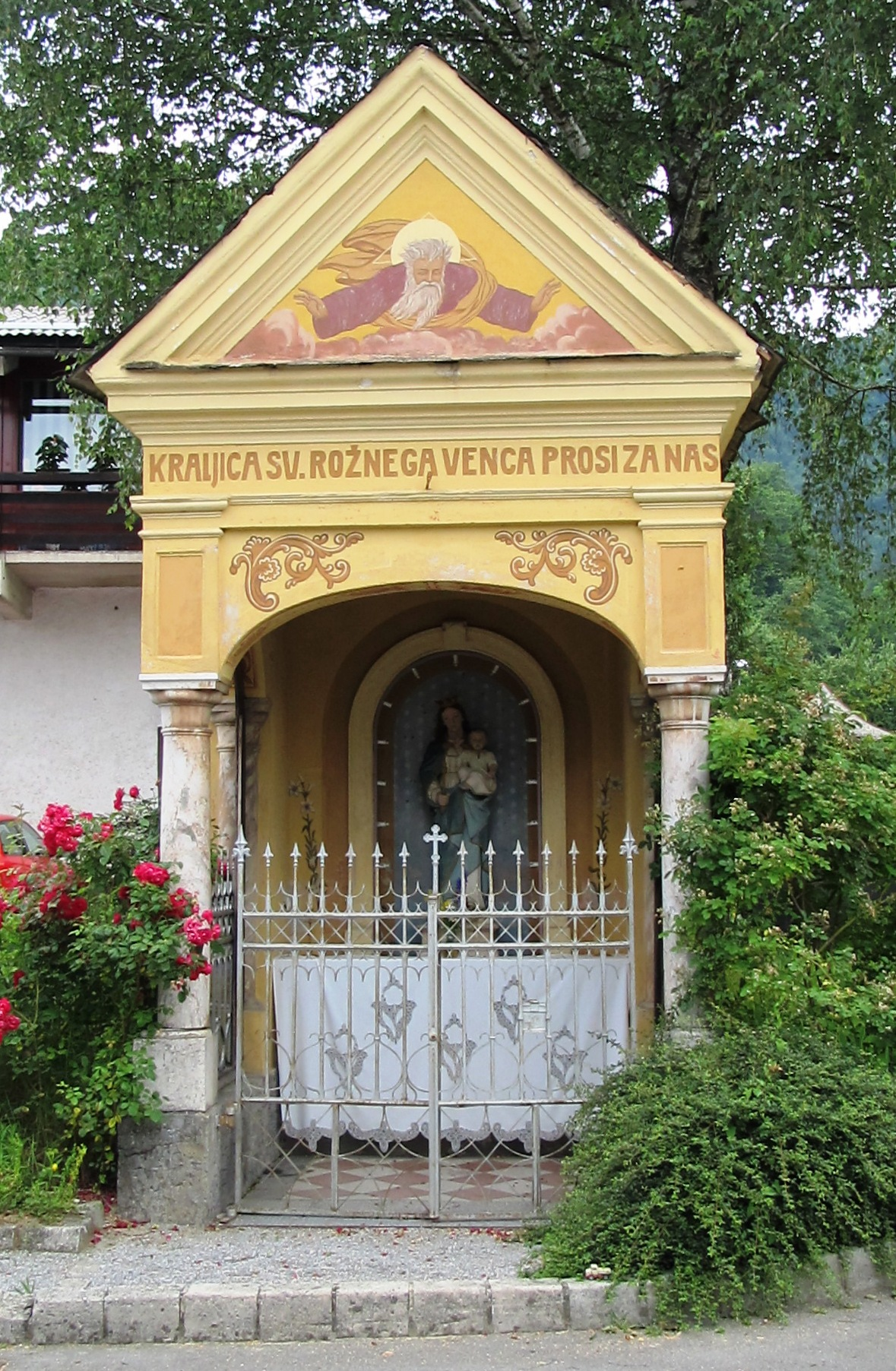
Chapel-shrine dedicated to Our Lady of the Rosary

Several wayside shrines in Horjul are registered as cultural heritage:

- There is a closed two-story chapel-shrine north of the road in the center of the town. It has a square hip roof topped by a small belfry. It was built and designed in 1923 by the architect Janko Omahen (1898–1980) and dedicated to Saint Anthony.
- An open chapel-shrine dedicated to Our Lady of the Rosary stands in the northern part of the town, west of the school. It dates from 1895 and has a painted interior with a statue of the Virgin Mary in a niche.
- An open chapel-shrine dedicated to Saint Joseph stands near the woods in the northern part of the town. It contains a statue of the saint and was dedicated on 2 December 1898 in honor of the fiftieth anniversary of the rule of Emperor Franz Joseph I.

== Other cultural heritage ==
In addition to its religious cultural heritage, several other structures in Horjul are registered as cultural heritage:

- The farm at Livada no. 3 (formerly Horjul no. 19) stands in the southeastern part of the village center. It has a stone two-story house with the year 1830 carved into the door casing. It has a symmetrical gabled roof covered with concrete tiles. A barn is connected to the house; it has a wooden upper story.
- The farm at Vrhnika Street (Slovene: Vrhniška cesta) no. 150 stand on Mavsar Hill (Slovene: Mavsarjev hrib), north of Velika Ligojna and east of Žažar. It has a one-story rectangular stone house with the year 1843 carved into the black stone door casing and a statue of Saint Florian in a niche in the gable. There is a barn, partially built of wood, with the year 1840 carved into it, a hayrack, an herb garden, and a linden tree in the courtyard.

== Notable people ==
Notable people that were born or lived in Horjul include:

- Kristina Brenk (1911–2009), writer of juvenile literature and translator
- Cene Logar (1913–1995), philosopher and communist-era dissident
- Janez Logar (1908–1987), literary historian
- Tine Logar (1916–2002), linguist and Slavic specialist
- Anton Oblak (1871–1953), rural writer
- Janez Potrebuješ (1830–1904), sculptor
- Rudolf Hribernik a.k.a. "Svarun" (1921–2002), Yugoslav general and politician
- Aleš Stanovnik (1901–1942), political activist and journalist
- Ivan Stanovnik (1891–?), writer of juvenile literature and political activist
- Andrej Zamejic (1824–1907), religious writer and translator
