= Mali Vrh =

Mali Vrh may refer to several places in Slovenia:

- Mali Vrh, Brežice, a settlement in the Municipality of Brežice
- Mali Vrh, Dobrova–Polhov Gradec, a hamlet of Setnik in the Municipality of Dobrova–Polhov Gradec
- Mali Vrh, Mirna Peč, a settlement in the Municipality of Mirna Peč
- Mali Vrh pri Prežganju, a settlement in the City Municipality of Ljubljana
- Mali Vrh pri Šmarju, a settlement in the Municipality of Grosuplje
- Mali Vrh, Šmartno ob Paki, a settlement in the Municipality of Šmartno ob Paki
- Mali Vrh, Sveta Ana, a hamlet of Kremberk in the Municipality of Sveta Ana
