= Mali Vrh, Sveta Ana =

Mali Vrh
- Location in Slovenia
- Coordinates: 46°38′07″N 15°50′23″E
- Country: Slovenia
- Traditional region: Styria
- Statistical region: Drava
- Municipality: Sveta Ana
- Elevation: 336 m (1,102 ft)

Mali Vrh (Slovene pronunciation: [ˈmaːli ˈʋəɾx], formerly also Plinbreg, German: Kleinberg) is a former settlement in the Municipality of Sveta Ana in northeastern Slovenia. It is now part of the village of Kremberk. The area is part of the traditional region of Styria. The municipality is now included in the Drava Statistical Region.

== Geography ==
Mali Vrh stands along a ridge south of the village center of Kremberk, just west of Zgornja Ročica.

== History ==
Mali Vrh was annexed by Kremberk in 1952, ending its existence as an independent settlement.
