= Zgornji Dražen Vrh =

Zgornji Dražen Vrh Dražen Vrh (until 2002)
- Location in Slovenia
- Coordinates: 46°40′5.79″N 15°47′19.91″E
- Country: Slovenia
- Traditional region: Styria
- Statistical region: Drava
- Municipality: Šentilj

Area
  - Total: 1.96 km^{2} (0.76 sq mi)
- Elevation: 353.2 m (1,159 ft)

Population (2002)
  - Total: 140

Zgornji Dražen Vrh (pronounced [ˈzɡoːɾnji ˈdɾaːʒɛɱ ˈʋəɾx]; known as Dražen Vrh until 2002) is a dispersed settlement in the Slovene Hills (Slovene: Slovenske gorice) in northeastern Slovenia. The northern part of the settlement belongs to the Municipality of Šentilj. The rest of the settlement belongs to the Municipality of Sveta Ana
