= Ljubljanica (disambiguation) =

Ljubljanica is a river in the southern part of the Ljubljana Basin, Slovenia.

Ljubljanica may also refer to:

== Slovenia ==
- Ljubljanica (creek), a creek in Velika Loka, Grosuplje
- Ljubljanica, Butajnova, a hamlet in the village of Butajnova
- Ljubljanica, Stomaž, a hamlet in the village of Stomaž, Ajdovščina
- Ljubljanica, Žalna, a hamlet in the village of Žalna

== Croatia ==
- Ljubljanica, Sisak-Moslavina County, a settlement near Martinska Ves
- Ljubljanica, Zagreb, a neighbourhood of Zagreb
