= Dražen Vrh, Sveta Ana =

Dražen Vrh
- Location in Slovenia
- Coordinates: 46°40′5.79″N 15°47′19.91″E
- Country: Slovenia
- Traditional region: Styria
- Statistical region: Drava
- Municipality: Sveta Ana

Area
  - Total: 1.96 km^{2} (0.76 sq mi)
- Elevation: 353.2 m (1,159 ft)

Population (2002)
  - Total: 140

Dražen Vrh (pronounced [ˈdɾaːʒɛɱ ˈʋəɾx]) is a dispersed settlement in the Slovene Hills in northeastern Slovenia. The southern part of the settlement belongs to the territory of the Municipality of Sveta Ana. The rest of the settlement belongs to the Municipality of Šentilj
