= Froleh =

- Location in Slovenia
- Coordinates: 46°38′33.52″N 15°51′43.79″E
- Country: Slovenia
- Traditional region: Styria
- Statistical region: Drava
- Municipality: Sveta Ana

Area
  - Total: 1.02 km^{2} (0.39 sq mi)
- Elevation: 317.5 m (1,042 ft)

Population (2002)
  - Total: 128

Froleh (pronounced [ˈfɾoːlɛx]) is a road-side settlement in the Slovene Hills in the Municipality of Sveta Ana in northeastern Slovenia.

There is a small chapel in the settlement. It was built in the early 20th century by extending an existing older chapel and adding a small belfry.
