= Rožengrunt =

- Location in Slovenia
- Coordinates: 46°40′35.97″N 15°48′44.58″E
- Country: Slovenia
- Traditional region: Styria
- Statistical region: Drava
- Municipality: Sveta Ana

Area
  - Total: 3.55 km^{2} (1.37 sq mi)
- Elevation: 306.7 m (1,006 ft)

Population (2002)
  - Total: 182

Rožengrunt (pronounced [ˈɾoːʒənɡɾunt]) is a dispersed settlement in the Municipality of Sveta Ana in the Slovene Hills in northeastern Slovenia.

There is a large chapel in the settlement. It is dedicated to The Visitation of the Virgin Mary. It has a sanctuary with a two-storey belfry and dates to the early 20th century.
