= Lokavec, Sveta Ana =

Lokavec
- Location in Slovenia
- Coordinates: 46°41′39.23″N 15°48′29.05″E
- Country: Slovenia
- Traditional region: Styria
- Statistical region: Drava
- Municipality: Sveta Ana

Area
  - Total: 2.9 km^{2} (1.1 sq mi)
- Elevation: 401.8 m (1,318 ft)

Population (2013)
  - Total: 206

Lokavec (pronounced [lɔˈkaːʋəts]) is a settlement in the Municipality of Sveta Ana in the Slovene Hills in northeastern Slovenia.
