= Butajnova =

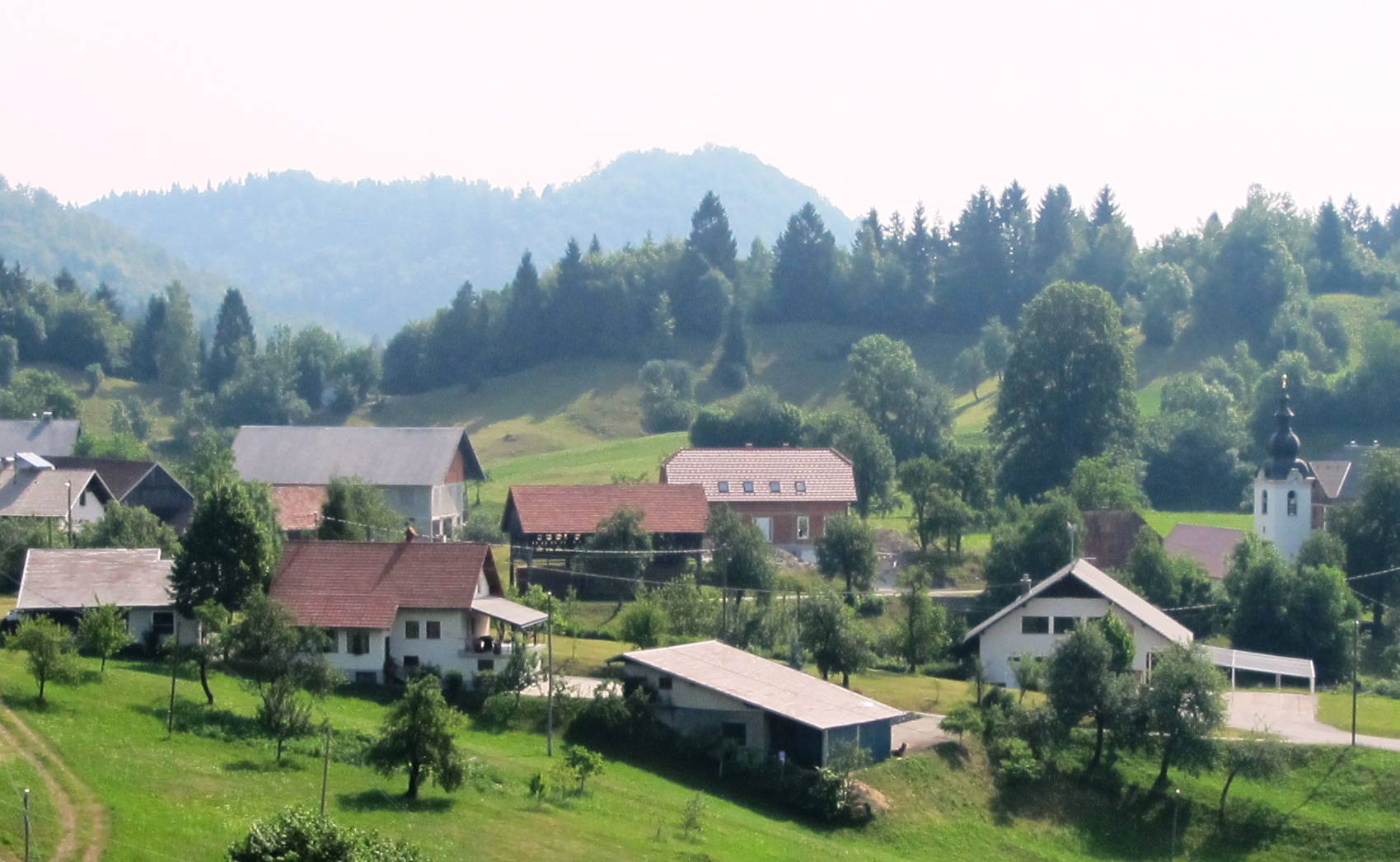

- Location in Slovenia
- Coordinates: 46°2′33.43″N 14°14′7.72″E
- Country: Slovenia
- Traditional region: Upper Carniola
- Statistical region: Central Slovenia
- Municipality: Dobrova–Polhov Gradec

Area
  - Total: 6.32 km^{2} (2.44 sq mi)
- Elevation: 685.3 m (2,248 ft)

Population (2020)
  - Total: 232
  - Density: 36.7/km^{2} (95.1/sq mi)

Butajnova (pronounced [buˈtaːi̯nɔʋa]; German: Wutainowa) is a village in the Municipality of Dobrova–Polhov Gradec in the Upper Carniola region of Slovenia. It is surrounded by Hrib Hill (805 m) to the west and Prevalca Hill (705 m) to the east. Butajnova itself is on a plateau that gradually rises to Klešč Hill (784 m) to the northeast and descends to the valley of Little Creek (Slovene: Mala Voda) to the west, south, and east. The village includes the hamlets of Ljubljanica, Kucelj, Roženija, Mala Vas (Mala vas), and Kurja Vas (Kurja vas), part of which also belongs to the neighboring settlement of Šentjošt nad Horjulom.

== Name ==
Butajnova was first mentioned in written sources in 1498 as Wetany, Betemi, and Petani. In the past it was known as Wutainowa in German. It is believed to be derived from a personal name of German origin.

== History ==
Several houses in the village were burned in 1943 during fighting between the Partisans and Anti-Communist Volunteer Militia forces. In 1944 the hamlet of Kucelj was burned by German forces. In 1953 the northeastern part of Butajnova, also known as Pusti Vrh, was assigned to the neighboring settlement of Setnik.

== Religious heritage ==
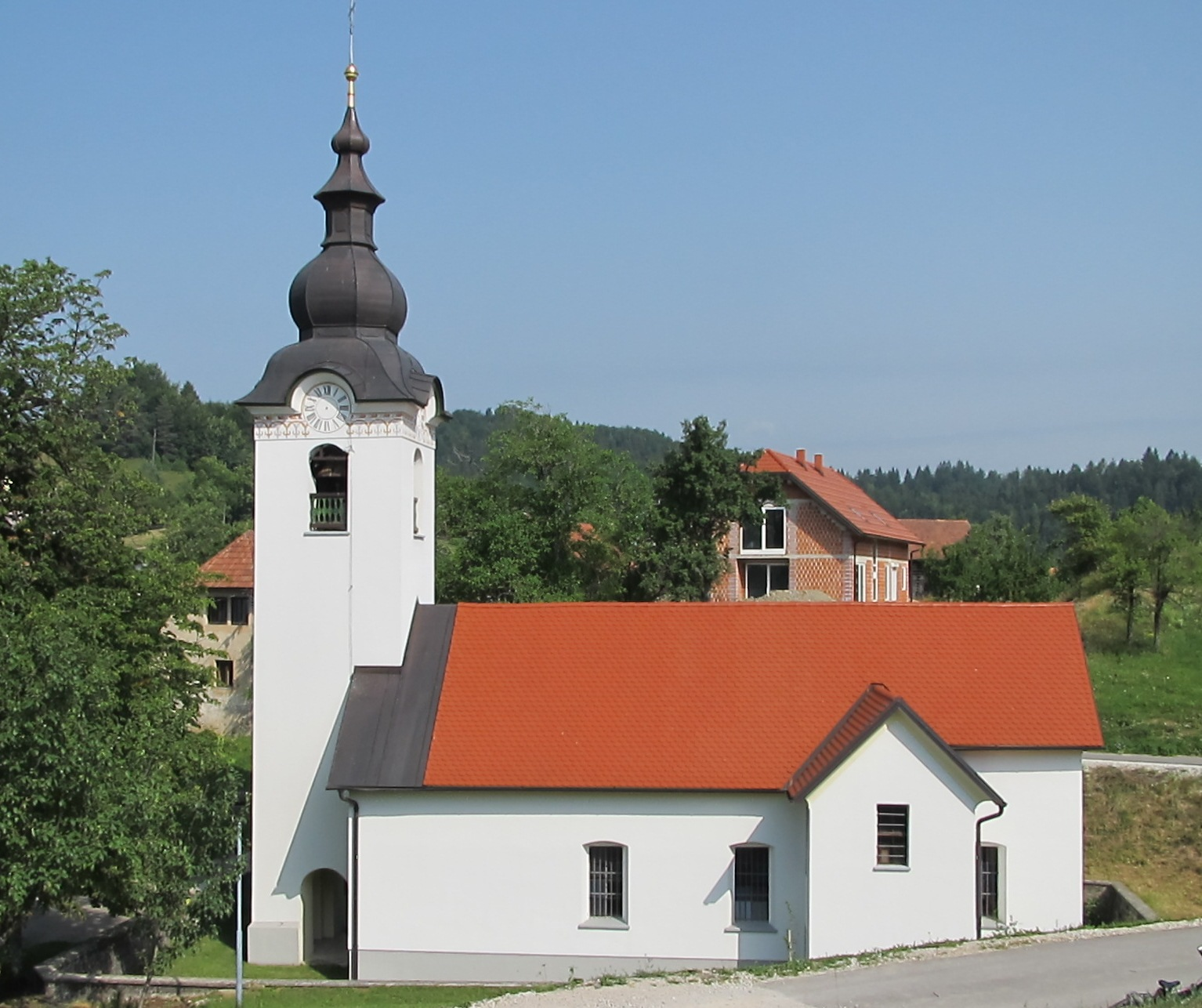
Saint Anne's Church

The local church is dedicated to Saint Anne. It was first mentioned in 1526 and it was consecrated in 1547. It was an originally Gothic structure that was remodeled in Baroque style in the mid-18th century, when the two side altars were added. The main altar is from the first half of the 19th century and the church also has a painting of Saint Anne by Josip Egartner. The painting dates from 1846 and was restored in 2010. The church has been registered as cultural heritage.

A shrine dedicated to the Virgin Mary stands south of the settlement, near Butajnova no. 19. This is a chapel-shrine without doors dating from around 1900. The shrine has been registered as cultural heritage.

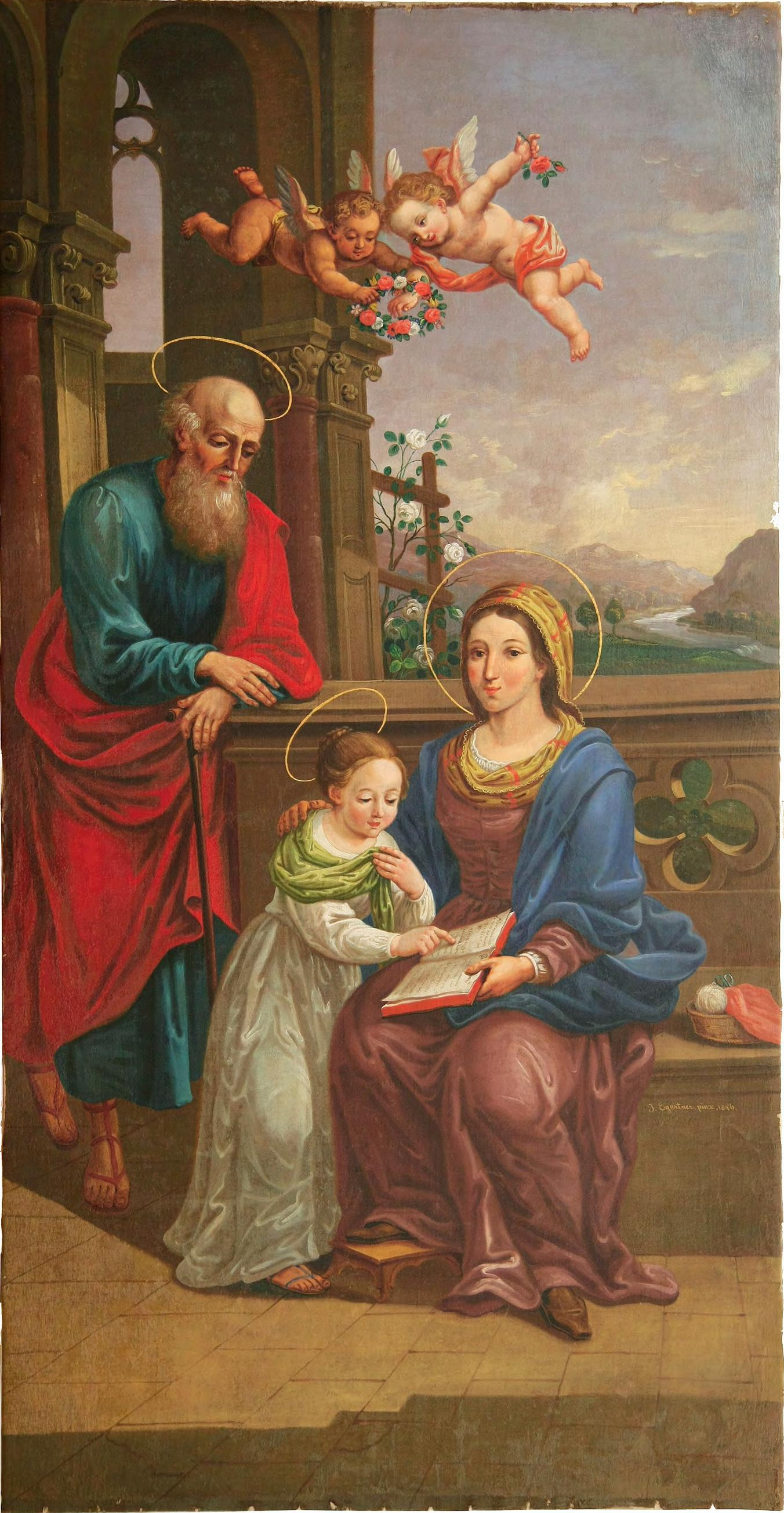
Egartner's painting of Saint Anne

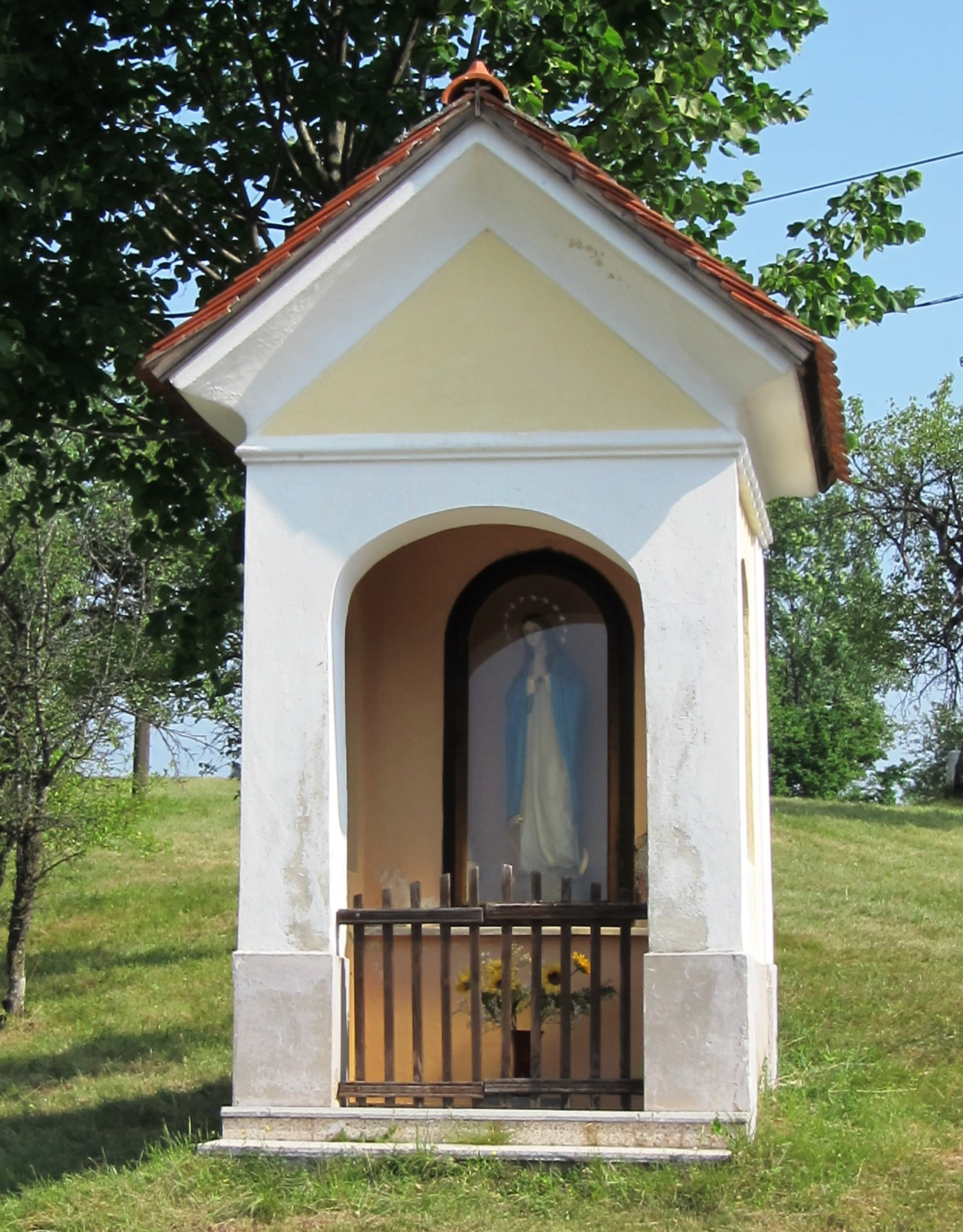
Shrine to the Virgin Mary south of the village

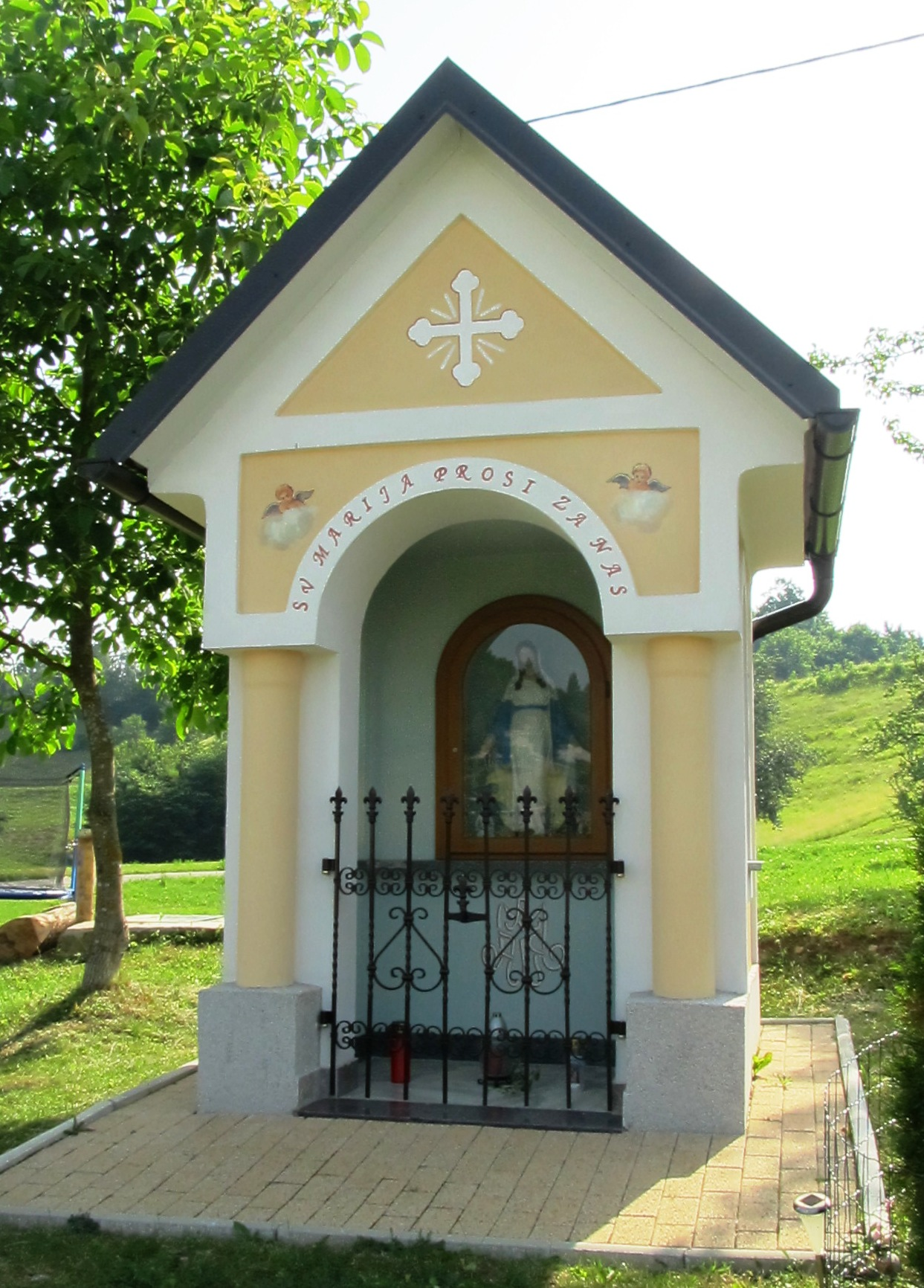
Shrine to the Virgin Mary above the church

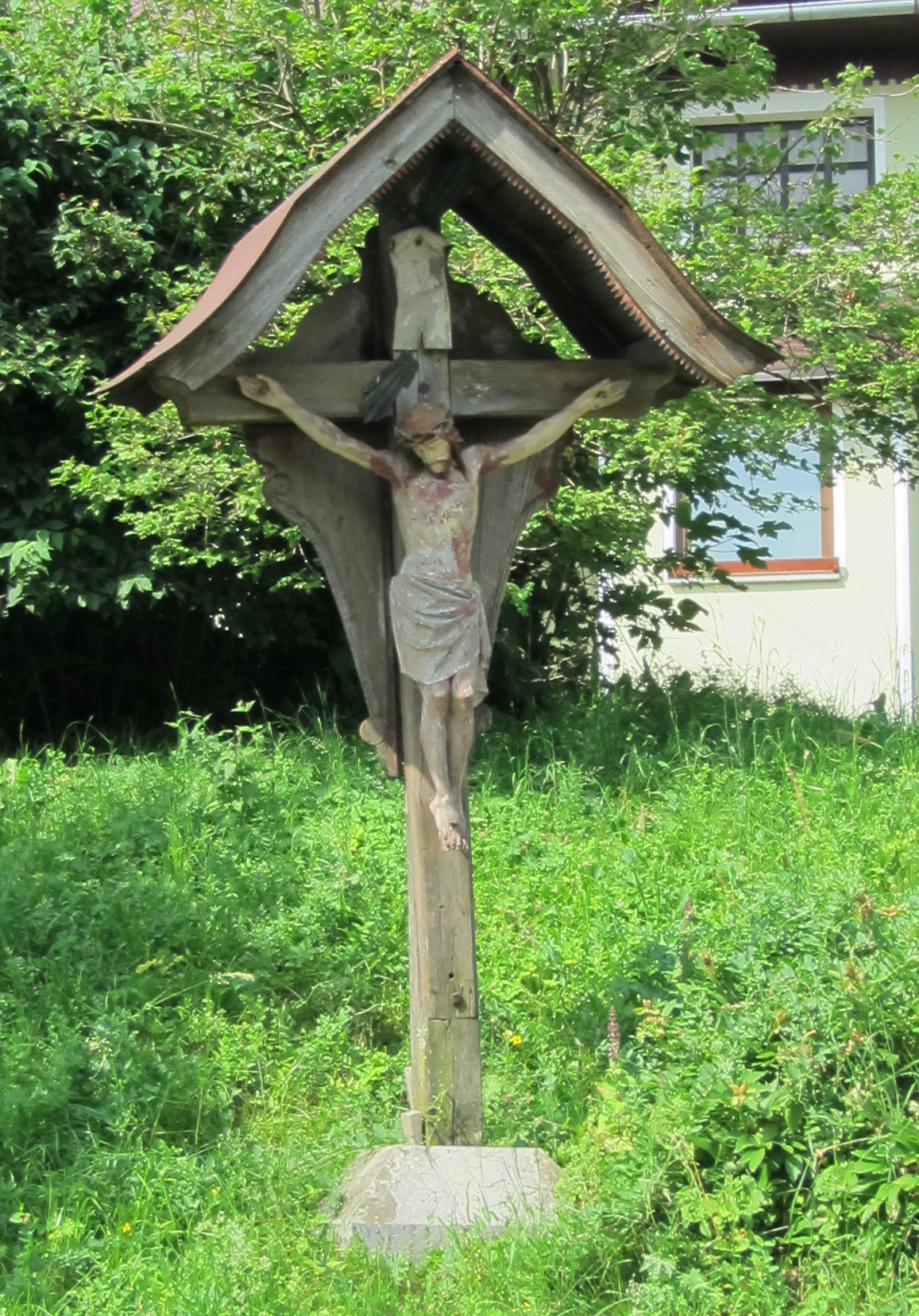
Crucifix in the center of the village

== Other cultural heritage ==
In addition to Saint Anne's Church and the shrine to the Virgin Mary, Butajnova has several other structures registered as cultural heritage:

- The Butajnova archaeological site is still largely unexplored. Artifacts from the Iron Age, the Roman era, and the Middle Ages have been discovered here. These finds are kept at the National Museum of Slovenia.
- The farm at Butajnova no. 1 is located in the hamlet of Kurja Vas. It consists of a single-story stone house on a slope with an extended gable on the projecting entryway of the building bearing the year 1929. The door is richly carved and the facade is segmented. There is a two-story barn.
- The farm at Butajnova no. 23 is located in the western part of the village. It has a two-story house with the year 1855 carved into the door casing and a decorated door. The interior of the building is preserved and the barn bears the year 1864. The construction elements indicate that this was a wealthy farm.
- The farm at Butajnova no. 31 is located in the northwest part of the village. It consists of a single-story farmhouse and a barn dating from 1864 built into the slope. Both of these structures preserve a number of ornamental construction elements, including a door casing carved from black limestone (1838), a shaped door, and woodwork details.
- The farm at Butajnova no. 46 is located at the extreme northern edge of the settlement. It consists of a single-story barnhouse with a living area made of logs and a masonry barn area, as well as more recent smaller structures: an outhouse, a woodshed, a room for preparing pig fodder, a granary with a semi-cellar, and a double hayrack with sides of two different heights.
- The house at Butajnova no. 24 is located in the southern part of the village. It is a rectangular single-story house with a half-hipped roof. Fragments of Baroque painting on the facade are preserved. The year 1840 is carved into the door casing made of black Lesno Brdo limestone.
- The village core of Butajnova has the character of a complete farming settlement; it preserved the historical layout of construction adapted to the broken relief of the area. It contains many preserved farmhouses and construction elements from older periods.
- The village well in Butajnova stands behind the house at Butajnova no. 28 and across from the house at Butajnova no. 31. It was installed in 1900 (renovated in 1999). It is built of stone and has a conical roof with wooden shingles. The well is 8.6 m deep and its diameter increases in its deeper part. It was in use until 1957, when a water supply system was installed in the village.

== Gallery ==
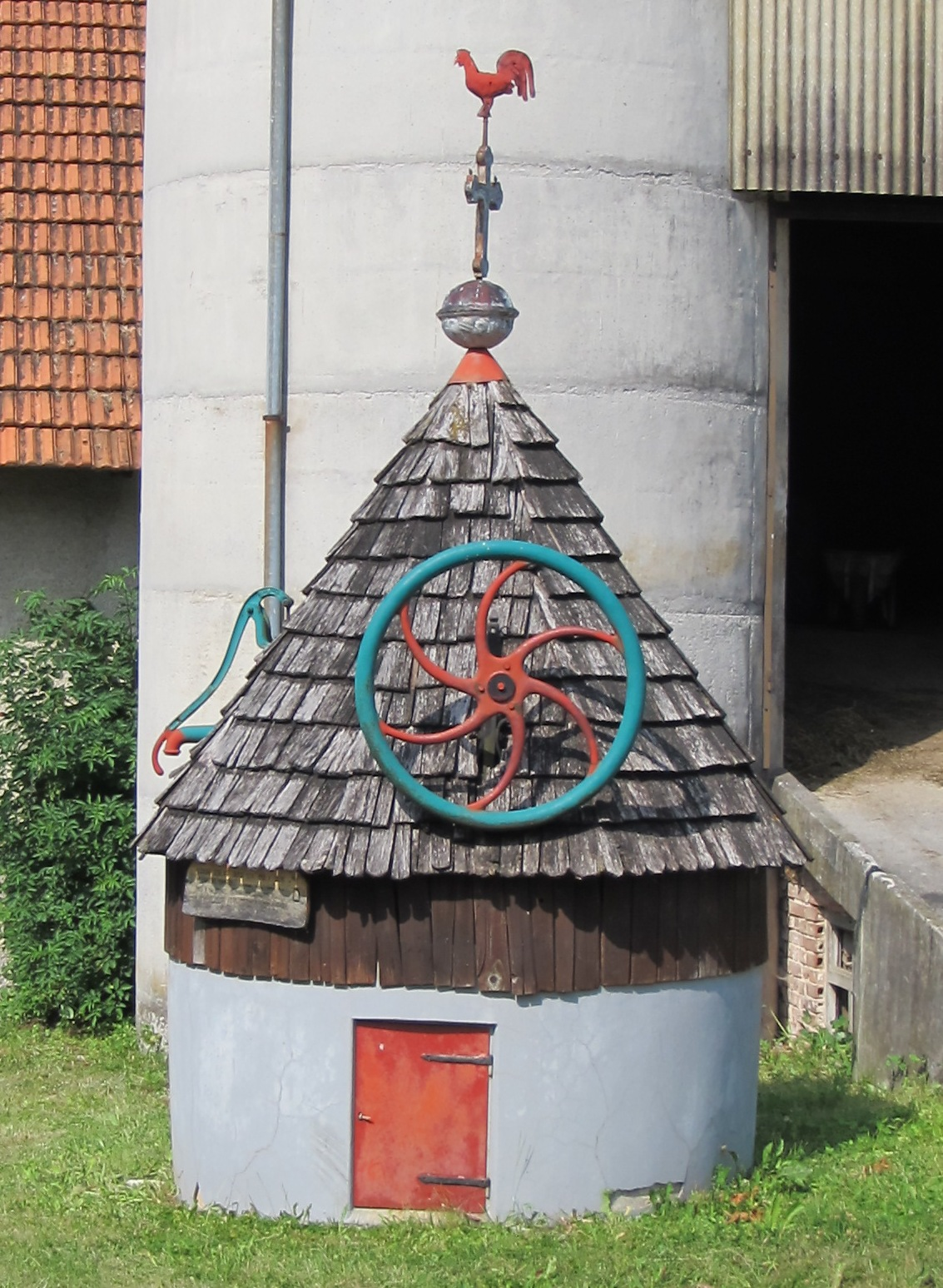
The village well in Butajnova

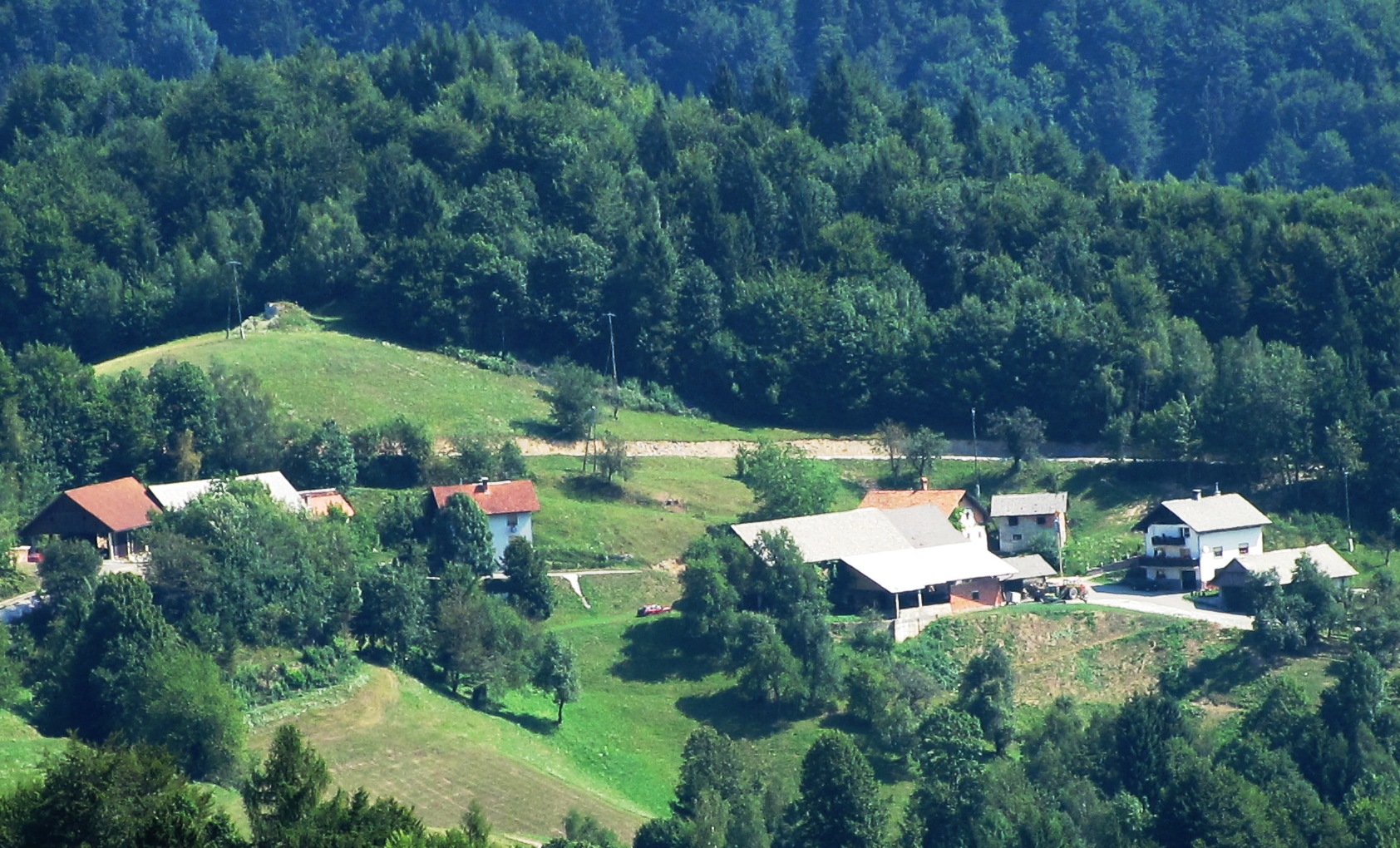
The hamlet of Roženija

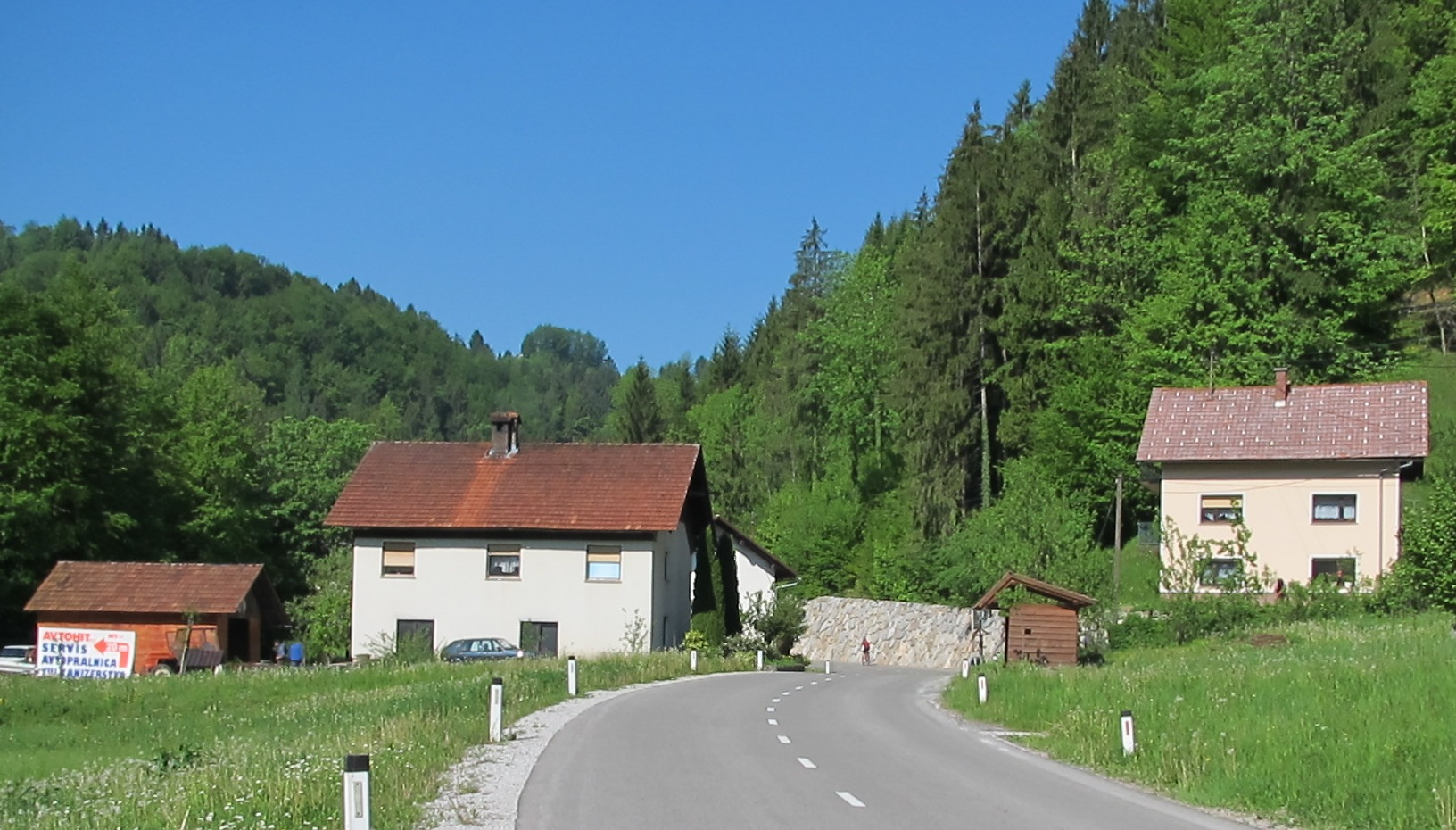
The hamlet of Ljubljanica
