= Zgornja Ščavnica =

- Location in Slovenia
- Coordinates: 46°39′50.13″N 15°50′36.8″E
- Country: Slovenia
- Traditional region: Styria
- Statistical region: Drava
- Municipality: Sveta Ana

Area
  - Total: 11.28 km^{2} (4.36 sq mi)
- Elevation: 252.9 m (830 ft)

Population (2002)
  - Total: 487

Zgornja Ščavnica (pronounced [ˈzɡoːɾnja ˈʃtʃaːu̯nitsa]) is a settlement in the Municipality of Sveta Ana in the Slovene Hills in northeastern Slovenia. It lies in the upper Ščavnica Valley.
