= Krivi Vrh =

- Location in Slovenia
- Coordinates: 46°38′22.12″N 15°51′8.81″E
- Country: Slovenia
- Traditional region: Styria
- Statistical region: Drava
- Municipality: Sveta Ana

Area
  - Total: 1.28 km^{2} (0.49 sq mi)
- Elevation: 311.8 m (1,023 ft)

Population (2002)
  - Total: 125

Krivi Vrh (pronounced [ˈkɾiːʋi ˈʋəɾx]) is a small settlement in the Municipality of Sveta Ana in the Slovene Hills in northeastern Slovenia.
