= Ledinek =

- Location in Slovenia
- Coordinates: 46°38′48.63″N 15°49′3.66″E
- Country: Slovenia
- Traditional region: Styria
- Statistical region: Drava
- Municipality: Sveta Ana

Area
  - Total: 3.45 km^{2} (1.33 sq mi)
- Elevation: 337.8 m (1,108 ft)

Population (2002)
  - Total: 210

Ledinek (pronounced [lɛˈdiːnɛk]) is a settlement in the Municipality of Sveta Ana in the Slovene Hills in northeastern Slovenia.
