= Sveta Ana v Slovenskih Goricah =

Locality and municipality of Slovenia

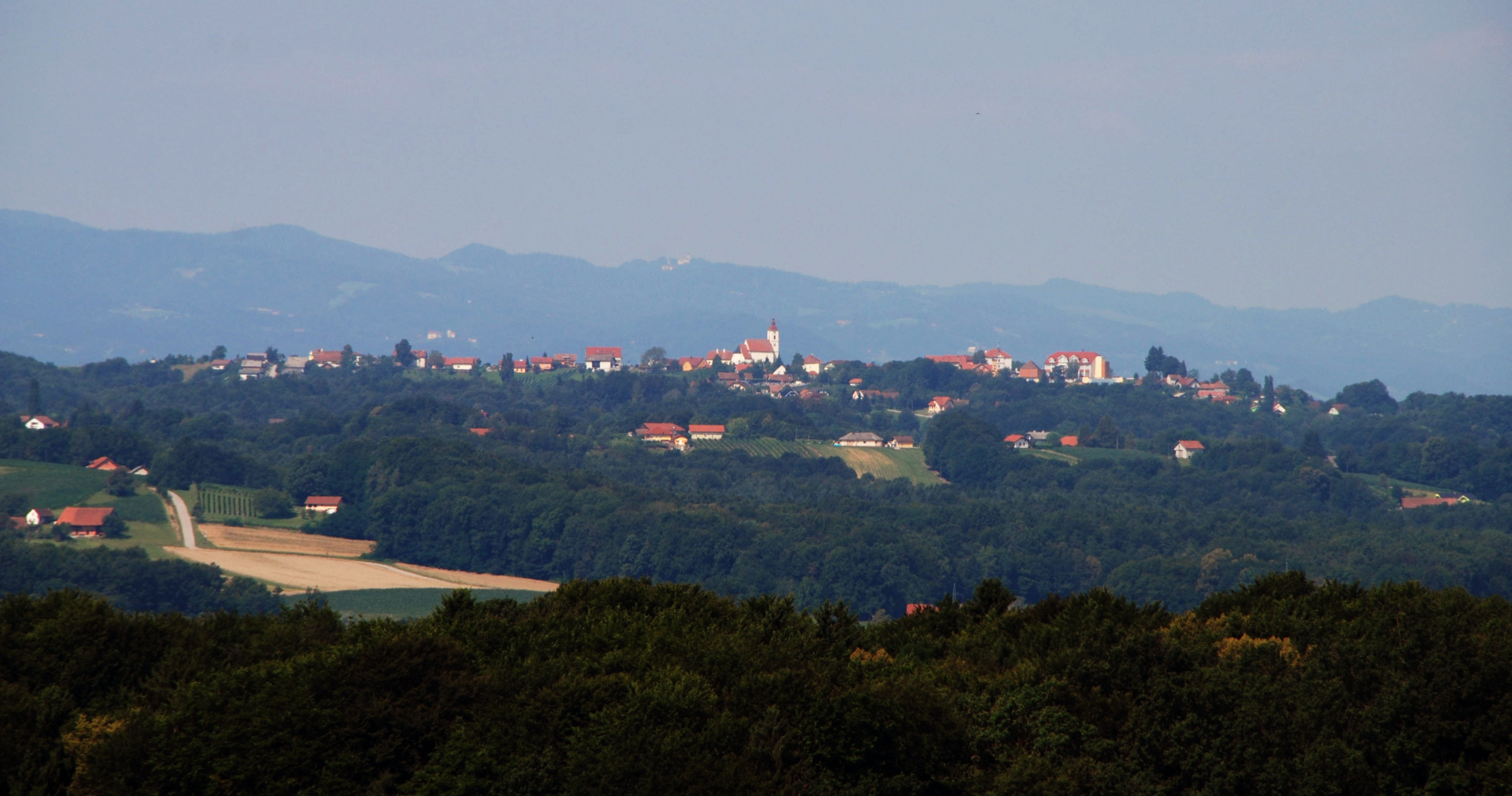
- Sveta Ana v Slovenskih Goricah from Aženski Vrh (east)

- Location in Slovenia
- Coordinates: 46°38′59″N 15°50′43″E
- Country: Slovenia
- Traditional region: Styria
- Statistical region: Drava
- Municipality: Sveta Ana

Area
  - Total: 0.7 km^{2} (0.27 sq mi)
- Elevation: 349 m (1,145 ft)

Population (2012)
  - Total: 159
  - Density: 243/km^{2} (630/sq mi)

Sveta Ana v Slovenskih Goricah (pronounced [ˈsʋeːta ˈaːna ʍ slɔˈʋeːnskiɣ ɡɔˈɾiːtsax]; Slovene: Sveta Ana v Slovenskih goricah) is a settlement in the Municipality of Sveta Ana in the Slovene Hills (Slovene: Slovenske gorice) in northeastern Slovenia.

== Parish church ==
The parish church, from which the settlement also gets its name, is dedicated to Saint Anne. It also features in the coat of arms of the municipality. It was built between 1693 and 1705 and renovated in the 19th century.
