= Šentjošt nad Horjulom =

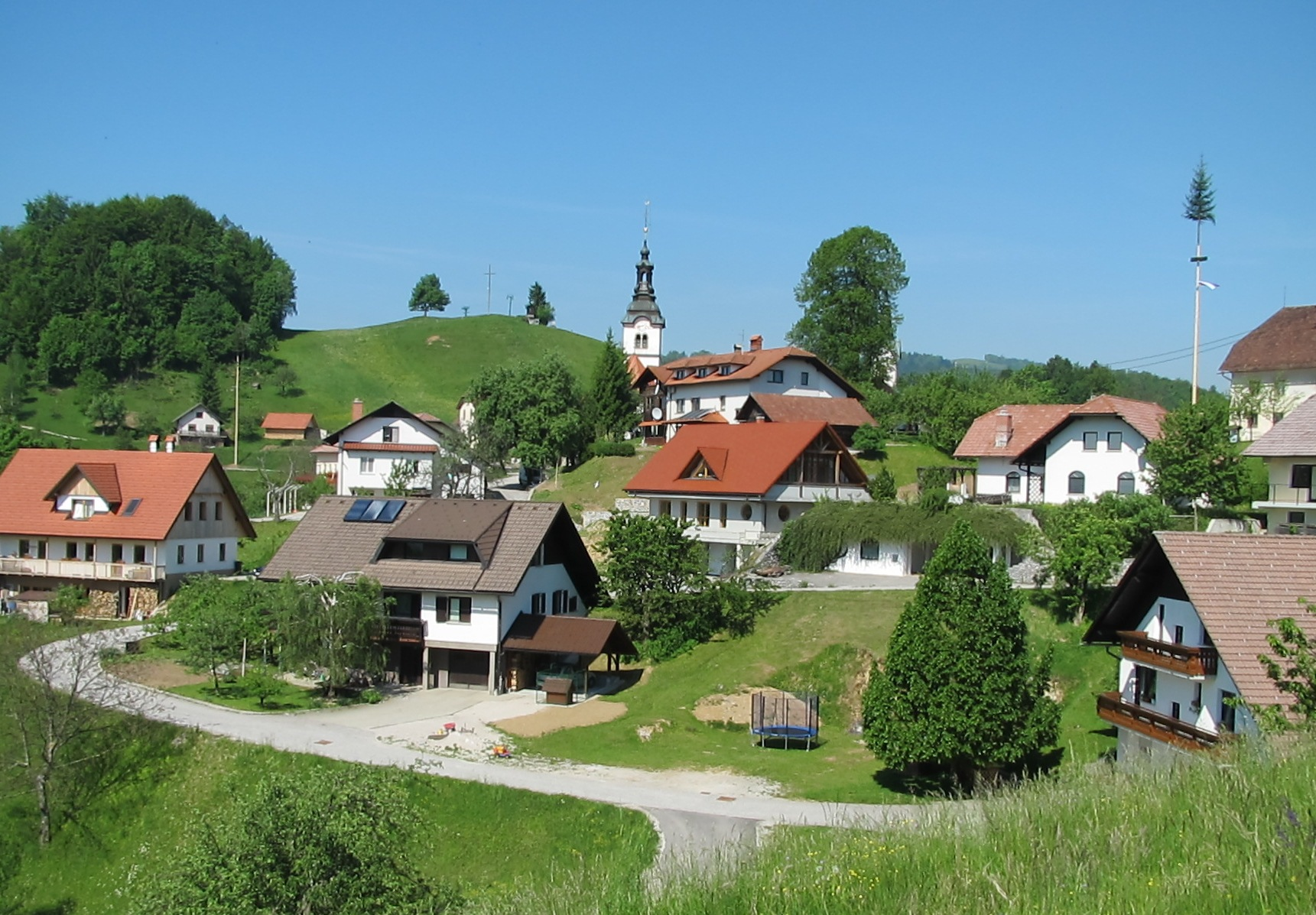

- Location in Slovenia
- Coordinates: 46°1′54.01″N 14°13′33.39″E
- Country: Slovenia
- Traditional region: Upper Carniola
- Statistical region: Central Slovenia
- Municipality: Dobrova–Polhov Gradec

Area
  - Total: 7.56 km^{2} (2.92 sq mi)
- Elevation: 619.1 m (2,031 ft)

Population (2020)
  - Total: 404
  - Density: 53.4/km^{2} (138/sq mi)

Šentjošt nad Horjulom (pronounced [ʃɛnˈtjóːʃt nat xɔˈɾjúːlɔm, ʃənˈ-]; German: Sankt Jobst) is a settlement in the Municipality of Dobrova–Polhov Gradec in the Upper Carniola region of Slovenia. In addition to the main settlement, it also includes the hamlets of Kogel, Krvinet, Kurja Vas (Slovene: Kurja vas), Paradiže, Pišek, Potok, and Stavnik, as well as part of the hamlet of Suhi Dol.

== Name ==
The name Šentjošt nad Horjulom literally means 'Šentjošt above Horjul'. The name Šentjošt is a fused compound of šent 'saint, holy' (< Latin sanctus) and Jošt 'Judoc(us), Josse' and is derived from the local church dedicated to the same saint. The settlement was formerly known as Sveti Jošt nad Vrhniko, Šentjošt nad Vrhniko (literally, 'Šentjošt above Vrhnika'), or simply Šent Jošt. The name of the settlement was official changed to Šentjošt nad Horjulom in 1955.

== History ==
Archaeological finds in Šentjošt nad Horjulom include two silver bracelets from the early Slavic period.

A part-time school was established in the rectory in 1810. A school building was built in 1900, and regular lessons started being held in 1923.

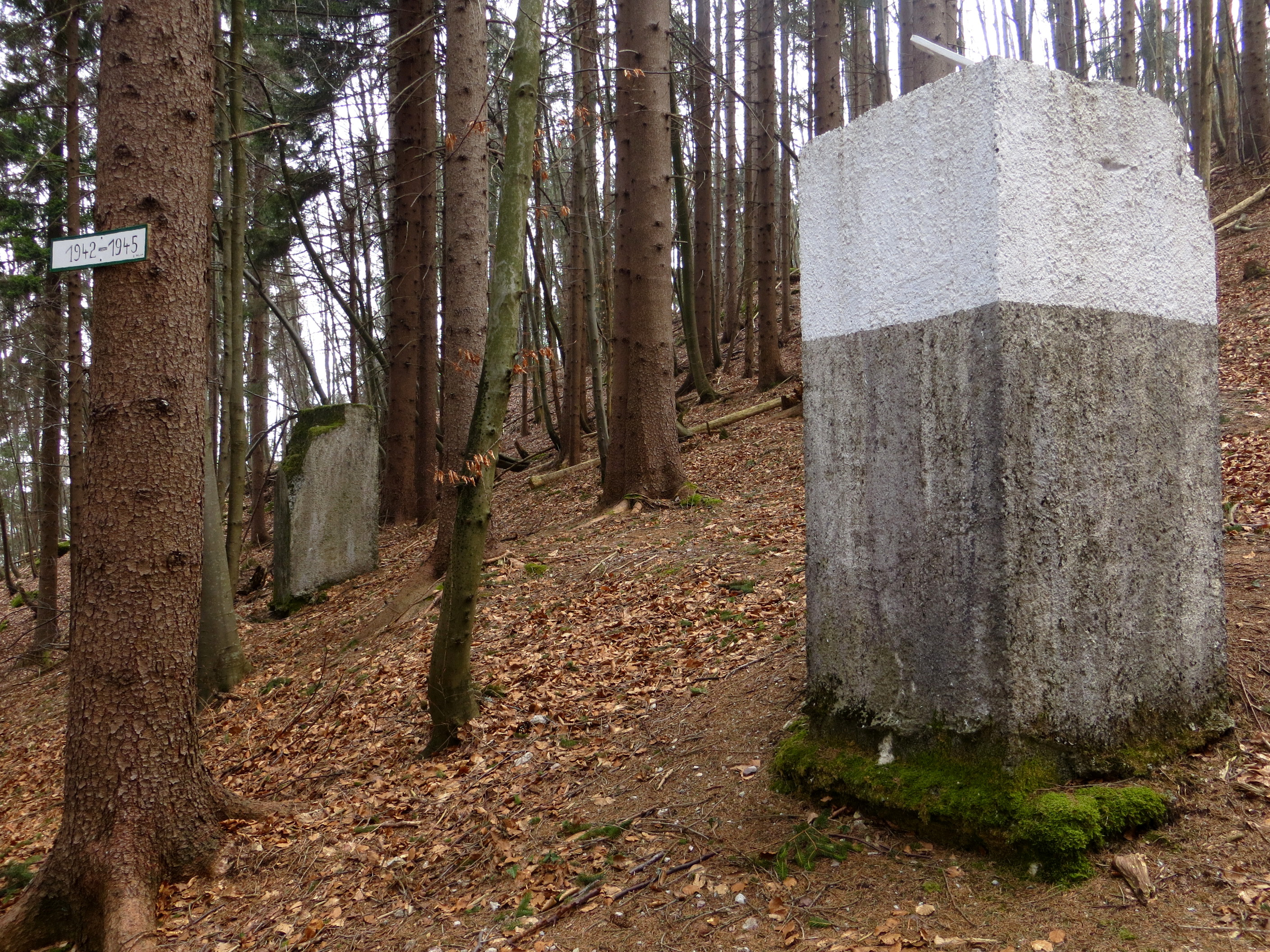
Watchtower foundation at Kovček Hill

Šentjost nad Horjulom was the site where the first Village Guard (Slovene: Vaška straža) was founded in Slovenia in July 1942. The settlement's anti-communist orientation resulted in a number of Partisan reprisals. On 24 July 1942 the village was attacked by Partisan forces numbering as many as 400. The Partisans, who were fought off by the local militia, then attacked surrounding villages as they retreated, killing 20 people (nine married men, three women, five unmarried men, two unmarried girls, and one child) and burning 16 farms. After the Second World War, there were almost no men left in the village, and the first postwar child was not born until 1955. There is a shrine next to the cemetery in Šentjost nad Horjulom dedicated to the non-communist dead of the Second World War, and in the cemetery itself there is a cross dedicated to the Slovene Home Guard.

During the war, the German–Italian border crossed through what is now the northern part of the village's territory. There was a major checkpoint along the road between the hamlets of Pišek (on the Italian side) and Paradiže (on the German side), and the remains of the foundation of a border watchtower stand on the northwest slope of Kovček Hill (786 meters or 2,579 feet).

== Religious heritage ==
The religious heritage in Šentjošt nad Horjulom consists of two churches and several wayside shrines.

=== Churches ===
There are two churches in the settlement. The parish church is dedicated to Saint John the Evangelist. The date 1664 is carved into the church's door casing and its furnishings date from the first half of the 19th century. The main altar dates from the end of the 18th century. It stands in the center of the village, south of Saint Josse's Church, and was declared a cultural monument in 2005. A second church is dedicated to Saint Josse (Slovene: sveti Jošt). It was first mentioned in written sources in 1401 and probably dates from the 13th century. One of the bells in the belfry was cast by the bell-maker Vivencius (active in the first half of the 14th century) and is dated 1354. The frescoes inside the church were produced by the Gorizia workshop between 1410 and 1420. The church was registered as a cultural monument in 2005.

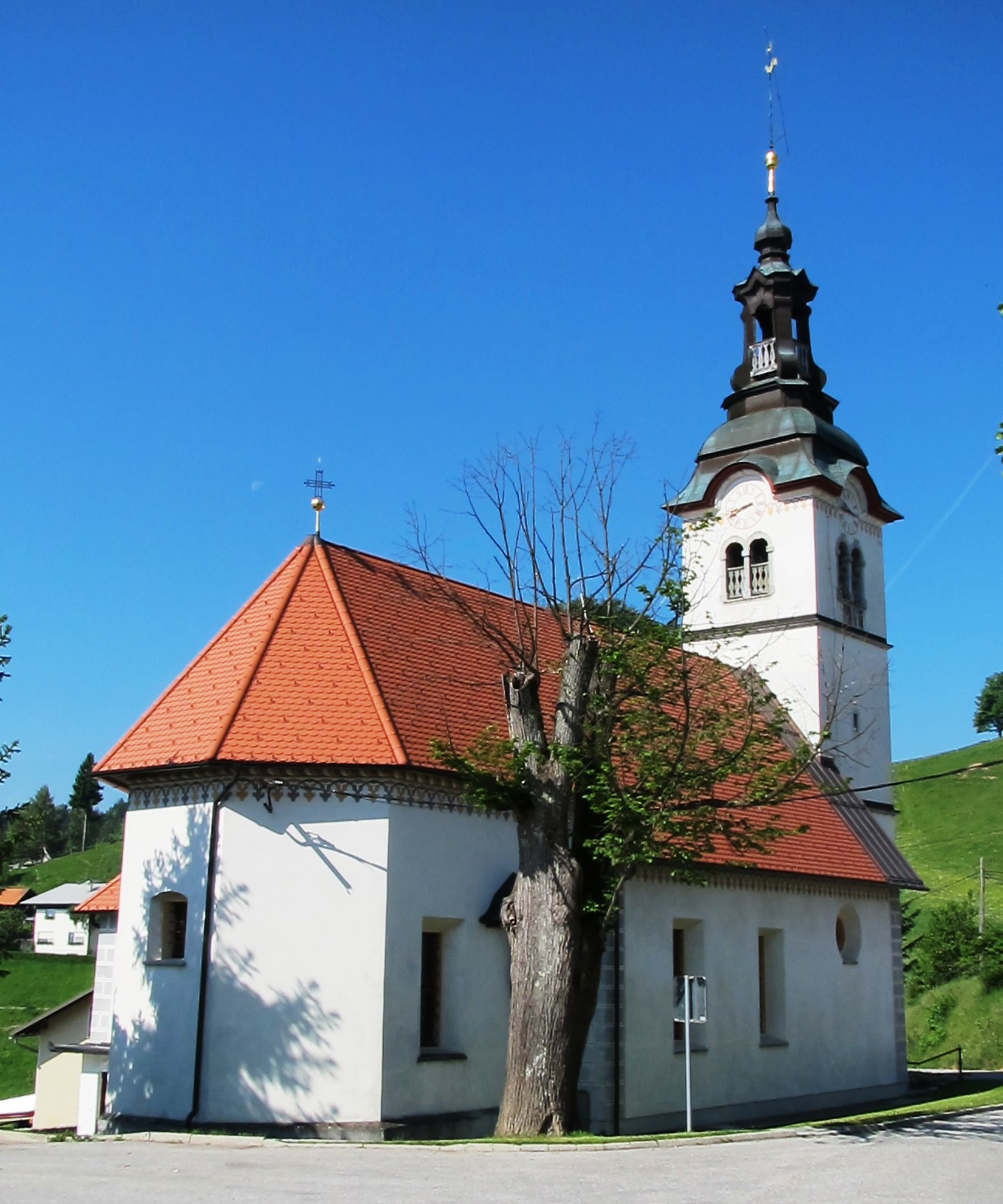
St. John the Evangelist Church

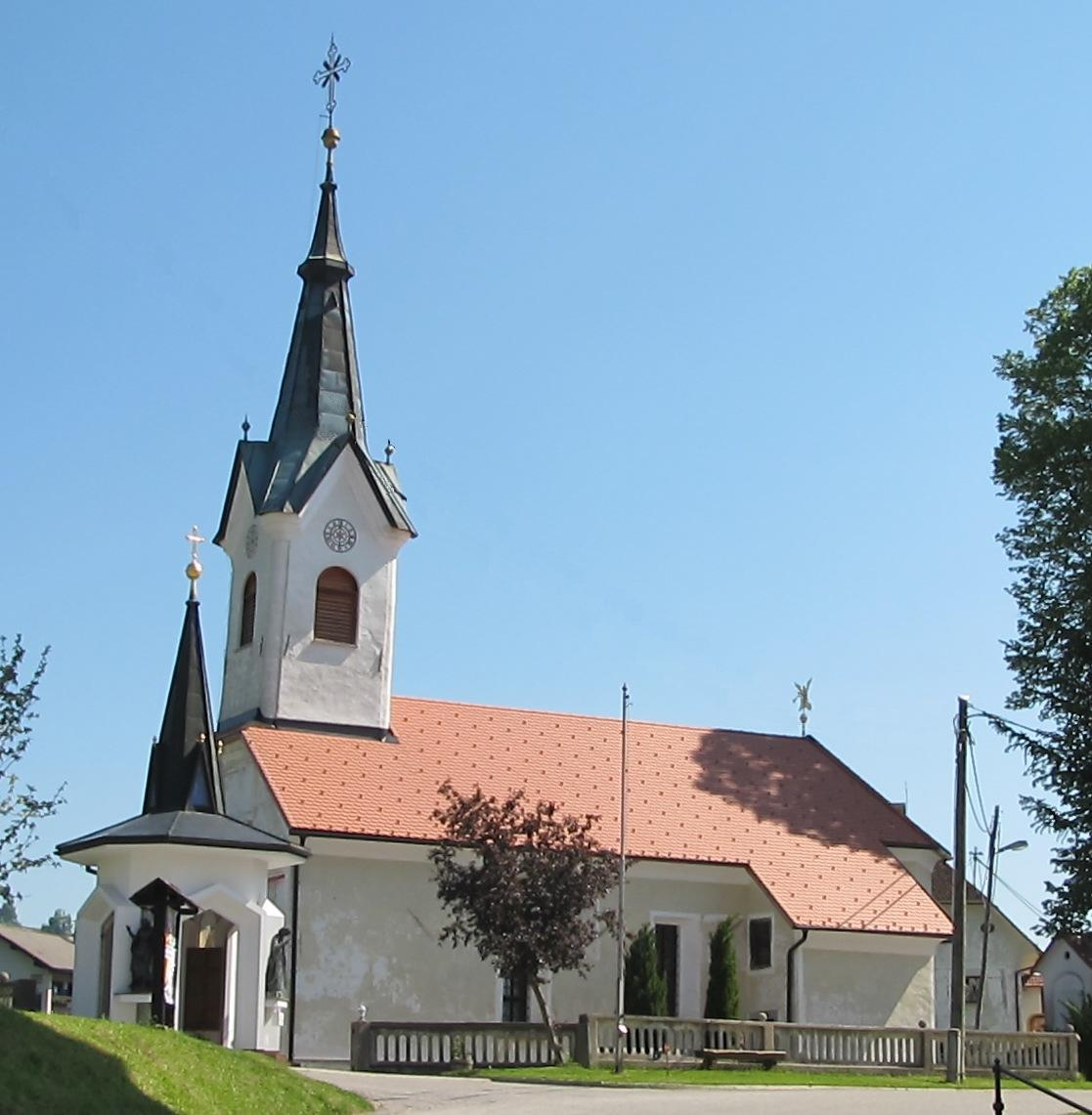
St. Josse's Church

=== Shrines ===
In addition to the shrine at the cemetery dedicated to the non-communist dead of the Second World War, there are six wayside shrines in Šentjošt nad Horjulom registered as cultural heritage.

- The open chapel-shrine dedicated to the Virgin Mary dates from the beginning of the 20th century. It has four columns and contains a statue of the Virgin Mary. The exterior is painted. It stands in front of house no. 49 in the hamlet of Kurja Vas.
- The shrine at the Benedet Farm (Slovene: Kapelica pri Bendetovih) stands west of the settlement near house no. 31. It is an open chapel-shrine dedicated to Our Lady of Peace. It was built after the Second World War.
- The open chapel-shrine dedicated to the Sacred Heart was built after the First World War. It stands in the center of the village at the east end of the cemetery.
- An open chapel-shrine dedicated to Saint John the Evangelist stands north of the village. It contains a wooden statue of the saint and was formerly a station used during processions.
- There is an open chapel-shrine dedicated to Saint Joseph in the northwest part of the settlement. It stands above the main road at the Pišek farm, at Šentjošt nad Horjulom no. 43. It was built after the Second World War.
- Another open chapel-shrine dedicated to Saint Joseph stands in the southern part of the settlement. It was built after the First World War and contains a statue of Saint Joseph. It has a semicircular arch accentuated with a stone.
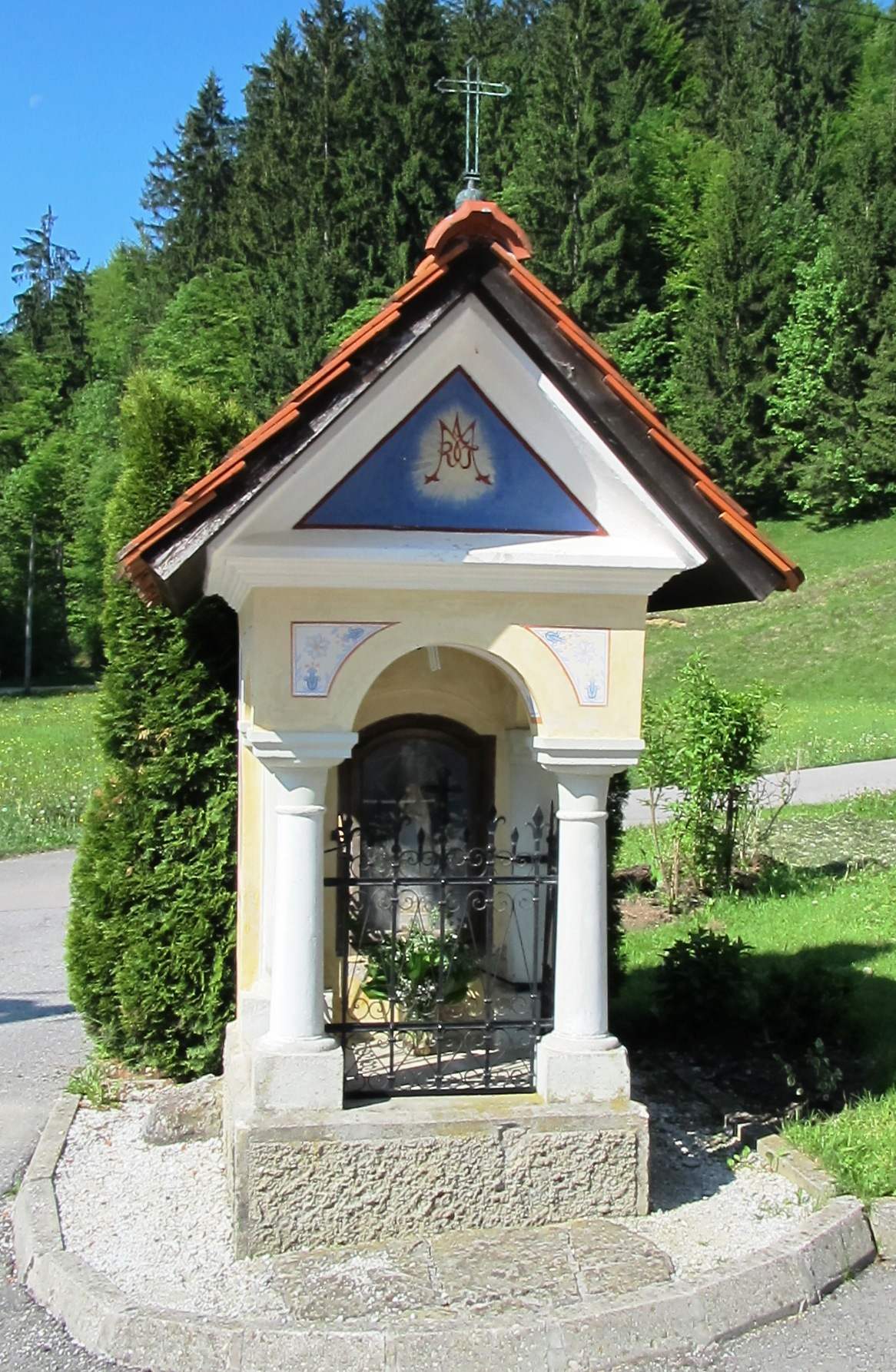
Shrine to the Virgin Mary in the hamlet of Kurja Vas

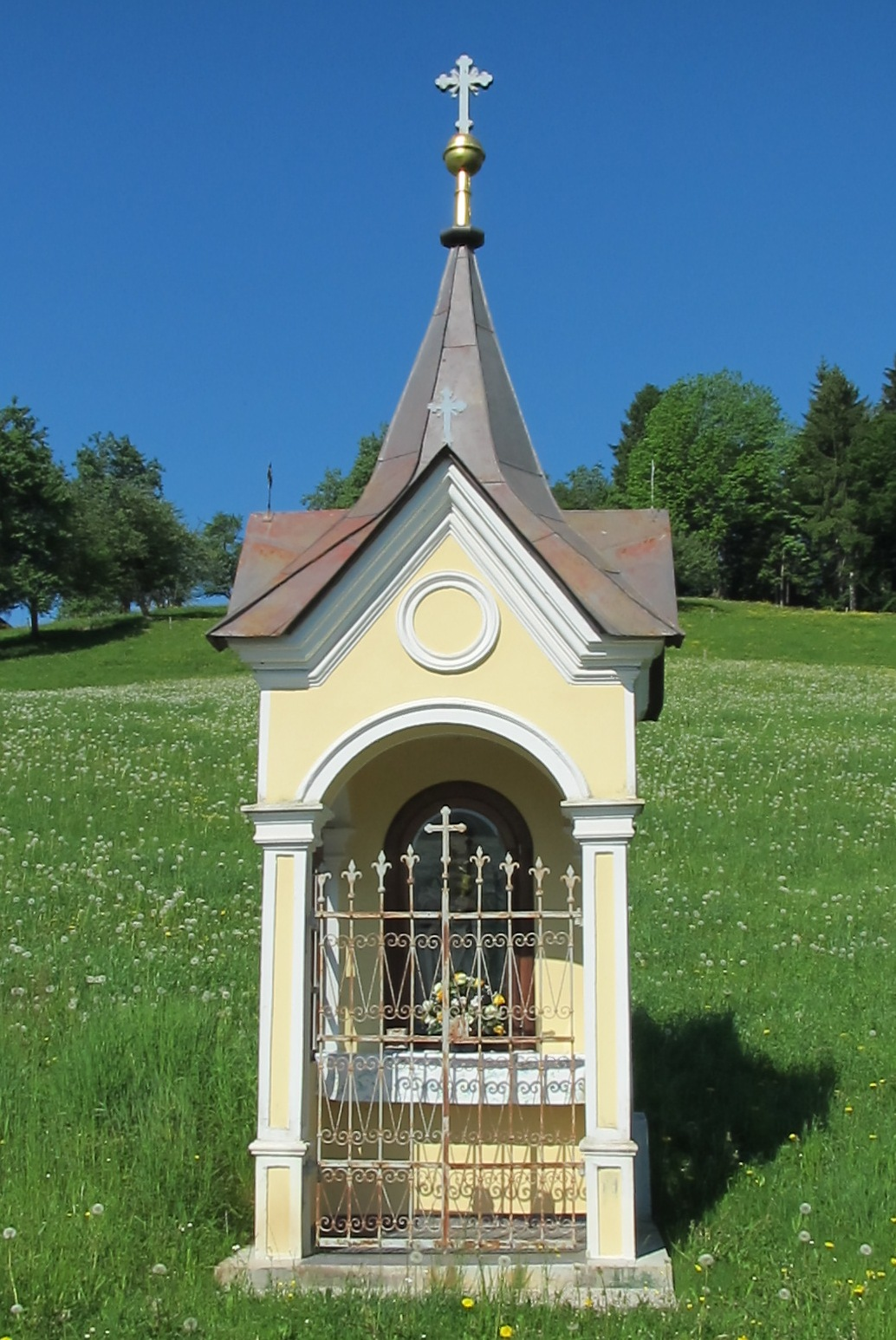
Shrine below Šentjošt nad Horjulom

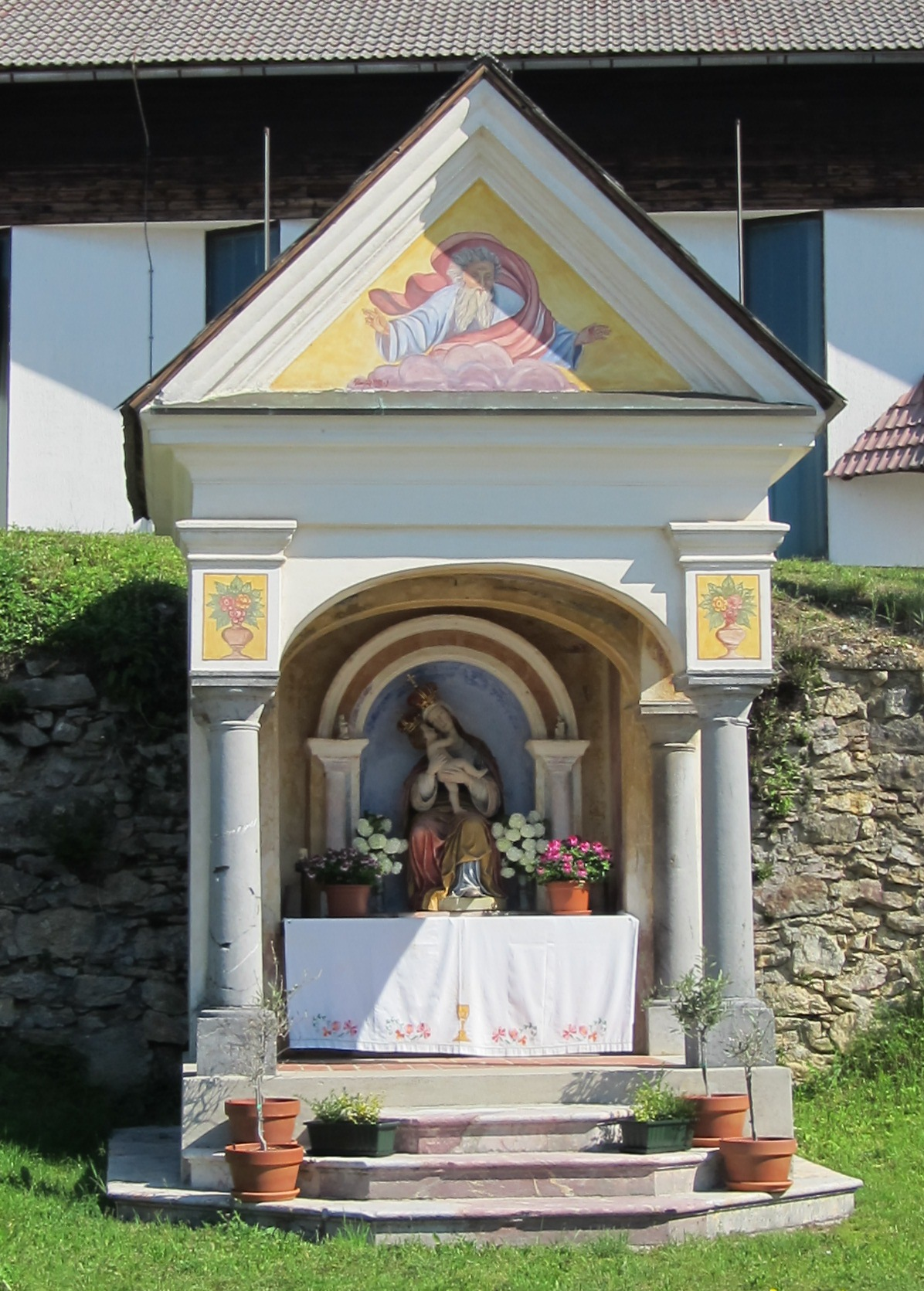
Shrine in Šentjošt nad Horjulom

== Notable people ==
Notable people that were born or lived in Šentjošt nad Horjulom include:

- Josip Samotorčan (1862–1897), writer of literature for young people

== Gallery ==
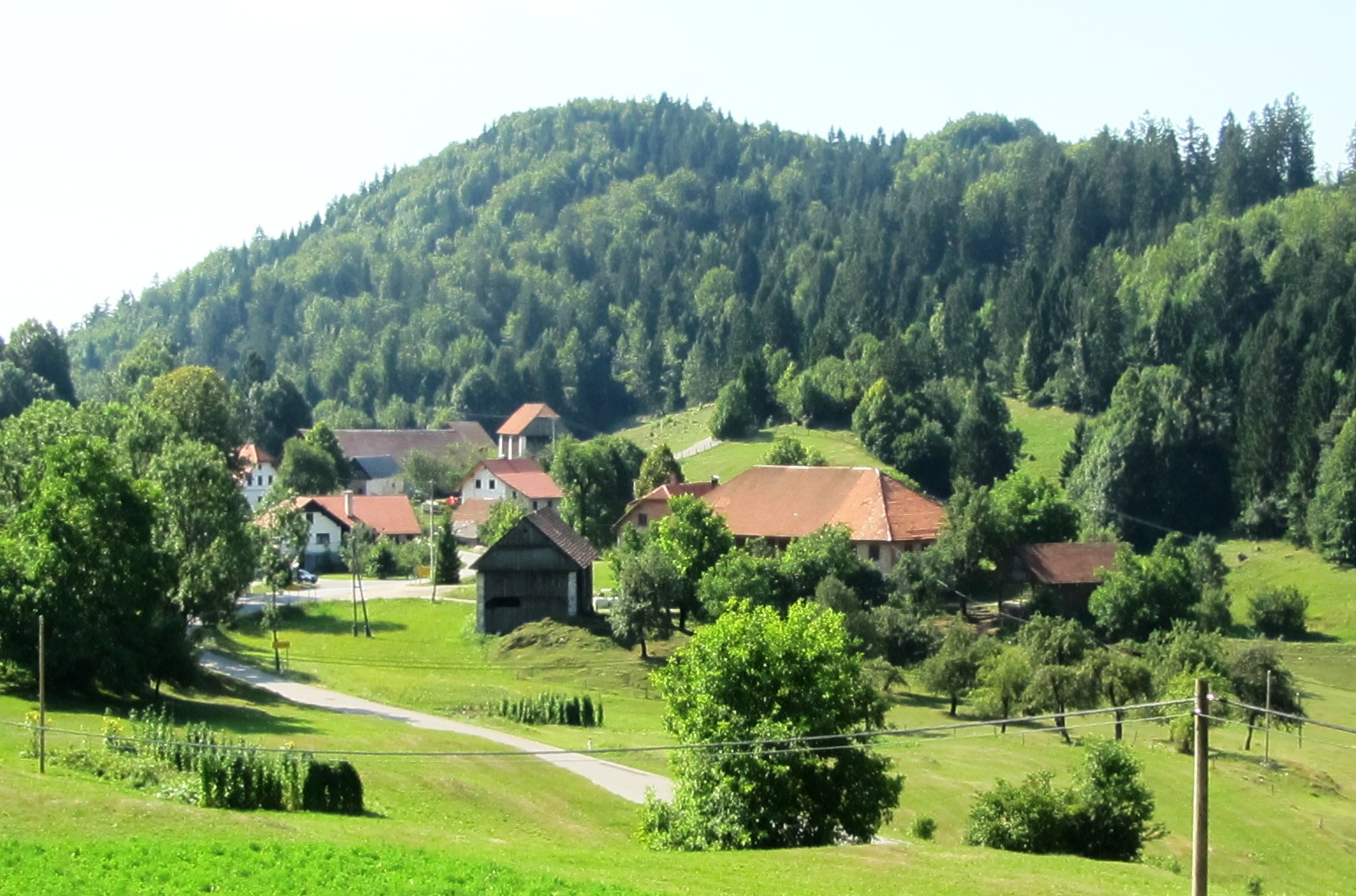
The hamlet of Kurja Vas

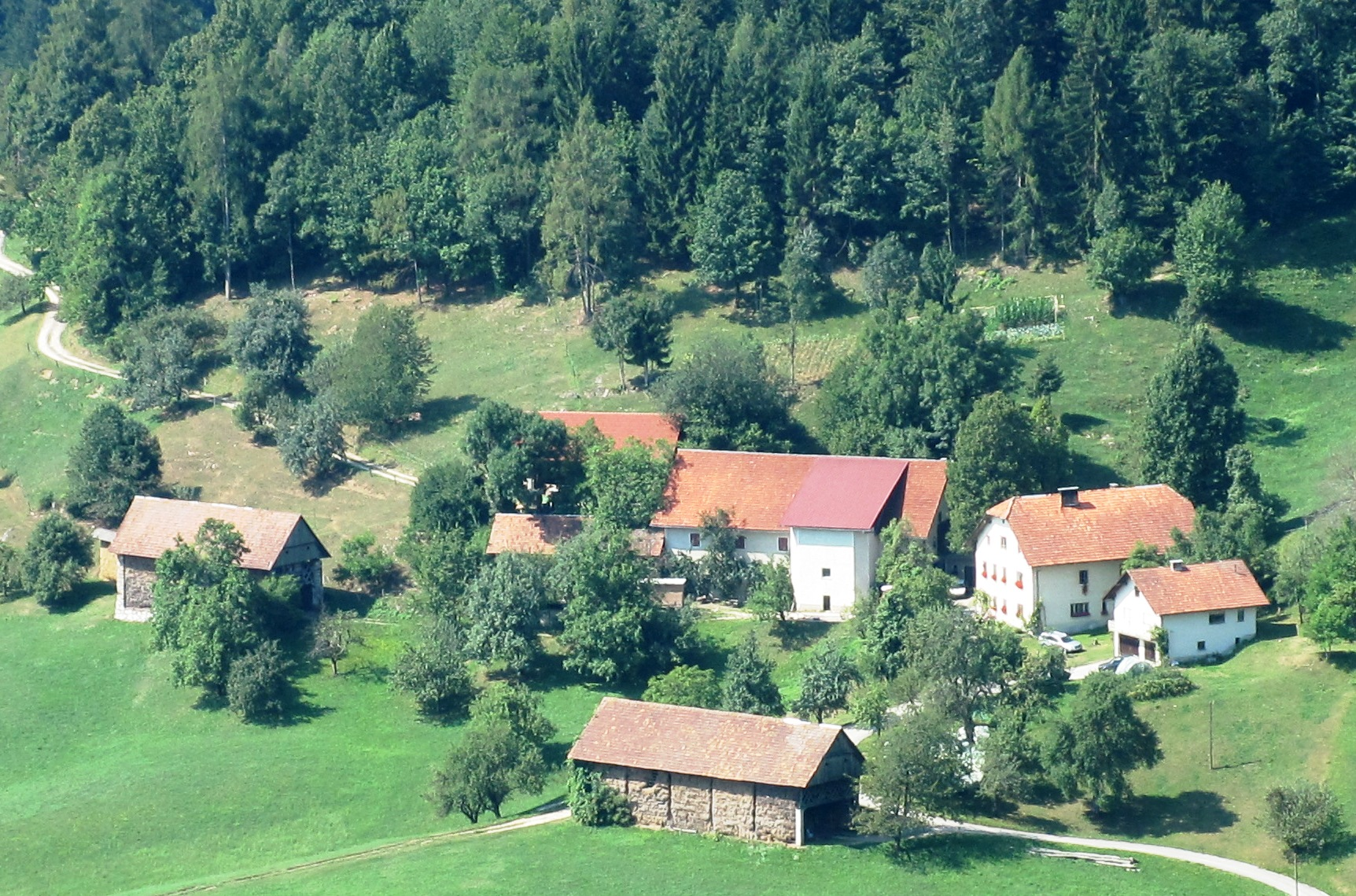
The hamlet of Paradiže

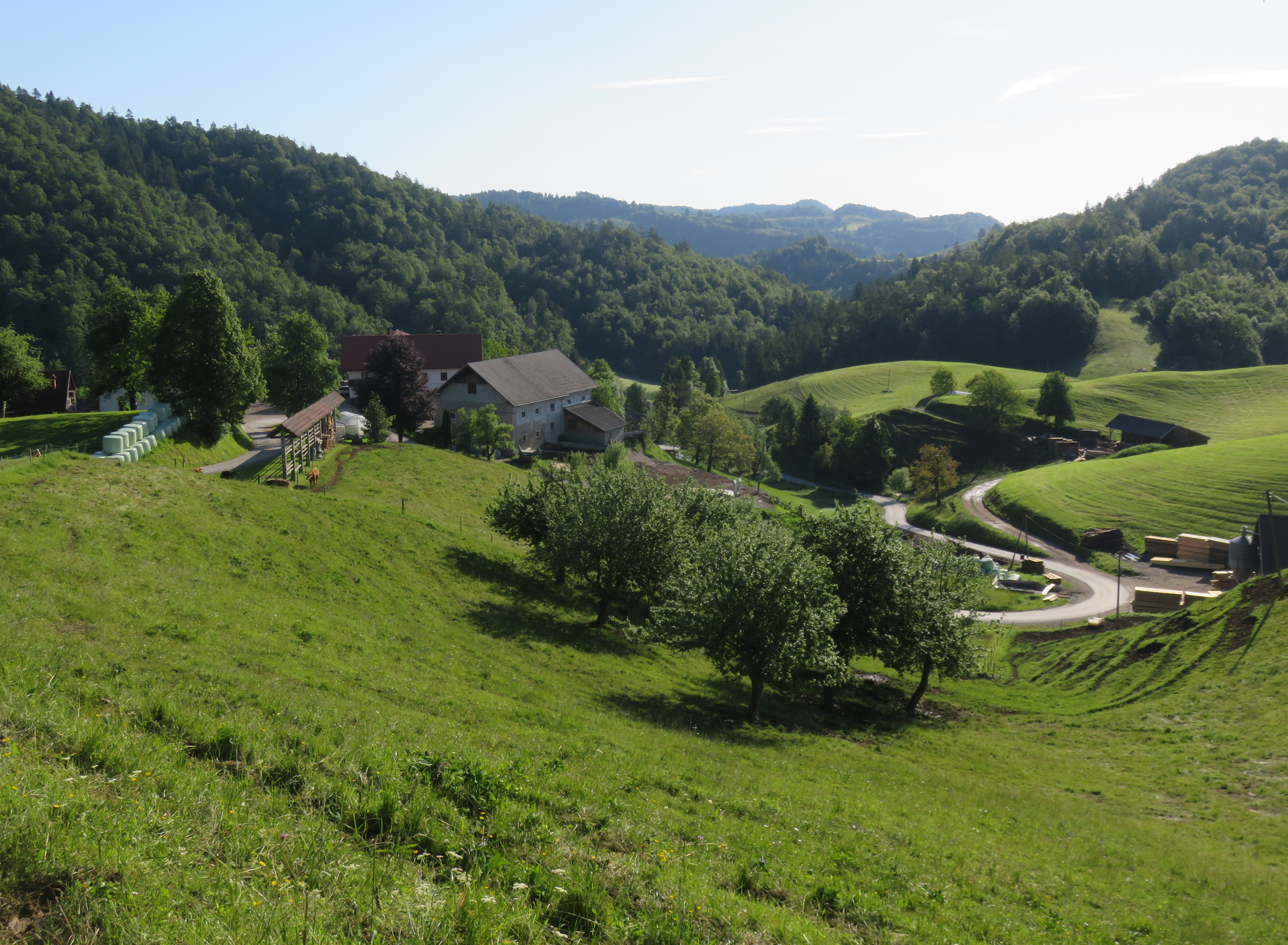
The hamlet of Potok
