= Zgornja Ročica =

- Location in Slovenia
- Coordinates: 46°38′6.36″N 15°50′54.46″E
- Country: Slovenia
- Traditional region: Styria
- Statistical region: Drava
- Municipality: Sveta Ana

Area
  - Total: 1.88 km^{2} (0.73 sq mi)
- Elevation: 299.4 m (982 ft)

Population (2002)
  - Total: 65

Zgornja Ročica (pronounced [ˈzɡoːɾnja ɾɔˈtʃiːtsa]) is a settlement in the Municipality of Sveta Ana in the Slovene Hills in northeastern Slovenia.

There is a small chapel in the settlement. It was built at the beginning of the 20th century in a Neo-Gothic style.
