= Setnik =

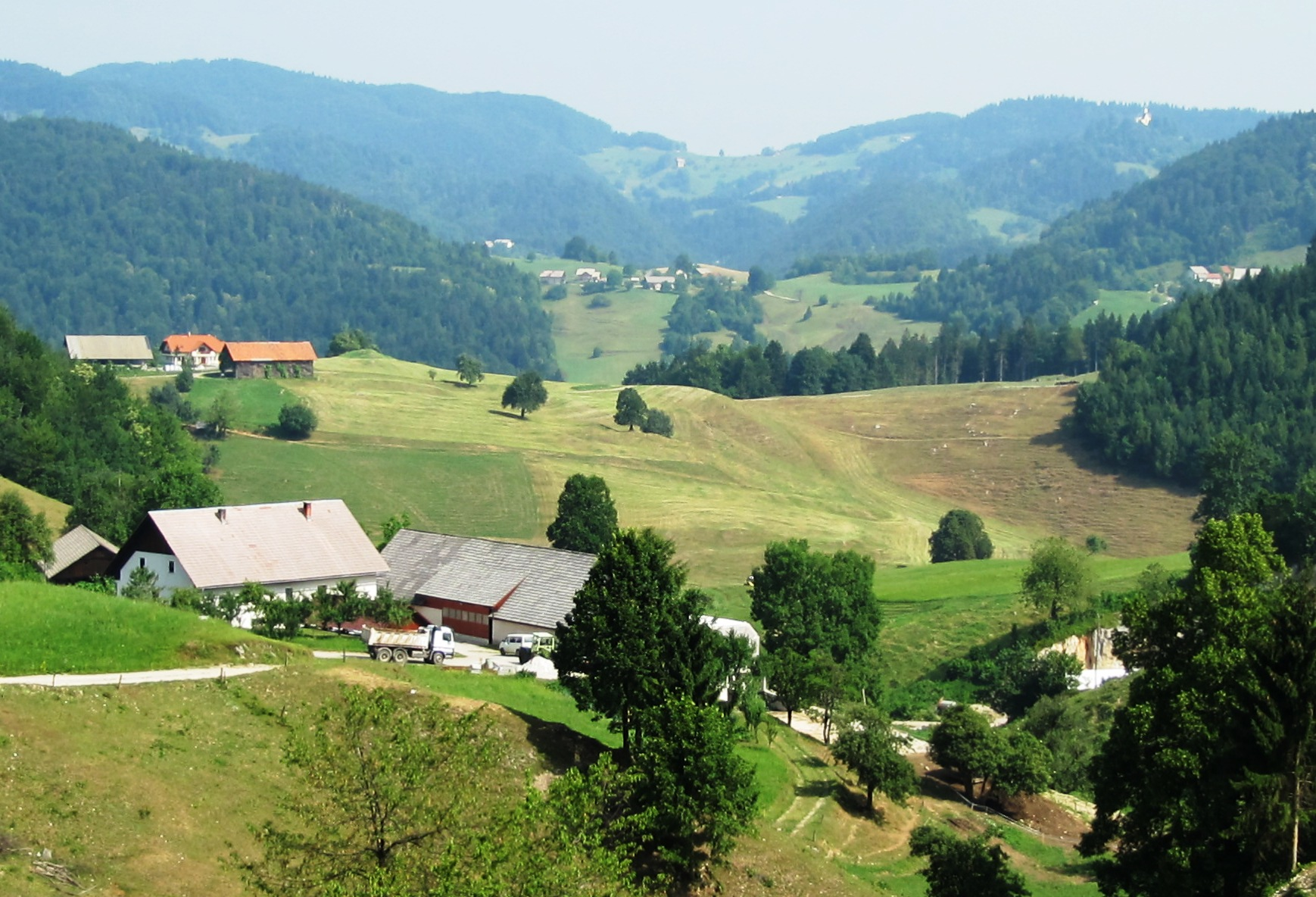

- Location in Slovenia
- Coordinates: 46°3′2.8″N 14°17′11.08″E
- Country: Slovenia
- Traditional region: Upper Carniola
- Statistical region: Central Slovenia
- Municipality: Dobrova–Polhov Gradec

Area
  - Total: 8.1 km^{2} (3.1 sq mi)
- Elevation: 556.8 m (1,827 ft)

Population (2020)
  - Total: 170
  - Density: 21/km^{2} (54/sq mi)

Setnik (pronounced [ˈseːtnik]) is a dispersed settlement east of Polhov Gradec in the Municipality of Dobrova–Polhov Gradec in the Upper Carniola region of Slovenia. It includes the hamlets of Zalog, Butajnova, Veliki Vrh (Slovene: Veliki vrh), and Mali Vrh (Slovene: Mali vrh). Setnik is known as Setjək in the local dialect.

== History ==
During the Second World War the border between Italy and Germany ran north of the hamlet of Zalog along Big Božna Creek. Many of the farm buildings in Setnik were burned during the war. In 1953 the northeastern part of neighboring Butajnova, also known as Pusti Vrh, was assigned to Setnik.

== Church ==
The local church is dedicated to Saint Martin. It was first mentioned in documents dating to 1526. A few remnants of 16th-century frescos survive on the exterior wall. The main altar is from the early 19th century and the side altar dates from 1841. The church stands in the eastern part of the settlement, on an elevation south of Praproče.

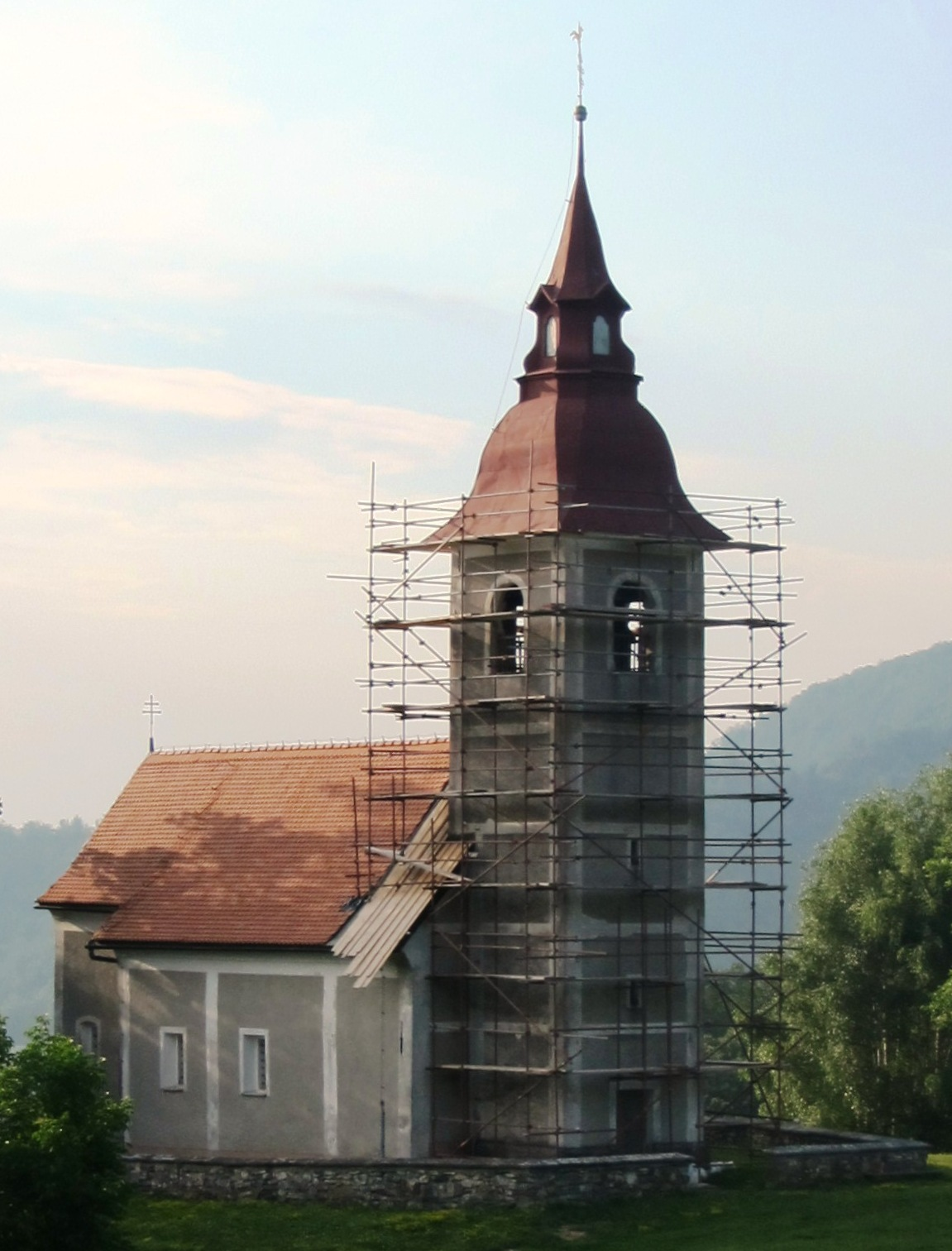
Saint Martin's Church

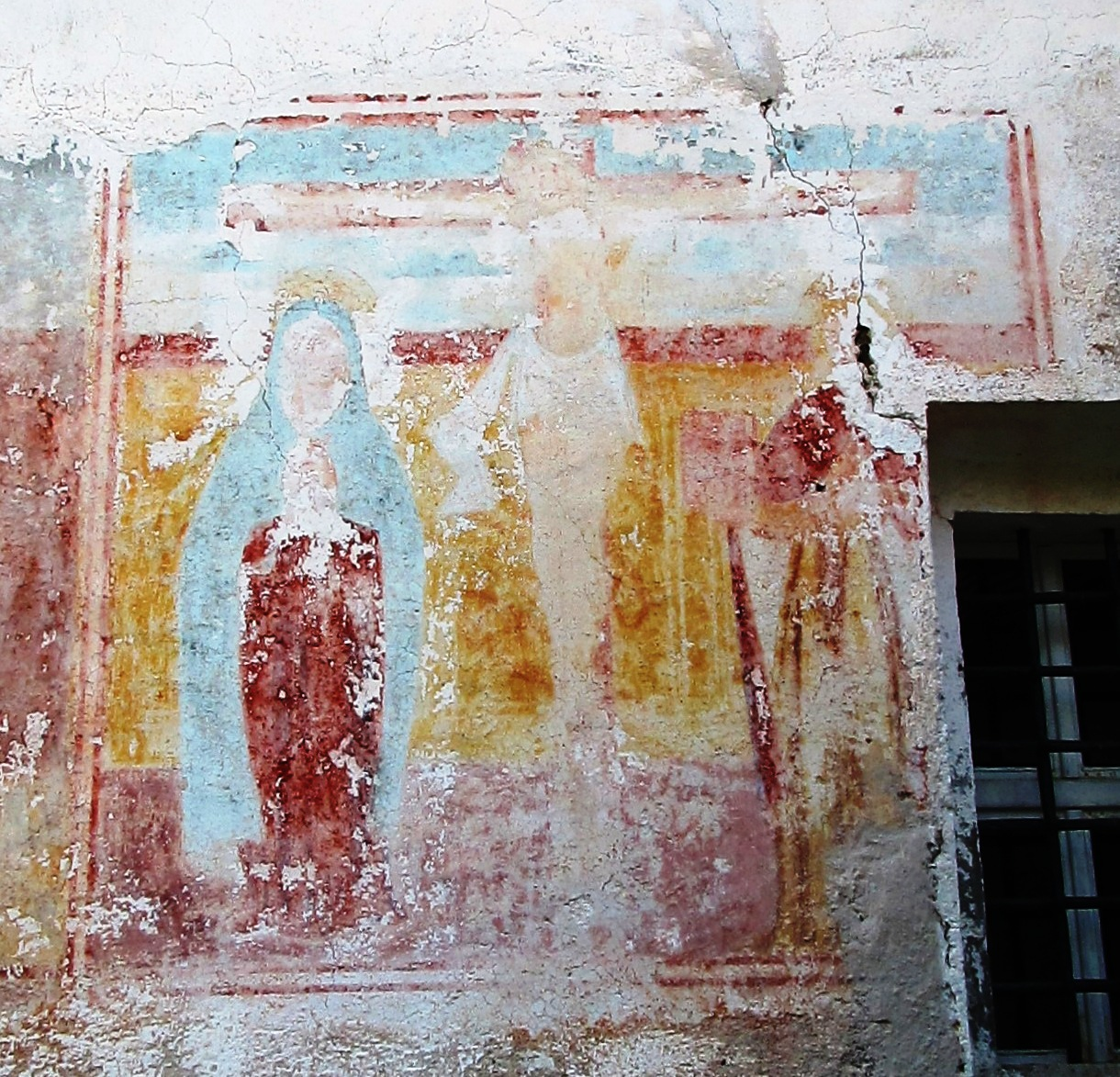
16th-century exterior fresco, south wall

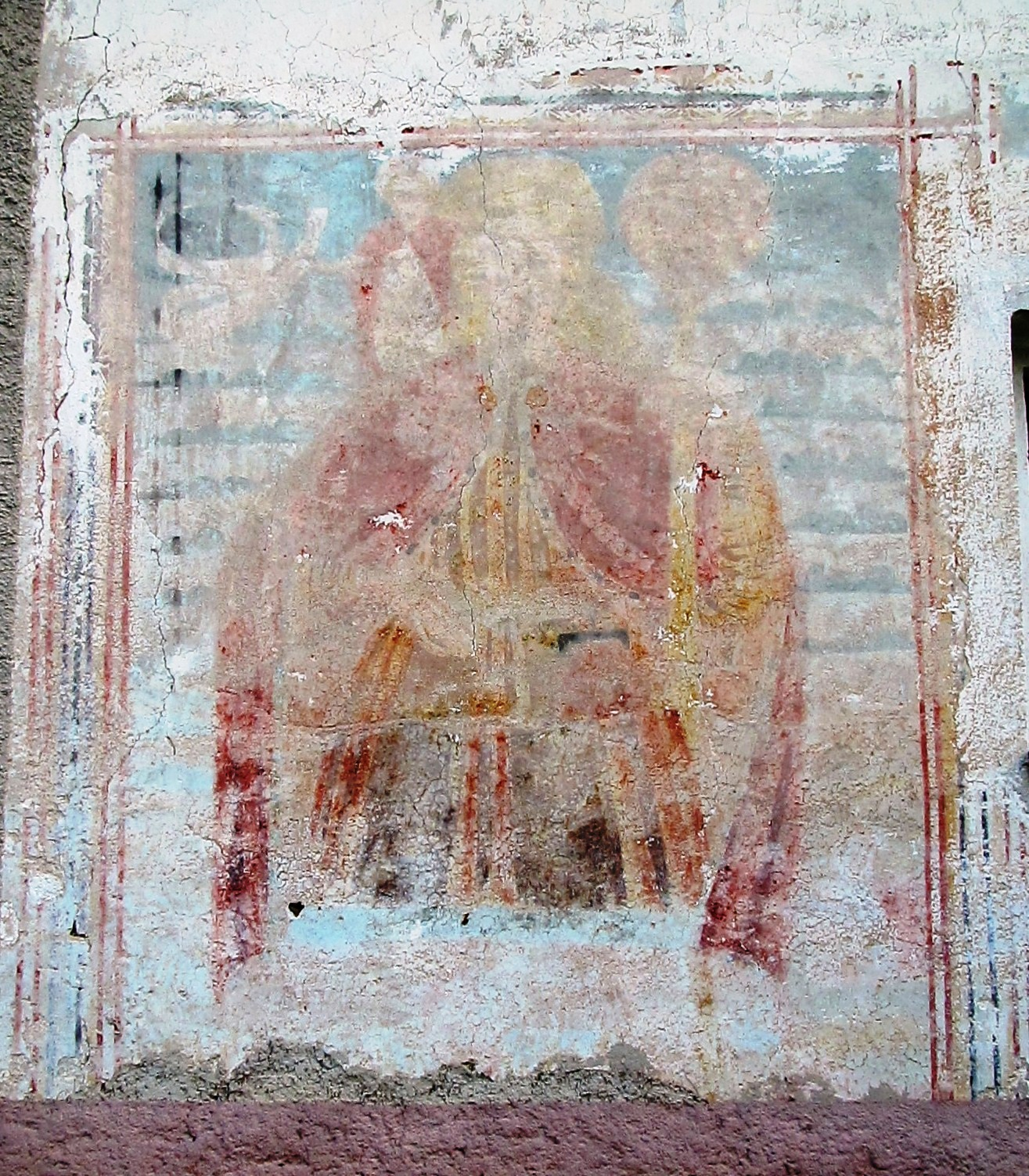
16th-century exterior fresco, south wall

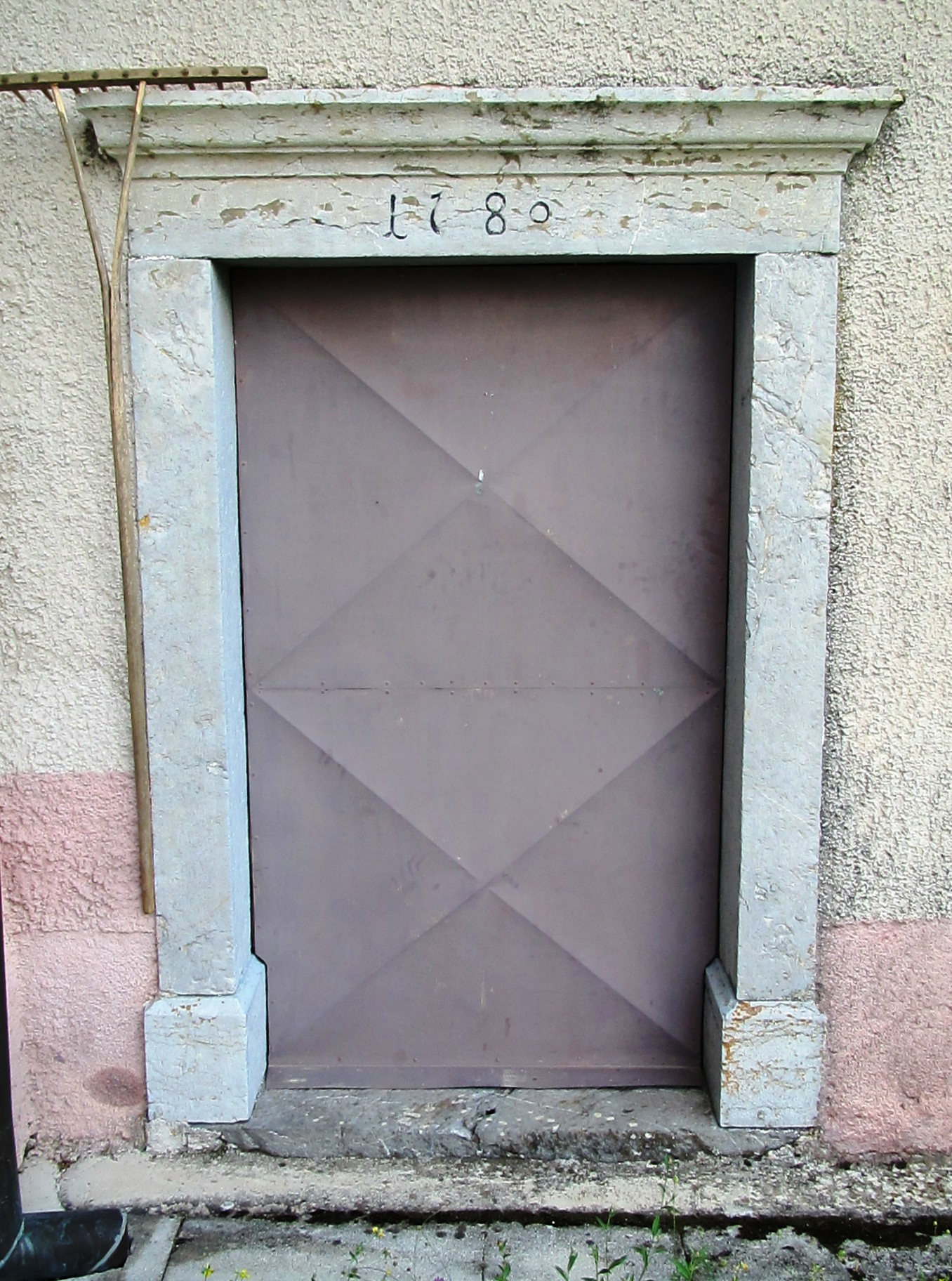
Sacristy door of the church, dated 1780

== Other cultural heritage ==
In addition to Saint Martin's Church, several other structures in Setnik are registered as cultural heritage:

- The farm at Setnik no. 19 (known as the Sušnik farm) stands alone in the western part of the settlement. It has a large single-story house with the year 1856 carved into the black stone door casing, a carved double door, small windows with shutters and metal latticework, and a barn.
- The farm at Setnik no. 29 stands north of the road in the valley of Little Creek (Slovene: Mala voda). It has a two-story rectangular house with the year 1844 carved into the stone door casing, small windows on the upper floor, and a symmetrical gabled roof. The barn is a newer building.
- The farm at Setnik no. 30 (known as the Setnikar farm) stands alone north of the Saint Martin's Church. It has a single-story house with small windows and the year 1849 carved into the stone door casing. There is a large stone barn with brick windows, a shed, a woodshed, and an orchard.
- The mill and sawmill at Setnik no. 5 is in the northern part of the settlement, along the road from Polhov Gradec. The buildings include a two-story house with the year 1857 carved into the stone door casing and a mill in the lower part, and a building for a sawmill. The mill has two stones and is turbine-driven; the stamp mill is in ruins. The abandoned sawmill has a fully preserved Francis turbine–driven Venice frame saw.
- The Vrbanc cottage (Slovene: Vrbancova bajta) at Setnik no. 6 stands in the northern part of the settlement along the road from Polhov Gradec. It is a wooden cottager's dwelling with a stone semi-cellar. The cottage has been remodeled but many architectural elements from the second half of the 19th century are preserved.

== Gallery ==
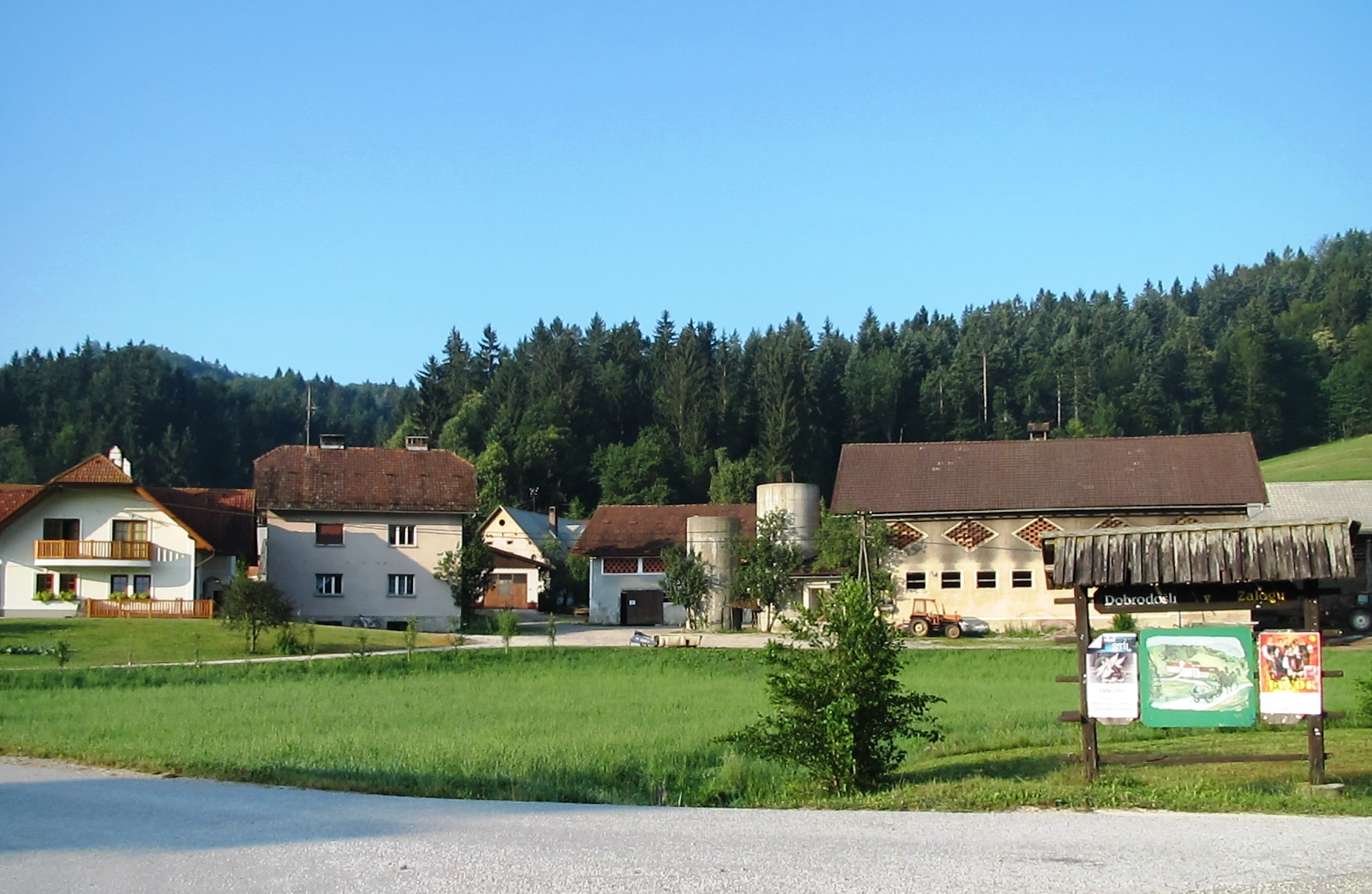
The hamlet of Zalog in the valley of Big Božna Creek

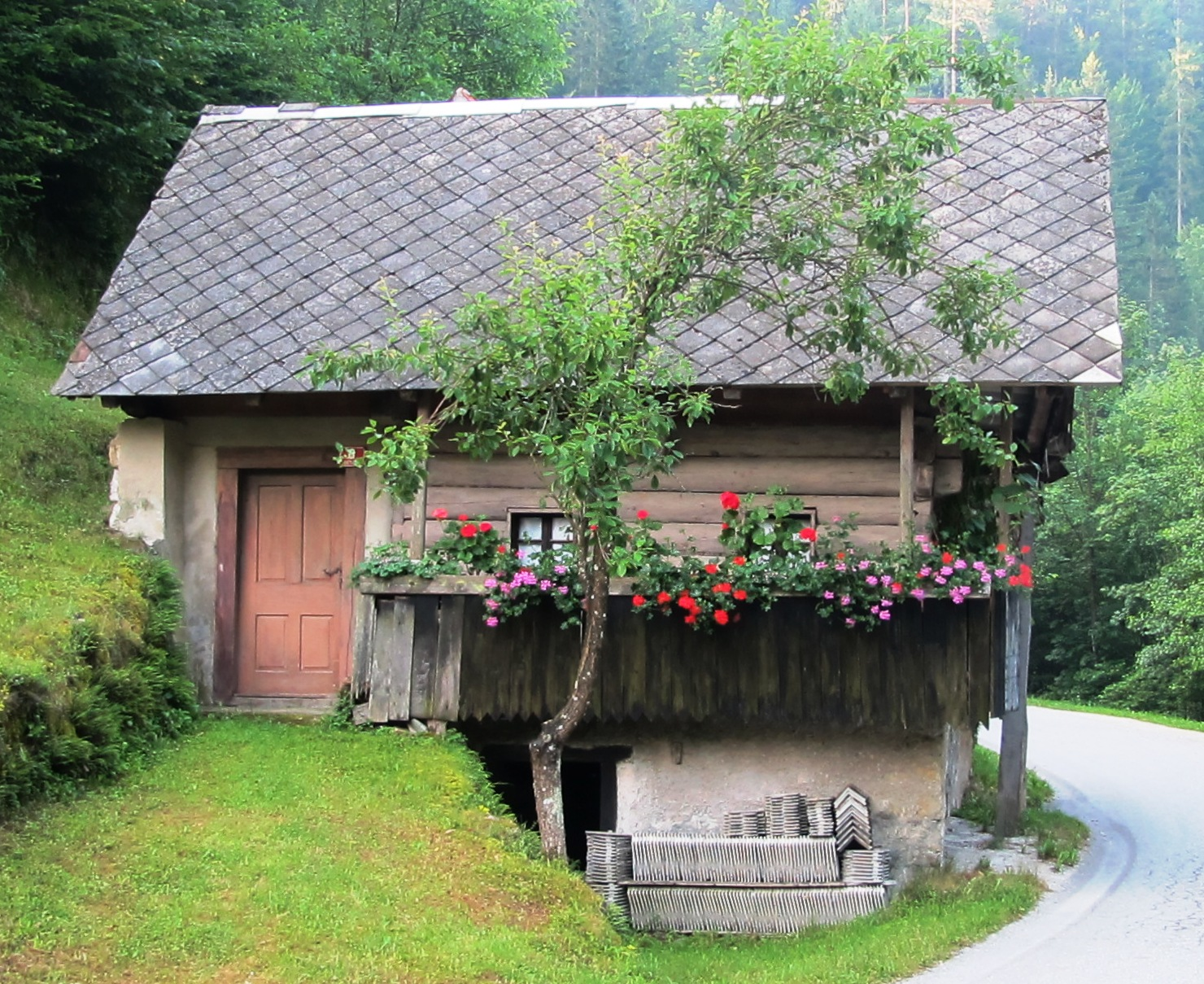
The Vrbanc cottage

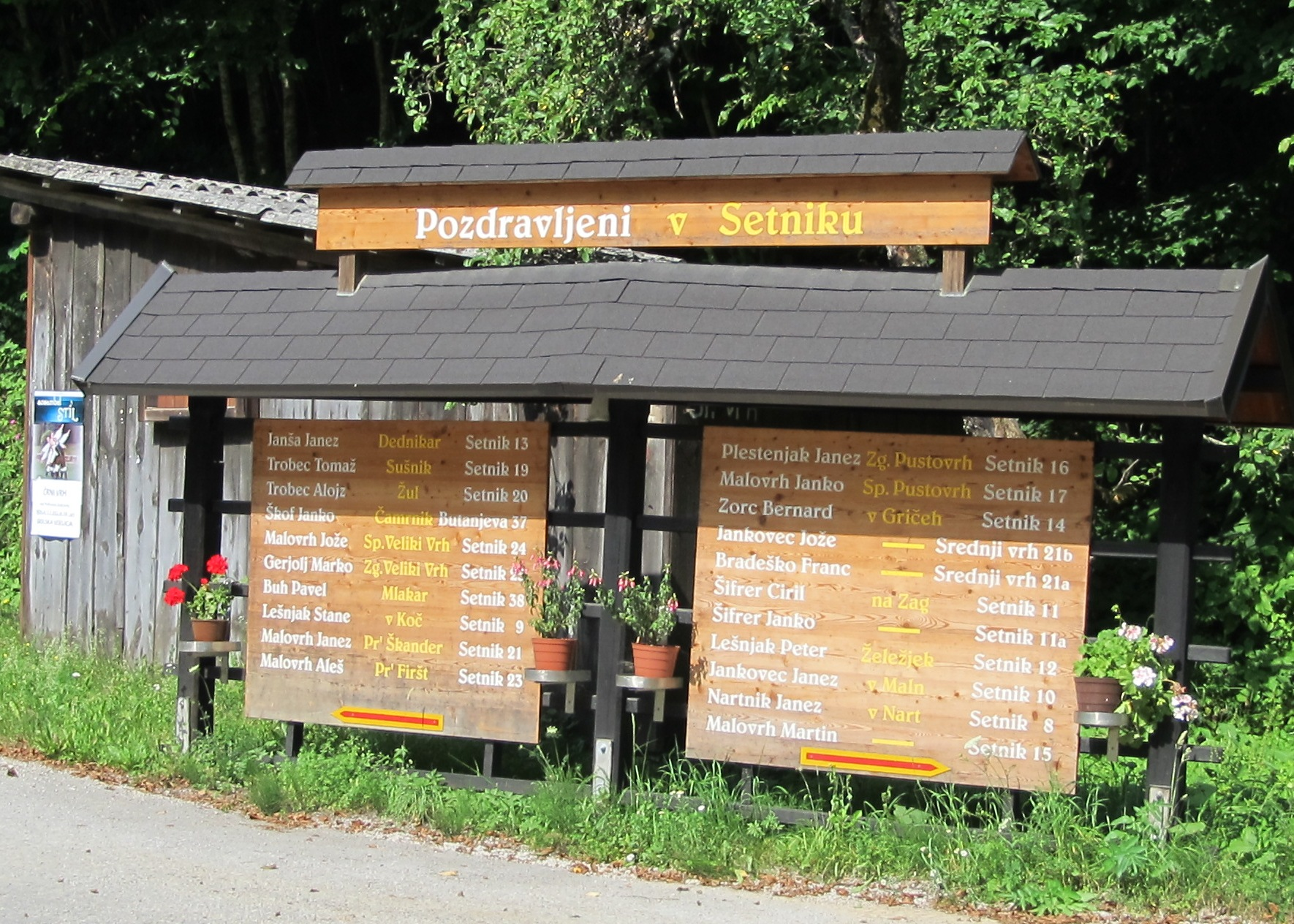
Sign in Setnik with surnames, traditional farm names, and addresses
