= Kremberk =

- Location in Slovenia
- Coordinates: 46°38′44.54″N 15°50′15.55″E
- Country: Slovenia
- Traditional region: Styria
- Statistical region: Drava
- Municipality: Sveta Ana

Area
  - Total: 2.34 km^{2} (0.90 sq mi)
- Elevation: 310.1 m (1,017 ft)

Population (2002)
  - Total: 238

Kremberk (pronounced [ˈkɾeːmbɛɾk]) is a settlement in the Slovene Hills in the Municipality of Sveta Ana in northeastern Slovenia.
