= Municipality of Sveta Ana =

Municipality of Slovenia

Municipality of Sveta Ana Občina Sveta Ana
- Municipality
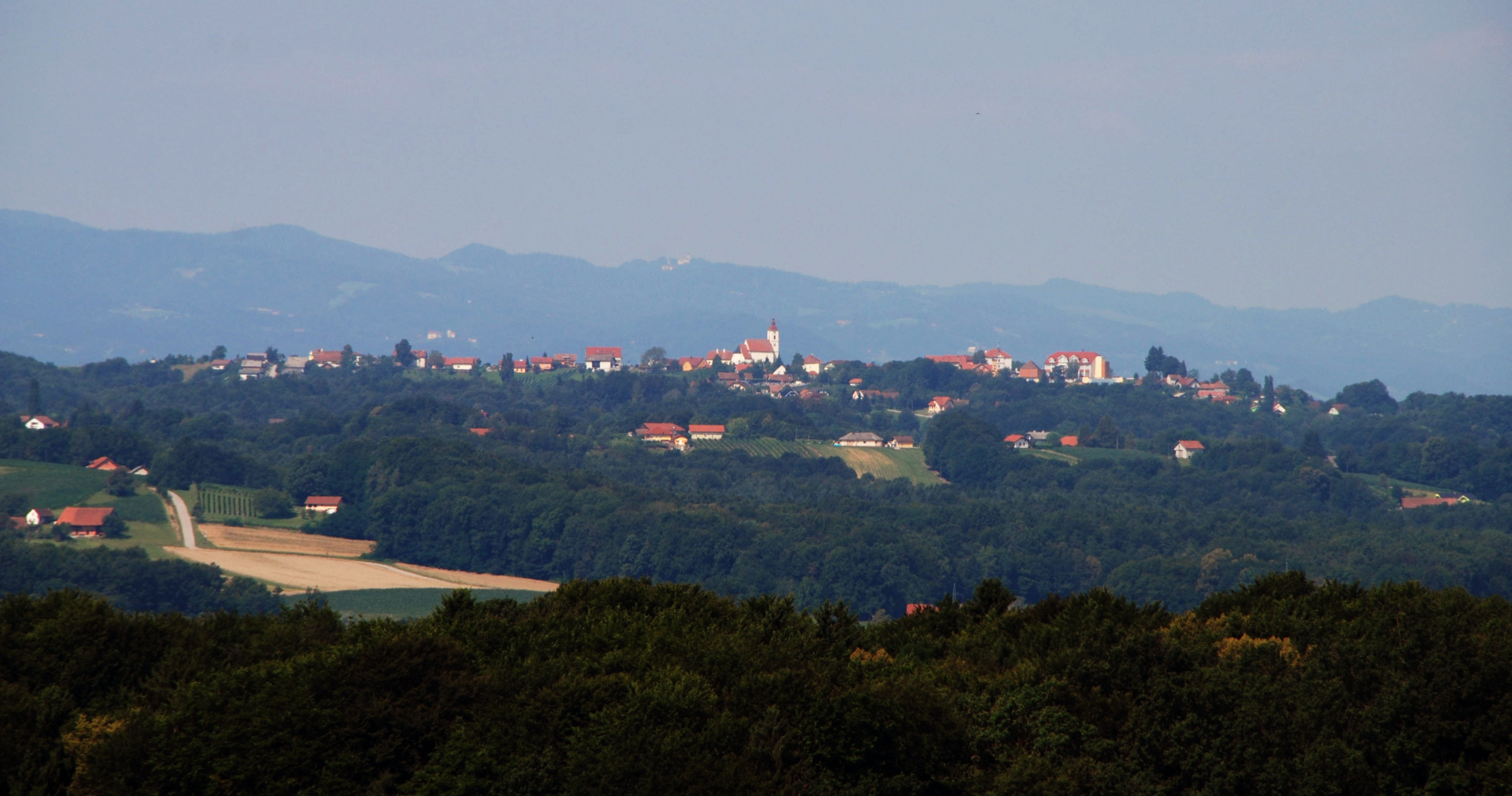

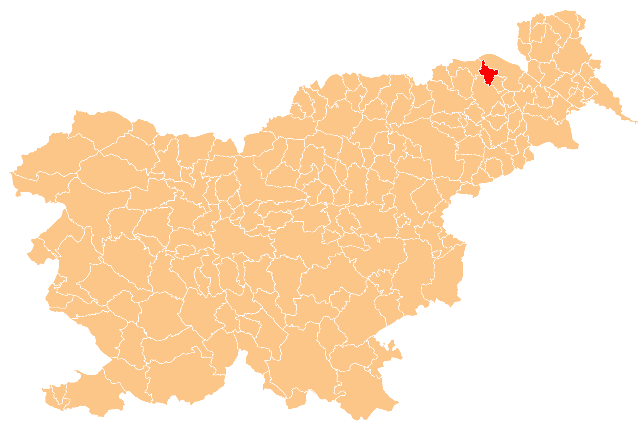
- Location of the Municipality of Sveta Ana in Slovenia
- Coordinates: 46°38′59″N 15°50′43″E
- Country: Slovenia

Government
  - Mayor: Martin Breznik

Area
  - Total: 37.2 km^{2} (14.4 sq mi)

Population (2019)
  - Total: 2,285
  - Density: 61.4/km^{2} (159/sq mi)
- Time zone: UTC+01 (CET)
  - Summer (DST): UTC+02 (CEST)
- Website: www.sv-ana.si

The Municipality of Sveta Ana (pronounced [ˈsʋeːta ˈaːna]; Slovene: Občina Sveta Ana) is a municipality in northeastern Slovenia. It has just over 2,000 inhabitants. It is located in the Slovene Hills (Slovene: Slovenske gorice). The area is part of the traditional region of Styria. It is now included in the Drava Statistical Region. The seat of the municipality is Sveta Ana v Slovenskih Goricah.

== Settlements ==
In addition to the municipal seat of Sveta Ana v Slovenskih Goricah, the municipality also includes the following settlements:

- Dražen Vrh
- Froleh
- Kremberk
- Krivi Vrh
- Ledinek
- Lokavec
- Rožengrunt
- Zgornja Bačkova
- Zgornja Ročica
- Zgornja Ščavnica
- Žice
