= Rihard Blagaj =

Slovenian botanist (1786–1858)

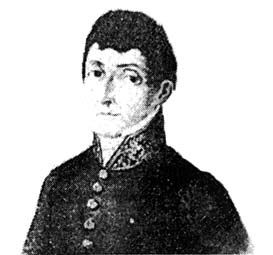
- Born: 17 August 1786
- Died: 14 March 1858 (aged 71)
- Citizenship: Holy Roman Empire; Austrian Empire
- Occupation: Botanist

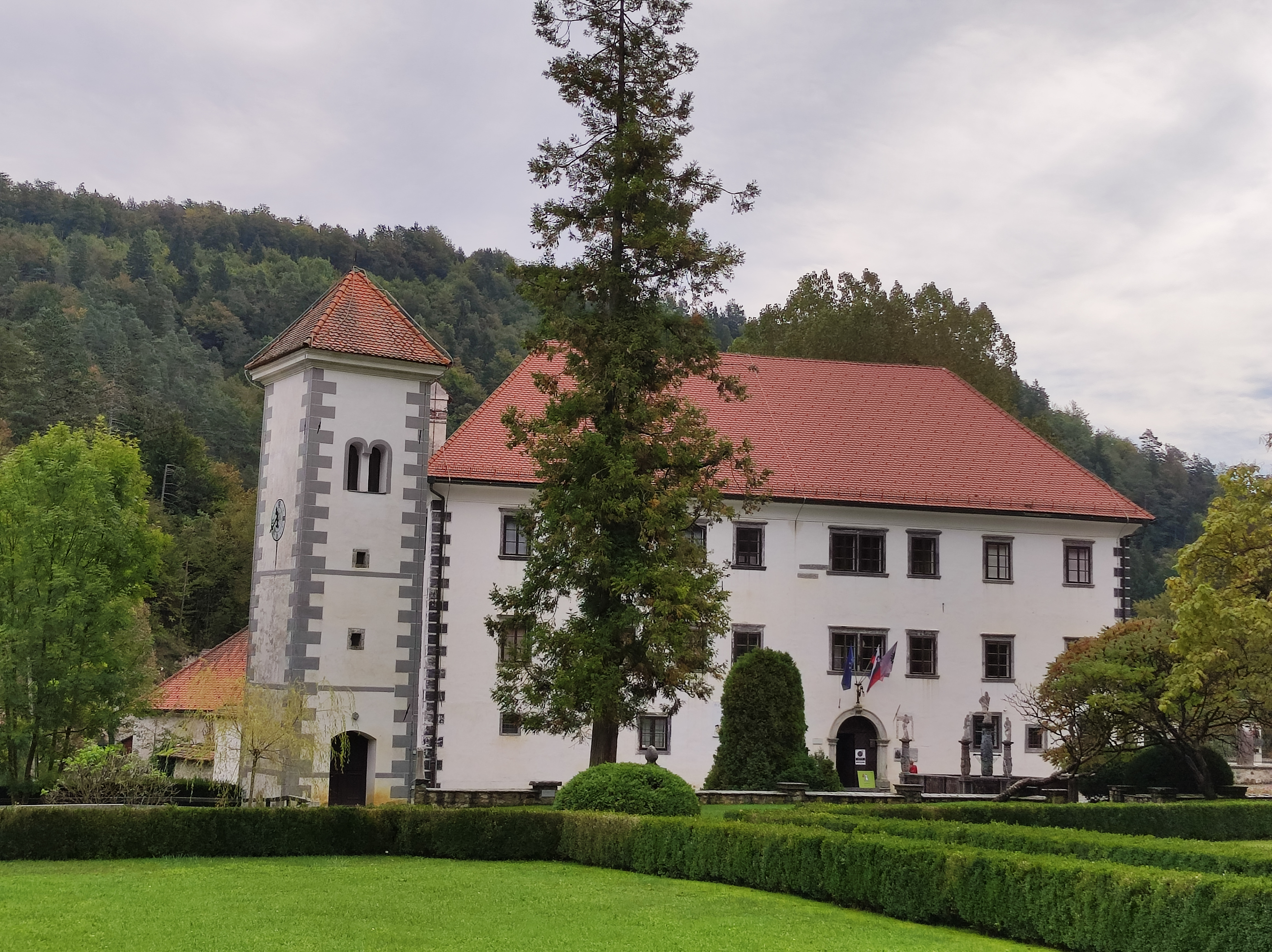
View of the Polhov Gradec Castle, country residence of the Counts Ursini von Blagay

Count Rihard Blagaj also known as Rihard Ursini von Blagay (17 August 1786 – 14 March 1858) was a Slovenian aristocrat, botanist and patron of the arts. He was both first cousin and uncle-in-law of Count Anton Alexander von Auersperg, an Austrian poet and liberal politician from Carniola, better known as Anastasius Grün.

== Early life ==
Rihard Siegfried Alois Franz Salesius Jodok was born on 17 August 1786, into the Blagaj family, an old aristocratic family, collateral branch of the medieval Babonić family, which, at that time, was already integrated into the Austrian nobility. He was the second son of Count Joseph Franz Ursini von Blagay (1759–1831) by his first wife, Countess Maria von Auersperg (1764–1787).

== Biography ==
He organized numerous cultural gatherings of Slovene en-lighteners at his estate, Polhov Gradec Castle, which he acquired through the marriage to the noble Billichgrätz family. At the site of the old castle an octagonal gloriette was later built, which his wife, Countess Antonia turned into a chapel in 1853, adding 14 shrines for the Stations of the Cross to it to create a Calvary. As one of the first Župans of the Ljubljana district, Richard operated in Slovenia. He also collected Slovene plant species for the naturalist Heinrich Freyer.

== Personal life ==
In 1808, Blagaj married his third cousin, Baroness Antonia von Billichgrätz zu Baumkircherthurm und Hilzenegkh (1792–1861), an heiress of Billichgrätz family and Polhov Gradec Castle.

She was the younger daughter of Baron Joseph Anton von Billichgrätz zu Baumkircherthurm und Hilzenegkh (1748–1808) and his wife, Countess Maria Josefa von Gallenberg (1760–1813). The marriage remained childless. He died on 14 March 1858, aged 71. In 1875, the castle was purchased by the Urbančič family, members of local nobility and owners of the nearby Turn Castle. The buyer was Luiza Urbančič (1842–1918), sister-in-law of Josipina Turnograjska, one of the first Slovene female writers, poets, and composers.

== See also ==
- Daphne blagayana
- List of Slovenian botanists
- Polhov Gradec
