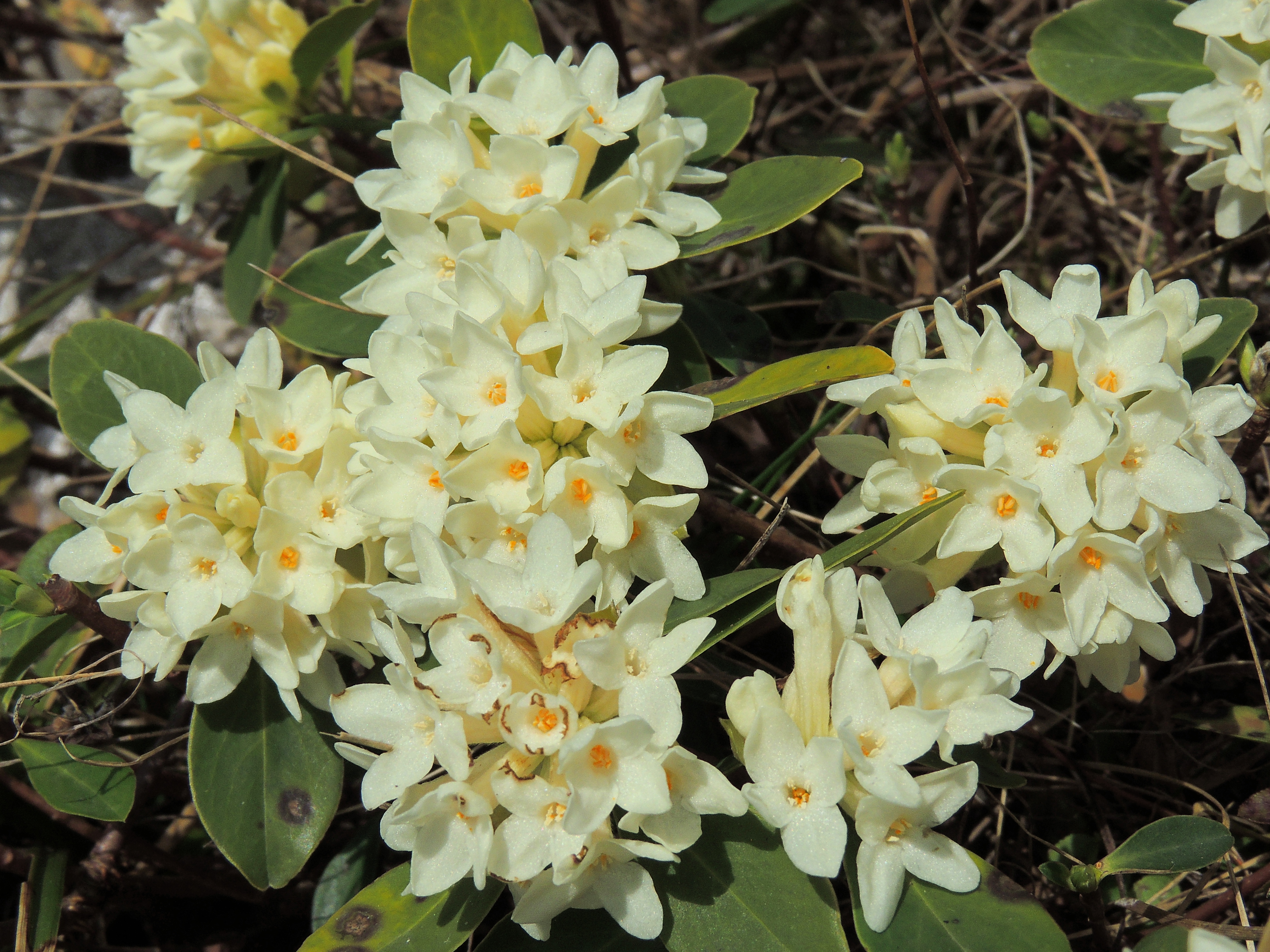

Scientific classification
- Kingdom: Plantae
- Clade: Tracheophytes
- Clade: Angiosperms
- Clade: Eudicots
- Clade: Rosids
- Order: Malvales
- Family: Thymelaeaceae
- Genus: Daphne
- Species: D. blagayana

Binomial name
- Daphne blagayana Freyer

= Daphne blagayana =

Species of shrub

Daphne blagayana is a species of flowering plant in the genus Daphne. It was discovered in 1837 near Polhov Gradec (now northeastern Slovenia) by Heinrich Freyer and named after the botanist Rihard Blagaj.

== Description ==
Growing to 40 cm (16 in), this trailing evergreen shrub bears fragrant white flowers in early spring. The flowers are followed by round pink or white berries.

== Chemical and medicinal properties ==
Plants of this species have been used for medicinal purposes because they are found to have antioxidant properties, useful in treating skin diseases, toothache, and malaria, and may be used as a natural laxative or anticoagulant. Cytokines that are directly involved in the inflammatory response are reduced, allowing this effect to occur.

== See also ==
- Campanula zoysii
- Primula carniolica
