= Polhov Gradec Castle =

Coordinates: 46°3′59.3″N 14°18′43.47″E

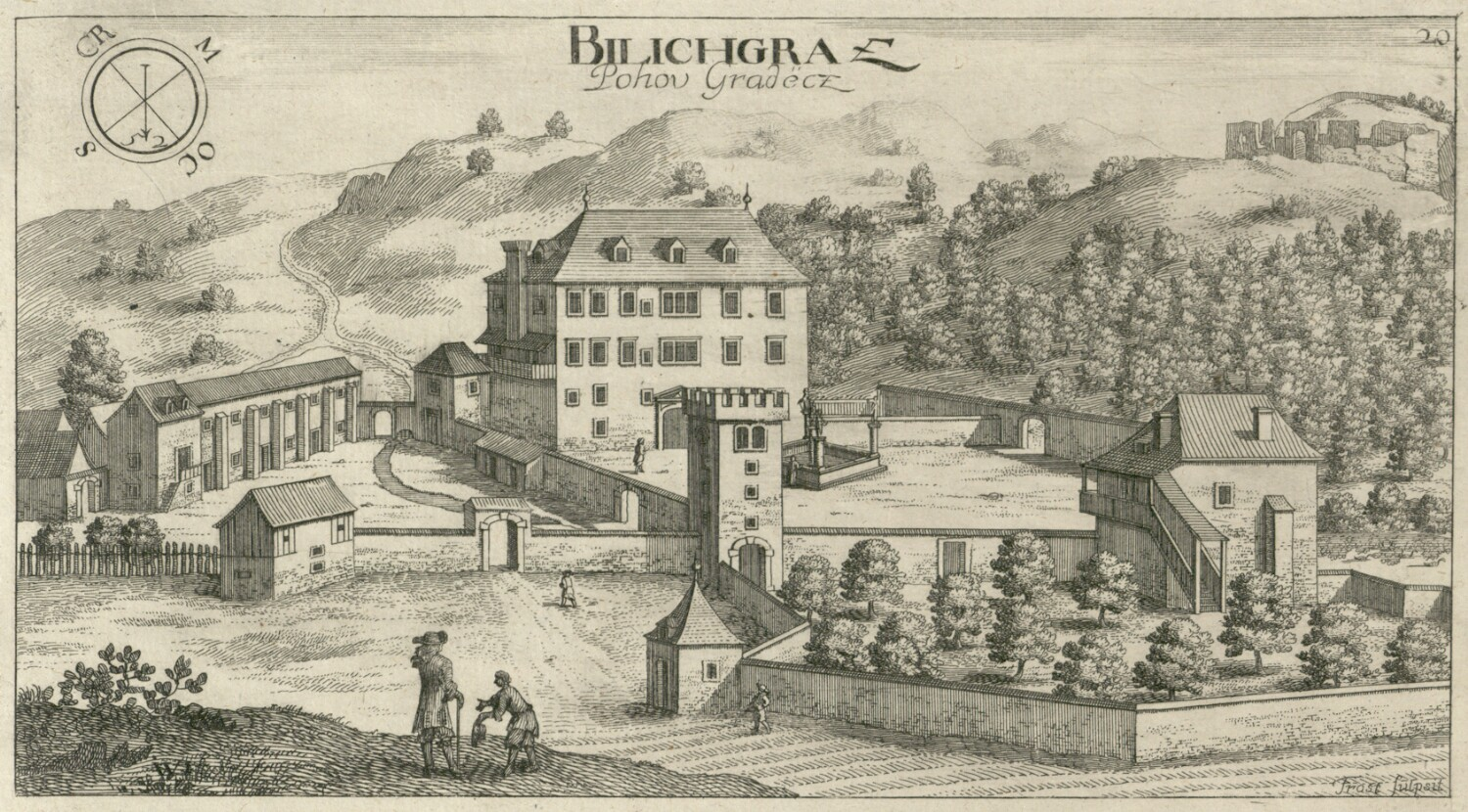
Polhov Gradec Castle in 1679

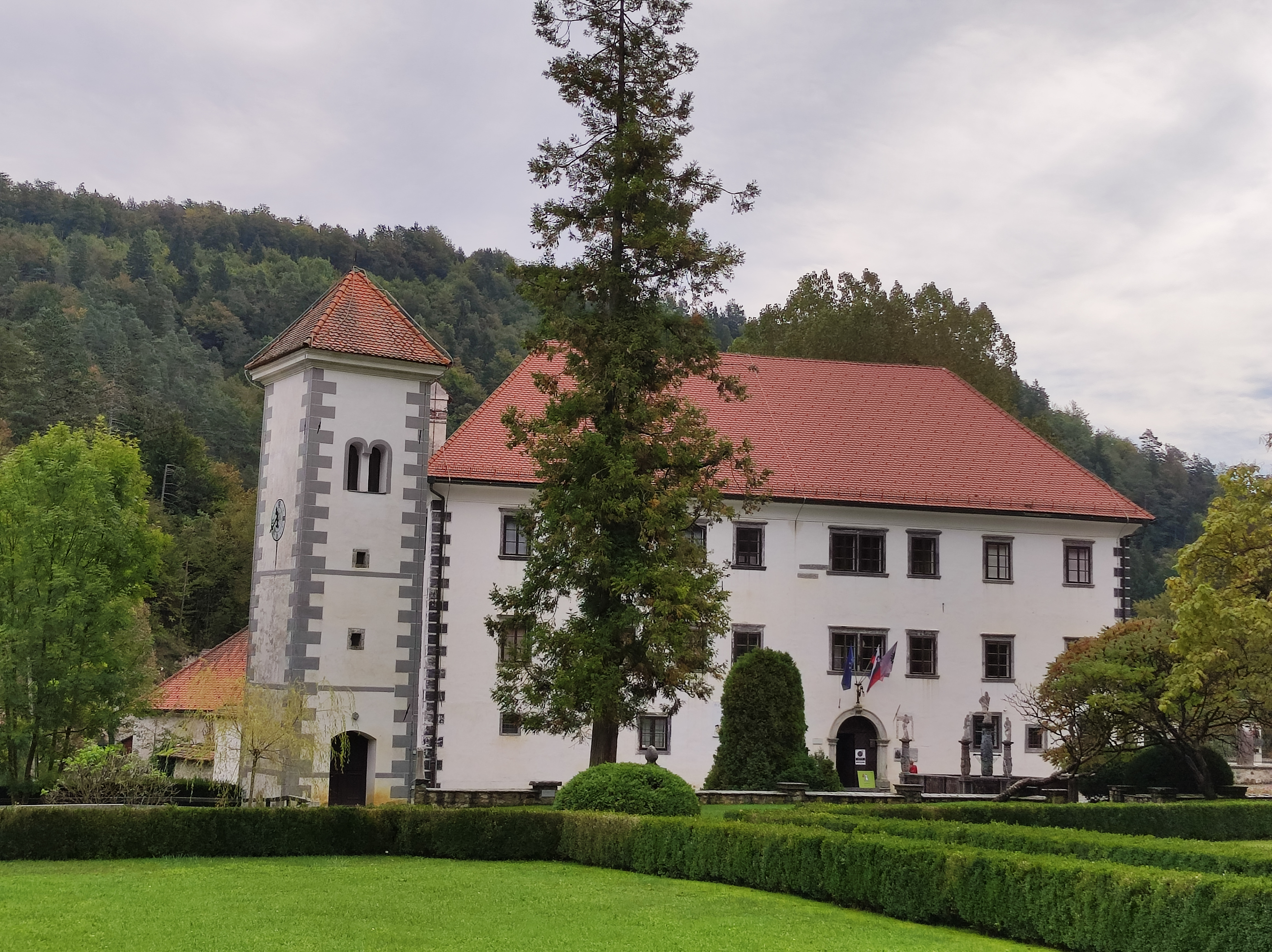
Polhov Gradec Castle today

Polhov Gradec Castle (Slovene: Grad Polhov Gradec, German: Billichgrätz or Pilchgrez, also known as the Old Castle, Stari Grad) is a castle ruin above the settlement of Polhov Gradec, in the Municipality of Dobrova–Polhov Gradec in central Slovenia. It is located on Calvary Hill (Kalvarija, also known as Old Castle–Calvary Hill, Stari grad - Kalvarija, 460 m) immediately northwest of the town center.

== History ==
The castle or fortress was built in the second half of the 12th century by the Spanheim ministeriales the knights Billichgrätz (Polhograjski). The noble Henrik Polhograjski was listed as the owner of the castle (or fort) of Pilchgrez in 1261. In 1360, half of the castle was obtained by count Otto of Ortenburg, and in the mid-14th century its owners were relatives of the Polhograjskis, the noble house of Gall. In 1364, Ulrik Polhograjski and his uncle Konrad Gall sold the castle and lordship to the counts of Celje. After the extinction of the house of Celje with the death of Ulrik II of Celje in 1456, the Polhov Gradec lordship passed to the Habsburgs. Around 1470, the Polhov Gradec line also became extinct, and the Habsburgs gave the estate in ducal fief to a succession of tenants, including the knights Luegger, Andreas von Gall (until 1504), and Baron Kasper von Lamberg (1492-1548).

The castle was damaged by the earthquakes of 1348 and 1511, but its death blow was struck in 1514 when it was thoroughly wrecked during a major peasant revolt, after which the site was abandoned and the lordship transferred to the lower castle, Polhov Gradec Manor (Polhograjska graščina).

At the site of the old castle an octagonal gloriette was later built, which Countess Antonia Ursini von Blagay (1792–1869), the last heir of the Billichgrätz family, turned into a chapel in 1853, adding 14 shrines for the Stations of the Cross to it to create a Calvary. In 1875, the castle was purchased by the Urbančič family, members of the local nobility and owners of Turn Castle. The buyer was Luiza Urbančič (1842–1918), the sister-in-law of Josipina Turnograjska, one of the first Slovene female writers, poets, and composers.
