= Primula grandiflora =

Primula grandiflora can refer to the following plant species:

- Primula grandiflora Bastard, a synonym of Primula carniolica Jacq.
- Primula grandiflora Lam., a synonym of Primula vulgaris Huds. subsp. vulgaris
