= Blagaj family =

Blagaj (Blagay)
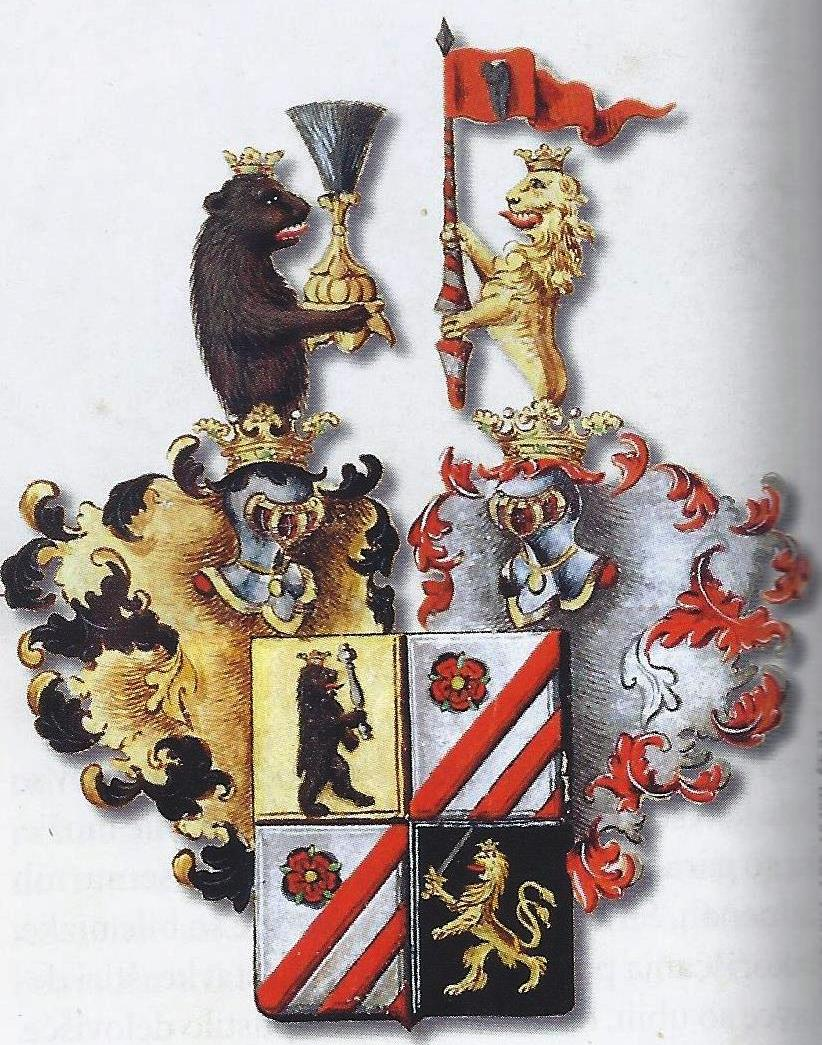
- Parent house: Babonić
- Country: Kingdom of Croatia; Kingdom of Hungary; Duchy of Carniola
- Founded: 13th century
- Founder: Nikola III Blagajski and Dujam Blagajski
- Current head: Extinct
- Titles: Counts of Ursini de Blagay
- Dissolution: 1898

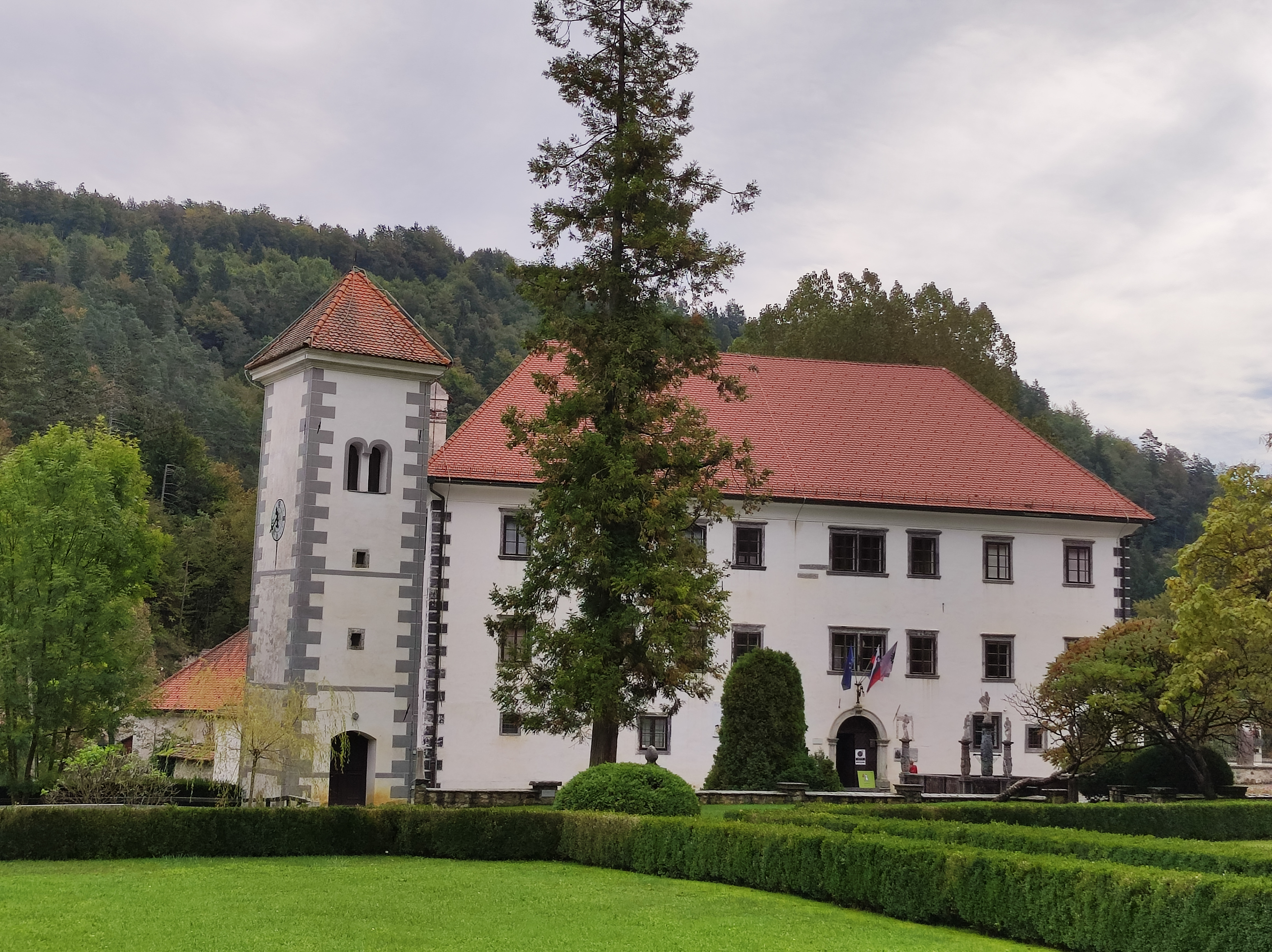
Polhov Gradec Castle, country residence of Counts Ursini von Blagay

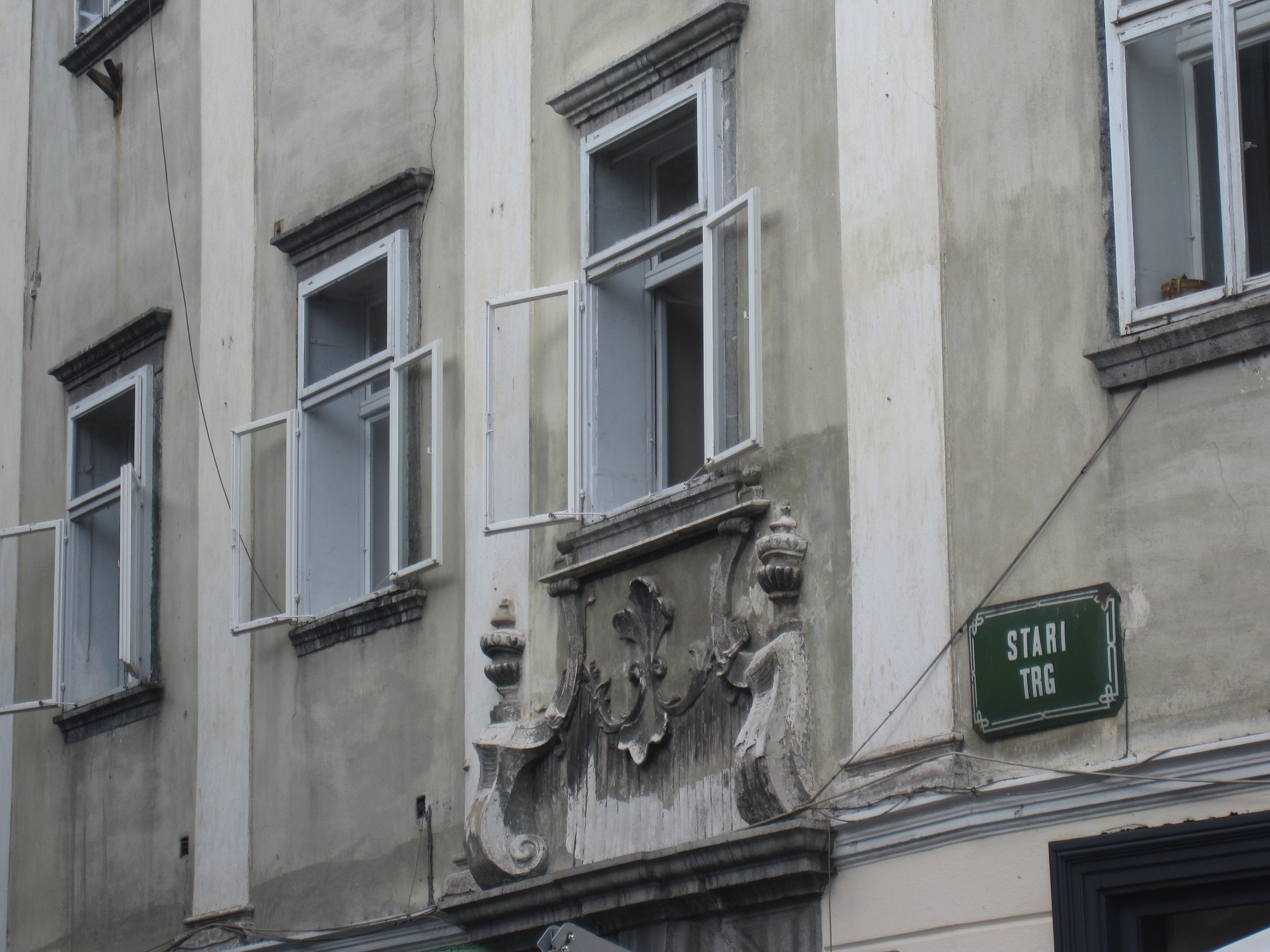
Detail of Ursini von Blagay palace, Town Square (Ljubljana)

The Blagaj family or Blagay were a Croatian noble family, hereditary counts (Croatian: knezovi Blagajski) that were a cadet branch of the medieval Babonić family, and named after their estate of Blagaj on the Sana in the 14th century. Over the course of the Croatian-Ottoman wars, they migrated to the northwest and by the end of the 16th century became part of Austrian and Slovenian nobility. They went extinct in the 19th century.

The Babonić family divided their properties in 1313 and 1314 between brothers Stjepan IV (d. 1316), Ivan (d. after 1334) and Radoslav II (fl. 1284–1314). Radoslav received the town and estate of Blagaj (Blagay), and his sons Nikola III and Dujam stopped using the name Babonić, rather referring to themselves as Counts of Blagaj.

Around 1430, wishing to link themselves to the oldest existing noble families of Europe, the family forged documents that allowed them to claim kinship to the House of Orsini, a Roman family that produced many Popes and Cardinals. Stephen of Blagaj (d. 1547) added the name "Ursinus" in front of his name. After Francis of Blagaj (d. 1576) successfully lobbied for the recognition of their forged documents with Emperor Maximilian II in 1571, the family continued to make these claims and would refer to themselves as Ursini von Blagay.

Stjepan IX Blagajski participated in the 1527 election in Cetin that brought Ferdinand I of Habsburg to the Croatian throne.

Around 1540, the Ottoman Empire had conquered Blagaj on the Sana, so the family relocated to the Blagaj Castle in Blagaj on the Korana.

After the marriage of Count Francis (Franz) to Maria Magdalena, Baroness von Lamberg (1540–1580), they also became owners of Boštanj Castle, which remained in their possession until the end of the 19th century. The family resettled to Carniola in 1545. This came about after the loss of their possessions in the Una Valley to the Ottomans. They automatically became part of the Austrian nobility.

In 1547, Stephen IX Blagaj bought a number of properties from Baron John III Ungnad (1493–1564): the estate of Kočevje, including the Friedrichstein/Fridrihštajn Castle, and estates in Metlika.

Stjepan X Blagajski (d. 1598 near Zvečaj Castle) participated in the 1593 Battle of Sisak.

Count Rihard Ursini von Blagay (1786–1858) was a Slovene aristocrat, botanist and patron of the arts, who mostly resided at Polhov Gradec. In 1808 he married Baroness Antonia von Billichgrätz zu Baumkircherthurm und Hilzenegkh (1791-1869), an heir to the Billichgrätz family, becoming the owner of Polhov Gradec Castle. Family members also had a prominent role in the Slovenian national revival in the 19th century.

With the death of Count Ludwig Ursini von Blagay (1830–1897), the family died out in male line in 1897. After his death, the descendants of his sister, Baroness Mathilde von Lauer (1833–1922), who outlived him for another 25 years, as designated heirs and next of kin, adopted the family name and incorporated into their own, being Barons Lauer-Ursini von Blagay.

== Notable members ==
- Count Franz Ursini von Blagay (d. 1576), member of the Babonić family and founder of the Counts Ursini von Blagay.
- Count Franz Adam Ursini von Blagay (1641-1716), Imperial Chamberlain and Vice-dominus of the Duchy of Carniola.
- Count Rihard Ursini von Blagay (1796-1858), an aristocrat, botanist, patron of the arts and owner of Polhov Gradec Castle.
