= Count Anton Alexander von Auersperg =

Austrian poet

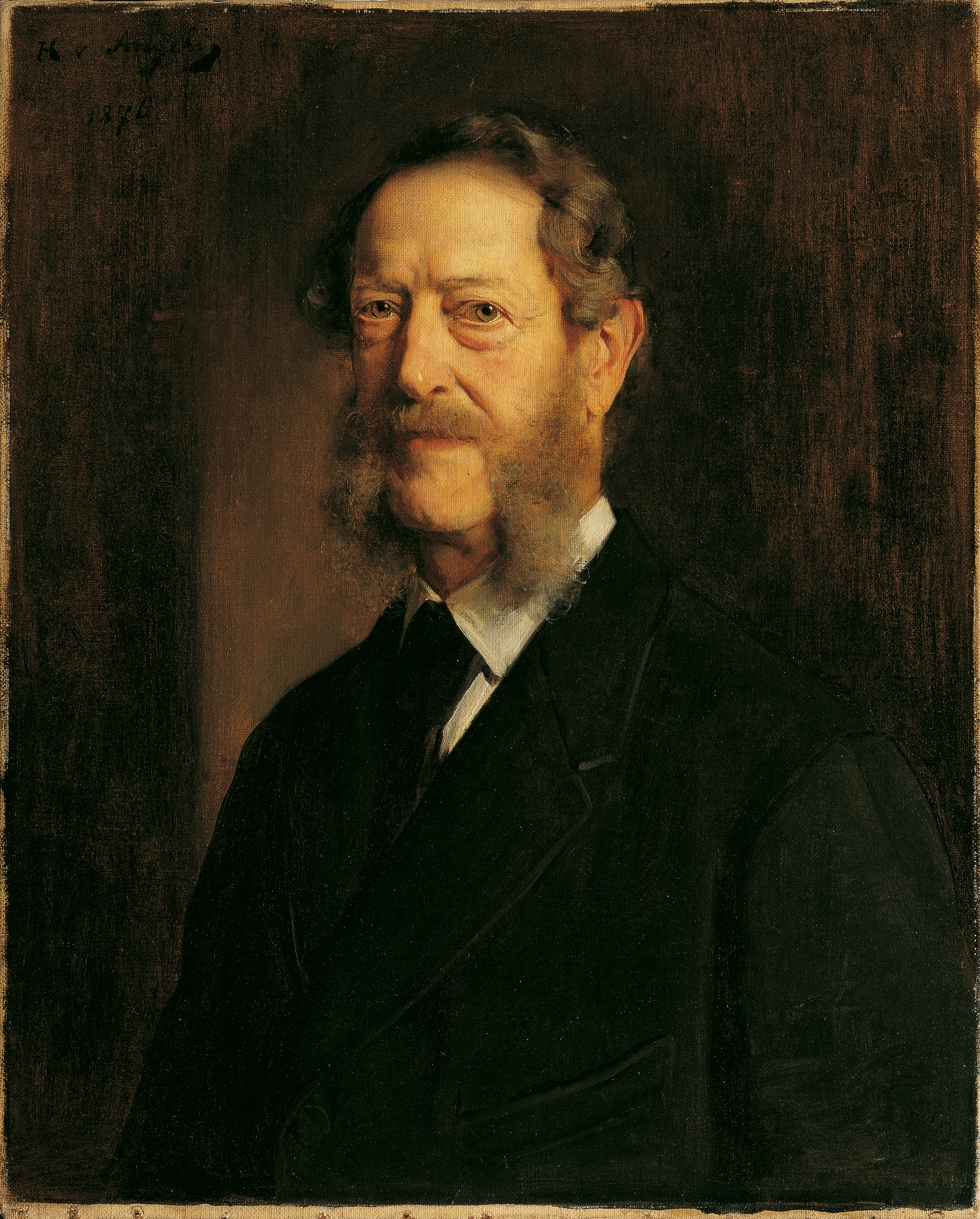
- Portrait of Grün by Heinrich von Angeli
- Born: 11 April 1806; Laibach, Austrian Empire
- Died: 12 September 1876 (aged 70); Graz, Austria-Hungary
- Education: University of Graz; University of Vienna
- Spouse: Maria Rosalia von Attems (m. 1839; died 1876)
- Children: Theodor Ignaz von Auersperg
- Parent(s): Alexander Maria Josef Riegfried Joachim von Auersperg; Maria Rosalia Cecilia von Billichgrätz-Baumkircherthurm-Hilzenegkh
- Relatives: Rihard Blagaj (cousin)

Count Anton Alexander von Auersperg (German: Anton Alexander, Graf von Auersperg), also known under the name Anastasius Grün (11 April 1806 – 12 September 1876), was an Austrian poet and liberal politician from Carniola, a former Habsburg crown land in today's Slovenia.

== Early life ==
He was born in Laibach (Ljubljana), and was head of the Thurn am Hart/Krain branch of the Carniolan line of the House of Auersperg. Anton Alexander was the only child of his parents, Count Alexander Maria Josef Riegfried Joachim von Auersperg (1770-1818) and his wife, Baroness Maria Rosalia Cecilia von Billichgrätz zu Baumkircherthurm und Hilzenegkh (1786-1836).

Anton's maternal uncle in law, and also paternal first cousin, was Count Rihard Ursini von Blagay, a Slovene aristocrat, botanist and patron of the arts. He received his education first at the University of Graz and then at Vienna, where he studied jurisprudence. In Vienna, he met with fellow Carniolan countryman France Prešeren, who would later become the national poet of the Slovenes. The two established a close friendship which lasted till Prešeren's death in 1849. Prešeren also dedicated an ironic short poem to Auersperg, called Tri želje Anastazija Zelenca ("Three Wishes of the Green Anastasius"), in which he made fun of the friend's bohemian lifestyle.

== Career ==
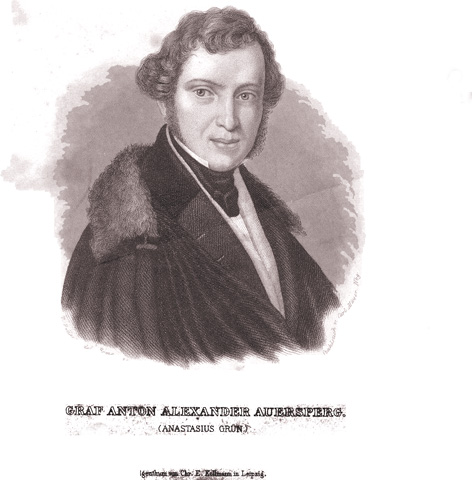

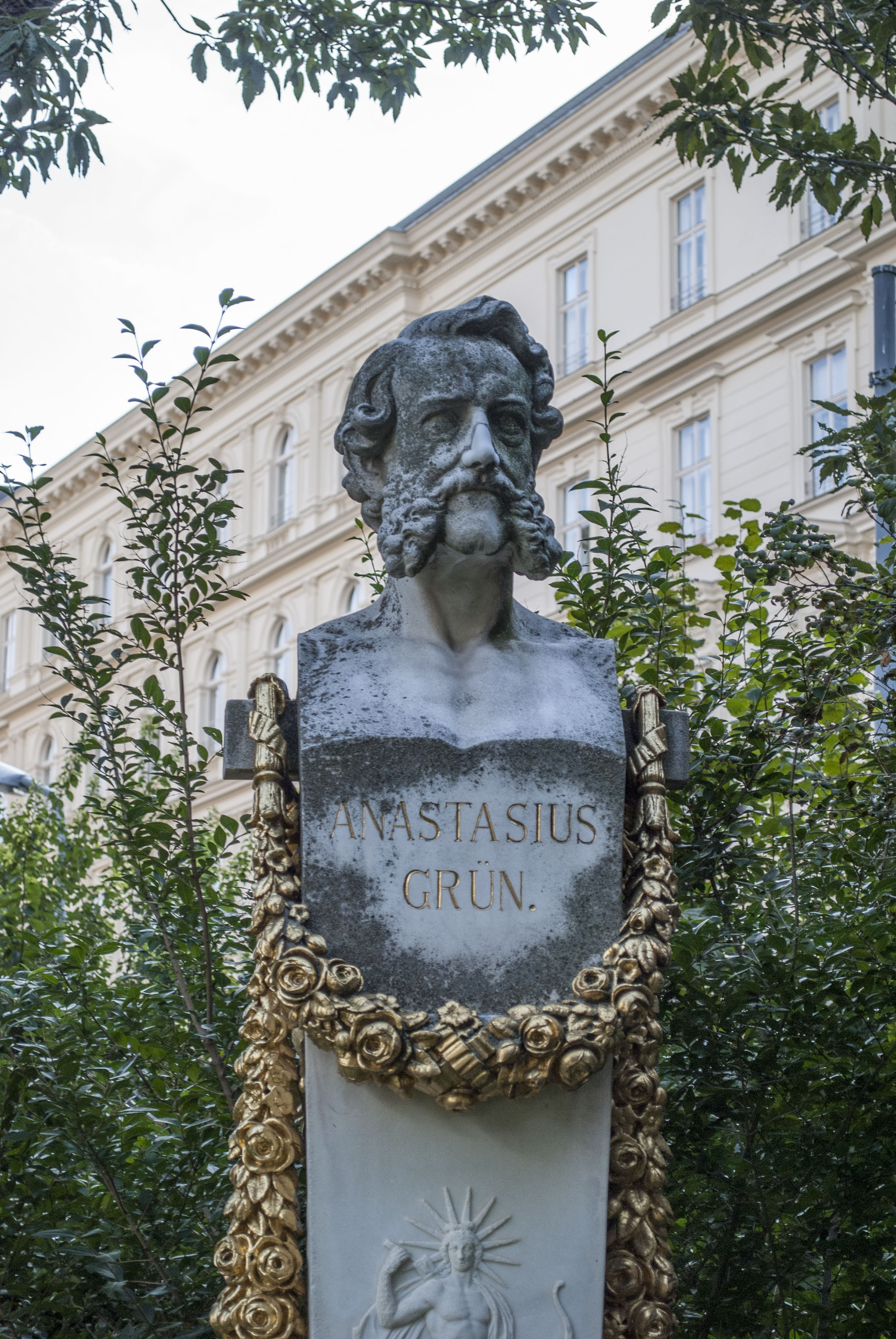
Anastasius Grün monument

In 1830, Auersperg succeeded to his ancestral property, and in 1832 appeared as a member at the Estates of Carniola in the Lords' Bench of the diet in Laibach. Here he distinguished himself by his outspoken criticism of the Austrian government, leading the opposition of the duchy to the exactions of the central power. In 1832 the title of Imperial Chamberlain was conferred upon him.

After the Revolution of 1848 in Vienna he represented the district of Laibach in the German Frankfurt Parliament, to which he tried in vain to persuade his Slovene compatriots to send representatives. After a few months, however, disgusted with the violent development of the revolution, he resigned his seat, and again retired into private life. In 1860 he was summoned to the remodelled Reichsrat by the emperor, and next year nominated him a life member of the Austrian upper house (Herrenhaus), where, while remaining a keen upholder of the German centralized empire, as against the federalism the Slavs and Magyars, he greatly distinguished himself as one of the most intrepid and influential supporters of the cause of Realism, in both political and religious matters. He also served in the Diet of Carniola, where he was among the leaders of the Austrian Constitutionalists in Carniola, together with Karl Deschmann.

=== Literary work ===
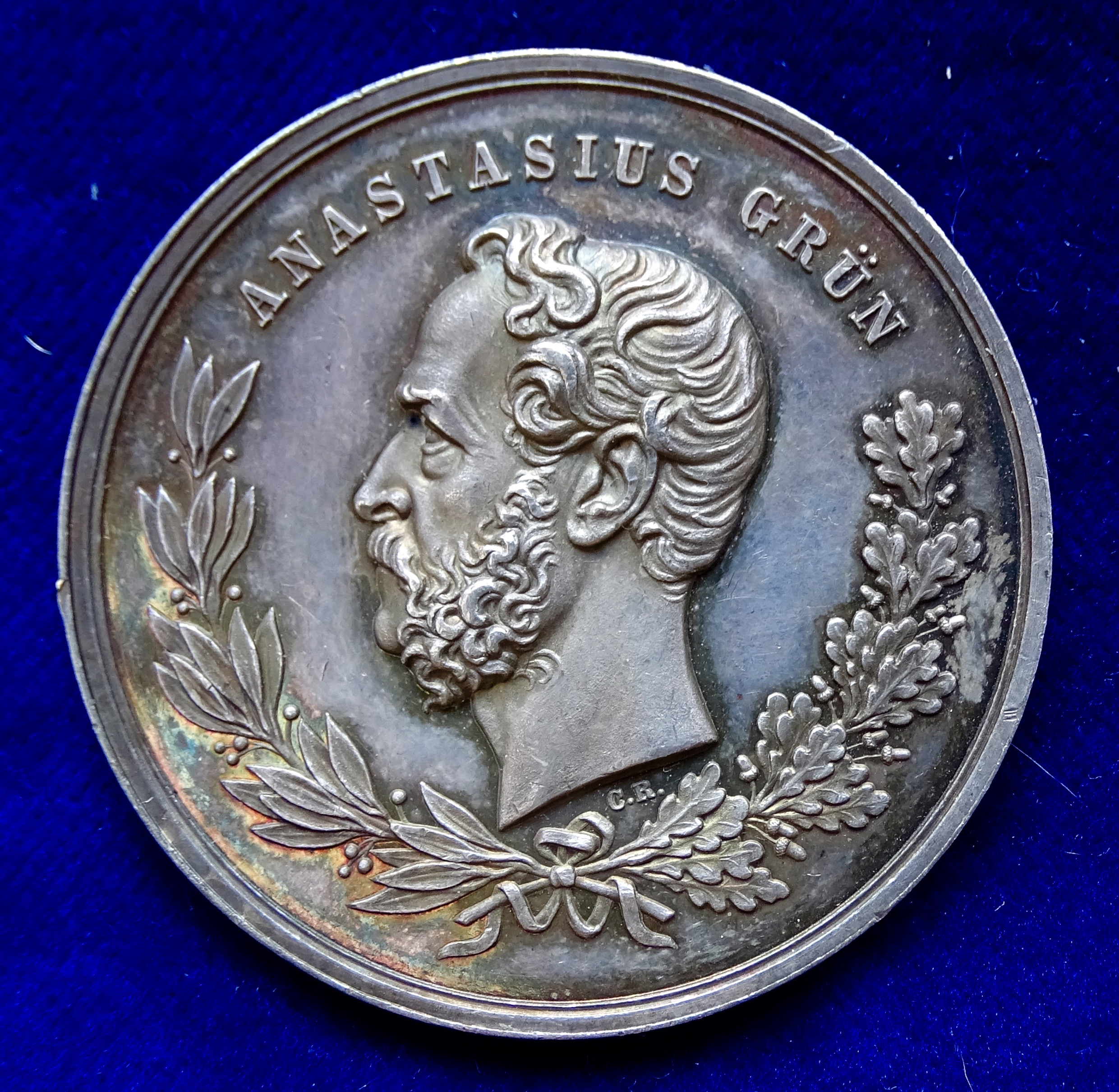
Concordia commemorative medal for Auersperg's 70th birthday 1876 in Vienna. Medallist Carl Radnitzky. (Obverse)

In Count Auersperg's first publication, a collection of lyrics, Blätter der Liebe (1830), showed little originality; but his second production, Der letzte Ritter (1830), brought his genius to light. It celebrates the deeds and adventures of Emperor Maximillian I (1499–1519) in a cycle of poems written in the strophic rhyme of the Nibelungenlied. But Auersperg's fame rests almost exclusively on his political poetry; two collections entitled Spaziergänge eines Wiener Poeten (1831), an attack upon the Metternich regime, and Schutt (1835) created a sensation in Germany by their originality and bold Realism. These two books, which are remarkable not merely for their outspoken opinions, but also for their easy versification and powerful imagery, were the forerunners of the German political poetry of 1840–1848.

His Gedichte (1837), if anything, increased his reputation; his epics, Nibelungen im Frack (1843) and Pfaff vom Kahlenberg (1850), are characterized by a fine ironic humour. He also produced masterly translations of the popular Slovene songs from Carniola (Volkslieder aus Krain, 1850), and of the English poems relating to Robin Hood (1864). He also translated several poems by France Prešeren into German.

Anastasius Grün's Sämtliche Werke (Collected works) were published by L. A. Frankl in 5 vols. (Berlin, 1877); the Briefwechsel zwischen A. G. und Ludwig Frankl (Correspondence between A. G. and Ludwig Frankl) was published in Berlin in 1897. A selection of his Politische Reden und Schriften was published by S. Hock (Vienna, 1906).

== Personal life ==
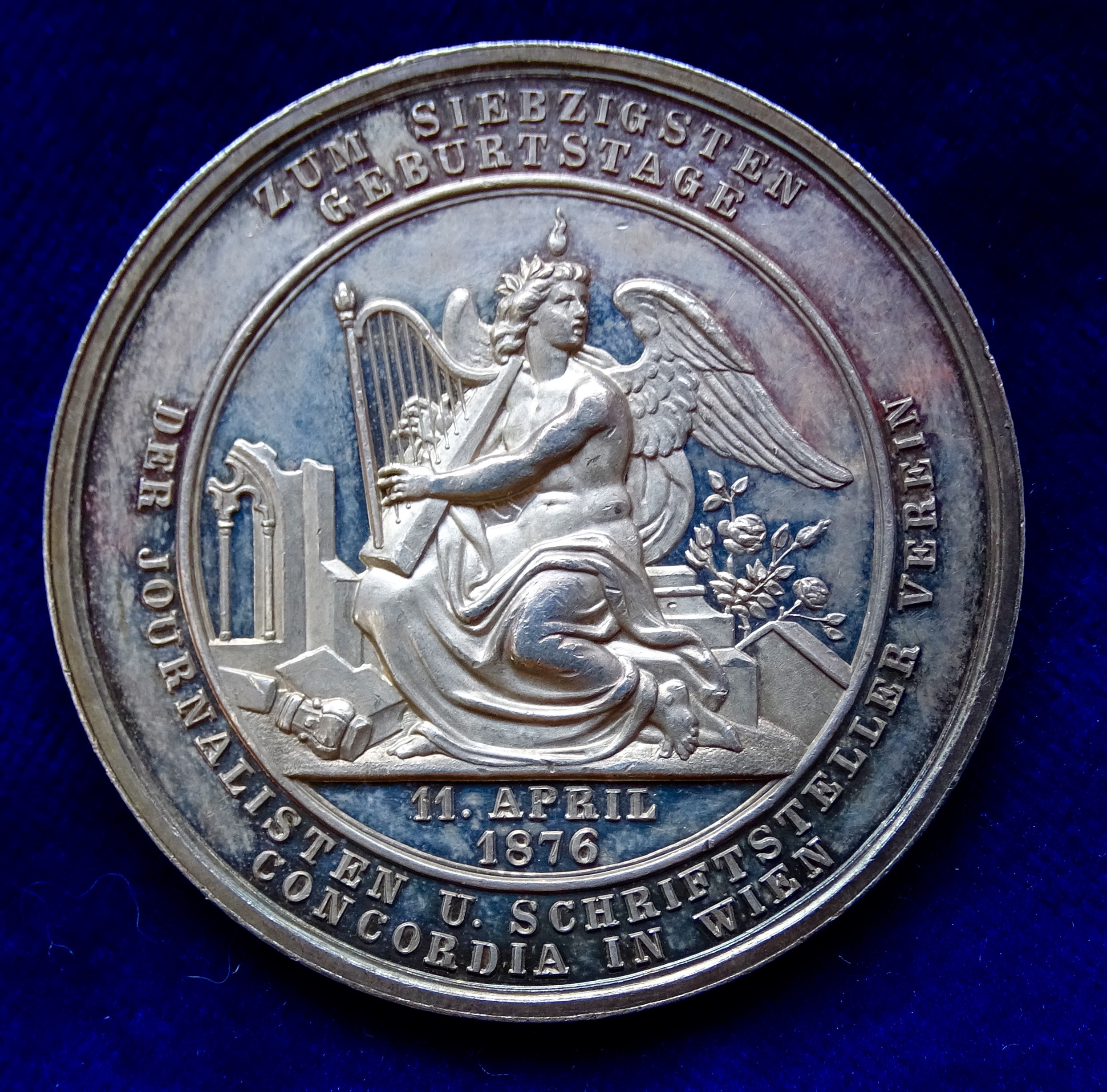
Concordia commemorative medal for Auersperg's 70th birthday 1876 in Vienna. Medallist Carl Radnitzky. (Reverse)

In 1839, he married Countess Maria Rosalia von Attems (1816-1880), daughter of Count Ignaz Maria von Attems (1774-1861), Governor of Styria and his wife, Baroness Aloysia Inzaghi von Kindberg (1793-1879). Together, they had one son:

- Count Theodor Ignaz von Auersperg (1859–1881), who died unmarried.

Count von Auersperg died on 12 September 1876.
