= Potoče, Preddvor =

Potoče
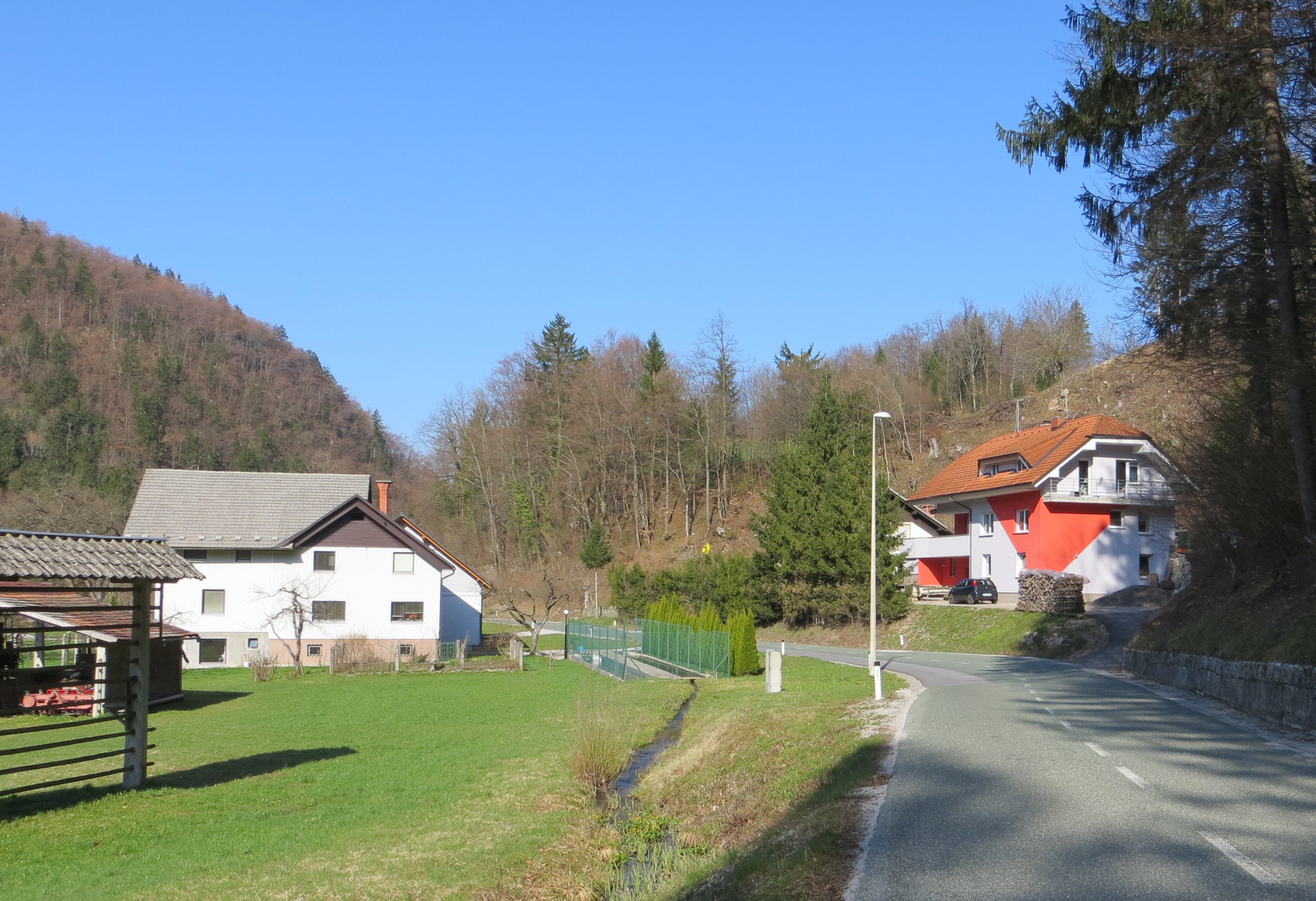

- Location in Slovenia
- Coordinates: 46°18′20.22″N 14°26′14.45″E
- Country: Slovenia
- Traditional region: Upper Carniola
- Statistical region: Upper Carniola
- Municipality: Preddvor

Area
  - Total: 5.14 km^{2} (1.98 sq mi)
- Elevation: 527 m (1,729 ft)

Population (2002)
  - Total: 322

Potoče (pronounced [pɔˈtoːtʃɛ]) is a settlement in the Municipality of Preddvor in the Upper Carniola region of Slovenia.

== Castle ==
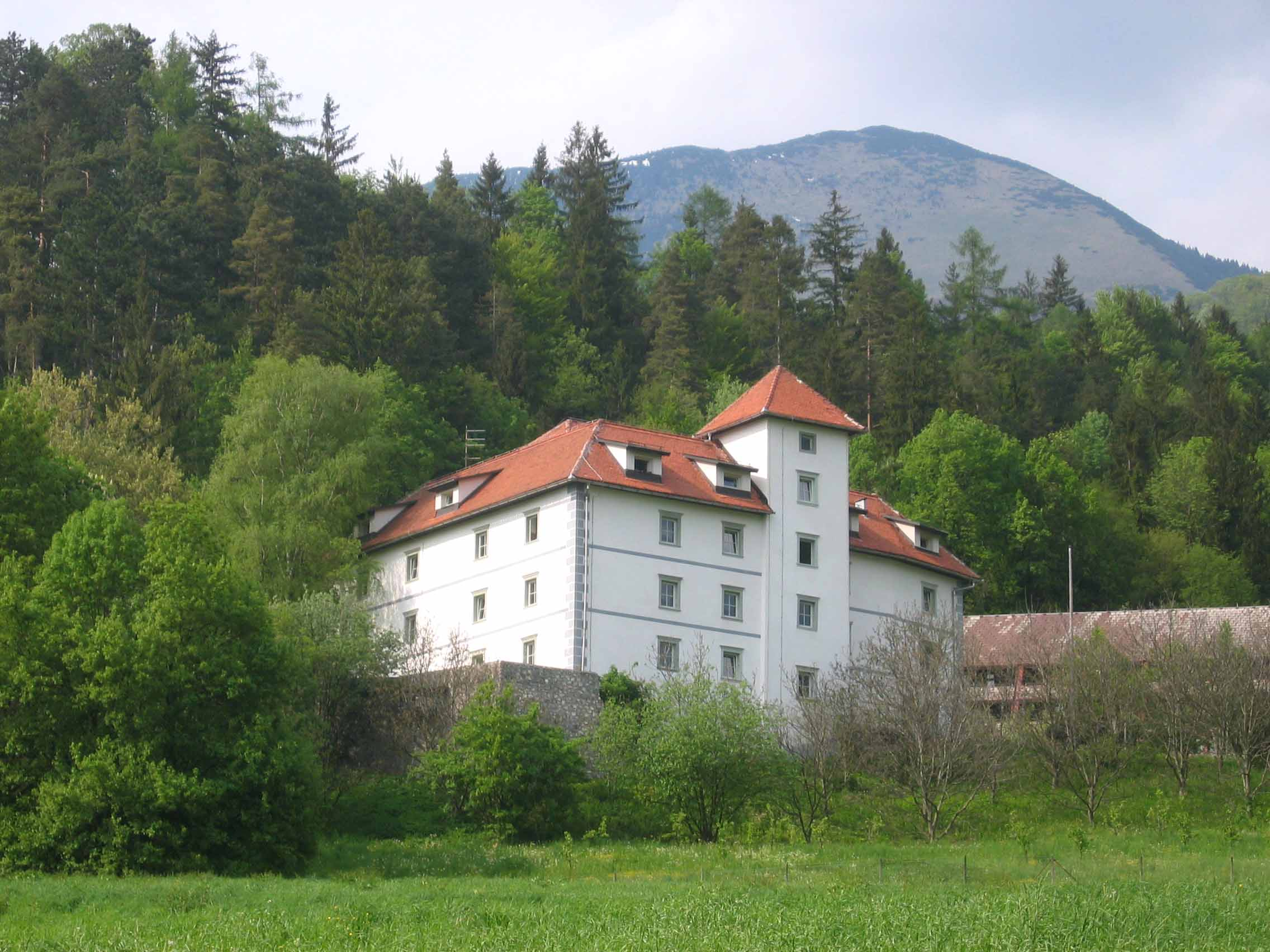
Turn Castle

Just outside the settlement stands Turn Castle, the birthplace of Josipina Turnograjska.

== Church ==
The local church, built on a hill above the settlement, is dedicated to Saint James.
