= Heinrich Freyer =

Austrian paleontologist and botanist

- Born: July 8, 1802; Idrija
- Died: August 21, 1866 (aged 64); Ljubljana
- Education: University of Vienna
- Known for: Botany
- Scientific career
- Fields: Botany, pharmacy, natural science, geography, cartography
- Author abbrev. (botany): Freyer

Heinrich Freyer (Slovenized: Henrik Freyer; July 8, 1802 – August 21, 1866) was a Carniolan botanist, zoologist, paleontologist, pharmacist, cartographer, and natural scientist. The standard author abbreviation Freyer is used to indicate this person as the author when citing a botanical name.
