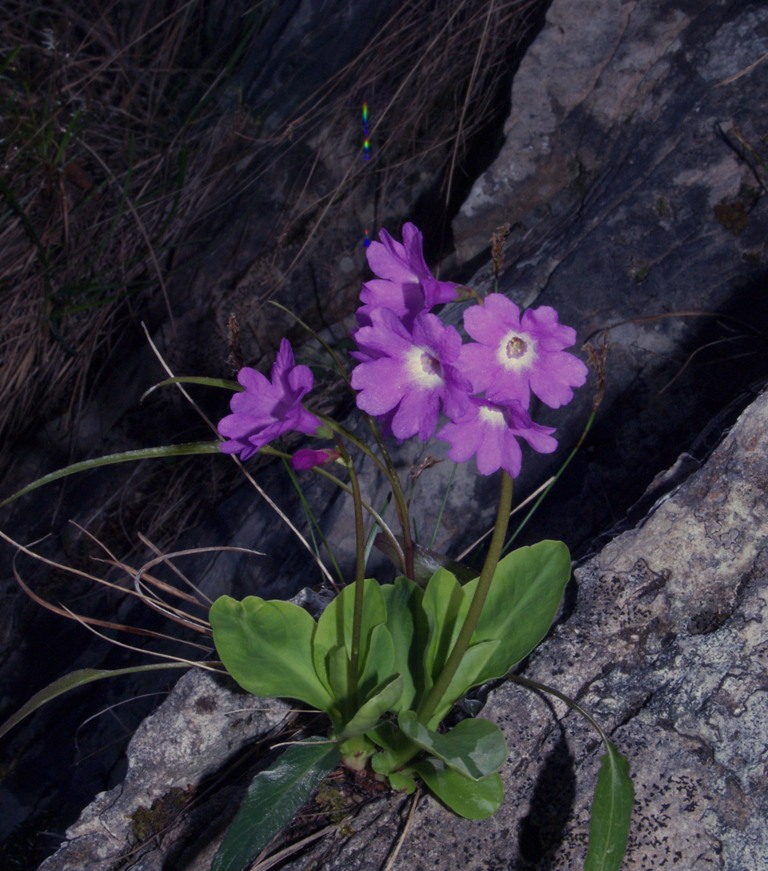

Conservation status
- Least Concern (IUCN 3.1)

Scientific classification
- Kingdom: Plantae
- Clade: Tracheophytes
- Clade: Angiosperms
- Clade: Eudicots
- Clade: Asterids
- Order: Ericales
- Family: Primulaceae
- Genus: Primula
- Species: P. carniolica

Binomial name
- Primula carniolica Jacq.

= Primula carniolica =

Species of flowering plant

Primula carniolica is a flowering plant in the primrose family known by the common name Carniolan primrose. It is endemic to Slovenia.

== Description ==
It grows to a height of c. 3–12 centimetres (1.2–4.7 in) and is typically 1–4 centimetres (0.39–1.57 in) broad. The stem, base and leaves are clear green, fleshy and lack the coating that can be seen in some other primroses. The flowers are 20–25 millimetres (0.79–0.98 in) across and a mild red, rose or purple pink in colour. They give away fragrance and have a slight coating of white particles in the throat. The plant flowers between April and May.

Its range is limited to an area of approximately 5,000 square kilometres (1,900 sq mi) in the Slovenian regions of Upper, Lower and Inner Carniola, as well as the Slovene Littoral, including on the Trnovo Forest Plateau and in the Iška River gorge. Within its range the plant grows on north-facing wet limestone cliffs, ravines and meadows at an altitude of 900–1,000 metres (3,000–3,300 ft).

It has been a protected species in Slovenia since 1922 and it is consequentially forbidden to pick the flowers. Primula carniolica is rarely cultivated.

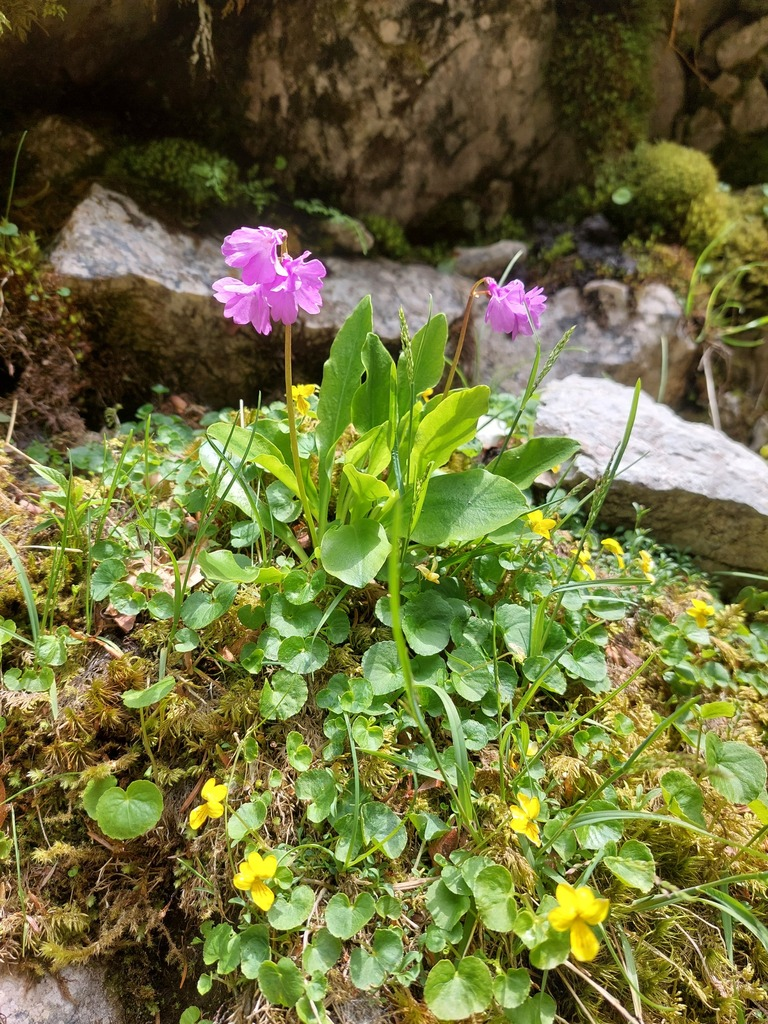

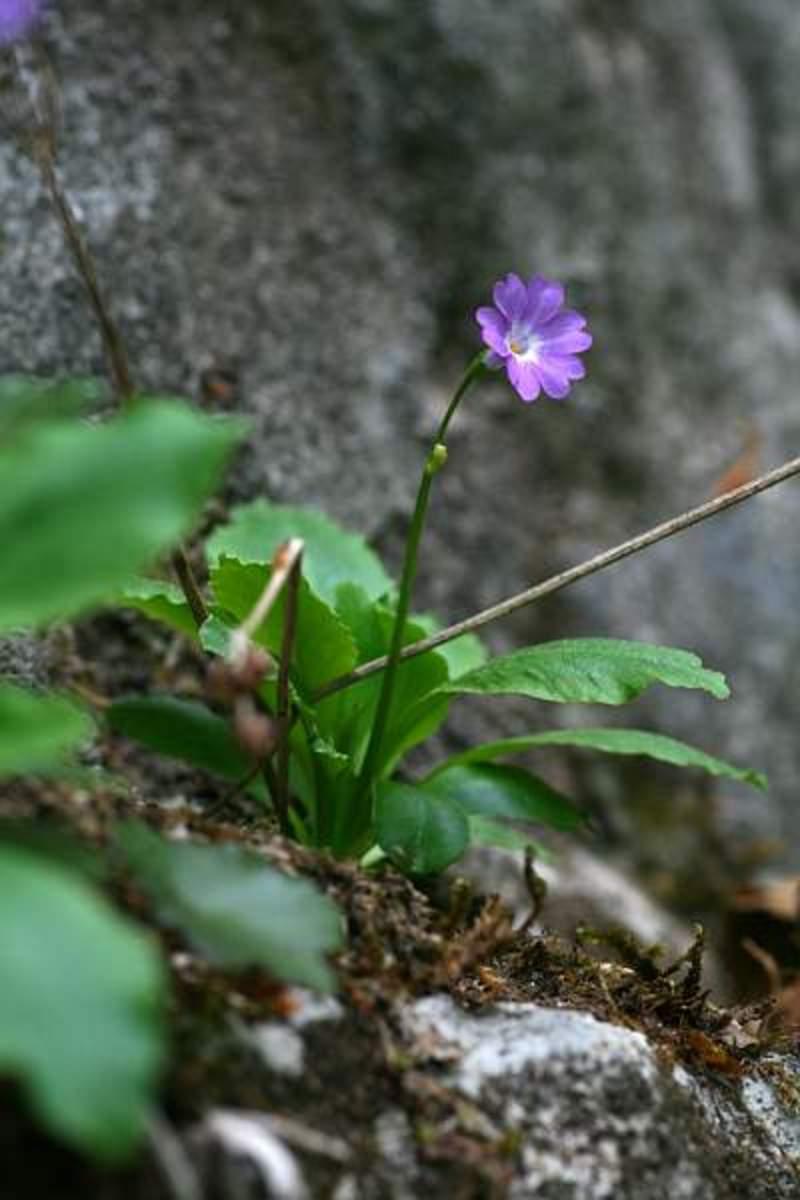

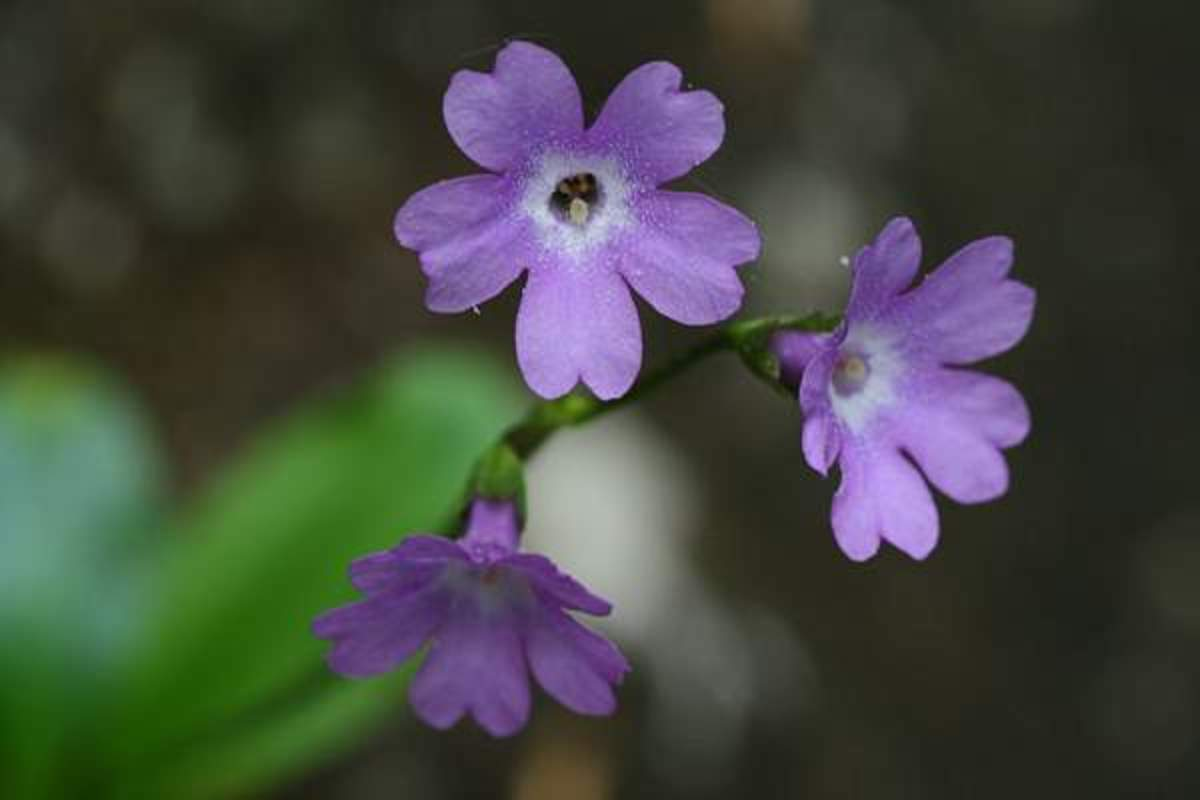

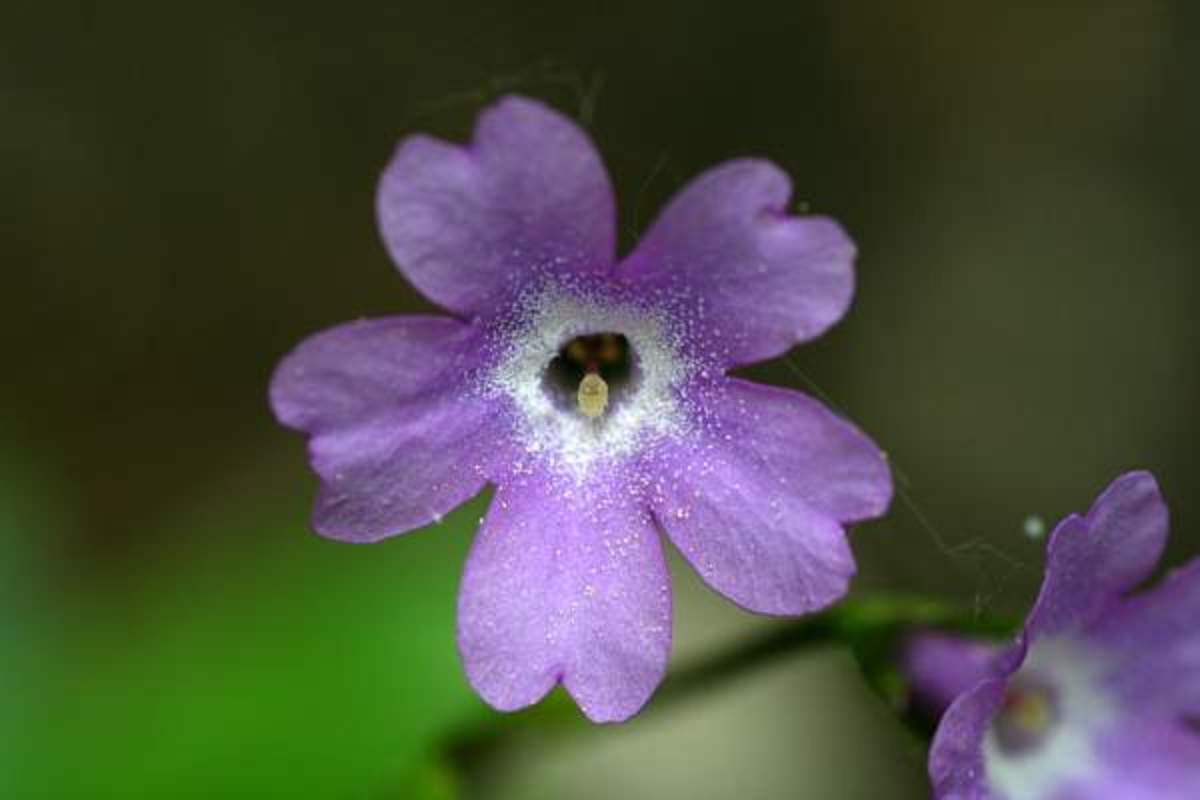

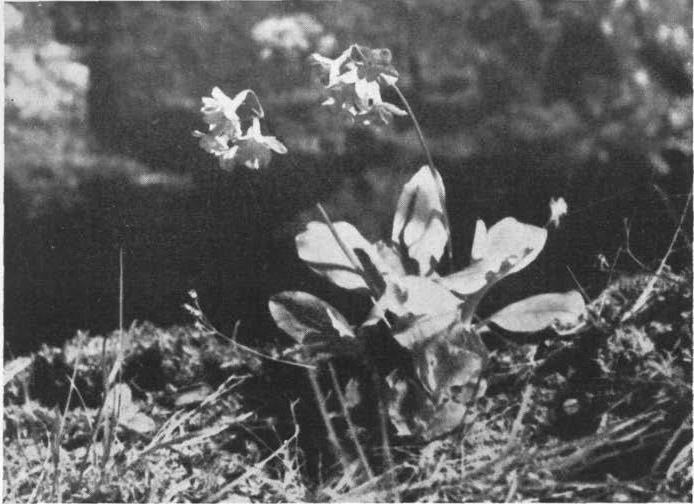
