= Turn Castle, Preddvor =

Castle in Slovenia

Coordinates: 46°18′19.5″N 14°25′58.78″E

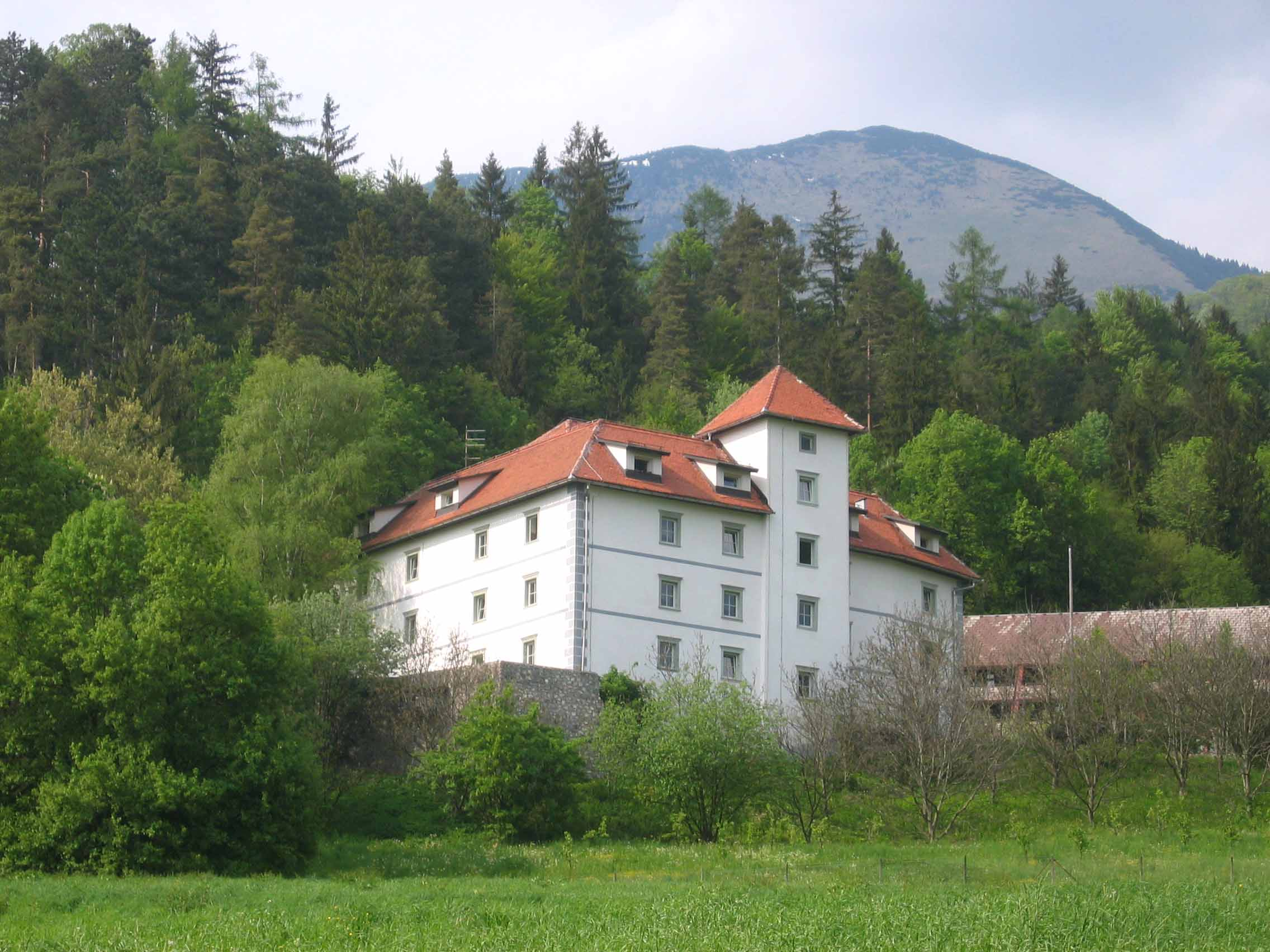
Turn Castle

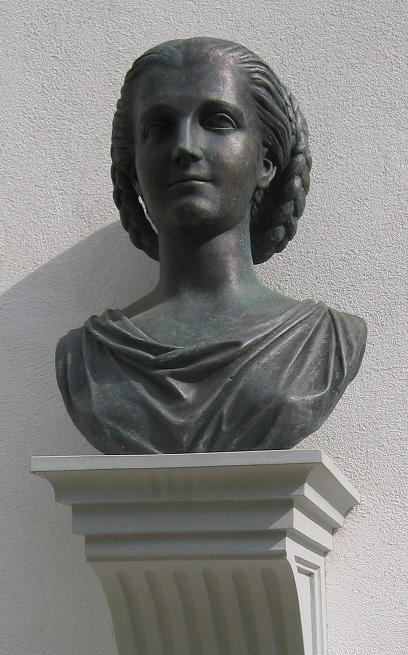
Bust of Josipina Turnograjska on the facade

Turn Castle (Slovene: Grad Turn, German: Thurn) is a castle near the village of Potoče in the Municipality of Preddvor in the Upper Carniolan region of Slovenia.

== History ==
The castle was first mentioned in 1408 and was probably built in the mid-14th century. In the early 15th century, it came into the possession of the Counts of Celje. The original castle was severely damaged in 1439, during the fights between the Habsburgs and the Counts of Celje, and again by the Ottoman Turks in 1473. With the extinction of the Counts of Celje, the castle became a possession of the Habsburgs. Emperor Maximilian I sold it to the local nobleman Jurij von Egkh, who was the general administrator of Habsburg estates in Carniola, who owned several castles in the region, including Brdo pri Kranju. Egkh rebuilt Turn, using some elements of the Renaissance style. In 1793 it was acquired by Martin Urbančič (1750–1796), who was also the administrator of Brdo Castle near Kranj. Urbančič was the grandfather of the renowned Slovene poet Josipina Turnograjska, who was born in the castle in 1821. In 1909, the castle was bought by Oton von Detela, who belonged to the local Slovene gentry. After World War II, the Detela family's property was expropriated by the Communist regime. The castle was first used as a military barracks for the Yugoslav People's Army and since 1962 it has housed a retirement home.

A bust of Josipina Turnograjska is on the facade of the castle.
