= Josipina Turnograjska =

Slovenian poet and composer (1833–1854)

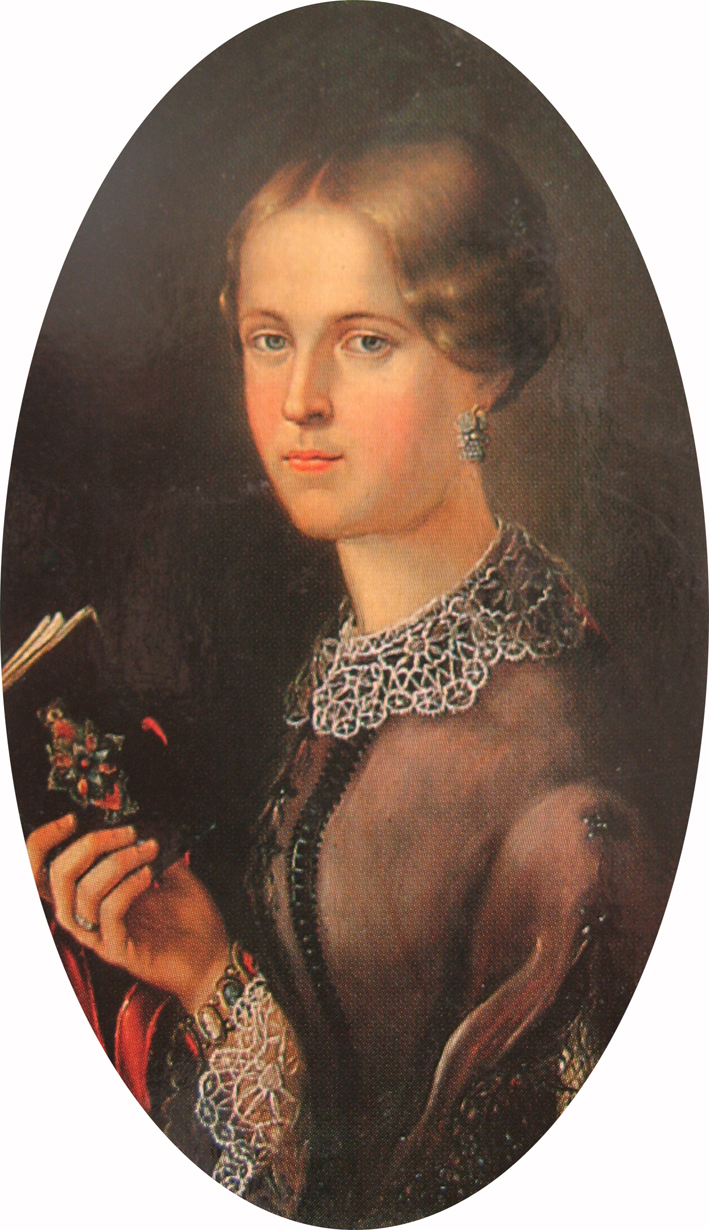
- Portrait of Josipina Konstancija Ana Urbančič by Henrika Langus
- Born: Josepha Constantia Anna Urbantschitsch; 9 July 1833; Turn Castle, Preddvor, Kingdom of Illyria, Austrian Empire (now in Slovenia)
- Died: 1 June 1854 (aged 20); Graz, Duchy of Styria, Austrian Empire (now in Austria)
- Occupations: Writer, poet
- Writing career
- Genre: Panslavism
- Movement: Romanticism

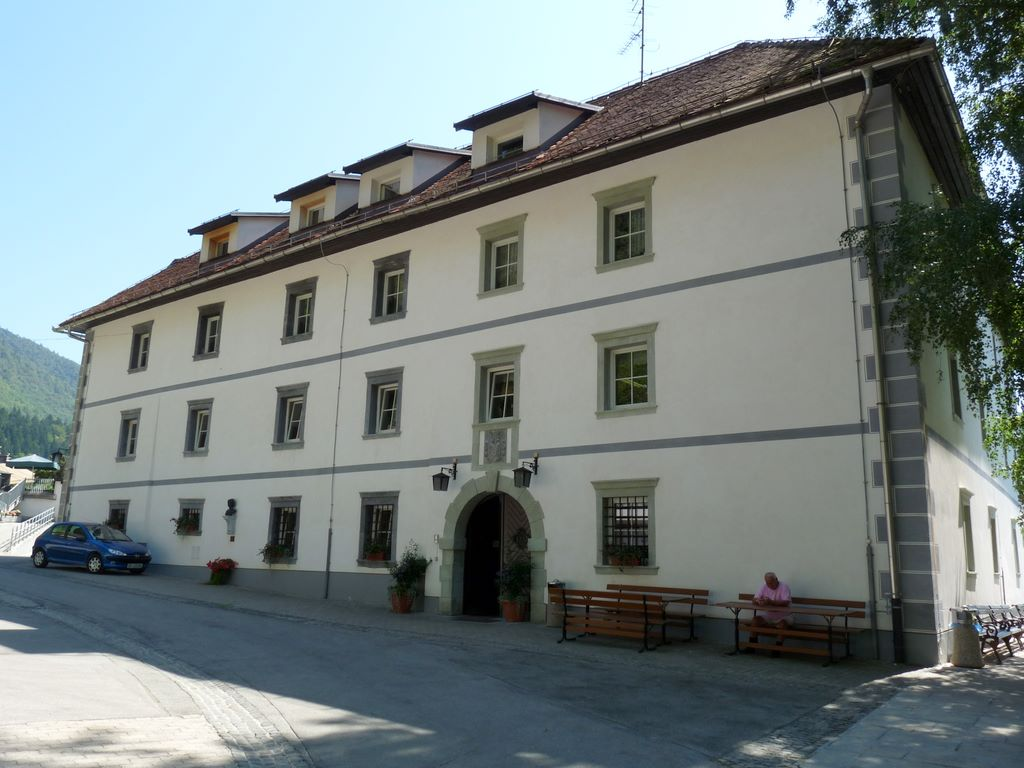
Jospipina's childhood home: Turn Castle

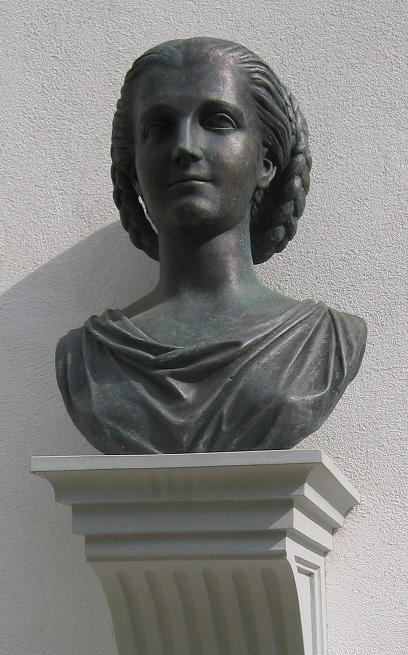
Josipina Turnograjska's bust Franc Ksaver Zajec, on the facade of Turn Castle, Potoče, Municipality of Preddvor, Upper Carniola, Slovenia

Josipina Urbančič (married name Toman), who published under the pen name Josipina Turnogradska (later respelled Turnograjska, 9 July 1833 – 1 June 1854), was one of the first Slovene female writers, poets, and composers.

== Biography ==
Josipina was baptized Josepha Constantia Anna Urbantschitsch. She was born at Turn Castle in what was then the Austrian Empire, (now part of the municipality of Preddvor), from which she also derived her pseudonym Turnogradska (literally 'of Turn Castle'). When sending her first story to the editor of the literary magazine Slovenska Bčela she explained the choice of name by writing: "Slavic sons are keen to show their strength and worth. Why should Slav daughters not have the same desire? This is why I have decided to try to write something in my own mild language and I dare send into daylight one story from my collection and ask you to include it in your publication. Let my name be Josipina Turnogradska, since Turn Castle is my home." Her parents were Johann Nepomuk Urbantschitsch and Josephina Terpinz, who belonged to the local Carniolan gentry. Her father died when she was eight. She was educated by private tutors at Turn Castle, particularly in music, religion, as well as in Latin and Italian. She taught herself French. After 1849 a new tutor expanded the subjects of her instruction to include Ancient Greek, natural sciences, and history, with a particular emphasis on Slovene and the history of Slavic peoples. This proved to be the catalyst for the awakening of a national enthusiasm in Josipina, which made her decide to become a writer. In 1850 she was engaged to Lovro Toman, a poet that would later become a successful lawyer and influential politician. Toman studied law in Graz and during their engagement the two maintained an extensive correspondence. More than a thousand letters survive, some up to twenty-five pages long. Their interest is not only in showing the relationship and feelings of two separated lovers, but also because they give an important insight into everyday life in the mid-19th century in the Slovene Lands. In 1853 they were married and due to Toman's work moved permanently to Graz. Josipina died there a year later after a combination of complications at childbirth and measles. She was only 20.

== Work ==
Josipina had extended knowledge of Slovene and European literature and greatly admired France Prešeren’s poetry (she copied his style in her writing) and German Romantic writers, as well as popular adventure novels of the time. There is an emphasis in her writings on the role of women as writers as well as in national awakening. Her work was appreciated in other areas of the Slav-speaking world (Russia and the Czech Lands), mainly because she wrote in a Slavic language. In the period following the fall of the absolutist Metternich regime, strict censorship was loosened and cultural activities with a stronger Slovene and Slavic note started to blossom. Josipina's work was marked by the ideas of Romantic Nationalism, which in the Slovene Lands was connected with Slav mutualism and Panslavism.

In her brief creative life, Josipina Turnograjska wrote around thirty stories, the first when she was only seventeen. She picked her material from the history of Slovenes and other Slavic peoples, as well as from popular legends. She gave great emphasis to poetical descriptions of nature. Five of her stories were published in the literary magazines Slovenska Čbela ("The Slovene Bee", 1851) edited by Anton Janežič, three in Zora ("Dawn") and one in the almanac Vodnikov spomenik ("Vodnik's Monument", 1852–1853). Around twenty texts remained unpublished at the time of her death.

One of her best-known works is the tale of Veronika of Desenice, a tragic heroine from the Renaissance period that was killed due to her involvement in a love affair at the court of the Counts of Celje. In the story, entitled Nedolžnost in sila (Innocence and Force), she developed the motif of Veronika as a Slavic heroine and Slavicized the names of Hermann II of Celje and his son Frederick to Jerman and Miroslav. Another story, Rožmanova Lenčica, also featured a female heroine from the 15th century that went to fight against the Turks in place of her murdered father and returned marry her lover on Bled Island. Other important stories include Izdajstvo in sprava (Betrayal and Reconciliation), about the Albanian hero Kastriot Skanderbeg, Povest o Bolgarskem knezu Borisu (The Tale of Bulgarian Duke Boris) about the conversion of the Bulgarians to Christianity, and the story Slavljanski mučenik (A Slavic Martyr) about the Slovak political hero Vilko Šulek executed by the Hungarians. In Svatoboj puščavnik (Svatoboj the Hermit), she wrote about a defeated leader that went into the desert where, in simple surroundings, he recognized the importance of life. She wrote two poems: Zmiraj krasna je narava (Always Beautiful Is Nature) and Donava (The Danube). She also composed a number of songs for the piano with Slovene lyrics.

== Sources ==
- Nataša Budna Kodrič, "Zgodba Josipine Turnograjske in Lovra Tomana" Kronika 51 (2003), 197–216.
- Mira Delavec, Nedolžnost in sila, življenje in delo Josipine Urbančič Turnograjske (Kranj: Gorenjski glas, 2004).
- Helga Glušič, Sto Slovenskih Pripovednikov (Ljubljana: Prešernova družba, 1996) ISBN 961-6186-21-3
- Ivan Lah, Josipina Turnograjska: njeno življenje in delo (Maribor: Slovenska ženska knjižnica, 1921).
- Alenka Šelih et al., Pozabljena polovica: portreti žensk 19. in 20. stoletja na Slovenskem (Ljubljana: SASA, 2007).
- Blažić, Milena Mileva "A Survey of Slovenian Women Fairy Tale Writers." CLCWeb: Comparative Literature and Culture 15.1 (2013): <https://doi.org/10.7771/1481-4374.2064>
