= Metod Trobec =

Slovenian serial killer

- Born: June 6, 1948; Planina nad Horjulom, Socialist Republic of Slovenia, Socialist Federal Republic of Yugoslavia
- Died: May 30, 2006 (aged 57); Dob pri Mirni Correctional Facility, Slovenska Vas, Southeast Slovenia Statistical Region, Slovenia
- Penalty: Death; commuted to 20 years in prison (murders); 15 years imprisonment (prison assaults)

Details
- Victims: 5–6
- Span of crimes: 1967–1979
- Country: Slovenia
- State: Central Slovenia
- Date apprehended: For the final time in July 1979

Metod Trobec (June 6, 1948 – May 30, 2006) was a Slovene serial killer. A career criminal with a record dating back to 1967, he gained notoriety for murdering five women in a homestead in Dolenja Vas pri Polhovem Gradcu from 1976 to 1978, whose remains he burned inside a stove. The brutality of the crimes led him to become one of the most infamous Slovenes in the country's history, with one website stating that he was more well-known than most politicians.

The last convict to be sentenced to death in the country, his sentence was commuted and he spent the rest of his life in prison. On May 30, 2006, Trobec committed suicide while imprisoned at the Dob pri Mirni Correctional Facility.

== Early life ==
Metod Trobec was born on June 6, 1948, in the village of Planina nad Horjulom. He and his twin sister, Cirila, were born to an unnamed father and a farmer named Marija Trobec, who had two other children from previous marriages. They lived on a farm without any running water, which was given to Trobec's mother during the land reform.

According to his mother, Trobec began to walk at age four and could speak at age five, but failed the seventh grade and was unable to finish primary school due to learning difficulties. Neighbors stated that when he was 14 or 15, Metod had burned down several haystacks, a statement his mother claimed was false. After completing his compulsory service in the military, Trobec went to work in West Germany, ostensibly because of the higher salaries. He worked there from 1971 to 1974, where he trained to be an automechanic.

=== Adult life and places of residence ===
After returning to Slovenia, Trobec met and married Štefka Kvas, who was 21 years older than him. At his later trials, she claimed that her husband was always rude to her in their intimate life, appeared to be overly attached to his mother, and that Metod also had brought stolen items back to their home. The pair would separate and Trobec remarried to another woman in 1978, but they divorced after only nine months. His second ex-wife did not attend his later trial in 1982, despite a summons from the court.

Between 1971 and 1972, Marija Trobec purchased a homestead in Dolenja Vas pri Polhovem Gradcu for 11 million dinars - she allegedly sold some of the family's cattle to make it, with some claiming that she had received additional financial support from her brother and Metod himself. Metod later moved into this homestead with his first wife, where he remained until 1978. For a brief period of time, Trobec moved to another homestead in Spodnja Bela, but eventually returned to Dolenja Vas.

His mother eventually sold the homestead in 1978 or the summer of 1979 to a lodger who only cared about the upper floor and did not use the rooms on the first floor. Once the new owner learned what had been going on in there, he wanted to return the house and get his money back, prompting an angry response from Trobec, who wrote to his lawyer and demanded that the letter be read in court.

== Crimes and offenses ==
From 1967 to 1979, Trobec was linked to six different crimes and successfully prosecuted for four of them. Additional charges for other crimes were also brought forward at his first murder trial:

- 1967: aiding and abetting in the theft of a bicycle and moped.
- 1971: auto theft, for which he was put on one month probation.
- 1974: one-year imprisonment for fraud and false accusations stemming from an incident in which he hid a car he had rented from West Germany at an outbuilding in Dolenja Vas and then reported the theft to the authorities in Kranj to collect a reward.
- 1976: accused of stealing electricity, but not convicted.
- March 25, 1977: shortly after murdering Marjana Cankar, he used her key to rob a crafting cooperative in Ljubljana. Trobec stole from them two calculators, two typewriters, an electric cooker, coffee-making accessories and two paper clips, with the stolen items' total value being at 21,499 dinars.
- 1978: 3 months imprisonment for poaching, but the sentence was suspended at his request.
- February 5, 1979: while driving near the Kranj bus station, Trobec offered a ride to pensioner Janez Valančič, who had just missed the bus. He then drove to a meadow in Dorfarje, knocked Valančič down to the ground and tore off his watch, as the elderly man had no money on him.
- July 2, 1979: pretending to be a taxi driver, he offered a ride to the elderly pensioner Jovanka K., who wanted to visit Planina to see her daughter. He drove her towards Srakovlje and threw her out of the car without her luggage, documents and money.

=== Stay in medical institutions ===
In 1974, Trobec was taken from the remand prison (where he was held on fraud and false accusation charges) for treatment at a psychiatric clinic in Ljubljana. Psychiatric evaluations determined that he had psychosis, Ganser syndrome and a psychopathic personality by pretending to be a mental patient. During the two occasions he was detained there, Trobec underwent electroconvulsive therapy - in the first instance, he was given only three shocks, and during the second - two. He reportedly threatened to kill his mother during a visit, but she would later downplay the incident and claim that they had argued about work on the farm.

From February 20 to April 8, 1980, Trobec was put under special supervision at a hospital in Zagreb, SR Croatia, which confirmed that he was aware of his actions. He also underwent electroconvulsive therapy there, as he refused to cooperate with hospital staff.

== Murders ==
=== Modus operandi ===
Trobec's modus operandi consisted of bringing out unfamiliar women to his homestead, where he raped and strangled them, severely beating two of his victims until they were bleeding. After killing them, he would shove their corpses into a masonry oven and then set them alight with gasoline and firewood, later throwing out the ashes and remaining human bones in a wooden urn or a nearby septic tank. The victims' personal items and documents were either also burned, or brought to the homestead in Spodnja Bela. Investigators were unable to determine the exact reason why Trobec did not kill every woman he brought with him, but some speculated that he only targeted victims with health problems, as two of his victims had epilepsy.

Despite this, officers investigating the homestead after his capture found patches of blood in several locations. In addition to this, they also found a novel named "X-100", which describes cruel murders and burning corpses, and another novel named Lun in Ekskadus, where they noted that Trobec had marked one sentence in bold - "I give all my secrets to the fire" (Croatian: Sve tajne predajem vatri). During interrogations, Trobec gave three different accounts of what supposedly had transpired, initially claiming that the women were brought to him and then murdered by strangers. Later on, he claimed that he had given the victims some pills and that he participated in the murders, before ultimately admitting that he strangled them during intercourse and that he burned the bodies in the oven. Contrary to what his defense attorneys would claim, he never stated that his victims died of natural causes.

The manner of death attributed to the victims - suffocation - could not be proven with certainty at either of Trobec's trials. In the second trial, forensic experts were also unable to determine whether the murders took place during intimate intercourse or rape.

=== Chronology of murders ===
In the spring of 1976, Trobec met 18-year-old Vida Markovčič, a retailer's apprentice, at a bar in Ljubljana. He offered to take her on a ride with his motorcycle and drove to the homestead, where he severely beat, raped and strangled her. Her white flip-flops, a piece of her dress, identification documents and a photograph were later found in Trobec's homestead.

On March 25, 1977, Trobec met 53-year-old pensioner and part-time cleaner Marjana Cankar at a Nama department store in Ljubljana. It is unclear what exactly transpired between the two, but it is presumed that she was raped and killed at the homestead in Dolenja Vas sometime that same day or the day after. Her coat and a burnt gold chain with a heart were later found there, while other personal items were found at the homestead in Spodnja Bela. Trobec would later use a key she had to rob a crafting cooperative she used to work at.

On March 20, 1978, 21-year-old Urška Brečko, a bartender at an inn in Črnivec, went missing near the Ljubljana Train Station while out on an errand for her mother. (Note: Some sources say that it was to pick her mother's dress and arrange a financial issue with neighbors regarding her mother's pension. Others said that she had gone to arrange the purchase of a vineyard.) After failing to appear at work the following day, her mother reported her missing to the police station in Sevnica. Both authorities and concerned citizens began a large-scale search for her near the Sava river, in Okroglice and even abroad, but were unable to find anything. It would later emerge that she had been picked up by Trobec at the train station and driven back to the homestead in Dolenja Vas, where he killed her. Her keys to the back door, to the inn's hallway and to the closet in her room would later be found at the crime scene.

The fourth victim, 43-year-old alcoholic laborer Ana Plevnik, went missing sometime in the spring of 1978 after meeting Trobec at the Daj-Dam restaurant in Ljubljana. Little is known about her case, but it is said that she was killed shortly after Brečko. Some of her personal items were found after the Trobecs sold the homestead in Dolenja Vas, while her clothes were later found hidden away in Spodnja Bela.

The final victim, 33-year-old housekeeper Zorica Nikolić, went missing on November 17, 1978, while on her way to see the doctor. Unlike previous victims, she was an acquaintance of Trobec, as the two of them had worked together at the Metalka manufacturing company in Ljubljana. Investigators would find the key to her apartment in Štepanjsko naselje where she lived with her sister, and her fur-trimmed coat was found in the possession of Trobec's sister, who lived in Kranj. Her mandible, found among the ashes of the masonry oven, was identified by a forensic dental expert as belonging to Nikolić after comparing the teeth to her dental records.

== Arrest and discovery of remains ==
At the end of July 1979, Trobec met a German tourist named Hermann Lampenau in Medno, while the latter was searching for a place to stay. Under the pretence of going to visit his sister, Trobec drove off with the man's car. Lampenau reported the theft to the authorities, but went to search for him on his own and eventually found him again on August 5 at the bus station in Kranj. Trobec promised that he would give him the car back and a place to stay, then drove Lampenau towards a forest near Preddvor. There he beat him up and stole his wallet, which contained 200 Deutsche Mark, 1,900 dinars and his ID. Lampenau had his clavicle broken and suffered wounds to his forehead.

The attack was witnessed by a mushroom hunter, Pavle Arsenovski, who dragged Lampenau to a nearby phone booth and called the police. (Note: Details about what exactly he reported are unclear. Some sources claim Arsenovski managed to memorize the car Trobec was driving, while others say that Lampenau had memorized the registration number.) A few hours later, Trobec was stopped in Kranj by armed militiamen and transferred to a prison in Radovljica. After he was arrested, the militiamen went to investigate his home in Spodnja Bela, where they found a plethora of various items Trobec had stolen from the Metalka warehouse in Ljubljana, where he had been working since June 1977. It was determined that he spent had faked staying in the hospital and managed to sneak in the stolen items without the doorman noticing, which he later sold or gave to colleagues as a sort of bribe to keep them silent. A total of 130 different objects were found, amounting to 128,000 dinars. Most concerning out of the discoveries were bloodstained women's clothing, photos of which were taken and published in the newspapers.

Acquaintances of Trobec then directed the authorities to his house in Dolenja Vas, where they found burned human remains, clothing and identity papers. The officers suspected that the bodies belonged to Cankar, Plevnik and Nikolić, since their items were there, but were initially unsure whether Trobec had killed them. A few months later, they linked the cases of Markovčič and Brečko after finding their remains in a manure pit near a barn, as well as numerous articles of clothing, metal clothespins and gold chains with pendants, shoes, handbags, umbrellas and cosmetic products. These objects were shown to relatives and acquaintances of the victims, and all of them were positively identified as belonging to the missing women.

== Trials ==
=== Robbery trial ===
On September 8, 1980, the five-member panel of the Kranj Regional Court sentenced Metod Trobec to eight years imprisonment for the attack on Lampenau. Trobec told the president of the panel that he could not remember anything and that he had changed after undergoing the electroshock therapy in 1974. This claim was rejected by forensic expert Zlatko Vinek, who pointed out that Trobec had previously been diagnosed as a psychopath after multiple tests were conducted by Vinek and two colleagues. They were able to confirm that he was sane and aware of his actions, and that he showed skill and forethought when he attacked Lampenau.

=== Robbery and murder trial ===
On October 30, 1980, Trobec appeared before the Kranj Regional Court to stand trial for the five murders. At trial, he walked back on his previous confessions and claimed that he had been unable to think straight up until two or three years ago. Trobec then complained of a duodenal ulcer and issues with his kidneys, due to which his attorney requested that his medical records be reviewed. In addition to this, the attorney also mentioned that Trobec's half-brother on his father's side - diagnosed with schizophrenia - died of a heart attack in 1949.

==== Events during robbery trial ====
On the following day, Trobec waived his defense and stopped answering questions, which the senate president warned would just make his defense team's job more difficult. The judge then started reading out the indictments, starting with the assault and robbery on Janez Valančič. Trobec claimed that he had accepted to drive the pensioner to Dorfar and Valančič had given him his identity card, but not his watch, as it reminded him of his previous job at LTH. When Valančič got out, Trobec knocked him to the ground and stole the man's watch, which was later found in Spodnja Bela. Trobec claimed that he had bought the watch from a man in Ljubljana, but his explanation was not taken seriously.

The judge then read out the remaining indictments concerning robberies and thefts, which included the attack on Jovanka K., to which Trobec simply remarked that "not everything was a sunshine" in his life.

==== Events during murder trial ====
On November 3, witnesses came forward in connection to the murders. Franc Plankl, the administrator at the prison in Radovljica, claimed that Trobec had started threatening guards and fellow inmates when the investigation expanded to the murders. He also noted the poaching conviction from the mid-1970s, noting that hunting trophies and newsprints with dried drops of animal blood were found with him. When asked if they wanted to testify, Trobec's siblings opted to remain silent.

On the sixth day of the trial, November 6, a pensioner named Franc Prajs was called to the stand, as he was the one whose house Nikolić was cleaning at the time. According to him, she had told him that she was dating a murderer, and upon hearing this, Trobec became angry and got up from the dock, shouting that he had been unfairly labelled a criminal and that his mother had raised him to a decent, hard-working man. He continued his rant, explaining that he had to flee abroad due to the accusation of arson, and reminded the court of his treatment at the mental institution, claiming that he was genuinely sorry if he had done anything wrong. Trobec's lawyer requested that the medical information of Nikolić and Cankar be presented, arguing that both could have died from alcohol poisoning during an epileptic fit.

On November 7, the last witness - Plevnik's son - was called in to testify. Trobec's first wife also appeared at the hearing, which was closed to the public.

On November 10, the three psychiatrists (Zlatko Vinek, Vanoš Bregan, and Ivan Košuljandić) informed the court that Trobec was not mentally ill, that he was aware of his actions and that the electroconvulsive therapy had no noticeable effect on his mental faculties. Vinek reiterated that Trobec was a psychopath, not a mental patient and that his silence simply indicated that he wanted to hide the truth. When questioned on the ethics of who gets to decide which patient gets shock treatment or not, Košuljandić replied that this issue was not yet resolved on moral grounds.

On November 11, three medical experts (Tomaž Jančigaj from the Institute of Forensic Medicine in Ljubljana; Štefan Stražiščar and Zvonimir Žajdela, a dentist from the Clinic for Maxillofacial Surgery in Ljubljana) explained that they identified evidence of human remains and blood that belonged to at least five women, none of which belonged to Trobec's blood type - O. They also stated that only Nikolić could be identified from remains alone, as her teeth were preserved well enough to identify her via dental records. The only thing none of them were able to determine was how exactly the women had died, as their bones had been burned too badly.

On November 13, the defense summoned 59-year-old Marija Trobec to the stand, her being the only close relative to testify. She described in detail the difficult life on the family farm and how she had bought the homestead in Dolenja Vas with financial help from her brother and Metod himself. Marija said she lived in Rovt, where she was supposedly taking care of her disabled sister-in-law, and allowed her son to live by himself in Dolenja Vas and later the homestead in Spodnja Bela. Because her statements differed from what she had told investigators, the President of the Senate asked whether she had consulted with a lawyer, to which she replied in the negative. At her request, the defense attorney read out letters written from Metod to his family members, and at the end of her testimony, she asked him whether it was bad if she had come, to which he instinctively replied no.

On November 18, the twelfth day of the hearing, the defense attorney requested that his client be granted the status of a mentally unsound individual. This request was contradicted by the testimony of Nikola Peršić from the School of Medicine in Zagreb, who reiterated his expert opinion that Trobec was not mentally ill and had no damaged chromosomes to indicate he had schizophrenia. As a result, the court rejected a proposal for two new psychiatrists - Lev Milčinski and Maksim Šternič - to be appointed. Peršić continued to deny that Trobec had any mental abnormalities, causing him to get into a verbal argument with Trobec's lawyer and forcing the judges to intervene. The defense attorney then continued on, claiming that his client had received five electroshocks with 220 volts, contrary to a medical record from Polje, which recorded only 110 volts. After the hearing, Trobec got angry and said he was going to sue the psychiatrists who ruined his life.

The final day of the hearing was on November 20, when both the prosecution and the defense gave their closing speeches. The prosecutor demanded that Trobec be sentenced to death, pointing out that one of the novels found in his homestead was circumstantial evidence that he had burned the victims' bodies in the oven. After a three-hour speech, Trobec's lawyer demanded that his client be acquitted, claiming that he was an innocent man whose health had been destroyed and that the real killers were still out there. He gave different theories on what had happened to each respective victim - Markovčič had died from a drug overdose; Cankar from an epileptic fit; Brečko had choked on food during a passionate embrace with Trobec; Plevnik died in a state of delirium and that Nikolič cut her own veins because her boyfriend had left her. In this version of events, the lawyer claimed that Trobec supposedly burned the bodies in a panic and did not confess because he was afraid of being sent to prison. The prosecutor then pointed out that this could not reasonably be the case, as Trobec himself never claimed that the deaths had occurred naturally and that he had shown he was prone to violence on multiple other occasions.

==== Death sentence and overturning ====
Trobec was convicted on all counts on November 25, 1980, and sentenced to death by the five-member panel for the murders and to a total of eleven years imprisonment on the other charges. He remained calm when the death sentence was read out, but was visibly displeased when the court ordered that he must multiple hefty fines for court services and the various crimes he had committed.

After his initial appeals were rejected, Trobec's sentence was eventually overturned by the Supreme Court, as it was judged that insufficient attention had been brought to the hereditary presence of schizophrenia and mental illness in his family. As a result, a new trial was ordered to take place.

=== Second murder trial ===
At the first hearing, on September 2, 1982, Trobec's lawyers requested new defense attorneys and protested against the new composition of the senate. When Trobec was interrogated, he claimed that he did not remember if he had really killed the women, that he occasionally drank alone in excess and supposedly suffered from frequent headaches due to the electroshocks he was given during his medical treatment. When presented with photos of the victims, he only recognized Ana Plevnik.

On September 6, the first witnesses were brought forward, Markovčič and Brečko's family members. Prosecutors also questioned a bus driver who had brought Brečko to the place from where she had initially disappeared. Trobec himself claimed that he had met a young girl who had just missed the bus or train at an inn in Ljubljana. On the following day, two of Brečko's acquaintances said that she avoided men and did not have a boyfriend. Additional attention was paid to the fact that her keys were found in Trobec's possession.

The hearing which took place on September 9 was closed to the public. Trobec's first ex-wife attended and testified, but the second did not. Trobec's lawyer remarked that the public should know that sexual acts occurred between his client and the victim. On the following day, morphologist Štefan Stražiščar from the Institute of Forensic Medicine in Ljubljana repeated his testimony from the first trial, saying that the ashes found in the oven contained the bones of five adults and that he could not determine the exact cause of death. The next witness to testify was Janez Rojšek, who described in detail Trobec's personality disorder, feelings of inadequacy and inability to hold proper relationships with women as the main reason why the murders occurred.

On September 13 and 14, five forensic psychiatrists (Marko Škulj, Janez Romih, and Avšeč from the Refugee Hospital for Psychiatry, and Karla Pospišil-Zavrski and Rudolf Turčin from Zagreb) testified at trial regarding Trobec's sexual deviancy. All of them stated that he was neither mentally ill nor incapable of understanding the gravity of his actions, but was likely under the influence of alcohol when he killed his victims. Defense attorneys also requested that a pharmacologist and female doctors who treated patients at Polje to appear, which the court panel denied.

After a one-day recess, the trial resumed on September 16. A defectologist from the Malča Beličeva Home was unable to recognize Markovčič's clothes. On September 20, the prosecution and defense made their closing arguments. Trobec's defense attorney requested that the court hear the testimony of three additional witnesses, but the court rejected his request. On the other hand, the prosecutor again requested the death penalty, stating that Brečko and Markovčič were definitely among the victims, as Trobec had described them before they were known as potential victims. The defense resumed their arguments on the following day, agreeing with the conclusions of the psychologist, but not of the psychiatrists. He doubted that the skeletons really belonged to the victims and that they had actually died a violent death, and suggested that her client should be exonerated.

On September 24, 1982, Trobec was found guilty on all counts and sentenced to death. In its explanation, the senate explained in detail how it was convinced that he had killed Brečko and Markovčič, and that they agreed with the conclusions of the psychiatrists that Trobec was egoistic, deviant, prone to alcoholism, aggressive and with an anomalous sexual drive. As such, they concluded that he was likely to continue offending if he was ever released and would likely pose a danger to those around him. While the verdict was read out, Trobec remained silent.

The following year, Trobec's lawyer submitted an appeal to the High Court of Ljubljana. After reviewing the arguments for a commutation of the death sentence, the Court agreed and re-sentenced Trobec to twenty years imprisonment on the grounds of diminished responsibility.

== Imprisonment ==
=== New findings and possible additional victim ===
In July 1984, excavators examining Trobec's homestead in Dolenja Vas found additional documents belonging to Markovčič, but when they examined a hollowed-out brick wall, they found the ID and health card of an unfamiliar woman. Upon examination, it was discovered that they belonged to 45-year-old Olga Pajić, who had disappeared on August 9, 1975, while on sick leave and supposedly had gone to Ljubljana to buy shoes for her husband. She never returned, and was reported missing two months later. When he was shown the documents, Trobec claimed that he knew Pajić and that he had stolen her documents after he killed her during a fight. Like the other victims, he then burned her remains in the oven. According to him, she was his first victim, not Markovčič, and he used this opportunity to deny killing Brečko. A murder indictment was issued to the Prosecutor's Office in Ljubljana, but for reasons unknown, Trobec was never put on trial for this alleged murder.

=== Prison assaults ===
==== 1988 and 1990 incidents ====
Following his conviction, Trobec was transferred to the Dob pri Mirni Correctional Facility in Slovenska Vas. During his stay there, he got into a confrontation with inmate Vinko N., who was temporarily transferred to another prison in Ljubljana. Vinko N. wrote several requests not to be returned to Dob pri Mirni, but was moved there against his will in early May 1988. On May 23, while talking with a group of inmates, Trobec - who had just been released from solitary confinement - came up behind him and stabbed him twice in the chest and the right side of the abdomen with a 7.5 cm long shank. After stabbing Vinko N., Trobec handed the knife over to the approaching guard and said it had snapped. On January 30, 1990, while he was on leave in a special ward where convicts could move to other rooms, Trobec stabbed Zlatko K. in the right leg with a 7.6 long pocket knife, inflicting a 1 cm deep and 2 cm long cut.

==== 1992 incident ====
On August 28, 1992, during a prisoners' walk, Trobec stabbed inmate Miloš Nemec with a sharpened cutlery knife seven times in the chest and three times in the limbs. The supposed motivation was an old grudge between the two men. Trobec was put in solitary confinement and was defended by two guards with a dog from the enraged prisoners. He was then moved to another prison in Novo Mesto, where guards soon found a note detailing an escape plan involving the attack on a certain guard and using his keys to free fellow prisoners who were aware of the plan. Tear gas was also found in the cell.

Trobec was unpopular with other inmates and a loner, and after his attack on Nemec, other inmates protested to the Minister of Justice Miha Kozinc, demanding separate housing for problematic prisoners and smaller accommodation facilities. Kozinc promised that he would propose to the assembly to allocate more money for this. Soon after, Trobec was temporarily moved to a prison in Maribor, considered one of the safest in the country, due to the increasingly violent threats against him from fellow inmates. During his stay there, he was ordered to live and walk separately from others and was prohibited from participating in work that involved other inmates. As he was a flight risk, he was put under strict surveillance. Trobec was eventually returned to Dob pri Mirni in September 1993.

==== Assault trial and extension of sentence ====
At the beginning of 1993, the Novo Mesto District Court sentenced Trobec to 10 years and 6 months imprisonment for attempted murder and causing minor bodily harm for the 1988 and 1990 stabbings. He did not defend himself and remained silent throughout the proceedings. The court decided that this should be considered a separate sentence, and on February 25 of that year, the High Court of Ljubljana rejected an appeal from Trobec's lawyer. The Supreme Court refused to review the judgment, allowing Trobec's already-existing sentence to be extended.

At the end of March 1998, Trobec was tried at the Novo Mesto District Court for the attack on Miloš Nemec in 1992. While he did not attend the first hearing, Nemec appeared on April 23 and described what had happened - according to his testimony, Trobec wanted to force him into buying some overpriced canned food, and became resentful when he was ignored. This claim was backed up by other prisoners and prison guards working at Dob pri Mirni. Dušan Žagar, a neuropsychologist, then presented his medical report on Trobec, describing him as a labile, aggressive, tense, suspicious and aggressive inmate who had a personality disorder. Staff at the prison also showed documentation that indicated that while he was predominantly calm during his first years in prison, Trobec started to cause trouble after 1986 and had to be disciplined on at least 15 occasions for insulting, slandering and attacking prison officials and fellow inmates. This, combined with his botched escape attempt and previous conviction for attempted murder, resulted in a total of 15 years imprisonment being added to his already existing 20-year sentence.

Trobec's defense counsel then filed an appeal regarding the change of the court psychiatrist, who said at the main hearing that Trobec had minor mental impairments. The High Court of Ljubljana overturned the verdict on the grounds that it was still unclear whether the accused was fully cognizant of what he had done, and the fact that the psychiatrist's oral opinion differed from the written one.

On March 3, 2000, Trobec's retrial began. When offered a chance to speak, Trobec claimed that a guard had allegedly given him a letter from Miloš Nemec, in which Nemec supposedly threatened to kill him while Tronbec was under the influence of alcohol and sedatives. These claims were rejected by the prison staff and psychiatrists, who pointed out that Trobec was never given alcohol and was fully sober when he attacked the other inmate. Slavko Ziherl, an expert in the field of psychiatry, stated that Trobec is a paranoid, dissocial and narcissistic individual who showed signs of mild brain damage, possibly due to his upbringing. Nevertheless, he reiterated that he was fully aware of what he was doing. As a result, all of Trobec's subsequent appeals were rejected and his 15-year sentence was upheld. In March 2001, he was moved to a prison in Koper.

=== Lawsuit against Lea Eva Müller ===
On March 29, 2000, animal rights activist Lea Eva Müller gave an interview on 24UR, giving vivid descriptions of Trobec's supposed torture of animals at a young age. When he learned of this, Trobec sued her for 18.5 million tolars for defamation and slander. Müller said that her source for these claims was Barbara Juvan (or Jovan), the president of the Domžale Society Against Animal Cruelty, who had read an article from Jana Magazine from April 1988 which supposedly claimed that Trobec's mother and sister had seen him torture animals. Juvan later said that she did not remember, but that it was possible she might have said this. In subsequent interviews, Müller alleged that people who had supposedly testified at Trobec's murder trial also claimed this was true, and that Trobec himself continuously harassed her by calling her on the phone and sending letters until he was eventually prevented from doing so. At the trial, her defense counsel presented articles from two newspapers - Slovenske novice and Nedeljski dnevnik - which claimed that Trobec's ex-wife supposedly corroborated these claims. In the end, Trobec himself withdrew the lawsuit and all charges against Müller were dropped.

== Suicide ==
During the mid-2000s, Trobec suffered a lot of personal grief, as his sister stopped visiting due to a supposed illness and his elderly mother died in a care home in Preddvor in March 2006. In addition to this, he refused to undergo any medical examinations, which the prison medical service deemed necessary, as they suspected he could possibly have prostate cancer. He also attempted suicide on at least one occasion, but was unsuccessful.

At 4 o'clock in the morning of May 30, 2006, some inmates were awakened by the sound of clattering coming from Trobec's cell in Dob pri Mirni, but none of them informed the guards. Two hours later, prison guards went to solitary confinement to deliver food to Trobec, only to find that the door had been blocked by something heavy. After eventually forcing it open, they found Trobec's body next to the uprooted toilet bowl. An autopsy determined that he had hanged himself with a sheet tied to the handle of a water valve. He left no suicide note, but it was assumed that his possible cancer diagnosis and recent tragedies caused him to take his life. His body was then buried in an unmarked grave in Šentrupert cemetery.

If he had served out his sentence in full, Trobec would have been eligible for release on March 5 or 15, 2015.

=== Demolition of the homestead ===
In 2011, Špela Sotlar, best known as a participant in the first season of the Slovenian reality show Kmetija, bought Trobec's old homestead while looking for some property in the countryside. The purchase was made with the help of his lawyer, who was reportedly obliged to sell the residence.

== Image of Trobec in Slovene society ==
=== Acquaintances ===
Miha Čelar, director of the documentary Mama je ena sama (2015), knew a car mechanic who was called Trobec and had a workshop near his block when he was a child. As a business gift for the New Year, he printed a calendar with caricatures and anagrams for Trobec's surname. The January paper featured a caricature of Trobec and the inscription "If a girl has a running mouth call the Trobec service!" (Slovene: Če baba ima dolg gobec, pokliči servis Trobec!)

=== Philosophers and intellectuals ===
Several prominent philosophers have commented on the Trobec case. Blaž Ogorevc described him as the "Patriarch of Slovenian sexual derailments", while Slavoj Žižek said that his actions were a "dark side of Cankarian loyalty" to his mother. Journalist and film critic Marcel Štefančič wrote in his book Slovenci (2010) that Trobec and Silvo Plut were "sacrificed" for the retouching of Slovenian self-image. He wrote extensively about Trobec's psyche, making frequent allegories to contemporary cultural and philosophical issues. Literary critic and essayist Matevž Kos criticized Štefančič's approach to the subject, saying that he had hypocritical views on the criminal's morality and his views on subjects such as the Barbara Pit massacre.

Lawyer Dragan Petrovec noted that one of the judges fear of Trobec being possibly freed seemed unreasonable and exaggerated, as by that time he was too old, frail and infamous to cause any serious harm.

=== In politics and culture ===
In 1999, when a bipartisan committee of the SKD and SLS wrote of their approval to rename a primary school in Škofja Loka after teacher and politician Ivan Dolenec, historian Jože Dežman wrote in a column in Gorenjski glas that to him, this was as if they had chosen to rename it to the 'Metod Trobec School'. One of the readers replied that this was very dishonorable for a historian and foreign to historical science. Aside from this, Dežman suggested that Trobec possibly could have been inspired by the actions of the Narodnoosvobodilni boj partisans in concentration camps, where women were also abused.

On February 26, 2005, politician Matjaž Hanžek told an anecdote involving Trobec on Radiotelevizija Slovenija which was considered inappropriate, as he was a human rights ombudsman at the time. He later apologized for it, and multiple people involved in the political sphere - Eva Irgl, Milenko Ziherl, Branko Grims, Matej Makarovič and others - condemned him for saying it. Zmago Jelinčič Plemeniti, leader of the Slovenian National Party and a member of the National Assembly at the time, even called for the Supreme Court Prosecutor's Office to indict him on criminal charges, which never occurred.

In 2007, Justin Stanovnik, in the 66th issue of Zaveza, the journal of the Nova slovenska zaveza, accused Tine Hribar of comparing the burials of Trobec and Plut to the post-war massacre committed by the Slovene Home Guard.

In 2012, when a vote was being held on whether to implement changes to the Slovenian Family Code, former athlete and blogger Roman Vodeb wrote that fatherless children were at a higher risk of becoming serial killers and torturing their own children, citing Trobec and Jozef Fritzl as examples.

In 2014, ex-president Janez Janša delivered a speech in which he reflected on how his opponents have not stopped their attempts to discredit him after all these years. In one paragraph, he wrote about how he remembered serving a prison sentence in Dob pri Mirni 25 years earlier and living near Trobec's cell.

When journalist Blaž Zgaga received the Deutsche Welle award for freedom of speech for his coverage of the coronavirus pandemic in 2020, Branko Grims wrote on Twitter that this was similar to awarding the women's rights award to Metod Trobec.

== In the media and culture ==
=== Cinema ===
In 2018, film director Tomaž Gorkič produced a short horror film on the case, titled "Metod". He has stated that he is currently developing a feature film. Filmmaker and screenwriter Igor Šterk has stated that he is developing his own full-length drama film about Trobec.

=== Music ===
- The Croatian alternative rock band Trobecove krušne peći (Trobec's bread ovens), which worked during the eighties, was named after him.

=== Accolades ===
The Slovenian edition of Playboy included Metod Trobec in its 2007 issue, placing him in 15th place and awarding him the "Departure of the Year", as a humorous nod to his suicide. Silvo Plut was chosen to be the runner-up for this award as well.

== See also ==
- Silvo Plut
- List of serial killers by country
