= Silvo Plut =

Slovenian serial killer

- Born: 29 May 1968; Novo Mesto, Socialist Republic of Slovenia, Socialist Federal Republic of Yugoslavia
- Died: April 28, 2007 (aged 38); Ljubljana, Slovenia

Details
- Victims: 3
- Span of crimes: 1990–2006
- Country: Slovenia; Serbia

Silvo Plut (29 May 1968 – 28 April 2007) was a Slovenian serial killer. He was sentenced to 30 years in prison for the murder of Ljubica Ulčar and the attempted murder of her husband Miro Ulčar on 24 February 2006. Plut had been released on probation after 13 years in prison for the 1990 rape and murder of a former schoolmate, Marjanca Matjašič. He killed himself in his prison cell on 28 April 2007.

== Crimes ==
Plut killed his first victim, Marjanca Matjašič, on 16 February 1990, in Slovenia. He was sentenced to 15 years in prison. In 2003, he was released on parole.

He killed his second victim, 25-year-old Jasmina Đošić, on 18 November 2004, in Aleksinac, Serbia. He escaped to Slovenia, which refused extradition in spite of a warrant from Serbia.

Plut killed his third victim, Ljubica Ulčar, 25, on 24 February 2006, also wounding her husband Miro Ulčar.

On 2 October 2006, a Ljubljana court sentenced him to 30 years in prison for killing Ulčar. On 26 April 2007, a court in Niš, Serbia sentenced him in absentia to 40 years in prison for killing Đošić.

He killed himself in his Ljubljana prison cell on 28 April 2007, by overdosing on sleeping pills.

== See also ==
- Metod Trobec
- List of serial killers by country
