= Peričnik Falls =

Waterfall in Slovenia

Coordinates: 46°6′24.68″N 13°51′11.53″E

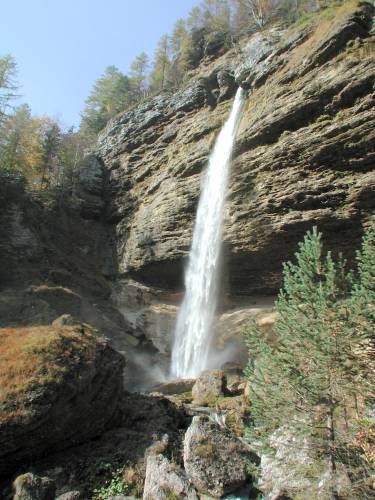
Peričnik Falls in the summer

Peričnik Falls (pronounced [pɛˈɾiːtʃnik]; Slovene: slap Peričnik) is a waterfall in Triglav National Park, Slovenia. The waterfall consists of two distinct cascades: the 16-metre Upper Peričnik Falls and the more dramatic 52-metre Lower Peričnik Falls, with both heights recently confirmed through precise geodetic measurements. A notable feature is the ability to walk behind the curtain of the lower waterfall, making it one of the most photographed natural attractions in the Julian Alps. The falls were first made accessible to visitors in 1895, when the local priest and mountaineer Jakob Aljaž cleared debris and constructed the initial footpath.

== Name ==
The name Peričnik (in the local dialect also Perečnik) is ultimately derived from the verb prati, which originally meant 'to strike, beat'. It also refers to water falling over a steep cliff (cf. also Peračica), and in standard Slovene has also developed into the sense 'to wash clothing' (via the sense 'to beat laundry').

== Description ==
Peričnik Falls is one of the best-known waterfalls in Slovenia. It flows from a hanging valley in Triglav National Park into the glacial Vrata Valley, where the water of Peričnik Creek then flows into Bistrica Creek. There are actually two waterfalls: Upper Peričnik Falls (Slovene: Zgornji Peričnik, 16 meters or 52 feet high) and Lower Peričnik Falls (Slovene: Spodnji Peričnik, 52 meters or 171 feet high).

Peričnik Falls is a tiered waterfall on Peričnik Creek in the upper Vrata Valley, just above the alpine settlement of Mojstrana in northwestern Slovenia. The creek springs from a scree slope beneath the Peričnik screes (Peričnikove melmi) and descends the valley flank before plunging over a prominent cliff of Pleistocene conglomerate rock. The two principal drops, Lower and Upper Peričnik Falls, are separated by about 40 m of steep talus. A dramatic overhang behind the lower cascade allows visitors to walk behind the curtain of water, a feature that has made the site one of the most photographed natural attractions in the Julian Alps. Popular guidebooks long repeated heights of 52 m for the lower falls and 16 m for the upper falls; however, a 2018–19 geodetic campaign measured the drops at 49.13 m and 15.37 m, respectively, by combining Global Navigation Satellite System (GNSS) observations with terrestrial laser measurements and least-squares adjustment of an eight-point control network.

== Formation, history, and measurement ==
During the Pleistocene glaciations, the Vrata Valley was repeatedly filled by ice, which deepened and widened the trough. When the glaciers retreated, Peričnik Creek was left hanging high above the valley floor and began eroding the cliff, exploiting variations in the hardness of individual conglomerate layers. Softer strata behind the upper lip were removed more quickly, eventually splitting the original single fall into the present upper and lower drops. Erosional grooves marking former flow paths are still visible in the cliff face, and an abandoned channel sealed with concrete in 1935 reactivates during spates.

The local priest and mountaineer Jakob Aljaž cleared storm debris from the creek in 1895, built the first footpath to the falls, and determined the height of the lower drop by lowering a weighted rope—then the usual but hazardous method for such work—obtaining a figure of roughly 50 m. More than a century later, Kokalj's survey team installed a precise geodetic control network around the falls and remeasured the drops with reflector-less electronic distance measurement and global navigation satellite system positioning. Their results deviated by less than ±0.02 m between independent observations, demonstrating the reliability of modern surveying techniques for determining waterfall heights. A complementary analysis of publicly available airborne-LiDAR data produced a slightly higher value (50.48 m) for the lower cascade, an offset attributed to the difficulty of defining exact crest and plunge-pool points in a noisy water surface point cloud.

Although most visitors focus on the two main drops, the keeper of the Peričnik Lodge (Slovene: Koča pri Peričniku) reports a small third cascade just downstream from the lower falls. The area around Peričnik Falls lies within the eastern sector of Triglav National Park, and the maintained trail from the valley floor to the viewing platform—first laid out by Aljaž and periodically upgraded—remains the safest route for sightseers.

== See also ==
- List of waterfalls
