= Dolenja Vas pri Polhovem Gradcu =

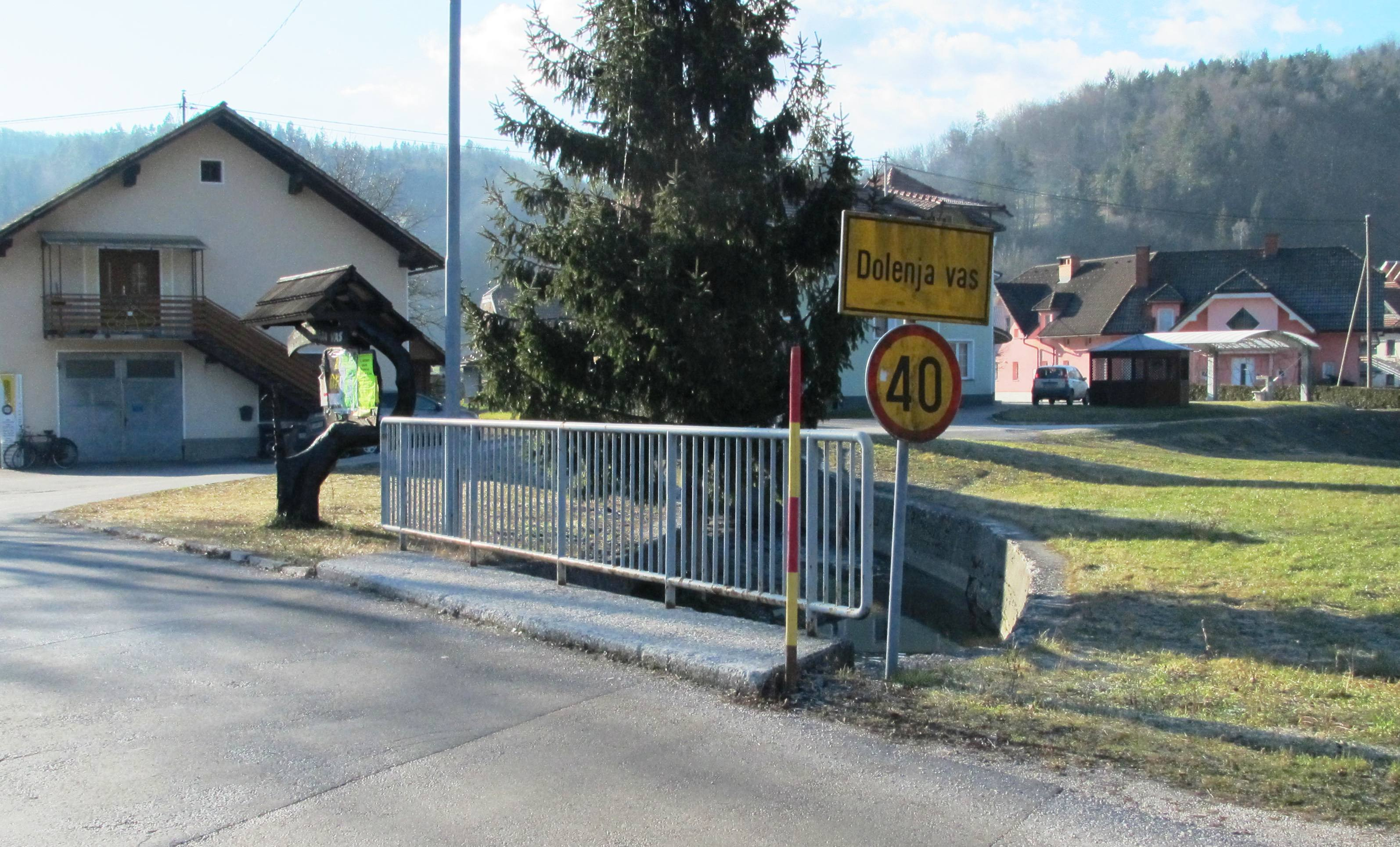

- Location in Slovenia
- Coordinates: 46°3′33.81″N 14°20′34.01″E
- Country: Slovenia
- Traditional region: Upper Carniola
- Statistical region: Central Slovenia
- Municipality: Dobrova–Polhov Gradec

Area
  - Total: 5.63 km^{2} (2.17 sq mi)
- Elevation: 344.5 m (1,130 ft)

Population (2020)
  - Total: 245
  - Density: 43.5/km^{2} (113/sq mi)

Dolenja Vas pri Polhovem Gradcu (pronounced [dɔˈleːnja ˈʋaːs pɾi ˈpou̯ːxoʋɛm ˈɡɾaːtsu]; Slovene: Dolenja vas pri Polhovem Gradcu, German: Niederdorf) is a small village east of Polhov Gradec in the Municipality of Dobrova–Polhov Gradec in the Upper Carniola region of Slovenia.

== Name ==
The name of the settlement was changed from Dolenja vas to Dolenja vas pri Polhovem Gradcu in 1955. Dolenja vas pri Polhovem Gradcu literally means 'lower village near Polhov Gradec'. Dolenja vas and names like it are quite common in Slovenia and other Slavic countries, and they indicate that the settlement lay at a lower elevation than nearby settlements. In the past it was known as Niederdorf in German.

== Cultural heritage ==
The barnhouse at Dolenja Vas pri Polhovem Gradcu no. 6 is a two-story rectangular structure combining a residential part and a barn under a single roof. The year 1811 is carved into the semicircular door casing around the entrance. At a later date an addition was put on the structure, it was modified, and the plastering on the facade was segmented. The house stands on the road from Babna Gora.

== Notable people ==
Notable people that were born or lived in Dolenja Vas pri Polhovem Gradcu include:

- John Seliškar (1871–1932), professor at the St. Paul Seminary and author of a work on Francis Xavier Pierz
- Metod Trobec (1948–2006), serial killer

== Gallery ==
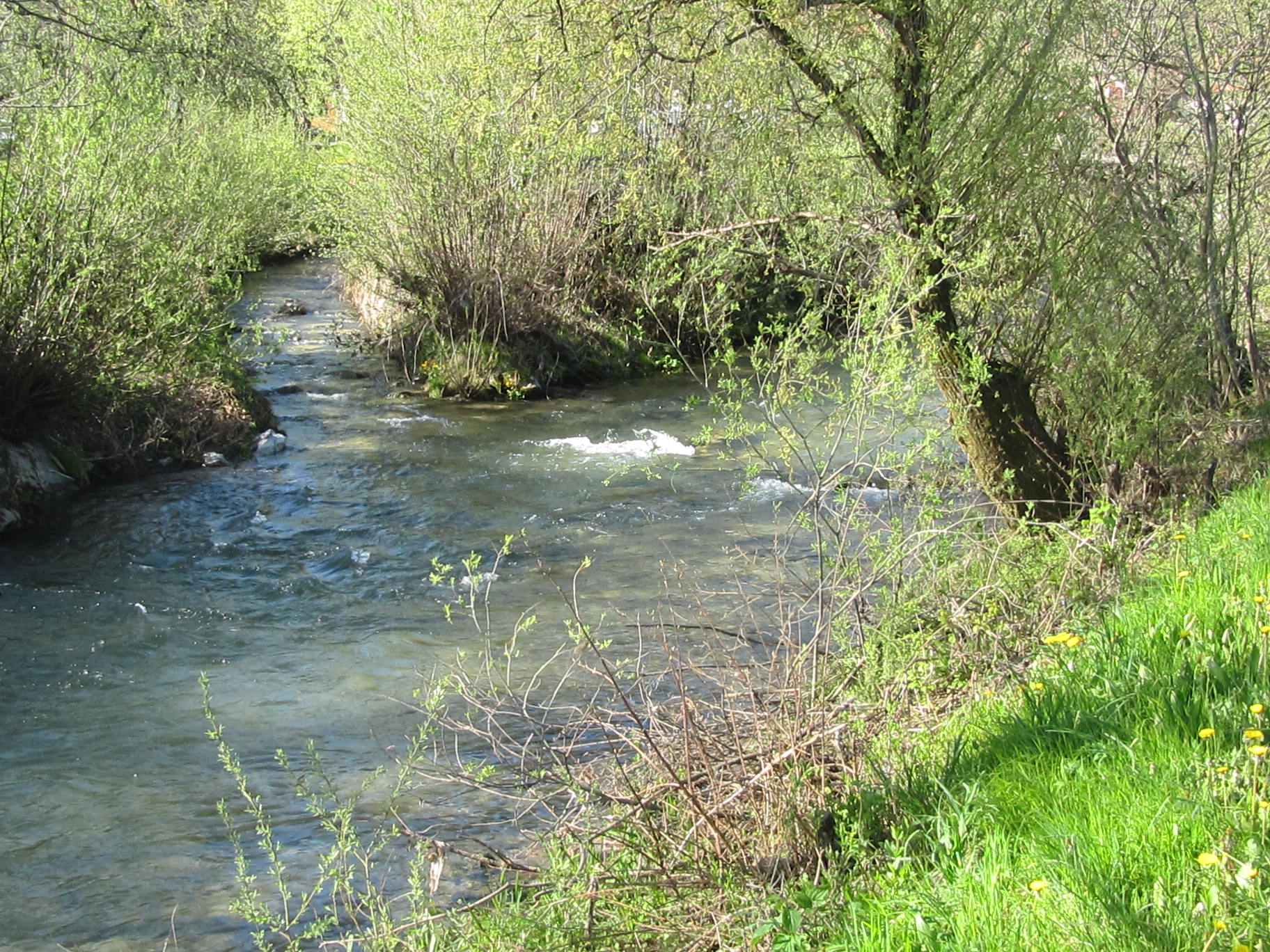
Confluence of Prosca Creek (left) with the Gradaščica River (right) in Dolenja Vas pri Polhovem Gradcu
