= Planina nad Horjulom =

- Location in Slovenia
- Coordinates: 46°2′52.02″N 14°12′54.88″E
- Country: Slovenia
- Traditional region: Upper Carniola
- Statistical region: Central Slovenia
- Municipality: Dobrova–Polhov Gradec

Area
  - Total: 4.44 km^{2} (1.71 sq mi)
- Elevation: 772.6 m (2,535 ft)

Population (2020)
  - Total: 121
  - Density: 27.3/km^{2} (70.6/sq mi)

Planina nad Horjulom (pronounced [plaˈnìːna nat xɔˈɾjúːlɔm]) is a dispersed settlement northwest of Horjul in the Municipality of Dobrova–Polhov Gradec in the Upper Carniola region of Slovenia. It includes the hamlets of Kolobocija, Lom, Pustota, and Zameja, as well as part of the hamlet of Suhi Dol.

== Name ==
The name of the settlement was changed from Planina to Planina nad Horjulom in 1953. The name Planina nad Horjulom literally means 'Planina above Horjul'. The name Planina is shared with several other settlements in Slovenia and means 'alpine pasture'.

== Church ==
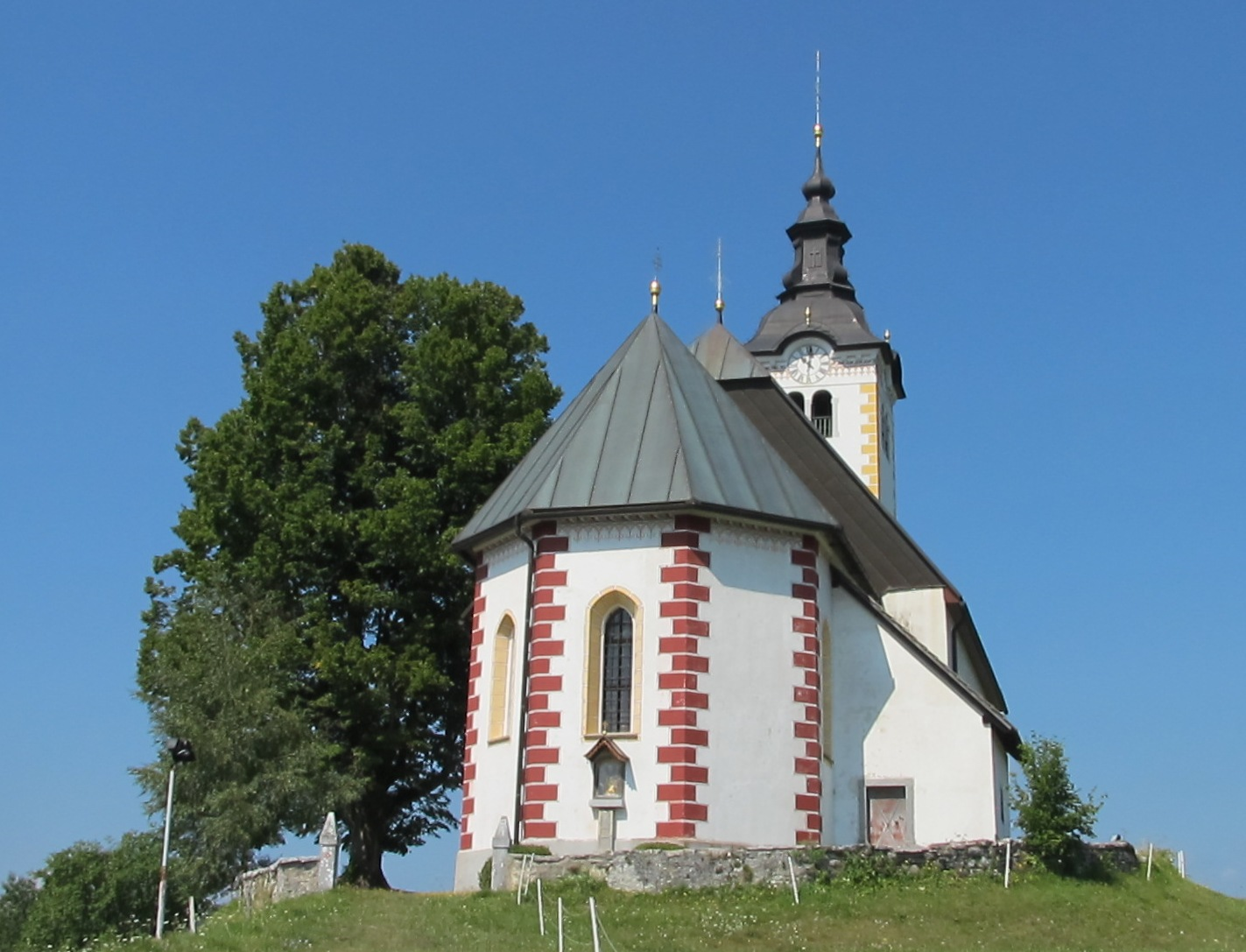
St. Andrew's Church

The local church is dedicated to Saint Andrew. It was first mentioned in written sources in 1526 and the current structure was built around 1659. The area for the congregation is divided by piers into a wide central nave flanked by narrower areas on the north and south. The part on the north has been converted into a chapel. The chancel is arched with a richly crested stellar vault. The main altar, which dates to 1850, and both side altars are the work of Jurij Tavčar, a sculptor from Idrija. He also used older Baroque sculptures in creating them. The altar dedicated to Our Lady of Sorrows dates to 1717.

== Notable people ==
Notable people that were born or lived in Planina nad Horjulom include:

- Metod Trobec (1948–2006), serial killer

== Gallery ==
The hamlet of Zameja

The hamlet of Suhi Dol

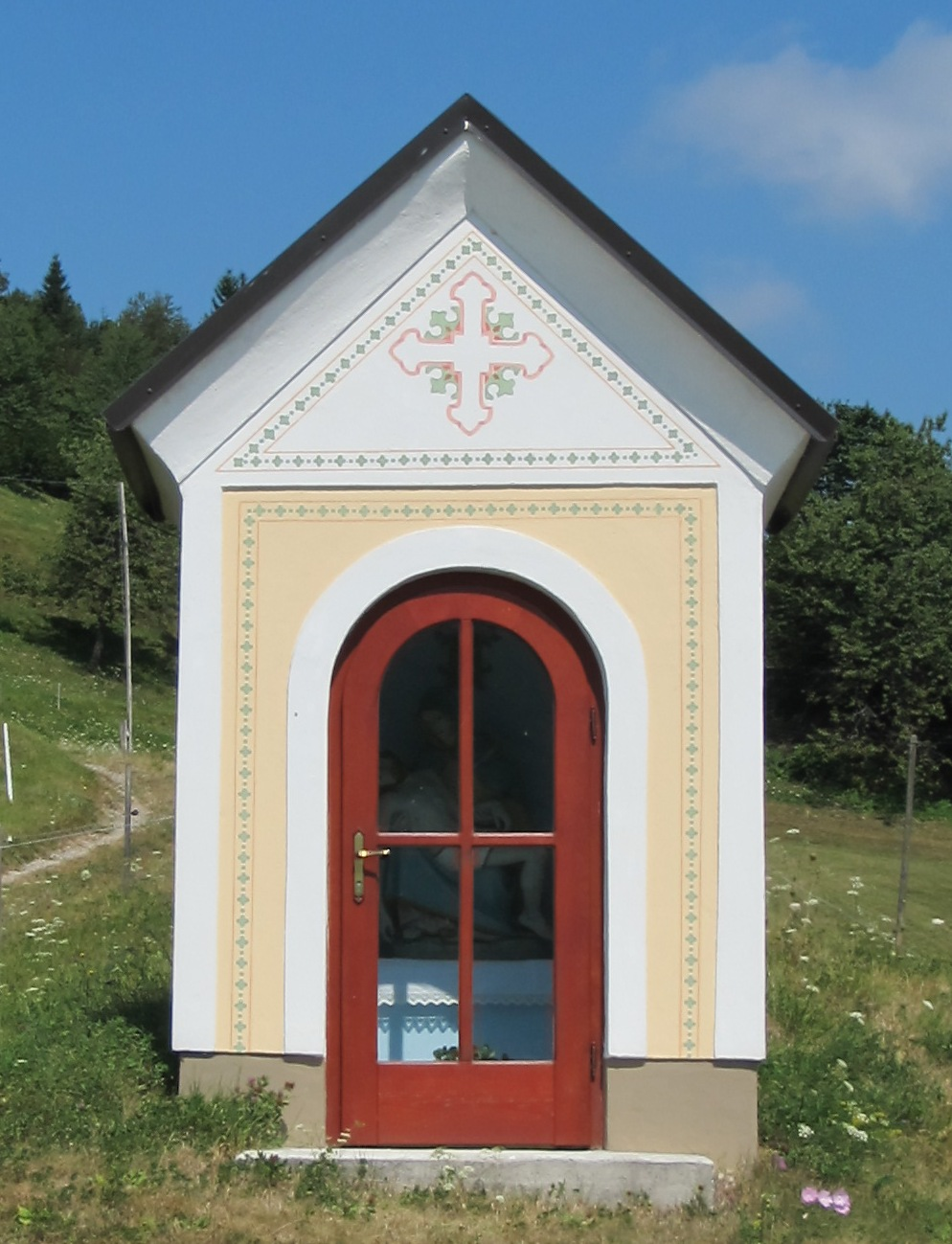
Chapel shrine in Planina nad Horjulom
