= Peračica =

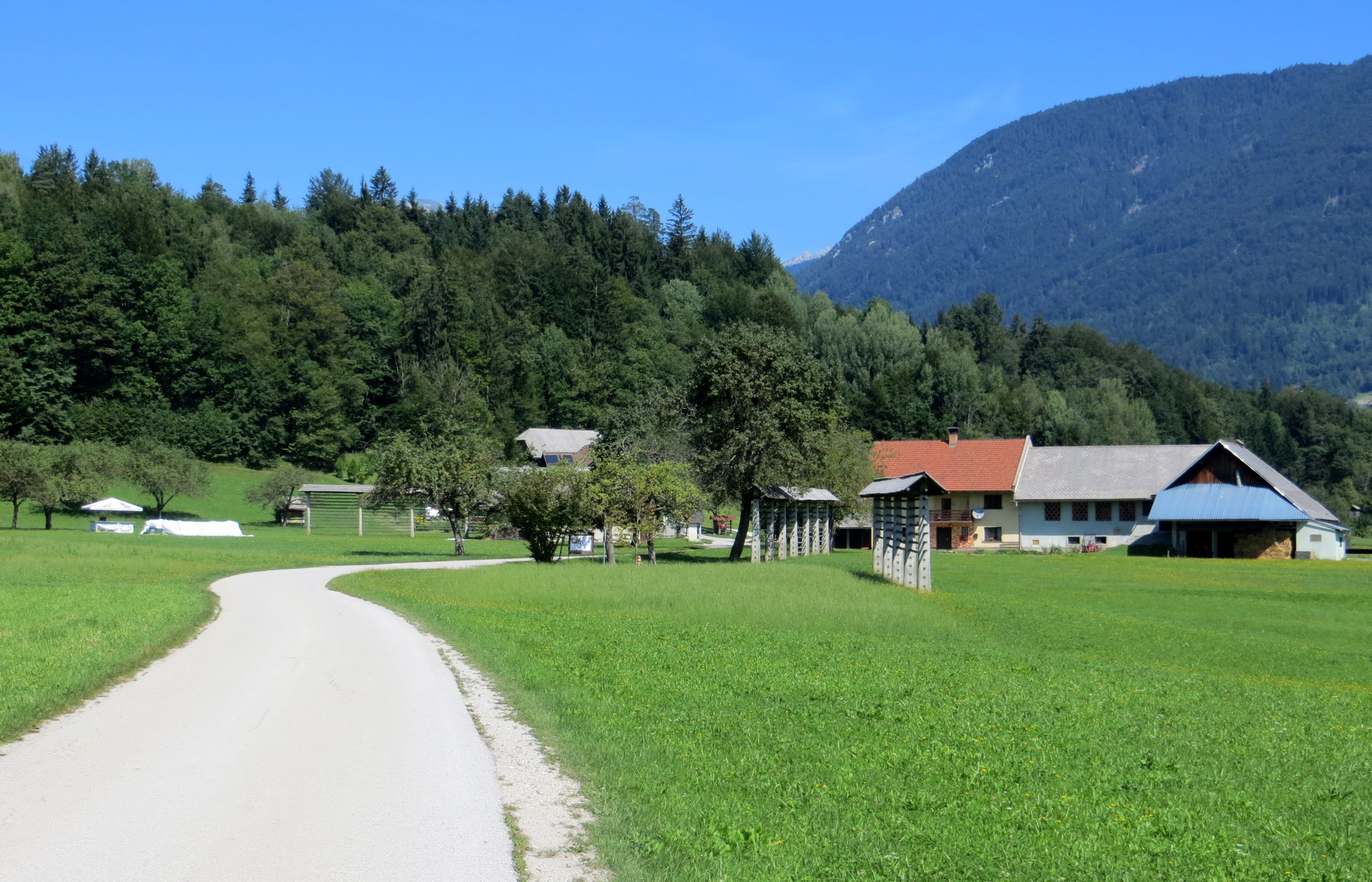

- Location in Slovenia
- Coordinates: 46°20′21.53″N 14°14′33.59″E
- Country: Slovenia
- Region: Upper Carniola
- Statistical region: Upper Carniola
- Municipality: Radovljica
- Elevation: 455.1 m (1,493 ft)

Population (2002)
  - Total: 33

Peračica (pronounced [pɛˈɾaːtʃitsa], in older sources also Pirašica, German: Piraschitz) is a settlement in the Municipality of Radovljica in the Upper Carniola region of Slovenia.

== Name ==
Peračica was attested in historical sources in 1253 as Peraschiz (and as Pirisicz in 1353 and Peroczicz in 1358). The name is originally a hydronym, referring to Peračica Creek, which runs west and south of the settlement and is known for its tuff deposits. The name is derived from the verb prati 'to strike, beat'. It also refers to water falling over a steep cliff (cf. Peričnik Falls), and in standard Slovene has also developed into the sense 'to wash clothing' (via the sense 'to beat laundry').

== Peračica tuff ==
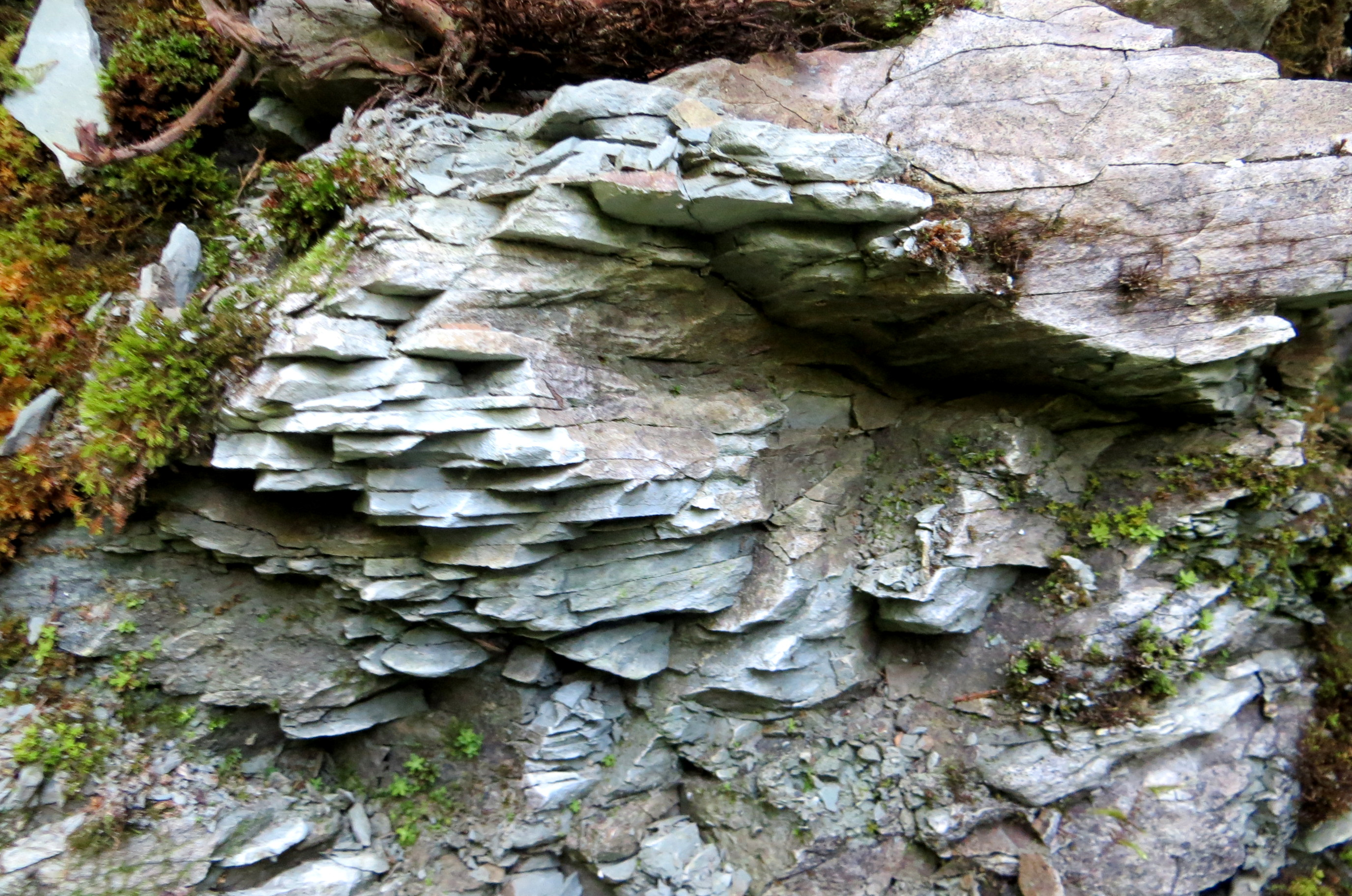
An outcropping of Peračica tuff

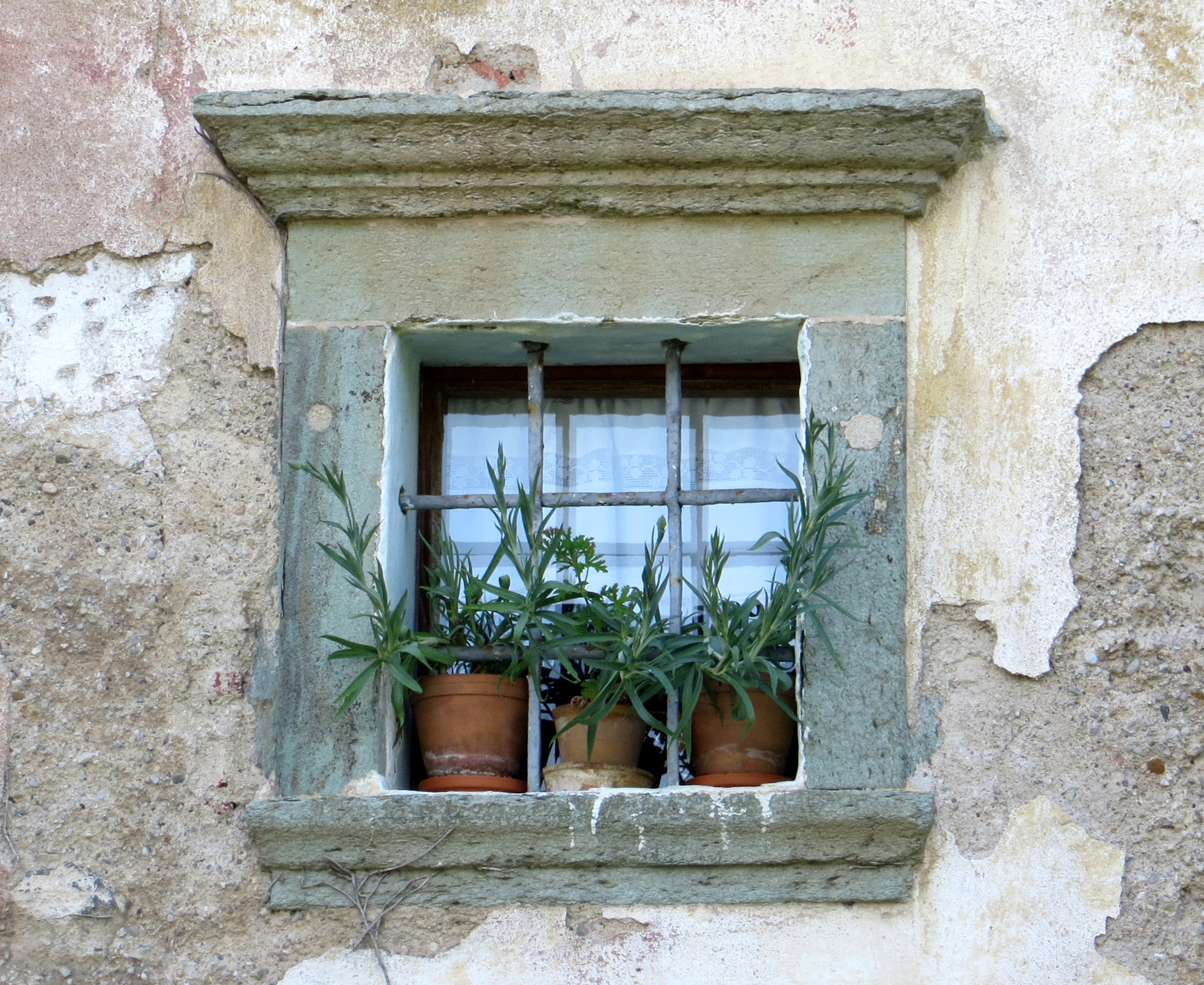
A traditional tuff window casing

Peračica tuff

The area along Peračica Creek, especially Črnivec and Brezje, is known for its deposits of characteristic green oligocene volcanic tuff, referred to as peračiški tuf 'Peračica tuff'. Mainly because it was easily cut, it was widely used in stonemasonry, particularly for door casings and window casings on traditional houses in the area.
