= Črnivec =

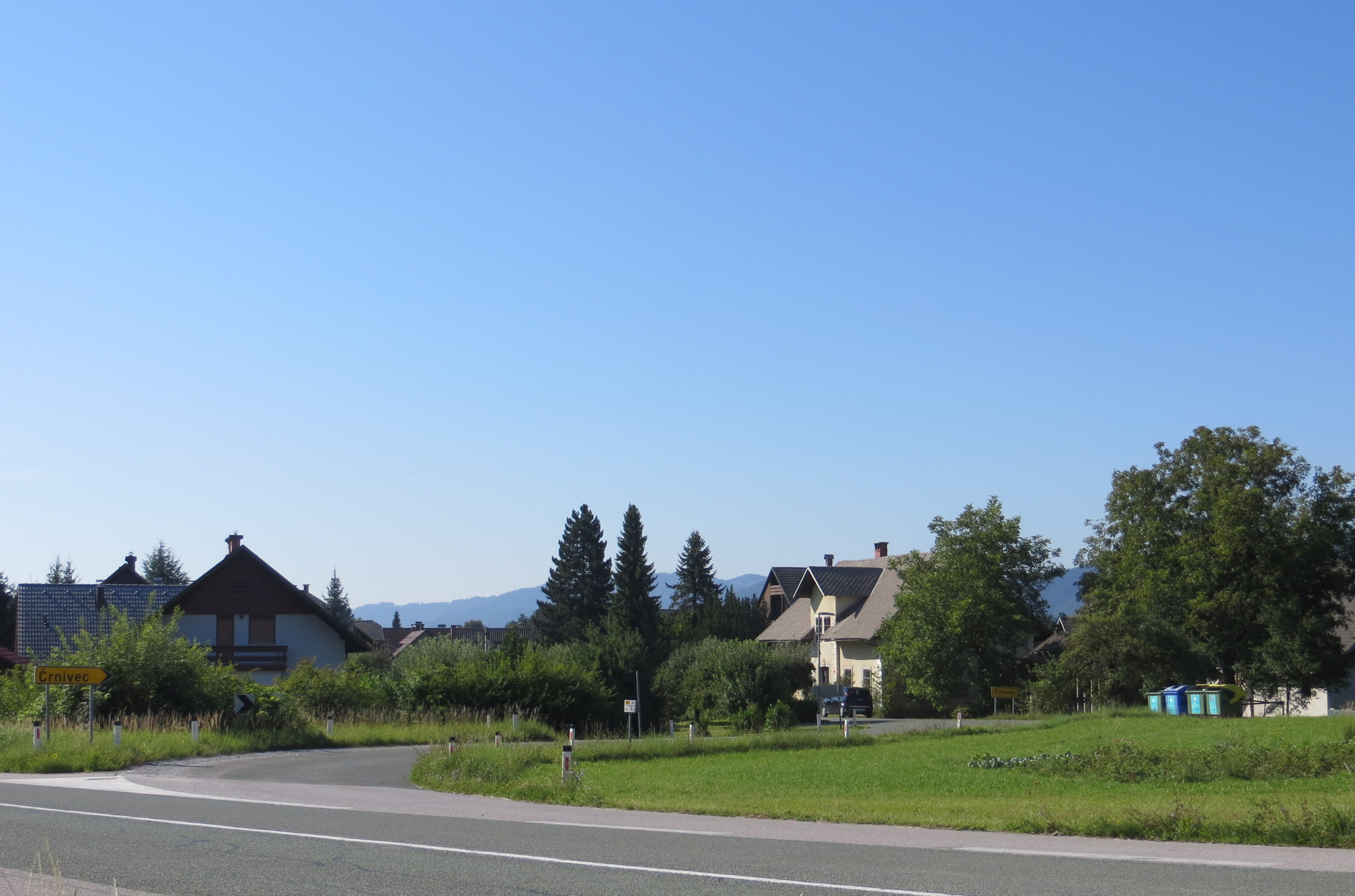

- Location in Slovenia
- Coordinates: 46°20′10.59″N 14°13′8.17″E
- Country: Slovenia
- Traditional region: Upper Carniola
- Statistical region: Upper Carniola
- Municipality: Radovljica
- Elevation: 500.2 m (1,641 ft)

Population (2002)
  - Total: 217

Črnivec (pronounced [ˈtʃəɾniːʋəts], German: Tscherniutz) is a settlement in the Municipality of Radovljica in the Upper Carniola region of Slovenia.

== Geography ==
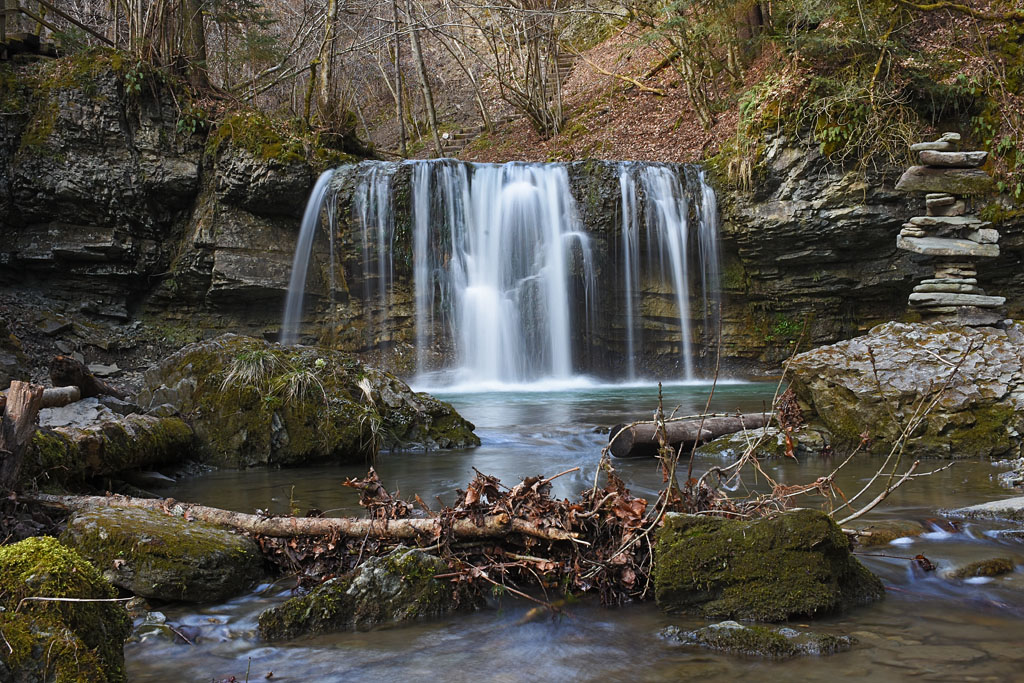
Peračica Falls

There is an abandoned Peračica tuff quarry in the foothills immediately north of Črnivec. Peračica Falls (Slovene: slap Peračica or Peračiški slap) is located along Peračica Creek on the northern edge of the village's territory. It is a 5-meter (16 ft) waterfall flowing over andesitic tuff.
