= Studena Gora =

- Location in Slovenia
- Coordinates: 45°31′32.14″N 14°12′35.47″E
- Country: Slovenia
- Traditional region: Inner Carniola
- Statistical region: Littoral–Inner Carniola
- Municipality: Ilirska Bistrica

Area
  - Total: 1.72 km^{2} (0.66 sq mi)
- Elevation: 576.5 m (1,891 ft)

Population (2002)
  - Total: 33

Studena Gora (pronounced [stuˈdeːna ˈɡɔːɾa]; Italian: Studena in Monte) is a small settlement southwest of Ilirska Bistrica in the Inner Carniola region of Slovenia.

== Clandestine grave ==
Studena Gora is the site of a clandestine grave from the end of the Second World War. The Parti Grave (Slovene: Grob Parti) is located in the woods about 1,100 meters (3,600 ft) east of Studena Gora, north of the road to Mala Bukovica. It contains the remains of a German soldier from the 97th Corps that fell at the beginning of May 1945.
