= Gornja Lokvica =

- Location in Slovenia
- Coordinates: 45°40′16.08″N 15°16′44.45″E
- Country: Slovenia
- Traditional region: White Carniola
- Statistical region: Southeast Slovenia
- Municipality: Metlika

Area
  - Total: 4.27 km^{2} (1.65 sq mi)
- Elevation: 277.7 m (911 ft)

Population (2002)
  - Total: 159
- Postal code: 8330

Gornja Lokvica (pronounced [ˈɡoːɾnja ˈloːkʋitsa]; German: Oberlokwitz) is a settlement northwest of Metlika in the White Carniola area of southeastern Slovenia. The entire area is part of the traditional region of Lower Carniola and is now included in the Southeast Slovenia Statistical Region.

== Mass grave ==
Gornja Lokvica is the site of a mass grave associated with the Second World War. The Jastrebenca Cave Mass Grave (Slovene: Grobišče jama Jastrebenca) is located west of the village and contains the remains of undetermined victims.

== Church ==
The local church is dedicated to John the Baptist and belongs to the Parish of Metlika. It was badly damaged during the Second World War and only the belfry and the sanctuary of the original building survive and are incorporated into the modern building.
