= Škemljevec =

- Location in Slovenia
- Coordinates: 45°42′7.16″N 15°14′38.34″E
- Country: Slovenia
- Traditional region: White Carniola
- Statistical region: Southeast Slovenia
- Municipality: Metlika

Area
  - Total: 2.45 km^{2} (0.95 sq mi)
- Elevation: 476 m (1,562 ft)

Population (2002)
  - Total: 23
- Postal code: 8331

Škemljevec (pronounced [ˈʃkeːmljɛʋəts]) is a small settlement in the Municipality of Metlika in the White Carniola area of southeastern Slovenia. The area is part of the traditional region of Lower Carniola and is now included in the Southeast Slovenia Statistical Region.

== Mass grave ==
Škemljevec is the site of a mass grave from the Second World War. The Klemenca Mass Grave (Slovene: Grobišče Klemenca) is located in a shaft southwest of the village. It contains the remains of six local Slovene civilians that were accused of sympathizing with anti-communist forces. The Partisans threw the victims into the cave, and the local people then dumped loam and rocks into the cave and sealed the entrance.
