= Mali Kamen =

- Location in Slovenia
- Coordinates: 46°2′1.67″N 15°30′6.32″E
- Country: Slovenia
- Traditional region: Styria
- Statistical region: Lower Sava
- Municipality: Krško

Area
  - Total: 4.4 km^{2} (1.7 sq mi)
- Elevation: 333.8 m (1,095 ft)

Population (2002)
  - Total: 242

Mali Kamen (pronounced [ˈmaːli ˈkaːmən], German: Kleinsteinbach) is a settlement northeast of Senovo in the Municipality of Krško in eastern Slovenia. The area is part of the traditional region of Styria. It is now included with the rest of the municipality in the Lower Sava Statistical Region.

== Mass grave ==
Mali Kamen is the site of a mass grave from the end of the Second World War. The Veliki Kamen Mass Grave (Slovene: Grobišče Veliki Kamen), also known as the Marsh Mass Grave (Grobišče Čreta), is located on the eastern edge of the settlement, 400 meters (1,300 ft) south of neighboring Veliki Kamen. The grave contains the remains of 20 to 30 Ustaša soldiers killed in mid-May 1945.

== Chapel ==
There is a small square chapel with a belfry in the settlement. It is dedicated to the Virgin Mary and was built in the 19th century.

== Gallery ==
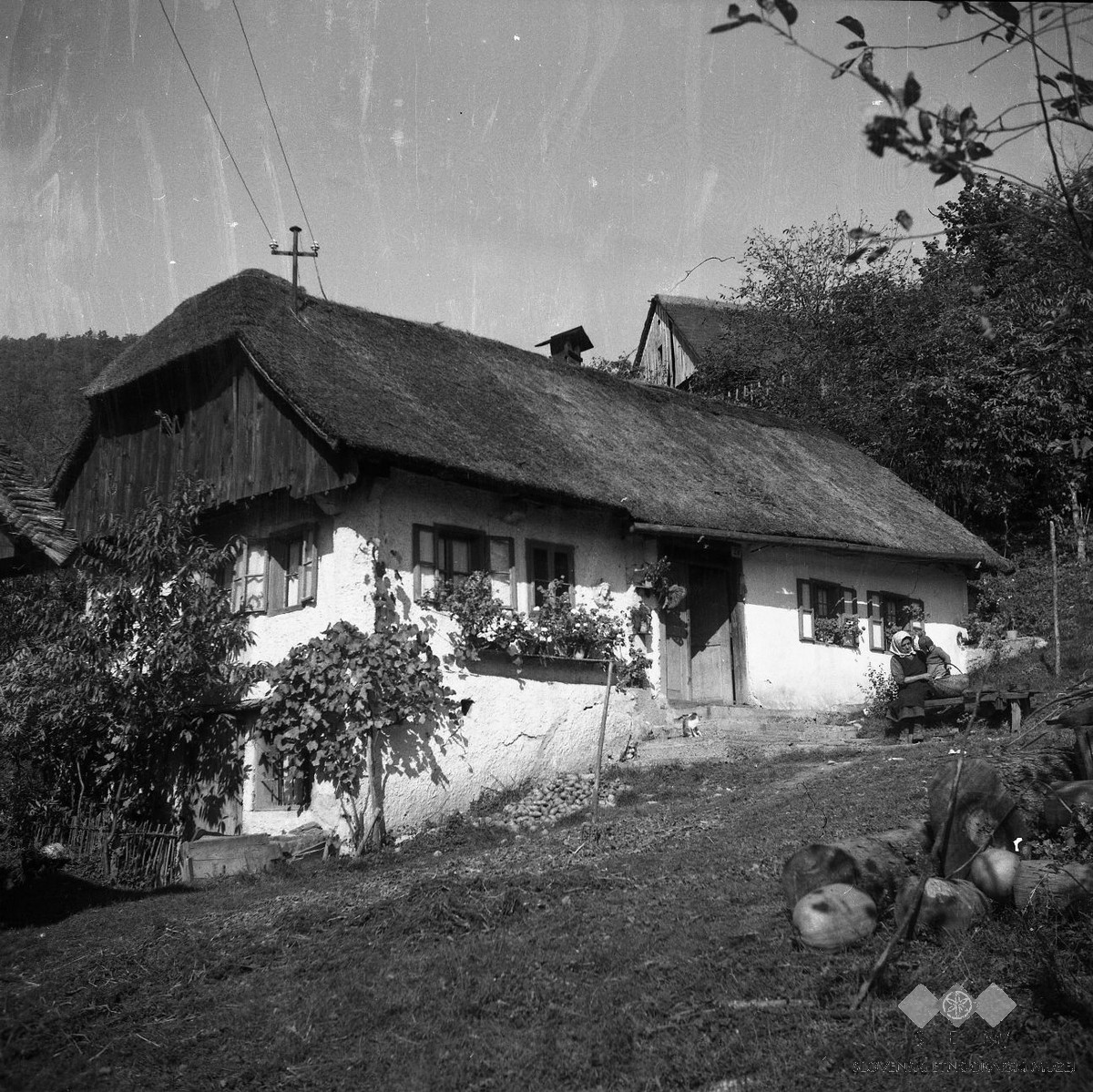
House in Mali Kamen
