= Pečje =

- Location in Slovenia
- Coordinates: 46°0′30.33″N 15°19′45.83″E
- Country: Slovenia
- Traditional region: Styria
- Statistical region: Lower Sava
- Municipality: Sevnica

Area
  - Total: 1.07 km^{2} (0.41 sq mi)
- Elevation: 299.2 m (982 ft)

Population (2002)
  - Total: 108

Pečje (pronounced [pɛˈtʃjɛ]) is a settlement in the Municipality of Sevnica in central Slovenia. It lies just east of Sevnica above the left bank of the Sava River The area is part of the historical region of Styria. The municipality is now included in the Lower Sava Statistical Region.

== Mass graves ==
Pečje is the site of two known mass graves associated with the Second World War. The Lončarjev Dol 1 and 2 mass graves (Slovene: Grobišče Lončarjev dol 1, 2) are located southeast of the settlement, south of the neighboring village of Lončarjev Dol. The first grave lies in a meadow on the edge of the woods 150 meters (490 ft) west of the house at Pečje no. 32 and contains the remains of 20 to 30 Ustaša soldiers. The second grave is on the edge of a copse on the east side of the road.

== Church ==
The local church is dedicated to Saint Margaret (Slovene: sveta Marjeta) and belongs to the Parish of Sevnica. It was originally a Gothic building that was heavily rebuilt and restyled in the Baroque in the 17th century and again in the 19th century.
