= Kuteževo =

- Location in Slovenia
- Coordinates: 45°31′48.86″N 14°19′52.17″E
- Country: Slovenia
- Traditional region: Inner Carniola
- Statistical region: Littoral–Inner Carniola
- Municipality: Ilirska Bistrica

Area
  - Total: 13.24 km^{2} (5.11 sq mi)
- Elevation: 466.6 m (1,531 ft)

Population (2002)
  - Total: 243

Kuteževo (pronounced [ˈkuːtɛʒɛʋɔ]; Italian: Cottesevo) is a village southeast of Ilirska Bistrica in the Inner Carniola region of Slovenia.

== Mass graves ==
Kuteževo is the site of two known mass graves from the end of the Second World War. They both contain the remains of German soldiers from the 97th Corps that were killed at the beginning of May 1945. The Hadrovec Mass Grave (Slovene: Grobišče Hadrovec), also known as the German Sinkhole Mass Grave (Grobišče Nemški vrtec), lies about 400 meters (1,300 ft) northeast of the settlement. It contains the remains of 20 prisoners of war, including a major. The Poliščice Mass Grave (Grobišče Poliščice), also known as the Pleščica Mass Grave (Grobišče Pleščica), lies about 100 meters (330 ft) north of the house at Kuteževo no. 1E and contains the remains of eight soldiers.

== Church ==
The small church in the settlement is dedicated to Saint Joseph and belongs to the Parish of Podgraje.
