= Gorenja Trebuša =

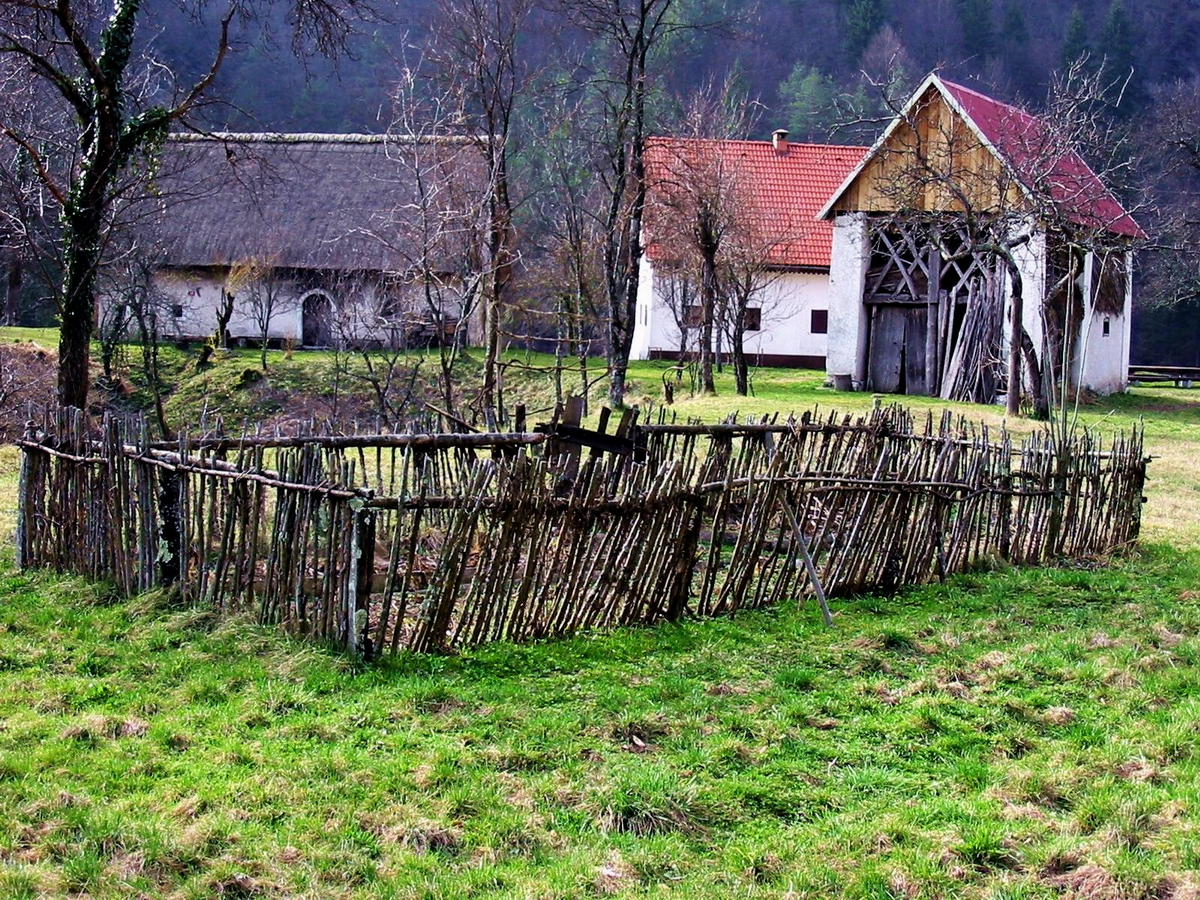
- Gorenja Trebuša

- Location in Slovenia
- Coordinates: 46°1′47.42″N 13°50′19.75″E
- Country: Slovenia
- Traditional region: Slovenian Littoral
- Statistical region: Gorizia
- Municipality: Tolmin

Area
  - Total: 23.76 km^{2} (9.17 sq mi)
- Elevation: 460.6 m (1,511 ft)

Population (2002)
  - Total: 96

Gorenja Trebuša (pronounced [ɡɔˈɾeːnja tɾɛˈbuːʃa], in older sources Gorenja Tribuša) is a dispersed settlement in the Municipality of Tolmin in the Littoral region of Slovenia.

== Church ==
The parish church in the settlement is dedicated to Saint Francis Xavier and belongs to the Koper Diocese.

== Mass graves ==
Gorenja Trebuša is the site of four known mass graves from late in the Second World War. The Makec Ravine 1 and 2 mass graves (Slovene: Grobišče Makčeva grapa 1, 2) are located north of the main settlement, on the right bank of the Trebuščica River. They contain the remains of about 30 Home Guard prisoners of war from the post at Črni Vrh that were murdered at the beginning of September 1944. The Peter Ravine Mass Grave (Grobišče Petrova grapa) is located on the right bank of the Trebuščica River, north of the building at Gorenja Trebuša no. 21 and east of the building at Gorenja Trebuša no. 22. It contains the remains of many civilians murdered between August 1944 and April 1945. The site has gradually been covered by scree. The Podgriva Ravine Mass Grave (Grobišče Podgrivška grapa) lies in a ravine along Pršjak Creek, south of the farm at Gorenja Trebuša no. 102. It contains the remains of many civilians murdered between August 1944 and April 1945.
