= Bovše =

- Location in Slovenia
- Coordinates: 46°16′53.21″N 15°20′49.21″E
- Country: Slovenia
- Traditional region: Styria
- Statistical region: Savinja
- Municipality: Vojnik

Area
  - Total: 1.24 km^{2} (0.48 sq mi)
- Elevation: 341.2 m (1,119 ft)

Population (2002)
  - Total: 103

Bovše (pronounced [ˈboːu̯ʃɛ]) is a settlement in the hills east of Vojnik in eastern Slovenia. The area is part of the traditional region of Styria. It is now included with the rest of the Municipality of Vojnik in the Savinja Statistical Region.

== Mass grave ==
Bovše is the site of a mass grave from the period immediately after the Second World War. The Tudrež Mass Grave (Slovene: Grobišče Tudrež) is located on the edge of the woods south of Tudrež Hill, next to Grilc Creek (Grilčev potok) by the Knafelc Meadow (Knafelčev travnik). It contains the remains of 13 male and female ethnic German civilians from Vojnik that were murdered in June 1945. The grave site was confirmed through probing in July 2010.

== Cultural heritage ==
The farmhouse at Bovše no. 7 is registered as cultural heritage. The one-story house dates to the mid-19th century and is a square stone structure. It has a gabled roof covered with clay roof tiles. The facade is segmented and there are the remnants of a fresco on the gable. The house stands among a cluster of farm buildings at a crossroads in the center of the village.
