= Jelični Vrh =

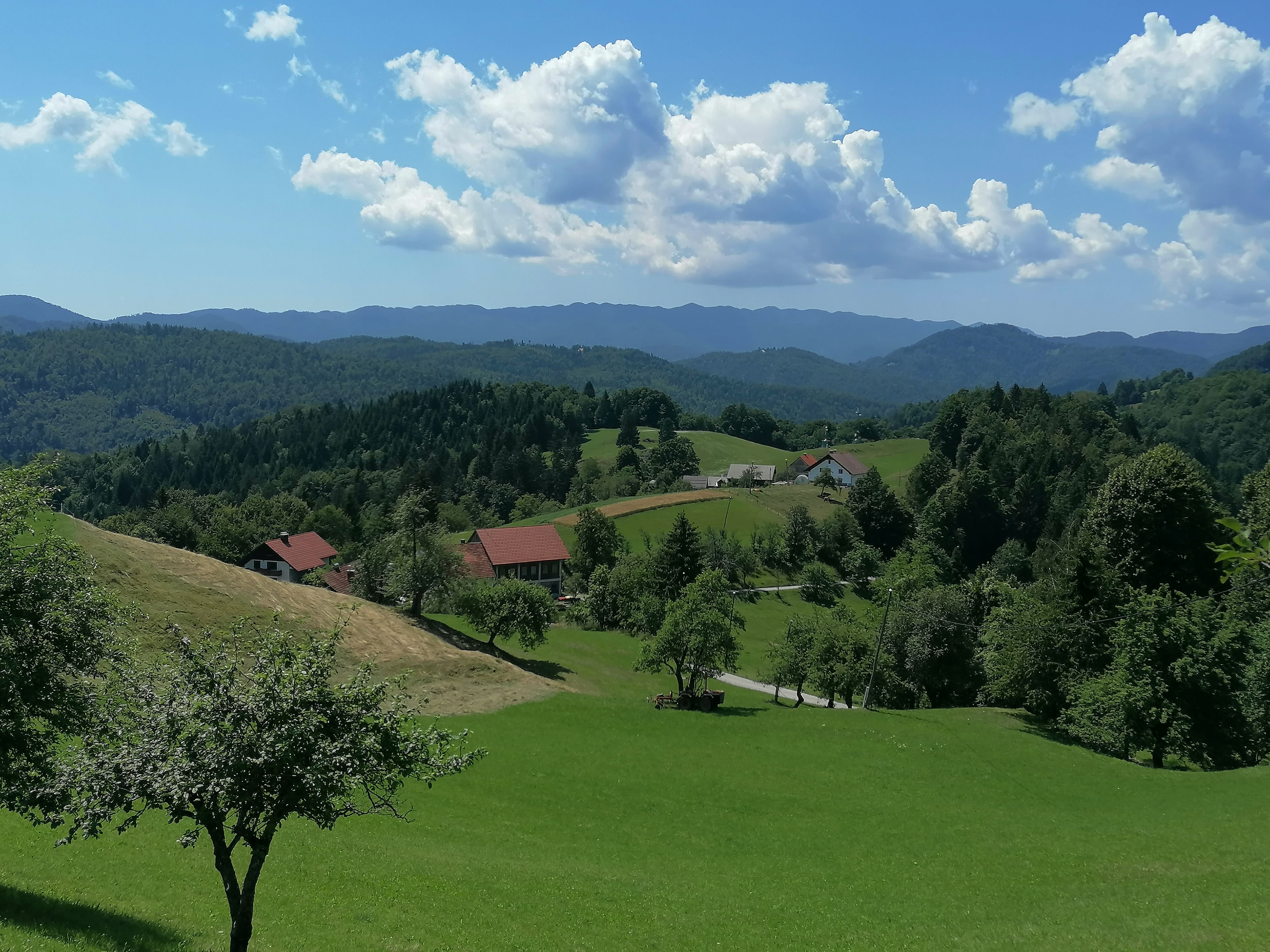

- Location in Slovenia
- Coordinates: 45°58′37.32″N 14°3′59.56″E
- Country: Slovenia
- Traditional region: Inner Carniola
- Statistical region: Gorizia
- Municipality: Idrija

Area
  - Total: 9.14 km^{2} (3.53 sq mi)
- Elevation: 640 m (2,100 ft)

Population (2002)
  - Total: 134

Jelični Vrh (pronounced [jɛˈliːtʃni ˈʋəɾx]; German: Jelitschenwerch) is a dispersed settlement in the hills southeast of Idrija in the traditional Inner Carniola region of Slovenia. It includes the hamlets of Baraka, Goverkarjev Vrh, Kališe, Pod Veharšami (or Veharše), and Vrh Žale.

== Mass graves ==
Jelični Vrh is the site of two known mass graves from the period immediately after the Second World War. Both graves are located southwest of the settlement, along an unpaved road at the beginning of the Brus Ravine (Slovene: Brusova grapa), on the right side of the road between Godovič and Idrija. They contain the remains of Slovene civilians murdered in June 1945. The total number of victims is believed to be between four and ten. The Brus Ravine 1 Mass Grave (Grobišče Brusova grapa 1) is believed to contain the body of one known victim, Jože Lazar. The Brus Ravine 2 Mass Grave (Grobišče Brusova grapa 2) contains the remains of an unknown number of victims.

== Notable people ==
Notable people that were born or lived in Jelični Vrh include:

- Anton Mažgon (1812–1849), lawyer, translator, and lecturer in civil law
