= Mereče =

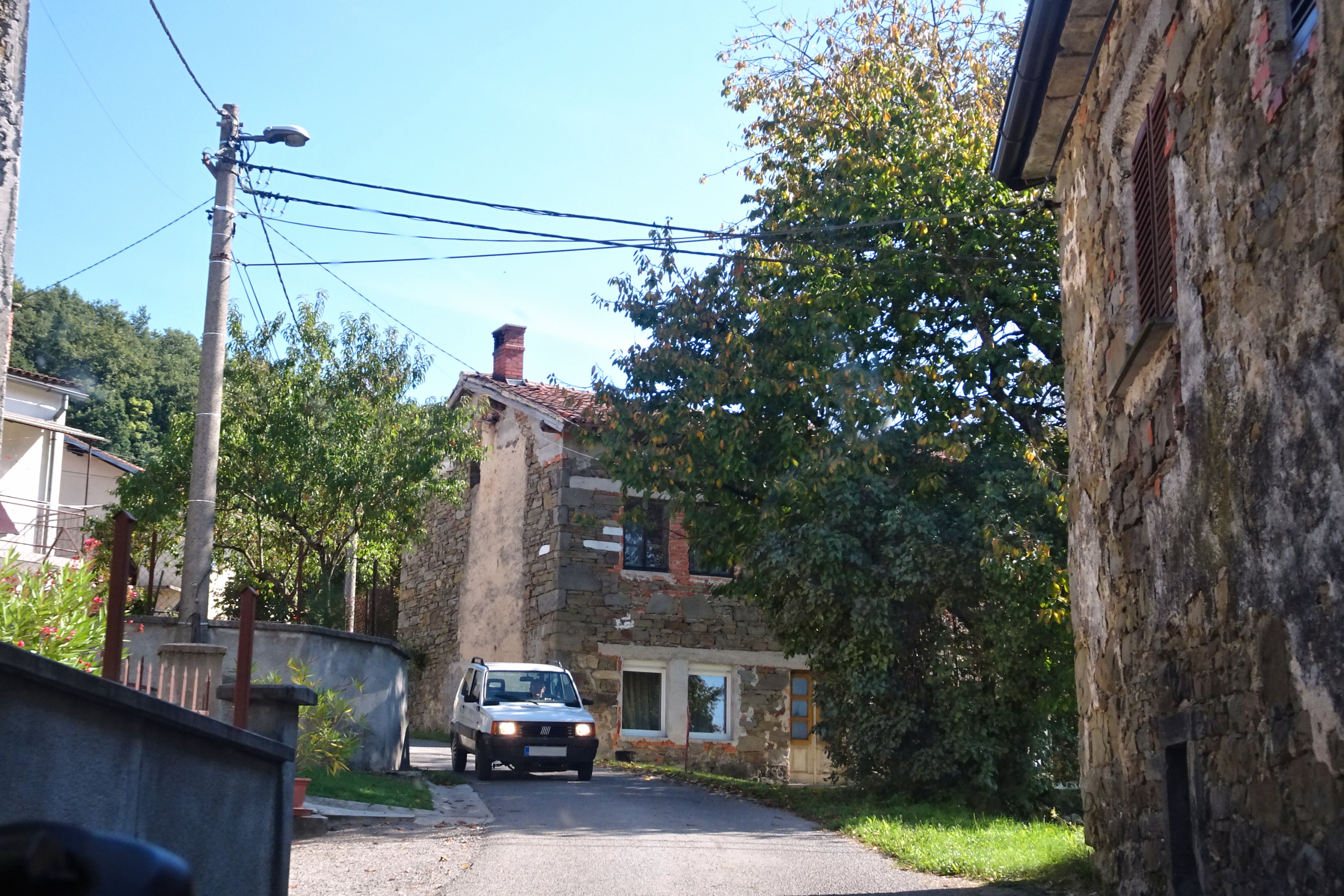

- Location in Slovenia
- Coordinates: 45°36′14.69″N 14°12′45.82″E
- Country: Slovenia
- Traditional region: Inner Carniola
- Statistical region: Littoral–Inner Carniola
- Municipality: Ilirska Bistrica

Area
  - Total: 2.35 km^{2} (0.91 sq mi)
- Elevation: 456.4 m (1,497 ft)

Population (2002)
  - Total: 62

Mereče (Slovene: [mɛˈɾeːtʃɛ]; German: Meretsche, Italian: Merecce) is a small village north of Ilirska Bistrica in the Inner Carniola region of Slovenia.

== Clandestine grave ==
Mereče is the site of a clandestine grave from the end of the Second World War. The Railroad Bridge Grave (Slovene: Grob pri železniškem mostu) is located on the east side of the railroad underpass, by a bus turnaround point, and contains the remains of a German soldier from the 97th Corps that fell at the beginning of May 1945.

== Church ==
The local church in the settlement is dedicated to the Sacred Heart of Jesus and belongs to the Parish of Ilirska Bistrica.
