= Kralji =

- Location in Slovenia
- Coordinates: 45°32′15.28″N 15°2′8.07″E
- Country: Slovenia
- Traditional region: Lower Carniola
- Statistical region: Southeast Slovenia
- Municipality: Kočevje

Area
  - Total: 3.88 km^{2} (1.50 sq mi)
- Elevation: 492.4 m (1,615 ft)

Population (2002)
  - Total: 12
- Postal code: 8342

Kralji (pronounced [ˈkɾaːlji]; in older sources also Kralje, German: Wertatsch) is a small settlement in the Municipality of Kočevje in southern Slovenia. The area is part of the traditional region of Lower Carniola and is now included in the Southeast Slovenia Statistical Region.

== Mass grave ==
Kralji is the site of a mass grave associated with the Second World War. The Lower Videm Mass Grave (Slovene: Grobišče pod Vidmom) lies in the woods about 220 meters (720 ft) south of the church in the hamlet of Videm in the neighboring settlement of Knežja Lipa. It contains the remains of unidentified victims.

== Church ==
The local church was a 17th-century pilgrimage church on a hill south of the settlement dedicated to the Prophet Elijah. It was burned down in a fire before the Second World War and was not rebuilt.
