= Smrje =

- Location in Slovenia
- Coordinates: 45°35′39.07″N 14°11′14.49″E
- Country: Slovenia
- Traditional region: Inner Carniola
- Statistical region: Littoral–Inner Carniola
- Municipality: Ilirska Bistrica

Area
  - Total: 5.09 km^{2} (1.97 sq mi)
- Elevation: 467.5 m (1,534 ft)

Population (2002)
  - Total: 122

Smrje (pronounced [ˈsməɾjɛ]; Italian: Smeria) is a village south of Prem in the Municipality of Ilirska Bistrica in the Inner Carniola region of Slovenia.

== Name ==
The name Smrje is probably derived from *Smьrďane, a plural demonym from the Slavic common noun *smьrdъ 'simple man'. However, it may also be derived from the identical Slavic common noun *smьrdъ 'juniper' and may therefore refer to the local vegetation.

== Mass graves ==
Smrje is the site of five known mass graves or clandestine graves from the end of the Second World War. They all contain the remains of German soldiers from the 97th Corps that fell at the beginning of May 1945. The Ravence Mass Grave (Slovene: Grobišče Ravence) is located in a meadow 1,100 meters (3,600 ft) south of Smrje and contains the remains of three soldiers. The Ločice 1 Mass Grave (Grobišče Ločice 1) lies in a swampy meadow 750 meters (2,460 ft) south of the village and contains the remains of two soldiers. The adjacent Ločice 2 Mass Grave (Grobišče Ločice 2) lies on the edge of the meadow and contains the remains of 10 or 11 soldiers. The Breg Grave (Grobišče Breg) is located about 250 meters (820 ft) northwest of the church and about 200 meters (660 ft) north of the house at Smrje no. 5, and contains the remains of one soldier. The Rob Grave (Grobišče Rob) is located on the edge of a meadow 1 kilometer (0.62 mi) southeast of the village and contains the remains of one soldier.

== Church ==
The local church in the settlement is dedicated to John the Baptist and belongs to the Parish of Prem.
