= Kamna Gora =

- Location in Slovenia
- Coordinates: 46°19′25.73″N 15°22′42.85″E
- Country: Slovenia
- Traditional region: Styria
- Statistical region: Savinja
- Municipality: Slovenske Konjice

Area
  - Total: 2.88 km^{2} (1.11 sq mi)
- Elevation: 688.9 m (2,260 ft)

Population (2002)
  - Total: 117

Kamna Gora (pronounced [ˈkaːmna ˈɡɔːɾa]) is a settlement in the Municipality of Slovenske Konjice in eastern Slovenia. It lies on the southern slopes of Mount Konjice (Slovene: Konjiška gora). The area is part of the traditional region of Styria and is now included in the Savinja Statistical Region.

== Mass grave ==
Kamna Gora is the site of a mass grave associated with the Second World War. The Kamna Gora Mass Grave (Slovene: Grobišče Kamna Gora) is located north of the settlement, on the slope of Mount Konjice. It contains the remains of 14 Slovenes that were mobilized into the German army.
