= Lukanja =

- Village
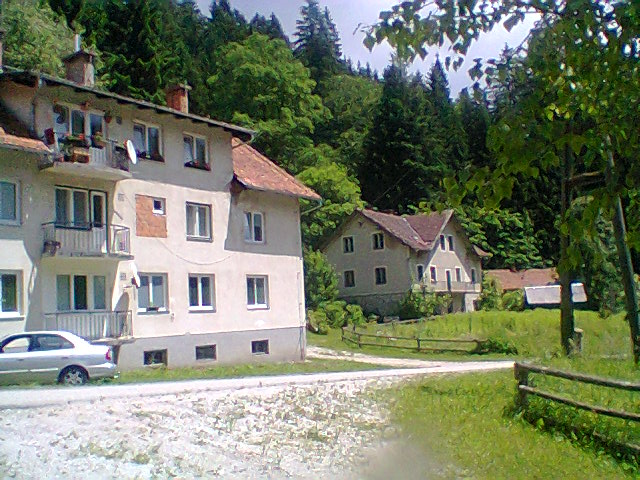

- Location in Slovenia
- Coordinates: 46°26′27.89″N 15°23′41.07″E
- Country: Slovenia
- Traditional region: Styria
- Statistical region: Drava
- Municipality: Slovenska Bistrica

Area
  - Total: 22.24 km^{2} (8.59 sq mi)
- Elevation: 884.8 m (2,903 ft)

Population (2002)
  - Total: 85

Lukanja (pronounced [luˈkaːnja]) is a dispersed settlement in the Pohorje Hills in the Municipality of Slovenska Bistrica in northeastern Slovenia. Some of the Rogla ski resort facilities extend into the territory of Lukanja. The area is part of the traditional region of Styria. It is now included with the rest of the municipality in the Drava Statistical Region.

== Mass grave ==
Lukanja is the site of a mass grave from the Second World War. The Lukanja Mass Grave (Slovene: Grobišče Lukanja) is located on a steep slope about 160 meters (520 ft) south of the peak of Mount Gradišče. It contains the remains of 40 German soldiers killed by an unknown Partisan unit in the summer of 1944.
