= Stari Grad, Krško =

Stari Grad Stari Grad pri Vidmu (until 1990)
- Location in Slovenia
- Coordinates: 45°56′49.79″N 15°32′16.76″E
- Country: Slovenia
- Traditional region: Styria
- Statistical region: Lower Sava
- Municipality: Krško

Area
  - Total: 0.41 km^{2} (0.16 sq mi)
- Elevation: 156.8 m (514 ft)

Population (2002)
  - Total: 237
- Postal code: 8270

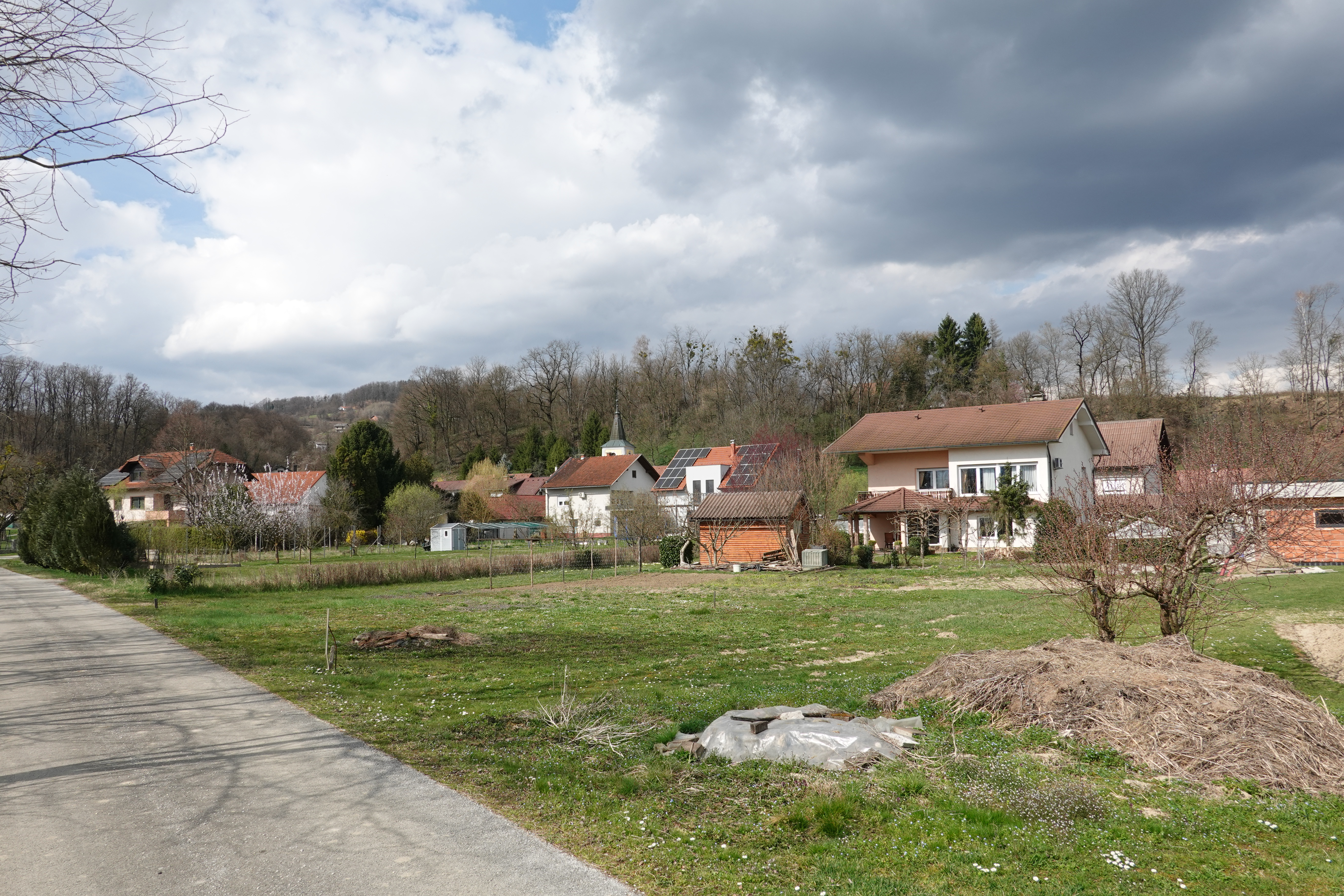
Stari Grad, Krško

Stari Grad (pronounced [ˈstaːɾi ˈɡɾaːt]; German: Altenhausen) is a settlement east of the town of Krško in eastern Slovenia. The area is part of the traditional region of Styria. It is now included with the rest of the municipality in the Lower Sava Statistical Region.

== Name ==
The name of the settlement was changed from Stari Grad pri Vidmu to Stari Grad in 1990. In the past the German name was Altenhausen.

== Mass grave ==
Stari Grad is the site of a mass grave from the end of the Second World War. The Stari Grad Mass Grave (Slovene: Grobišče Stari Grad) is located on the north side of the road from Krško to Brežice. It contains the remains of an unknown number of Croatian refugees.

== Church ==
The local church is dedicated to Saint Nicholas (Slovene: sveti Miklavž) and belongs to the Parish of Videm–Krško. It is a Baroque church, built in 1627 to commemorate the victims of the plague.
