= Kočna, Jesenice =

Kočna
- Location in Slovenia
- Coordinates: 46°24′53″N 14°4′49″E
- Country: Slovenia
- Traditional region: Upper Carniola
- Statistical region: Upper Carniola
- Municipality: Jesenice
- Elevation: 669 m (2,195 ft)

Population (2002)
  - Total: 209

Kočna (pronounced [ˈkoːtʃna]) is a settlement in the Municipality of Jesenice in the Upper Carniola region of Slovenia.

== Name ==
Kočna is a relatively common toponym in Slovenia. It is derived from the Slovene common noun kočna 'cirque' and originally refers to a local geographical feature.

== Mass grave ==
Kočna is the site of a mass grave from the period immediately after the Second World War. The Kočna Mass Grave (Slovene: Grobišče Kočna), also known as the Poljane nad Jesenicami Mass Grave (Grobišče Poljane nad Jesenicami), is located southeast of the settlement, a few dozen meters from a dirt road. It is a visibly sunken area measuring 4 by 1.5 meters (13.1 ft × 4.9 ft) and it contains the remains of up to 40 German prisoners of war murdered on 7 or 10 May 1945. One of the intended victims was able to escape.

== Cultural heritage ==
Excavations in 1982 at the Jamnik Rock Shelter (Slovene: Jamnikov spodmol) east of the settlement revealed artifacts from the Mesolithic era. The finds included a bone harpoon blade.
