= Pokoše =

- Location in Slovenia
- Coordinates: 46°24′58.34″N 15°36′32.2″E
- Country: Slovenia
- Traditional region: Styria
- Statistical region: Drava
- Municipality: Slovenska Bistrica

Area
  - Total: 4.39 km^{2} (1.69 sq mi)
- Elevation: 313.1 m (1,027 ft)

Population (2002)
  - Total: 205

Pokoše (pronounced [pɔˈkoːʃɛ]) is a village northeast of Slovenska Bistrica in northeastern Slovenia. The area is part of the traditional region of Styria. It is now included with the rest of the Municipality of Slovenska Bistrica in the Drava Statistical Region.

== Mass grave ==
Pokoše is the site of a mass grave from the period immediately after the Second World War. The Velenik Mass Grave (Slovene: Grobišče Velenik) is located about 600 meters (2,000 ft) east of the north freeway exit for Slovenska Bistrica. It contains the remains of civilians from Slovenska Bistrica that were murdered in May 1945 and buried in a former antitank trench.

== Cultural heritage ==
A number of Roman era burial mounds have been identified in the Velenik area south of the main settlement.
