= Raduše =

- Location in Slovenia
- Coordinates: 46°28′46.02″N 15°3′27.74″E
- Country: Slovenia
- Traditional region: Styria
- Statistical region: Carinthia
- Municipality: Slovenj Gradec

Area
  - Total: 6.958 km^{2} (2.686 sq mi)
- Elevation: 459.2 m (1,507 ft)

Population (2026)
  - Total: 207
  - Density: 30/km^{2} (78/sq mi)

Raduše (pronounced [ˈɾaːduʃɛ]) is a dispersed settlement in the City Municipality of Slovenj Gradec in northern Slovenia. The area is part of the traditional region of Styria. The entire municipality is now included in the Carinthia Statistical Region. In January 2026, the population was 207.

== Mass grave ==
Raduše is the site of a mass grave from the period immediately after the Second World War. The Žančani Mass Grave (Slovene: Grobišče Žančani) is located in the woods north of the settlement. It measures 90 meters (300 ft) long by 6 to 8 meters (20 to 26 ft) wide and contains the remains of Croatian soldiers, and Slovene and German civilians murdered around 20 May 1945.
