= Sidol =

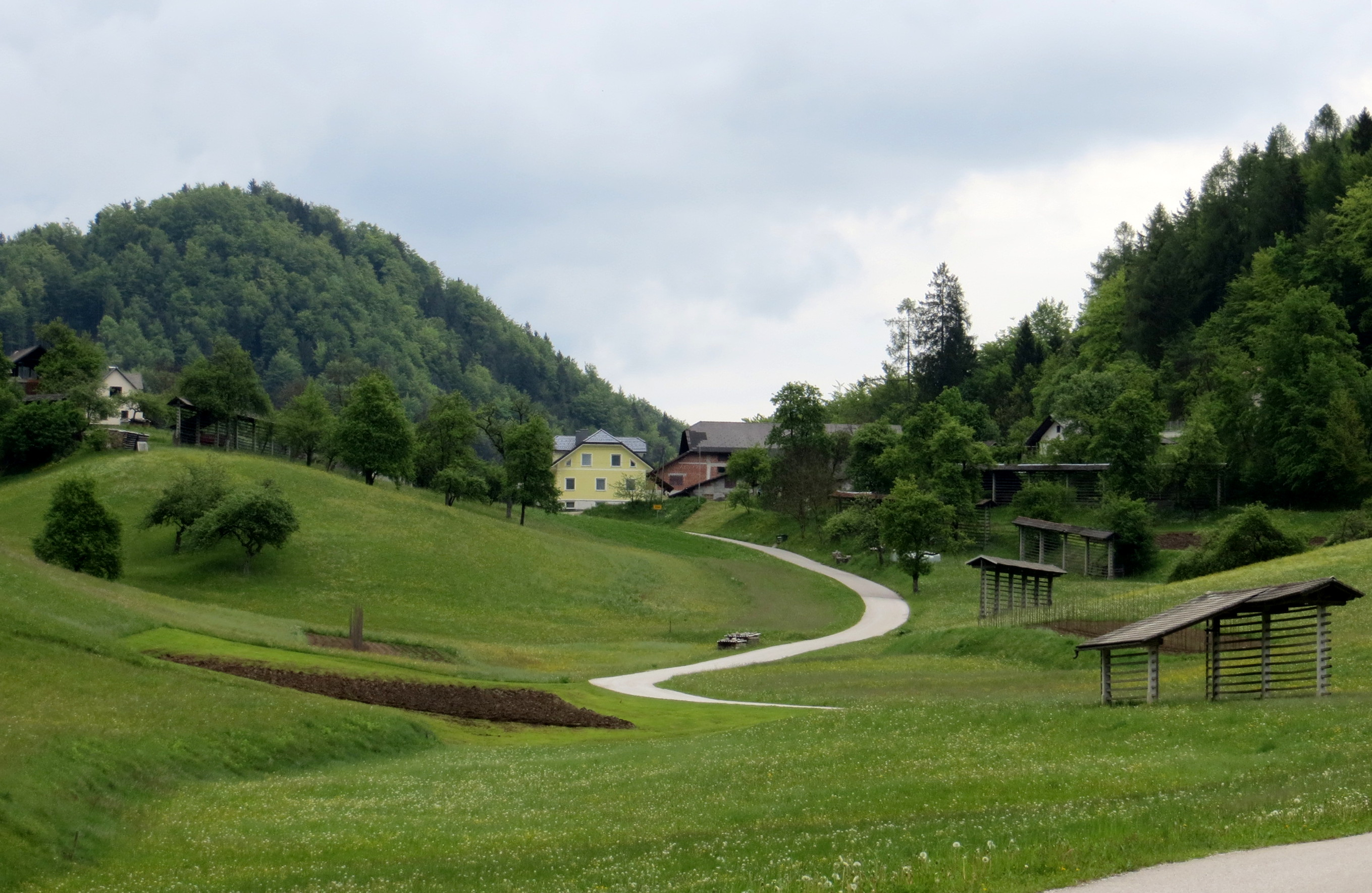

- Location in Slovenia
- Coordinates: 46°12′37.7″N 14°43′13.17″E
- Country: Slovenia
- Traditional region: Upper Carniola
- Statistical region: Central Slovenia
- Municipality: Kamnik

Area
  - Total: 2.51 km^{2} (0.97 sq mi)
- Elevation: 535.6 m (1,757 ft)

Population (2002)
  - Total: 58

Sidol (pronounced [ˈsiːdɔu̯]) is a small settlement in the Tuhinj Valley in the Municipality of Kamnik in the Upper Carniola region of Slovenia. It lies in a small enclosed valley in the hills above Šmartno v Tuhinju.

== Geography ==
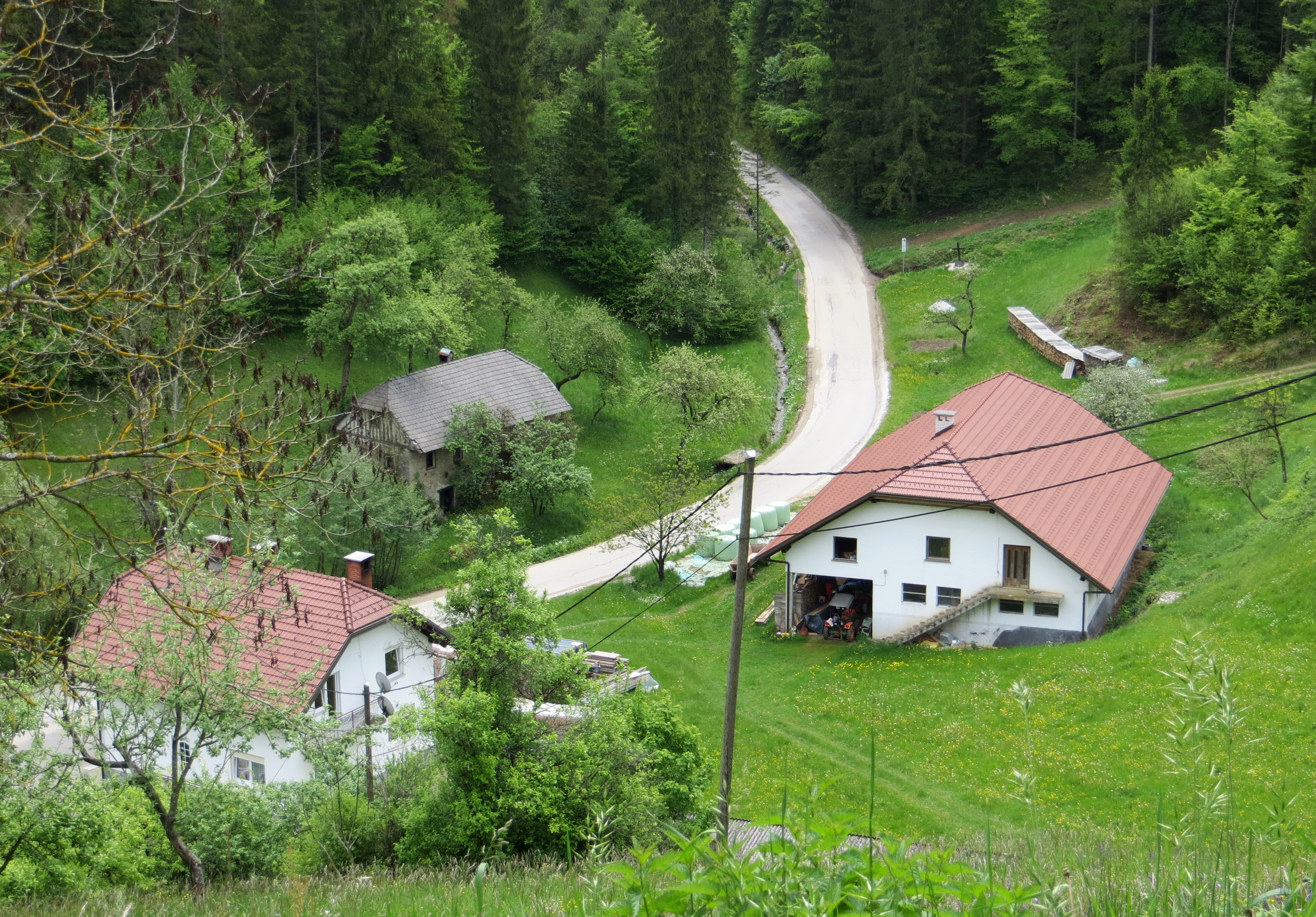
Jevnik, a hamlet of Sidol

Sidol is a clustered village on a small plain above the Nevljica River. To the south are Bare Peak (Goli vrh, 703 meters or 2,306 feet) and Velink Hill (809 meters or 2,654 feet). Sidol includes the hamlet of Jevnik (German: Jeunig) in a small valley west of the main village core.

== Name ==
Sidol was first mentioned in written sources in 1291 and circa 1400 as Suchidol (and as Suchwdol in 1477, as Sihidal in 1664, and as s Sidala in 1769). The name is a dialect contraction of Suhi dol (literally, 'dry valley'; Suhí dôl > Shídol > Sídol). The name refers to the local geography because there is no spring in Sidol.

== History ==
A bronze sculpture of a Roman deity was unearthed in Sidol in 1899 during excavation for a cistern, attesting to early settlement in the area.

=== Mass grave ===
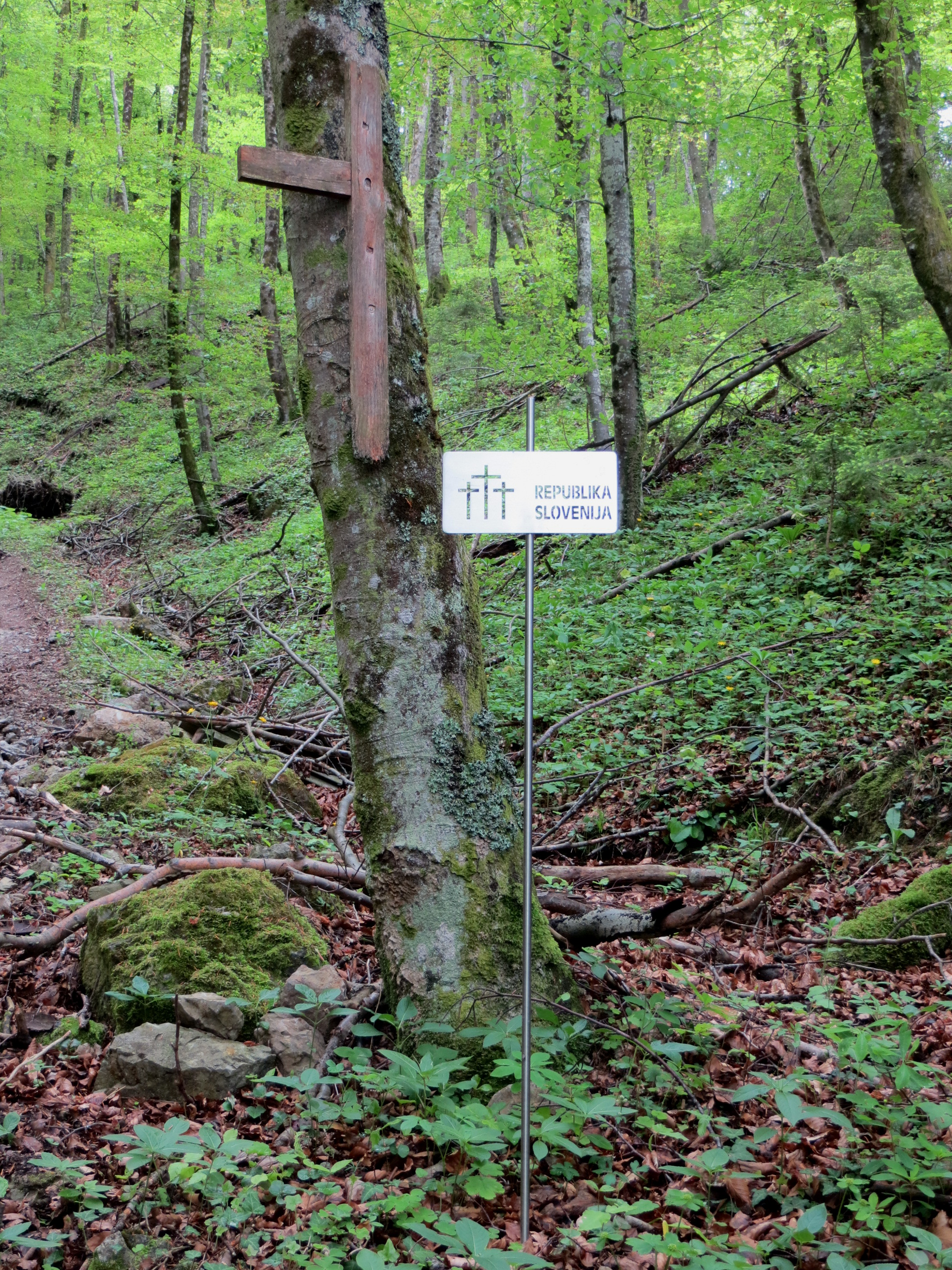
Jevnik Mass Grave

Sidol is the site of a mass grave from the period immediately after the Second World War. The Jevnik Mass Grave (Slovene: Grobišče Jevnik) is located in a meadow south of the hamlet of Jevnik, about 10 meters (33 ft) from the road. It contains the remains of Croatian soldiers, civilians, and Slovenes that were imprisoned at Šmartno v Tuhinju and murdered on May 13, 1945.
