= Škrajnek =

- Location in Slovenia
- Coordinates: 45°48′37.88″N 14°41′6.95″E
- Country: Slovenia
- Traditional region: Lower Carniola
- Statistical region: Southeast Slovenia
- Municipality: Ribnica

Area
  - Total: 0.66 km^{2} (0.25 sq mi)
- Elevation: 711 m (2,333 ft)

Population (2002)
  - Total: 8
- Postal code: 1316

Škrajnek (pronounced [ˈʃkɾaːi̯nɛk]; in older sources also Skranjek) is a small settlement north of Velike Poljane in the Municipality of Ribnica in southern Slovenia. The entire municipality is part of the traditional region of Lower Carniola and is now included in the Southeast Slovenia Statistical Region.

== Mass grave ==
Škrajnek is the site of a mass grave associated with the Second World War. The Škrajnek Shaft Mass Grave (Slovene: Grobišče Brezno pri Škrajneku) is located southwest of the village, along the road to Velike Poljane. It is believed to contain the remains of unidentified victims.

== Cultural heritage ==
There is a small chapel-shrine in the settlement. It dates to the mid-19th century.
