= Zabukovica =

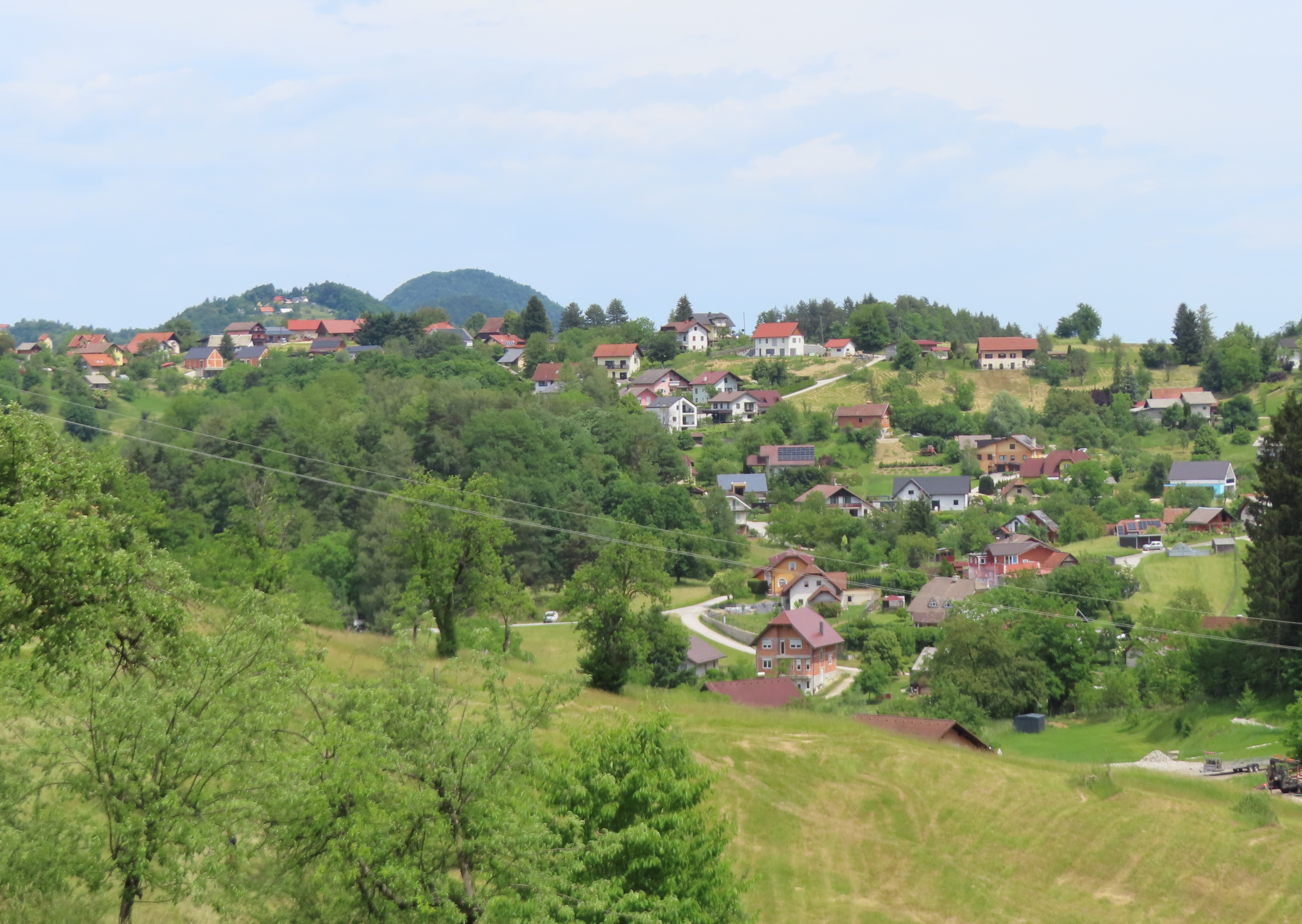

- Location in Slovenia
- Coordinates: 46°12′49.5″N 15°9′44.64″E
- Country: Slovenia
- Traditional region: Styria
- Statistical region: Savinja
- Municipality: Žalec

Area
  - Total: 3.46 km^{2} (1.34 sq mi)
- Elevation: 362.4 m (1,189 ft)

Population (2002)
  - Total: 931

Zabukovica (pronounced [zaˈbuːkɔʋitsa]) is a settlement in the Municipality of Žalec in east-central Slovenia. It lies in the hills south of Žalec. The area is part of the traditional region of Styria. The Municipality of Žalec is included in the Savinja Statistical Region. Zabukovica includes the hamlets of Kurja Vas, Močle, Odele, Podvine, Porence, Slovenski Dol (locally Tajčental, formerly Nemški Dol), Sončni Hrib, and Zabukovška Vas (or simply Vas).

== Mass grave ==
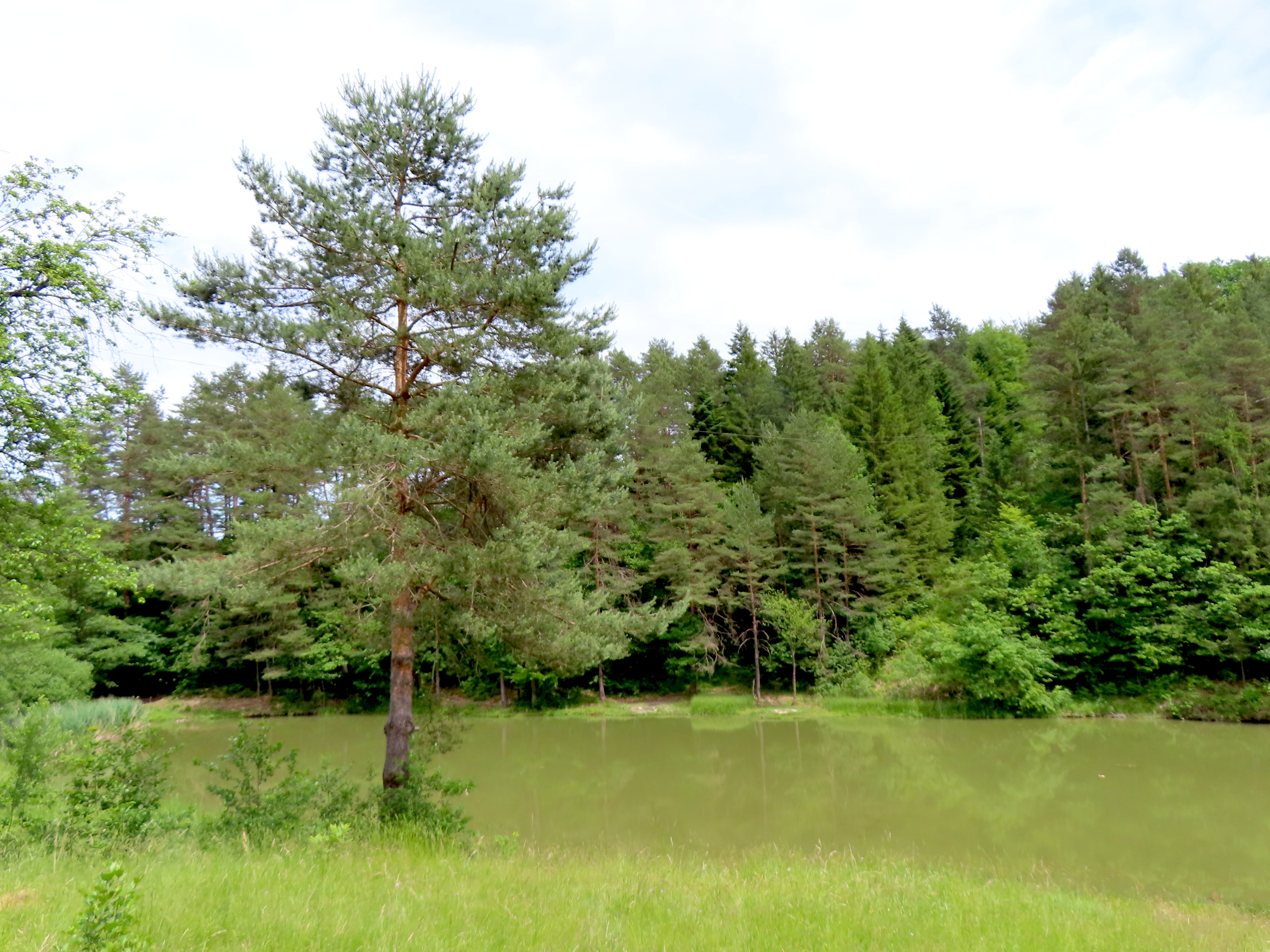
Liboje Pond and mass grave

Zabukovica is the site of a mass grave associated with the Second World War. The Liboje Pond Mass Grave (Slovene: Grobišče ribnik Liboje) is located east of Zabukovica, near the Potočnik farm (Zabukovica no. 147). The remains of unknown victims were discovered at the site by children after the war. The pond was created after the war.
