= Mrtvice, Krško =

Mrtvice
- Location in Slovenia
- Coordinates: 45°54′51.61″N 15°30′55.79″E
- Country: Slovenia
- Traditional region: Lower Carniola
- Statistical region: Lower Sava
- Municipality: Krško

Area
  - Total: 3.64 km^{2} (1.41 sq mi)
- Elevation: 154.6 m (507 ft)

Population (2002)
  - Total: 208
- Postal code: 8273

Mrtvice (pronounced [məɾˈtʋiːtsɛ]) is a village east of Drnovo in the Municipality of Krško in eastern Slovenia. The area is part of the traditional region of Lower Carniola. It is now included with the rest of the municipality in the Lower Sava Statistical Region.

== Mass grave ==
Mrtvice is the site of a mass grave associated with the Second World War. The Mrtvice Mass Grave (Slovene: Grobišče Mrtvice) is located in mixed woods and meadows 550 meters (1,800 ft) north of the settlement, at a crossroads on the gravel road towards the Sava River. It contains the remains of over 100 civilians and Croatian soldiers.

== Cultural heritage ==
A number of Roman graves have been found in the area, indicating the eastern extent of the necropolis of the nearby Roman town of Neviodunum.

There is a small open chapel-shrine in the settlement. It was built in 1926.
