= Strelac, Šmarješke Toplice =

Strelac
- Location in Slovenia
- Coordinates: 45°52′42.96″N 15°15′14.06″E
- Country: Slovenia
- Traditional region: Lower Carniola
- Statistical region: Southeast Slovenia
- Municipality: Šmarješke Toplice

Area
  - Total: 1.21 km^{2} (0.47 sq mi)
- Elevation: 208.3 m (683 ft)

Population (2002)
  - Total: 47

Strelac (pronounced [stɾɛˈlaːts]) is a small village in the Municipality of Šmarješke Toplice in southeastern Slovenia. It lies in the historical region of Lower Carniola just south of Šmarjeta. The municipality is now included in the Southeast Slovenia Statistical Region.

== Mass grave ==
Strelac is the site of a mass grave from the period immediately after the Second World War. The Jelenca Mass Grave (Slovene: Grobišče Jelenca) is located 400 meters (1,300 ft) southwest of the settlement in a sinkhole in the woods. It contains the remains of six unidentified victims murdered after the war.
