= Predgriže =

- Location in Slovenia
- Coordinates: 45°55′50.98″N 14°3′38.2″E
- Country: Slovenia
- Traditional region: Inner Carniola
- Statistical region: Gorizia
- Municipality: Idrija

Area
  - Total: 7.88 km^{2} (3.04 sq mi)
- Elevation: 662.3 m (2,173 ft)

Population (2002)
  - Total: 164

Predgriže (pronounced [pɾɛdˈɡɾiːʒɛ]; German: Predgrische) is a settlement northeast of Črni Vrh in the Municipality of Idrija in the traditional Inner Carniola region of Slovenia. The village includes the hamlets of Gornje Griže (German: Oberpredgrische), Klavžar, Nagode, Na Vrhu, Smrekar, Spodnje Griže (German: Unterpredgrische), and Žgavec.

== Mass grave ==
Predgriže is the site of a mass grave associated with the Second World War. The Crow Peak Shaft 2 Mass Grave (Slovene: Grobišče Brezno 2 SZ od Vranjega vrha) is located about 2.5 kilometers (1.6 mi) north of Predgriže and about 2.5 kilometers (1.6 mi) west of Godovič. It contains the remains of unidentified victims.
