= Fabci =

- Location in Slovenia
- Coordinates: 45°29′54.25″N 14°20′4.12″E
- Country: Slovenia
- Traditional region: Inner Carniola
- Statistical region: Littoral–Inner Carniola
- Municipality: Ilirska Bistrica

Area
  - Total: 1.3 km^{2} (0.50 sq mi)
- Elevation: 634.6 m (2,082 ft)

Population (2002)
  - Total: 11

Fabci (pronounced [ˈfaːptsi]) is a small settlement in the hills southeast of Ilirska Bistrica in the Inner Carniola region of Slovenia, close to the border with Croatia.

== Clandestine graves ==
Fabci is the site of two clandestine graves from the end of the Second World War. The Church Grave (Slovene: Grob pri cerkvi) is located behind the church. It contains the remains of a Croatian farmhand from Grobnik named Matija, who was shot by German troops while fleeing. The Hbt Grave (Grob Hbt) is located about 300 meters (980 ft) southeast of the church. It contains the remains of a German soldier from the 97th Corps that was killed at the beginning of May 1945.
