= Mass graves in Slovenia =

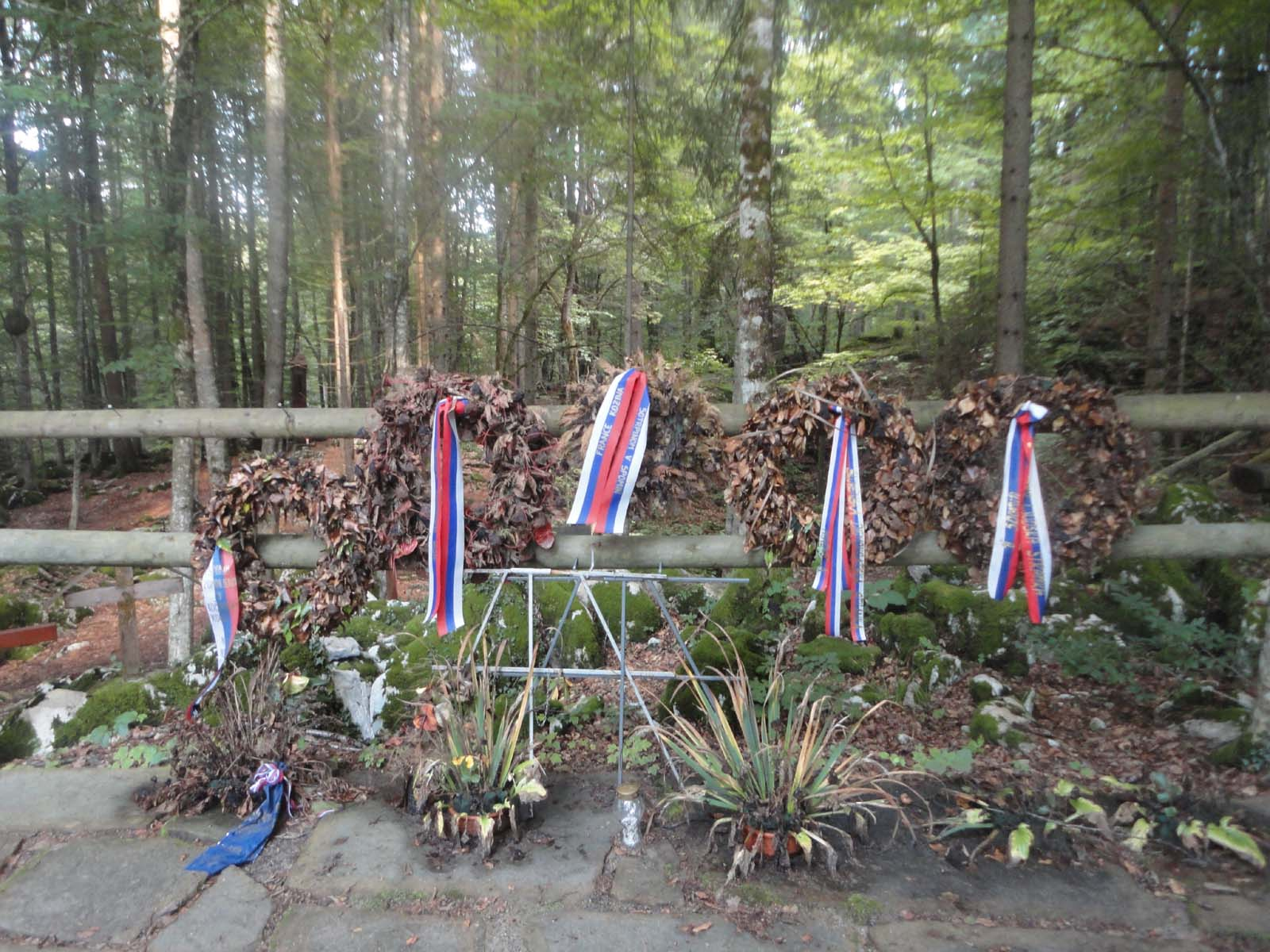
Memorial at the Kren Cave Mass Grave

Mass graves in Slovenia were created in Slovenia as the result of extrajudicial killings during and after the Second World War. These clandestine mass graves are also known as "concealed mass graves" (Slovene: prikrita grobišča) or "silenced mass graves" (zamolčana grobišča) because their existence was concealed under the communist regime from 1945 to 1990.

Some of the sites, such as the mass graves in Maribor, include some of the largest mass graves in Europe. Over 750 such sites have been registered by the Commission on Concealed Mass Graves in Slovenia, containing the remains of up to 100,000 victims. They have been compared by the Slovenian historian Jože Dežman to the Killing Fields in Cambodia.

== Background ==
Many of the mass graves were created during the war, but the larger sites date from after the war. The wartime graves vary from those of soldiers killed in battle to groups that were targeted by the Partisans due to their ethnicity (e.g., Romani) or other civilians murdered for political reasons.

The postwar graves from the Bleiburg repatriations contain the remains of suspected collaborators, soldiers, and civilians that fled towards Austria in May and June 1945, as well as groups targeted because of their ethnicity (e.g., Gottschee Germans, Hungarians, and Italians). and civilians that were the victims of political purges or marked as "class enemies" to eliminate potential opponents to the new regime.

After the war, the communist authorities denied that the executions had taken place. Attempts to reveal the events were suppressed, evidence was destroyed, and no exhumations took place. People were forbidden from visiting the graves, and many were hidden under waste.

After the collapse of Yugoslavia, researchers in Slovenia started writing about the executions and exhumations were undertaken. However, some left-wing parties, in particular the Social Democrats, have been accused of stalling such investigations.

== List of graves ==
This table includes mass graves and individual graves registered by the Commission on Concealed Mass Graves in Slovenia. Some names are synonyms. The label "soldiers" includes prisoners of war.

English name	Slovene name	Settlement	Municipality	Number	Victims
Abandoned Cemetery Mass Grave	Grobišče na opuščenem pokopališču	Trbovlje	Trbovlje	30	German soldiers
Ajdov Field Mass Grave	Grobišče Ajdovsko polje	Ustje	Ajdovščina	67	German and Italian soldiers
Ajhar Shaft Mass Grave	Grobišče Ajharjevo brezno	Idrijski Log	Idrija	Unknown	Unknown
Andrejc Field Mass Grave	Grobišče Andrejčevo polje	Radovljica	Radovljica	2	Unknown
Andrejček Shaft Mass Grave	Grobišče Andrejčkovo brezno	Idrijski Log	Idrija	Unknown	Slovene and Italian civilians
Antitank Trench Mass Grave	Grobišče v protitankovskem jarku	Mostec	Brežice	Unknown	Croatian and Slovene soldiers and civilians
Baba Mass Grave	Grobišče Pod babo	Jasen	Ilirska Bistrica	2	Chetnik soldiers
Babji Ložič Mass Grave	Grobišče Babji Ložič	Ljutomer	Ljutomer	9–12	Slovene civilians
Babno 19B Grave	Grob pri domačiji Babno 19 B	Celje	Celje	1	Croatian soldier
Balant Spruce Woods Mass Grave	Grobišča v Balantovem smrečju	Crngrob	Škofja Loka	200–300	Croatian soldiers and civilians, Slovene soldiers
Balant Valleys Shaft Mass Grave	Grobišče Brezno v Balantovih dolinah	Dolenja Vas	Cerknica	Unknown	Unknown
Bank Grave	Grob pri banki	Dobrovnik	Dobrovnik	1	German soldier
Barbara Pit Mass Grave	Grobišče Barbara rov	Huda Jama	Laško	> 3,000	Slovene soldiers and civilians, Croatian soldiers
Barracks Mass Grave	Grobišče pri vojašnici	Hodoš	Hodoš	Unknown	Hungarians
Bašelj Shaft 2 Mass Grave	Grobišče Brezno na Bašlju 2	Hrovača	Ribnica	Unknown	Unknown
Baud Fallow 1 and 2 mass graves	Grobišče Baudova ledina 1, 2	Moste	Žirovnica	6–12	Croatian soldiers
Bavh Mass Grave	Grobišče Pod Bavhom	Otiški Vrh	Dravograd	Unknown	Unknown
Bear Cave Mass Grave	Grobišče Medvedova jama	Grč Vrh	Mirna Peč	Unknown	Unknown
Bear Valley Mass Grave	Grobišče v Medvedovi dolini	Vincarje	Škofja Loka	20	German soldiers
Bele Linden Mass Grave	Grobišče Belejeva lipa	Vrba	Žirovnica	20	Unknown
Bele Vode 1 Mass Grave	Grobišče Bele vode 1	Bele Vode	Šoštanj	6	Ukrainian soldiers
Bele Vode 2 Mass Grave	Grobišče Bele vode 2	Bele Vode	Šoštanj	7	Ukrainian soldiers
Beton Cave Mass Grave	Grobišče Betonova jama	Spodnje Gorje	Gorje	3	German soldiers
Betonovo Grave	Grob Betonovo	Betonovo	Sodražica	1	Slovene pilot
Bevk Street Mass Grave	Grobišče na Bevkovi ulici	Vipava	Vipava	Unknown	German soldiers
Bezelj 1 Mass Grave	Grobišče pri Bezlju 1	Retje	Loški Potok	5	German soldiers
Bezelj 2 Mass Grave	Grobišče pri Bezlju 2	Retje	Loški Potok	5	Slovene and Russian soldiers
Bežigrad Mass Grave	Grobišče Bežigrad	Bukovžlak	Celje	Unknown	German soldiers, ethnic German civilians, Slovene soldiers and civilians, Croatian soldiers, Romani civilians, Gottschee Germans
Bezovica Mass Grave	Grobišče Bezovica	Bezovica	Vojnik	6	German and Slovene civilians
Big Brezar Shaft Mass Grave	Grobišče Veliko Brezarjevo brezno	Ljubljana	Ljubljana	Unknown	Slovene and Croatian soldiers and civilians
Big Mountain Deep Cave Mass Grave	Grobišče Globoka jama na Veliki gori	Ravni Dol	Sodražica	Unknown	Slovene civilians
Big Preval Cave Mass Grave	Grobišče Velika jama na Prevali	Naklo	Divača	Unknown	Slovene civilians
Big Ravine Mass Grave	Grobišče Velika Draga	Pance	Ljubljana	Unknown	Slovene civilians
Birch Mass Grave	Grobišče Pod brezo	Ravenska Vas	Zagorje ob Savi	Unknown	Unknown
Black Fields Mass Grave	Grobišče Črne njive	Ilirska Bistrica	Ilirska Bistrica	Unknown	German soldiers
Blaž Cave Mass Grave	Grobišče Blažetova jama	Tirna	Zagorje ob Savi	150	Unknown
Blessed Spring Mass Grave	Grobišče Žegnani studenec	Celje	Celje	Unknown	Civilians
Bliska Vas nad Polico Mass Grave	Grobišče Bliska vas nad Polico	Polica	Grosuplje	Unknown	Slovene civilians
Boating Club Mass Grave	Grobišče pri Brodarskem društvu	Podkraj	Hrastnik	Unknown	German soldiers
Bodjan Meadow Mass Grave	Grobišče na Bodjanovi njivi	Šoštanj	Šoštanj	Unknown	Slovene, Croatian, and German civilians
Bodovlje Mass Grave	Grobišče Bodovlje	Bodovlje	Škofja Loka	22–24	Slovene soldiers
Bohova Mass Grave	Grobišče Bohova	Bohova	Hoče-Slivnica	Unknown	Unknown
Boštanj Mass Grave / Boštanj Quarry Mass Grave	Grobišče Boštanj/Grobišče Kamnolom Boštanj	Log	Sevnica	14 or 200–300 (sources vary)	German or Croatian soldiers
Brajda Mass Grave	Grobišče Brajda	Dolenje pri Jelšanah	Ilirska Bistrica	6	German soldiers
Branček Grave	Grobišče Branček	Jelšane	Ilirska Bistrica	1	German soldier
Bratin Shaft Mass Grave	Grobišče Bratinov brezen	Predmeja	Ajdovščina	7	Slovene soldiers
Breg 1 Mass Grave	Grobišče Breg 1	Breg	Sevnica	9	Croatian soldiers
Breg 2 Mass Grave	Grobišče Breg 2	Breg	Sevnica	2	Croatian soldiers
Breg 3 Mass Grave	Grobišče Breg 2	Breg	Sevnica	3	Croatian soldiers
Breg Grave	Grobišče Breg	Smrje	Ilirska Bistrica	1	German soldier
Bremce Mass Grave	Grobišče Bremce	Bezovica	Koper	Unknown	Unknown
Brežine Mass Grave	Grobišče Brežine	Jelšane	Ilirska Bistrica	6	German soldiers
Breznica Grave	Grobišče Breznica	Breznica pod Lubnikom	Škofja Loka	1	Slovene civilian
Breznik Chapel-Shrine Mass Grave	Grobišče pri Breznikovi kapeli	Spodnja Kapla	Podvelka	6	Slovene civilians
Bričevka Mass Grave	Grobišče Bričevka	Grič pri Klevevžu	Šmarješke Toplice	> 80	Slovene and Romani civilians
Bricl Mass Grave	Grobišče Bricl	Selovec	Dravograd	5–12	Croatian soldiers
Britne Sele Mass Grave	Grobišče Britne sele	Pongrac	Žalec	Unknown	Unknown
Britof Mass Grave	Grobišče Britof	Britof	Kranj	2	Civilians
Brnica Mass Grave	Grobišče Brnica	Dol pri Hrastniku	Hrastnik	Unknown	Serbian and Slovene soldiers, Slovene civilians
Brus Ravine 1 Mass Grave	Grobišče Brusova grapa 1	Jelični Vrh	Idrija	1	Civilian
Brus Ravine 2 Mass Grave	Grobišče Brusova grapa 2	Jelični Vrh	Idrija	3–9	Unknown
Bukovje Cave Mass Grave	Grobišče Jama v Bukovju	Skadanščina	Hrpelje-Kozina	12	German soldiers
Bunker Mass Grave	Grobišče v zaklonišču	Krško	Krško	100	Croatian civilians
Bunker Mass Grave	Grobišče Bunker	Obrežje	Radeče	Unknown	Montenegrin soldiers
Č12 Cave Mass Grave	Grobišče Jama č12	Črnotiče	Koper	Unknown	Unknown
Castle Dance Floor Mass Grave	Grobišče Plesišče pri gradu	Škofja Loka	Škofja Loka	Unknown	Slovene soldiers and civilians
Castle Wall 1 Mass Grave	Grobišče pri grajskem obzidju 1	Vincarje	Škofja Loka	20	Slovene soldiers and civilians
Castle Wall 2 Mass Grave	Grobišče pri grajskem obzidju 2	Škofja Loka	Škofja Loka	5	Slovene soldiers and civilians
Castle Wall 3 Mass Grave	Grobišče pri grajskem obzidju 3	Škofja Loka	Škofja Loka	Unknown	Slovene soldiers and civilians
Castle Wall 4 Mass Grave	Grobišče pri grajskem obzidju 4	Škofja Loka	Škofja Loka	Unknown	Slovene soldiers and civilians
Castle Wall 5 Mass Grave	Grobišče pri grajskem obzidju 5	Škofja Loka	Škofja Loka	Unknown	Slovene soldiers and civilians
Castle Wall 6 Mass Grave	Grobišče pri grajskem obzidju 6	Škofja Loka	Škofja Loka	Unknown	Slovene soldiers and civilians
Čater Meadow 1 Mass Grave	Grobišče Grobišče na Čatrovem travniku 1	Bukovžlak	Celje	Unknown	Unknown
Čater Meadow 2 Mass Grave	Grobišče Grobišče na Čatrovem travniku 2	Bukovžlak	Celje	Unknown	Unknown
Cave 2 above Socerb Slope Mass Grave	Grobišče Jama 2 nad socerbskim klancem	Socerb	Koper	Unknown	Unknown
Cavrn Mass Grave	Grobišče Cavrn	Vešter	Škofja Loka	8	Slovene soldiers
Čebul Meadow Mass Grave	Grobišče Čebulov travnik	Šoštanj	Šoštanj	Unknown	Slovene, Croatian, and German civilians
Čelo Grave	Grob Čelo	Podbeže	Ilirska Bistrica	1	German soldier
Cemetery Grave	Grobišče na pokopališču	Bogojina	Moravske Toplice	1	German soldier
Cemetery Grave	Grobišče na pokopališču	Podgrad	Ilirska Bistrica	1	German soldier
Cemetery Mass Grave	Grobišče na pokopališču	Bovec	Bovec	Unknown	German soldiers
Cemetery Mass Grave	Grobišče na pokopališču	Dol pri Hrastniku	Hrastnik	17	German soldiers
Cemetery Mass Grave	Grobišče ob pokopališču	Harije	Ilirska Bistrica	4	German soldiers
Cemetery Mass Grave	Grobišče pod pokopališčem	Ilirska Bistrica	Ilirska Bistrica	82	German soldiers
Cemetery Mass Grave	Grobišče na pokopališču	Kobarid	Kobarid	11	German soldiers
Cemetery Mass Grave	Grobišče na pokopališč	Laško	Laško	Unknown	Croatian soldiers
Cemetery Mass Grave	Grobišče pri pokopališču	Stranice	Zreče	134	Croatian soldiers and civilians, Slovene civilians
Cemetery Mass Grave	Grobišče pri pokopališču	Teharje	Celje	130	German soldiers, Croatians
Cemetery Mass Grave	Grobišče pri pokopališču	Vipava	Vipava	8	Slovene civilians
Cemetery Mass Grave	Grobišče na pokopališču	Zgornja Kostrivnica	Rogaška Slatina	17	Unknown
Cemetery Wall Mass Grave	Grobišče za pokopališkim zidom	Jelšane	Ilirska Bistrica	Unknown	German soldiers
Čepovan Mass Grave	Grobišče Čepovan	Čepovan	Nova Gorica	5	Italian civilians
Četrtnik Cross Mass Grave	Grobišče četrtnikov križ	Spodnja Kapla	Podvelka	5	Slovene civilians
Christmas Valley Grave	Grob Božična vala	Jelšane	Ilirska Bistrica	1	German soldier
Church Grave	Grob pri cerkvi	Fabci	Ilirska Bistrica	1	Croatian civilian
Church Grave	Grob pri cerkvi	Jasen	Ilirska Bistrica	1	German soldier
Church Grave	Grobišče ob cerkvi	Vrhpolje	Vipava	1	German soldier
Church Mass Grave	Grobišče ob cerkvi	Brce	Ilirska Bistrica	8	German soldiers
Church Mass Grave	Grobišče ob cerkvi	Dobro Polje	Ilirska Bistrica	2	German soldiers
Church Mass Grave	Grobišče pri cerkvi	Veliko Brdo	Ilirska Bistrica	17	German soldiers
Čikečka Vas Grave	Grobišče Čikečka vas	Čikečka Vas	Moravske Toplice	1	Hungarian
Cirje 1 Mass Grave	Grobišče Cirje 1	Selo pri Pancah	Ljubljana	Unknown	Slovene civilians
Cirje 2 Mass Grave	Grobišče Cirje 2	Pance	Ljubljana	Unknown	Slovene civilians
Cirje 3 Mass Grave	Grobišče Cirje 3	Pance	Ljubljana	Unknown	Slovene civilians
Cirje 4 Mass Grave	Grobišče Cirje 4	Pance	Ljubljana	Unknown	Slovene civilians
Cirje 5 Mass Grave	Grobišče Cirje 5	Pance	Ljubljana	Unknown	Slovene civilians
Cirje Mass Grave	Grobišče Cirje	Pance	Ljubljana	Unknown	Slovene civilians
City Cemetery 1 Mass Grave	Grobišče na mestnem pokopališču 1	Celje	Celje	6	Unknown
City Cemetery 2 Mass Grave	Grobišče na mestnem pokopališču 2	Celje	Celje	Unknown	Unknown
City Cemetery 3 Mass Grave	Grobišče na mestnem pokopališču 3	Celje	Celje	Unknown	Unknown
Cold Valley Mass Grave	Grobišče Mrzla dolina	Hodoš	Hodoš	Unknown	Hungarian or German soldiers
Commons Grave	Grob Gmajna	Zarečje	Ilirska Bistrica	1	German soldier
Crngrob 1–5 mass graves	Grobišče Crngrob 1–5	Crngrob	Škofja Loka	200–300	Croatian soldiers and civilians, Slovene soldiers
Croatian Mass Grave	Grobišče Hrvatov	Muta	Muta	Unknown	Croatian soldiers
Crow Peak Shaft 2 Mass Grave	Grobišče Brezno 2 SZ od Vranjega vrha	Predgriže	Idrija	Unknown	Unknown
Cukala Shaft Mass Grave	Grobišče Cukalovo brezno	Pokojišče	Vrhnika	Unknown	Unknown
Cuzak Meadow Mass Grave	Grobišče Cuzakov travnik	Kamnik	Kamnik	> 200	Croatian and Serbian soldiers and civilians
Cvetrež 3 Shaft Mass Grave	Grobišče Brezen 3 pri Cvetrežu	Voglarji	Nova Gorica	Unknown	Slovene and Italian soldiers, Slovene and Italian civilians
Cvetrež Shaft Mass Grave	Grobišče Brezno za Cvetrežem	Voglarji	Nova Gorica	Unknown	Slovene and Italian soldiers, Slovene and Italian civilians
Danica Mansion Mass Grave	Grobišče pri vili Danica	Preddvor	Preddvor	Unknown	Unknown
Debelič Meadow near Kren Cave Mass Grave	Grobišče Debliške livade pri Jami pod Krenom	Onek	Kočevje	Unknown	Croatian, Serbian, German, and Russian soldiers
Dobovec Mass Grave	Grobišče Dobovec	Dobovec	Trbovlje	Unknown	Unknown
Dobrava Mass Grave	Grobišče pod Dobravo	Sevnica	Sevnica	Unknown	German soldiers
Dobruška Vas Mass Grave	Grobišče Dobruška vas	Dobruška Vas	Škocjan	62	Croatians
Dol pri Šmarjeti Grave	Grobišče Dol pri Šmarjeti	Dol pri Šmarjeti	Šmarješke Toplice	1	Civilian
Dolski Plac Mass Grave	Grobišče Dolski plac	Kamniška Bistrica	Kamnik	Unknown	Croatians
Double Shaft by Cink Cross Mass Grave	Grobišče Dvojno brezno pri Cink križu	Cink	Dolenjske Toplice	Unknown	Slovene soldiers
Družmirje 1 and 2 mass graves	Grobišče Družmirje 1, 2	Družmirje	Šoštanj	Unknown	Slovene, Croatian, and German civilians
Dula Mass Grave	Grobišče Dula	Dolnji Zemon	Ilirska Bistrica	8	German soldiers
Enclosure Grave	Grob Ograda	Brce	Ilirska Bistrica	1	German soldier
Farbečkina Mass Grave	Grobišče Farbečkina	Dolenje pri Jelšanah	Ilirska Bistrica	2	German soldiers
Firing Trench below Čehovec Hill Mass Grave	Grobišče strelski jarek pod hribom Čehovec	Bistrica ob Sotli	Bistrica ob Sotli	Unknown	Croatian soldiers and civilians
Florian Street Mass Grave	Grobišče ob Florjanski ulici	Sevnica	Sevnica	Unknown	Unknown
Flower Hill Mass Grave	Grobišče Cvetlični hrib	Rogaška Slatina	Rogaška Slatina	Unknown	Unknown
Fly Cave Mass Grave	Grobišče Mušja jama	Naklo	Divača	Unknown	Slovene civilians
Foxtail Mass Grave	Grobišče Lisičji rep	Mošnje	Radovljica	Unknown	German soldiers
Fram Mass Grave	Grobišče Fram	Fram	Rače-Fram	Unknown	Slovene civilians
Frkovec Mass Grave	Grobišče Frkovec	Trpčane	Ilirska Bistrica	4 or 20	German soldiers
Fuks 1 and 2 mass graves	Grobišče Fuks 1	Pameče	Slovenj Gradec	Unknown	Croatians
Funeral Chapel Mass Grave	Grobišče pri pokopališki vežici	Laško	Laško	Unknown	Croatian soldiers
Gas Station Mass Grave	Grobišče pri bencinskem servisu	Podkraj	Hrastnik	Unknown	Civilians
German Sinkhole Mass Grave	Grobišče Nemški vrtec	Kuteževo	Ilirska Bistrica	20	German soldiers
Gmajna Tree Nursery Mass Grave	Grobišče v drevesnici na Gmajni	Stari Trg	Slovenj Gradec	3	Croatians
Golak Mass Grave	Grobišče Golak	Šembije	Ilirska Bistrica	12	German soldiers
Golčman Farm Mass Grave	Grobišče pri domačiji Golčman	Gornji Dolič	Mislinja	3	Croatian soldiers
Golo Mass Grave	Grobišče Golo	Golo	Ig	Unknown	Slovene soldiers
Golobivnica Cave Mass Grave	Grobišče Jama Golobivnica	Prelože pri Lokvi	Sežana	250	Civilians
Gorge Mass Grave	Grobišče Soteska	Vešter	Škofja Loka	6–10	Slovene soldiers and civilians
Gorge Peak Mass Grave	Grobišče Vrh Soteske	Križna Gora	Škofja Loka	4	Slovene civilians
Gorica 1–4 mass graves	Grobišče Gorica 1	Šoštanj	Šoštanj	Unknown	Slovene, Croatian, and German civilians
Goriče Mass Grave	Grobišče Goriče	Goriče	Kranj	40	German soldiers
Gornji Dolič 1–3 mass graves	Grobišče Gornji Dolič 1–3	Gornji Dolič	Mislinja	80–100	Croatian soldiers and civilians
Gortnar Shrine Mass Grave	Grobišče pri Gortnarjevi kapelici	Šmartno pri Slovenj Gradcu	Slovenj Gradec	30–36	Croatian soldiers
Gradac Grave	Grob Gradac	Račice	Ilirska Bistrica	1	German soldier
Gradišnica Cave Mass Grave	Grobišče Jama Gradišnica	Logatec	Logatec	2–5	Unknown
Grahovica Mass Grave	Grobišče ob Grahovici	Vrh pri Boštanju	Sevnica	Unknown	Croatian soldiers
Gravel Pit Mass Grave	Grobišče v peskokopu	Spodnje Gorje	Gorje	20	German nurses
Griže Mass Grave	Grobišče Griže	Pongrac	Žalec	80–100	Slovene soldiers
Grobnica Mass Grave	Grobišče Grobnica	Kozarišče	Loška Dolina	Unknown	Unknown
Gustav Mine Mass Grave	Grobišče rudnik Gustav	Leše	Prevalje	100	Austrian and Slovene civilians
Hadrovec Mass Grave	Grobišče Hadrovec	Kuteževo	Ilirska Bistrica	20	German soldiers
Hafnar Ravine Mass Grave	Grobišče Hafnarjev graben	Brestanica	Krško	186, 20–30	Croatian and Serbian soldiers, Slovene civilians
Halužan Mass Grave	Grobišče pod Halužanom	Pongrac	Žalec	Unknown	Unknown
Hasenbichl Mine Mass Grave	Grobišče Hasenbichlov rudnik	Polajna	Zreče	Unknown	Croatian soldiers and civilians
Hayfields Mass Grave	Grobišče Senožeta	Mošnje	Radovljica	Unknown	German soldiers
Hbt Grave	Grob Hbt	Fabci	Ilirska Bistrica	1	German soldier
Herlah Farm Mass Grave	Grobišče pri domačiji Herlah	Završe	Mislinja	10–20	Unknown
Hmezad Mass Grave	Grobišče Hmezad	Šmarjeta pri Celju	Celje	19	German and Cossack soldiers
Hmezad Mass Grave	Grobišče Hmezad	Vojnik	Vojnik	100	Croatian soldiers and civilians
Hočko Pohorje Mass Grave	Grobišče Hočko Pohorje	Hočko Pohorje	Hoče-Slivnica	Unknown	Unknown
Homšnica Creek by the Klemen Farm Mass Grave	Grobišče ob Homšnici pri Klemenu	Šmartno pri Slovenj Gradcu	Slovenj Gradec	10	Unknown
House No. 1 Grave	Grobišče pri hiši številka 1	Dolenje pri Jelšanah	Ilirska Bistrica	1	German soldier
House No. 8 Grave	Grobišče pri hiši številka 8	Dolenje pri Jelšanah	Ilirska Bistrica	1	German soldier
House No. 8a Mass Grave	Grobišče pri hiši 8a	Drensko Rebro	Kozje	Unknown	Croatian soldiers
House No. 35 Mass Grave	Grobišče pri hiši 35	Bukovska Vas	Dravograd	Unknown	Croatians
House No. 143 Mass Grave	Grobišče pri hiši 143	Šmartno pri Slovenj Gradcu	Slovenj Gradec	10	Unknown
Hraste Mass Grave	Grobišče na Hrastah	Sevnica	Sevnica	Unknown	Unknown
Hrbe Grave	Grobišče Hrbe	Veliko Brdo	Ilirska Bistrica	1	German soldier
Hrebeh Grave	Grobišče Hrebeh	Veliko Brdo	Ilirska Bistrica	1	German soldier
Hrib Mass Grave	Grobišče Hrib	Dolnji Zemon	Ilirska Bistrica	2	German soldiers
Hrušica 1 and 2 mass graves	Grobišče Hrušica 1, 2	Hrušica	Jesenice	Unknown	Slovene soldiers
Hrušica No. 56 Mass Grave	Grobišče za hišo Hrušica 56	Hrušica	Jesenice	Unknown	Slovene soldiers
Huda Jama Mass Grave	Grobišče Huda jama	Huda Jama	Laško	> 3,000	Slovene soldiers and civilians, Croatian soldiers
Hunting Lodge Mass Grave	Grobišče za Lovsko kočo	Knezdol	Trbovlje	Unknown	Unknown
Hunting Lodge Mass Grave	Grobišče pri lovskem domu	Sušak	Ilirska Bistrica	Unknown	German soldiers
Ilovce Mass Grave	Grobišče Ilovce	Veliko Brdo	Ilirska Bistrica	7	German soldiers
Italian Soldiers Mass Grave	Grobišče italijanskih vojakov	Bukovec	Velike Lašče	Unknown	Italian soldiers
Jamnik Woods Mass Grave	Grobišče Jamnikov gozd	Velike Lašče	Velike Lašče	Unknown	Slovene civilians and soldiers
Janez Klančar Grave	Grob Janeza Klančarja	Selo pri Robu	Velike Lašče	1	Slovene
Janez Mlinar Mass Grave	Grobišče Mlinarjev Janez	Teharje	Celje	6,000	Slovene and Croatian soldiers, German and Slovene civilians
Janez Pirmanšek Grave	Grob Janeza Pirmanška	Šoštanj	Šoštanj	1	Slovene civilian
Janž Cave Mass Grave	Grobišče Janževa jama	Leše	Prevalje	100	Austrian and Slovene civilians
Jasen Mass Grave	Grobišče Jasen	Jasen	Ilirska Bistrica	98	German soldiers
Jasen No. 4 Grave	Grob pri hiši Jasen 4	Jasen	Ilirska Bistrica	1	German soldier
Jasen No. 11 Mass Grave	Grobišče pri hiši Jasen 11	Jasen	Ilirska Bistrica	3–4	German soldiers
Jastrebenca Cave Mass Grave	Grobišče jama Jastrebenca	Gornja Lokvica	Metlika	Unknown	Unknown
Jate Shaft Mass Grave	Grobišče Brezno na Jatah	Ravne v Bohinju	Bohinj	2	Unknown
Jeglijenek Meadow Mass Grave	Grobišče Jeglijenkov travnik	Selovec	Dravograd	2	Croatian and Cossack soldier
Jelenca Mass Grave	Grobišče Jelenca	Strelac	Šmarješke Toplice	6	Unknown
Jelendol Mass Grave	Grobišče Jelendol	Jelendol	Ribnica	119	Slovene soldiers
Jelenov Žleb Shaft Mass Grave	Grobišče Brezno v Jelenovem Žlebu	Jelenov Žleb	Ribnica	Unknown	Italian soldiers
Jernak Pond Mass Grave	Grobišče Mlaka pri Jernakovih	Zabiče	Ilirska Bistrica	3	German soldiers
Jevnik Mass Grave	Grobišče Jevnik	Sidol	Kamnik	Unknown	Croatian soldiers and civilians, Slovenes
Jevšnik Farm Shrine Mass Grave	Grobišče ob kapelici pri domačiji Jevšnik	Dovže	Mislinja	3	Unknown
Jezerce Mass Grave	Grobišče Jezerce	Javorniški Rovt	Jesenice	9	Slovene soldiers
Jošč Shaft Mass Grave	Grobišče Joščevo brezno	Grgar	Nova Gorica	Unknown	Unknown
Jure Saddle 1–3 mass graves	Jurjevo sedlo 1–3	Frajhajm	Slovenska Bistrica	Unknown	Civilians and soldiers
Jurjevci Mass Grave	Grobišče Jurjevci	Grič pri Klevevžu	Šmarješke Toplice	> 80	Slovene and Romani civilians
Kačja Rid Mass Grave	Grobišče Kačja Rid	Grič pri Klevevžu	Šmarješke Toplice	> 80	Slovene and Romani civilians
Kamna Gora Mass Grave	Grobišče Kamna Gora	Kamna Gora	Slovenske Konjice	14	Slovene soldiers
Kaser Cave Mass Grave	Grobišče Kaserova jama	Obrov	Hrpelje-Kozina	Unknown	German soldiers, Slovene civilians
King's Hill Mass Grave	Grobišče Kraljev hrib	Kamniška Bistrica	Kamnik	Unknown	Croatians
Klečet Grave	Grobišče Klečet	Zarečje	Ilirska Bistrica	1	German soldier
Klemenca Mass Grave	Grobišče Klemenca	Škemljevec	Metlika	6	Slovene civilians
Klevevž 1 Mass Grave	Grobišče Klevevž 1	Grič pri Klevevžu	Šmarješke Toplice	30	Slovene and Romani civilians
Klevevž 2 Mass Grave	Grobišče Klevevž 2	Grič pri Klevevžu	Šmarješke Toplice	> 20	Slovene and Romani civilians
Klevevž 3 Mass Grave	Grobišče Klevevž 3	Grič pri Klevevžu	Šmarješke Toplice	> 20	Slovene and Romani civilians
Ključ 1 and 2 mass graves	Grobišče na Ključu 1	Brezje pri Dobrovi	Dobrova-Polhov Gradec	3	Civilians
Klukec Mass Grave	Grobišče Klukec	Celje	Celje	Unknown	Unknown
Kočna Mass Grave	Grobišče Kočna	Kočna	Jesenice	40	German soldiers
Kolen Cave Mass Grave	Grobišče Kolen jama	Cerovec pri Šmarju	Šmarje pri Jelšah	Unknown	Slovene civilians
Konfin Shaft 1 Mass Grave	Grobišče Brezno pri Konfinu 1	Glažuta	Loški Potok	88	Slovene, Croatian, and Serbian soldiers
Konfin Shaft 2 Mass Grave	Grobišče Brezno pri Konfinu 2	Glažuta	Loški Potok	Unknown	Slovene soldiers
Kopišča 1 and 2 mass graves	Grobišče Kopišča 1, 2	Kamniška Bistrica	Kamnik	Unknown	Croatian soldiers
Koprivnik Mass Grave	Grobišče Koprivnik	Žažar	Horjul	Unknown	Slovene civilians
Korita Cavern Mass Grave	Grobišče Kaverna v Koritah	Korita na Krasu	Miren-Kostanjevica	Unknown	Unknown
Koščak Hill Mass Grave	Grobišče Koščakov hrib	Grosuplje	Grosuplje	15	Slovene soldiers
Kosec Shaft Mass Grave	Grobišče Koščevo brezno	Gornji Ig	Ig	> 20	Slovene soldiers and civilians
Košovec Shaft Mass Grave	Grobišče Brezno na Košovcu	Logatec	Logatec	Unknown	German soldiers, civilians
Kot Mass Grave	Grobišče Kot	Srednji Dolič	Mislinja	Unknown	Croatian soldiers
Kotar Enclosure Cave Mass Grave	Grobišče Jama pod Kotarjevo ogrado	Slope	Hrpelje-Kozina	15–17	German soldiers, Slovene civilians
Kovač Shaft Mass Grave	Grobišče Kovačevo brezno	Brezje	Cerknica	Unknown	Unknown
Kozamurnik Farm Mass Grave	Grobišče posestvo Kozamurnikovih	Bele Vode	Šoštanj	13	Ukrainian soldiers
Koželj Mass Grave	Grobišče Koželj	Velenje	Velenje	Unknown	Slovene civilian
Kozjak Road Mass Grave	Grobišče ob cesti na Kozjak	Gornji Dolič	Mislinja	10–20	Croatian soldiers
Kozlovka Cave Mass Grave	Grobišče Jama Kozlovka	Kozarišče	Loška Dolina	Unknown	Slovene soldiers
Kračali 1 Grave	Grobišče Kračali 1	Kračali	Sodražica	Unknown	Unknown
Kračali 2 Grave	Grobišče Kračali 2	Kračali	Sodražica	1	Unknown
Krajc Peak Cave Mass Grave	Grobišče Jama v Krajčjem vrhu	Ravni Dol	Sodražica	Unknown	Slovene civilians
Krajcer Farm Mass Grave	Grobišče pri domačiji Krajcer	Gornji Dolič	Mislinja	Unknown	Croatian soldiers
Krakovo Forest 1 Mass Grave	Grobišče Krakovski gozd 1	Sajevce	Kostanjevica na Krki	4,000 (with following)	Croatian soldiers and civilians, German soldiers
Krakovo Forest 2 Mass Grave	Grobišče Krakovski gozd 2	Kostanjevica na Krki	Kostanjevica na Krki	4,000 (with preceding)	Croatian soldiers and civilians, German soldiers
Kregar Ravine 1–12 mass graves	Grobišče Kregarjev graben 1–12	Marija Reka	Prebold	> 2,000	Slovene and Croatian civilians, German soldiers
Kren Cave Mass Grave	Grobišče Jama pod Krenom	Onek	Kočevje	Unknown	Croatian, Serbian, German, and Cossack soldiers
Krim Cave Mass Grave	Grobišče Krimska jama	Brezovica pri Borovnici	Borovnica	Unknown	Slovene civilians
Krištandol Mass Grave	Grobišče Krištandol	Marno	Hrastnik	Unknown	Unknown
Križna Gora Grave	Grobišče Križna Gora	Križna Gora	Škofja Loka	1	Slovene civilian
Krnice Mass Grave	Grobišče Krnice	Gornji Zemon	Ilirska Bistrica	150	German soldiers
Krpin Gravel Pit 1 and 2 mass graves	Grobišče peskokop Krpin 1, 2	Begunje na Gorenjskem	Radovljica	20	Russian soldiers, civilians
Krpin Ski Slope 1–3 mass graves	Grobišče smučišče Krpin 1–3	Begunje na Gorenjskem	Radovljica	Unknown	Russian soldiers, civilians
Kršnjak Mass Grave	Grobišče Kršnjak	Jelšane	Ilirska Bistrica	6	German soldiers
Kucja Valley Mass Grave	Grobišče v Kucji dolini	Ljubljana	Ljubljana	Unknown	Slovene and Croatian soldiers and civilians, German soldiers
Kuhar Woods Mass Grave	Grobišče Kuharjev boršt	Žeje pri Komendi	Komenda	10–15	Unknown
Kupnica Mass Grave	Grobišče Kupnica	Novokračine	Ilirska Bistrica	82	German soldiers
Kutner Ravine Mass Grave	Grobišče Kutnerjev greben	Rogatec	Rogatec	Unknown	Hungarians and Ukrainians
Lahomno No. 62 Mass Grave	Grobišče pri hiši Lahomno 62	Lahomno	Laško	3	Unknown
Lahomščica 1 Grave	Grobišče ob Lahomščici 1	Lahomno	Laško	1	Croatian soldier
Lahomščica 2 Grave	Grobišče ob Lahomščici 2	Lahomno	Laško	1	Croatian soldier
Lahomščica 3 Mass Grave	Grobišče ob Lahomščici 3	Lahomno	Laško	7	Croatian soldiers
Lajše Mass Grave	Grobišče Lajše	Cerkno	Cerkno	14	Slovene civilians
Lancovo 1 and 2 mass graves	Grobišče Lancovo 1, 2	Zgornja Lipnica	Radovljica	Unknown	Civilians, Croatian soldiers
Larch Hill Cave Mass Grave	Grobišče Jama pod Macesnovo gorico	Trnovec	Kočevje	3,200	Slovene and other soldiers
Larch Hill Rock Shelter Mass Grave	Grobišče Spodmol pri Macesnovi gorici	Trnovec	Kočevje	Unknown	Unknown
Laze Mass Grave	Grobišče Laze	Harije	Ilirska Bistrica	3–4	German soldiers
Lebe Clearing 1–3 mass graves	Lebejeva frata 1–3	Slivniško Pohorje	Hoče-Slivnica	Unknown	Civilians and soldiers
Ledenica near Planinca Mass Grave	Grobišče Ledenica pri Planinci	Planinca	Brezovica	Unknown	Unknown
Ledina Mass Grave	Grobišče Ledina	Ledina	Sevnica	5	German soldiers
Lehen Mass Grave	Grobišče Lehen	Lehen na Pohorju	Podvelka	8	Slovene civilians
Lesce 1 Mass Grave	Grobišče Lesce 1	Hlebce	Radovljica	33	Russian soldiers
Lesce 2 Mass Grave	Grobišče Lesce 2	Hlebce	Radovljica	3	Russian soldiers
Leše 1 and 2 mass graves	Grobišče Leše 1, 2	Leše	Prevalje	100	Austrian and Slovene civilians
Liboje Pond Mass Grave	Grobišče ribnik Liboje	Zabukovica	Žalec	Unknown	Unknown
Linden Grave	Grob pri lipi	Trpčane	Ilirska Bistrica	1	German soldier
Liplje Cave Mass Grave	Grobišče Lipeljska jama	Planina	Postojna	Unknown	Unknown
Lipica Shaft Mass Grave	Grobišče Lipiško brezno	Lipica	Sežana	Unknown	Unknown
Lipovšek Meadow Mass Grave	Grobišče Lipovškov travnik	Medlog	Celje	400	Croatian civilians
Little Bridge Grave	Grob pri mostiču	Jelšane	Ilirska Bistrica	1	Italian soldier
Ločica Mass Grave	Grobišče Ločica	Dolnji Zemon	Ilirska Bistrica	22	German soldiers
Ločice 1 Mass Grave	Grobišče Ločice 1	Smrje	Ilirska Bistrica	2	German soldiers
Ločice 2 Mass Grave	Grobišče Ločice 2	Smrje	Ilirska Bistrica	10–11	German soldiers
Log Mass Grave	Grobišče Log	Log	Sevnica	4 or 200–300 (sources vary)	German or Croatian soldiers
Logarček Shaft Grave	Grobišče Brezno Logarček	Laze	Logatec	1	Slovene civilian
Loka Mass Grave	Grobišče Loka	Ribnica	Pivka	31	German soldiers
Loka Castle Yard Mass Grave	Grobišče na vrtu loškega gradu	Škofja Loka	Škofja Loka	Unknown	Slovene soldiers and civilians
Lokavec Mass Grave	Grobišče Lokavec	Lokavec	Ajdovščina	5–7	Slovene civilians
Lokva Mass Grave	Grobišče Pri Lokvi	Jelšane	Ilirska Bistrica	6	German soldiers
Lokve Mass Grave	Grobišče Lokve	Lokve	Nova Gorica	Unknown	Italian soldiers
Lončarjev Dol 1 Mass Grave	Grobišče Lončarjev dol 1	Pečje	Sevnica	20–30	Croatian soldiers
Lončarjev Dol 2 Mass Grave	Grobišče Lončarjev dol 2	Pečje	Sevnica	Unknown	Unknown
Lovrec House Mass Grave	Grobišče Lovrčeva hiša	Vešter	Škofja Loka	8	Slovene soldiers
Lovrenc Ravine 1 Mass Grave	Grobišče Lovrenška grapa 1	Gabrovo	Škofja Loka	7	German soldiers
Lovrenc Ravine 2 Mass Grave	Grobišče Lovrenška grapa 2	Gabrovo	Škofja Loka	20	Slovene soldiers
Lower Creek Mass Grave	Grobišče Dolenji potok	Dolnji Zemon	Ilirska Bistrica	Unknown	German soldiers
Lower Videm Mass Grave	Grobišče pod Vidmom	Kralji	Kočevje	Unknown	Unknown
Lukanja Mass Grave	Grobišče Lukanja	Lukanja	Slovenska Bistrica	40	German soldiers
Lukovnik 1 Mass Grave	Grobišče Lukovnik 1	Čužnja Vas	Mokronog-Trebelno	20	Civilians
Lukovnik 2 Grave	Grobišče Lukovnik 2	Čužnja Vas	Mokronog-Trebelno	1	Slovene soldier
Macesnovec Mass Grave	Grobišče Macesnovec	Kamniška Bistrica	Kamnik	Unknown	Croatian soldiers
Mačkovec Mass Grave	Grobišče Mačkovec	Bukovec	Velike Lašče	40	Slovene soldiers
Makec Ravine 1 and 2 mass graves	Grobišče Makčeva grapa 1, 2	Gorenja Trebuša	Tolmin	30	Slovene soldiers
Mala Vas Mass Grave	Grobišče Mala vas	Mala Vas	Dobrepolje	8	Civilians
Marno Mass Grave	Grobišče Marno	Marno	Hrastnik	> 200	Slovene soldiers and civilians
Marsh Mass Grave	Grobišče Čreta	Mali Kamen	Krško	20–30	Croatian soldiers
Marsh Mass Grave	Grobišče Čret	Veliki Kamen	Krško	20	Croatian soldiers
Martinčič Family Grave	Grob Martinčičeve družine	Babna Gora	Dobrova–Polhov Gradec	9	Civilians
Martinove Hrastnice Shaft Mass Grave	Grobišče Brezen v Martinovih Hrastnicah	Bukovje	Postojna	7	German soldiers
Mass Grave 1	Grobišče 1	Košnica pri Celju	Celje	400–600	Slovene and German civilians
Mass Grave 2	Grobišče 2	Košnica pri Celju	Celje	400–600	Slovene and German civilians
Mass Grave 3	Grobišče 3	Košnica pri Celju	Celje	600–1,000	Slovene and German civilians
Materija 1 Mass Grave	Grobišče Materija 1	Bač pri Materiji	Hrpelje-Kozina	Unknown	Unknown
Matevž Shaft Mass Grave	Grobišče Matevževo brezno	Bezuljak	Cerknica	Unknown	Unknown
Matjaž Cave Mass Grave	Grobišče Matjaževa jama	Pevno	Škofja Loka	Unknown	Slovene soldiers
Matjaž Shaft Mass Grave	Grobišče Matjaževo brezno	Dobec	Cerknica	3	Civilians
Matjaž Valley Mass Grave	Grobišče Matjaževa dolina	Vešter	Škofja Loka	8	Slovene soldiers
Mazevec Crevasse Mass Grave	Grobišče Mazevčev pruh	Begunje na Gorenjskem	Radovljica	Unknown	German soldiers, civilians
Meadow 1 and 2 mass graves	Grobišče Na trati 1, 2	Spodnje Gorje	Gorje	Unknown	Civilians
Meadow Barrier Mass Grave	Grobišče v pregradi Za travnikom	Bukovžlak	Celje	Unknown	Unknown
Meadow Shaft 1 Mass Grave	Grobišče Brezno na trati 1	Spodnje Gorje	Gorje	3	German soldiers
Medved Farm Mass Grave	Grobišče pri Medvedovi domačiji	Podgorje	Kamnik	6	Unknown
Medvedovše Grave	Grob Medvedovše	Predmeja	Ajdovščina	1	Slovene soldier
Medvedovše Shaft Mass Grave	Grobišče Brezno za Medvedovšem	Predmeja	Ajdovščina	Unknown	Unknown
Miha's Hill Mass Grave	Grobišče Miha hrib	Selo pri Pancah	Ljubljana	Unknown	Slovene civilians
Mihec Shaft Mass Grave	Grobišče Mihcovo brezno	Dobec	Cerknica	3	Civilians
Mihovec Cave Mass Grave	Grobišče Mihovska jama	Uršna Sela	Novo Mesto	14–17	Slovenes
Mihovec Chasm above Šuštarček Meadow Mass Grave	Grobišče Mihovska prepadna nad Šuštarčkovo košenico	Uršna Sela	Novo Mesto	14–17	Slovenes
Military Cemetery Mass Grave	Grobišče na vojaškem pokopališču	Vipava	Vipava	15	Chetnik soldiers
Military Depot Mass Grave	Grobišča na območju vojaških skladišč	Bukovžlak	Celje	Unknown	Unknown
Miljavec Shaft Mass Grave	Grobišče Miljavčev brezen	Grgar	Nova Gorica	Unknown	Slovene and Italian soldiers and civilians
Mine Tailings Mass Grave	Grobišče pod rudniško jalovino	Polajna	Zreče	Unknown	Croatian soldiers and civilians
Mirnik Woods Mass Grave	Grobišče Mirnikov gozd	Novo Tepanje	Slovenske Konjice	Unknown	Gottschee Germans, Slovene civilians
Mirnik Woods 2 Mass Grave	Grobišče Mirnikov gozd 2	Novo Tepanje	Slovenske Konjice	Unknown	Gottschee Germans
Mislinjska Dobrava Mass Grave	Grobišče Mislinjska Dobrava	Mislinjska Dobrava	Slovenj Gradec	Unknown	Croatian or Cossack soldiers
Mlačca Mass Grave	Grobišče Mlačca	Dolnji Zemon	Ilirska Bistrica	3	German soldiers
Mlačca Mass Grave	Grobišče Mlačca	Mojstrana	Kranjska Gora	10–20	German soldiers
Mlake Lake Mass Grave	Grobišče pri jezeru v Mlakah	Harije	Ilirska Bistrica	4	German soldiers
Mostec II Sava River Mass Grave	Mostec II – Grobišče ob Savi	Mostec	Brežice	Unknown	Croatian and Slovene soldiers and civilians
Mount Vina 1 and 2 mass graves	Grobišče pod hribom Vina gora 1, 2	Ples	Bistrica ob Sotli	25	Unknown
Mountain Fields Mass Grave	Grobišče Njivce v gorah	Jablanica	Ilirska Bistrica	10	German soldiers
Mountain Mass Grave	Grobišče Gora	Jablanica	Ilirska Bistrica	10	German soldiers
Movže 1 and 2 mass graves	Grobišče Movže 1, 2	Mislinja	Mislinja	Unknown	Croatian soldiers and civilians
Mozelj Mass Grave	Grobišče Mozelj	Mozelj	Kočevje	110	Chetnik soldiers and others
Mrtvice Mass Grave	Grobišče Mrtvice	Mrtvice	Krško	> 100	Croatian soldiers, civilians
Municipal Dump Mass Grave	Grobišča pod komunalno deponijo	Bukovžlak	Celje	Unknown	Unknown
Municipal Dump Mass Grave	Grobišče pod komunalno deponijo	Tuncovec	Rogaška Slatina	Unknown	Croatians
Muretovina 1 Mass Grave	Grobišče Muretovina 1	Sopotnica	Škofja Loka	7	Slovene soldiers
Muretovina 2 Mass Grave	Grobišče Muretovina 2	Sopotnica	Škofja Loka	17	Slovene soldiers
Naveršnik Farm Mass Grave	Grobišče pri domačiji Naveršnik	Gornji Dolič	Mislinja	Unknown	Civilians
Nevinje Cave Mass Grave	Grobišče Nevinje jama	Vrh	Loška Dolina	Unknown	Slovenes
New Fire Station Mass Grave	Grobišče pri novem gasilskem domu	Bistrica ob Sotli	Bistrica ob Sotli	Unknown	Croatian soldiers and civilians
Nogradec 1 Mass Grave	Grobišče Nogradec 1	Prem	Ilirska Bistrica	23	German soldiers
Nogradec 2 Grave	Grobišče Nogradec 2	Prem	Ilirska Bistrica	1	German soldier
Nova Oprema Woods Mass Grave	Grobišče v gozdu za Novo opremo	Stari Trg	Slovenj Gradec	20	Croatians (civilian/military status uncertain)
Oce Mass Grave	Grobišče Oce	Bele Vode	Šoštanj	13	Ukrainian soldiers
Old Fire Station Mass Grave	Grobišče pri starem gasilskem domu	Bistrica ob Sotli	Bistrica ob Sotli	Unknown	Croatian soldiers and civilians
Old Hrastnik Mass Grave	Grobišče Stari Hrastnik	Dol pri Hrastniku	Hrastnik	Unknown	Serbian and Slovene soldiers, Slovene civilians
Olešče Mass Grave	Grobišče Olešče	Olešče	Laško	14	Croatian soldiers
Oplotje Cave Mass Grave	Grobišče Jama Oplotje	Logarji	Velike Lašče	Unknown	Unknown
Orel Peak Mass Grave	Grobišče Orlov vrh	Ljubljana	Ljubljana	146	Slovene soldiers
Otavice Pig Shaft Mass Grave	Grobišče Otaviško svinjsko brezno	Otavice	Ribnica	Unknown	Unknown
Pap-Hegy Crossroads Grave	Grob pri križišču za Pap-hegy	Dobrovnik	Dobrovnik	1	German soldier
Pap-Hegy Göntér Cellar Grave	Grob pri Göntérjevi kleti Pap-hegy	Dobrovnik	Dobrovnik	1	German soldier
Paradise Valley Mass Grave	Grobišče Rajska dolina	Kal	Hrastnik	> 80	Slovene civilians
Parish Shed Mass Grave	Grobišče v farovški loži	Črnomelj	Črnomelj	Unknown	Unknown
Parking Lot Mass Grave	Grobišče na parkirišču	Rogatec	Rogatec	2	Soldiers (nationality uncertain)
Parti Grave	Grob Parti	Studena Gora	Ilirska Bistrica	1	German soldier
Partovec Mass Grave	Grobišče Partovec	Markečica	Oplotnica	Unknown	German soldiers
Pasture 1 Grave	Grobišče Planina 1	Kračali	Sodražica	Unknown	Unknown
Pasture 2 Grave	Grobišče Planina 2	Kračali	Sodražica	1	Unknown
Pavlin Shaft Mass Grave	Grobišče Pavlinovo brezno	Sekirišče	Velike Lašče	Unknown	Unknown
Pečovnik Mass Grave	Grobišče Pečovnik	Zvodno	Celje	5,000–10,000	Unknown
Pekel Grave	Grobišče Pekel	Spodnja Kapla	Podvelka	1	Austrian civilian
Peter Ravine Mass Grave	Grobišče Petrova grapa	Gorenja Trebuša	Tolmin	Unknown	Civilians
Petrinci Commons 1 Mass Grave	Grobišče Petrinjska gmajna 1	Kržeti	Sodražica	120–150	Russian soldiers
Petrinci Commons 2 Mass Grave	Grobišče Petrinjska gmajna 2	Kržeti	Sodražica	Unknown	Unknown
Pikec Valley Mass Grave	Grobišče pri Pikčevi dolini	Vrhnika	Vrhnika	6	German soldiers
Pine Shaft Mass Grave	Grobišče Brezno v borovcih	Postojna	Postojna	Unknown	Unknown
Pintarca Mass Grave	Grobišče Pintarca	Gradnik	Semič	4–6	Unknown
Pit A Mass Grave	Grobišče v rovu A	Zgornja Bistrica	Slovenska Bistrica	231	Civilians
Pit B Mass Grave	Grobišče v rovu B	Zgornja Bistrica	Slovenska Bistrica	200	Civilians
Planina Mass Grave	Grobišče Planina	Kranj	Kranj	Unknown	Unknown
Pleščica Mass Grave	Grobišče Pleščica	Kuteževo	Ilirska Bistrica	8	German soldiers
Pocket Cave Mass Grave	Grobišče Žepna jama	Podstenice	Dolenjske Toplice	Unknown	Civilians, soldiers
Podbeže No. 40 Grave	Grobišče Podbeže 40	Sabonje	Ilirska Bistrica	1	German soldier
Podgomila Shaft Mass Grave	Grobišče Brezno Podgomila	Grgar	Nova Gorica	Unknown	Slovene and Italian soldiers and civilians
Podgorje 1 Mass Grave	Grobišče Podgorje 1	Podgorje	Kamnik	6	Unknown
Podgorje 2–4 mass graves	Grobišče Podgorje 2–4	Podgorje	Kamnik	Unknown	Croatian soldiers
Podgorje 6 Cave Mass Grave	Grobišče Jama Podgorje 6	Podgorje	Koper	Unknown	Unknown
Podgriva Ravine Mass Grave	Grobišče Podgrivška grapa	Gorenja Trebuša	Tolmin	Unknown	Civilians
Podnjive Mass Grave	Grobišče Podnjive	Dolnji Zemon	Ilirska Bistrica	Unknown	German soldiers
Podtrn Mass Grave	Grobišče Podtrn	Trnje	Škofja Loka	7	Slovene soldiers
Pohar Meadow Mass Grave	Grobišče Poharjev travnik	Selo pri Žirovnici	Žirovnica	6	Croatian soldiers
Polajna Mine Mass Grave	Grobišče rudnik Polajna	Polajna	Zreče	Unknown	Croatian soldiers and civilians
Polica Mass Grave	Grobišče Polica	Polica	Grosuplje	20	Slovene civilians
Poliščice Mass Grave	Grobišče Poliščice	Kuteževo	Ilirska Bistrica	8	German soldiers
Poljana Mass Grave	Grobišče Poljana	Poljana	Prevalje	Unknown	Croatian soldiers, civilians
Poljane nad Jesenicami Mass Grave	Grobišče Poljane nad Jesenicami	Kočna	Jesenice	40	German soldiers
Pond Mass Grave	Grobišče na ribniku	Cerovec pri Šmarju	Šmarje pri Jelšah	Unknown	Slovene civilians
Pond Mass Grave	Grobišče za ribnikom	Maribor	Maribor	Unknown	Unknown
Popov Breg Grave	Grob Popov breg	Dobrovnik	Dobrovnik	1	German soldier
Praput Grave	Grobišče Praput	Brce	Ilirska Bistrica	1	German soldier
Predpod Grave	Grobišče Predpod	Brce	Ilirska Bistrica	1	German soldier
Preserje Cave Mass Grave	Grobišče Preserska jama	Sveto	Komen	Unknown	Unknown
Preval Cave 2 Mass Grave	Grobišče Jama na Prevali 2	Naklo	Divača	Unknown	Slovene civilians
Primary School Grave	Grobišče pri osnovni šoli	Dolnji Zemon	Ilirska Bistrica	1	German soldier
Primary School Mass Grave	Grobišče pri osnovni šoli	Bistrica ob Sotli	Bistrica ob Sotli	Unknown	Croatian soldiers and civilians
Princova Baronovka Mass Grave	Grobišče Princova baronovka	Vipava	Vipava	Unknown	German soldiers
Prosenjakovci Grave	Grobišče Prosenjakovci	Prosenjakovci	Moravske Toplice	1	Hungarian
Pušnik Chapel-Shrine Grave	Grobišče pri Pušnikovi kapeli	Zgornja Kapla	Podvelka	1	Slovene soldier
Railroad 1–4 mass graves	Grobišče ob železniški progi 1–4	Mislinja	Mislinja	Unknown	Unknown
Railroad Bridge Grave	Grob pri železniškem mostu	Mereče	Ilirska Bistrica	1	German soldier
Raščenek Beeches Mass Grave	Raščenkova bukva	Slivniško Pohorje	Hoče-Slivnica	Unknown	Civilians and soldiers
Ravence Mass Grave	Grobišče Ravence	Smrje	Ilirska Bistrica	3	German soldiers
Ravenska Vas 1–3 mass graves	Grobišče Ravenska vas 1–3	Ravenska Vas	Zagorje ob Savi	Unknown	Unknown
Ravne Mass Grave	Grobišče Ravne	Pance	Ljubljana	Unknown	Slovene civilians
Ravni 1 Mass Grave	Grobišče v Ravneh 1	Gornji Grad	Gornji Grad	100–200	Unknown
Ravni 2 Mass Grave	Grobišče v Ravneh 2	Dol	Gornji Grad	100–200	Unknown
Rebri Mass Grave	Grobišče Rebri	Ribnica	Pivka	Unknown	German soldiers
Rebrice Mass Grave	Grobišče Rebrice	Zabiče	Ilirska Bistrica	20	German soldiers
Rehar Corner Mass Grave	Grobišče Reharjev kot	Rogatec	Rogatec	4	Unknown
Reka No. 20 Mass Grave	Grobišče pri domačiji Reka 20	Reka	Laško	14	Croatian civilians
Repičnik Shaft Mass Grave	Grobišče Brezno Repičnik	Sekirišče	Velike Lašče	Unknown	Unknown
Repiše Shaft Mass Grave	Grobišče Brezno na Repišah	Kalce	Logatec	2	Unknown
Retje Mass Grave	Grobišče Retje	Retje nad Trbovljami	Trbovlje	Unknown	Unknown
Riverbank Mass Grave	Grobišče Breg	Trpčane	Ilirska Bistrica	4 or 20	German soldiers
Rob Grave	Grobišče Rob	Jelšane	Ilirska Bistrica	1	German soldier
Rob Shaft Mass Grave	Grobišče Brezno za Robom	Predmeja	Ajdovščina	Unknown	German soldiers, civilians
Rog Road Mass Grave	Grobišče ob Roški cesti	Podstenice	Dolenjske Toplice	Unknown	Civilians, soldiers
Rog Sawmill Mass Grave	Grobišče pri Žagi Rog	Trnovec	Kočevje	Unknown	Unknown
Roje Cave 1 Mass Grave	Grobišče Rojska jama 1	Trebanjski Vrh	Trebnje	10	Slovene civilians
Romani Mass Grave	Grobišče Romov	Bukovec	Velike Lašče	Unknown	Romani
Romani Mass Grave	Grobišče Romov	Iška	Ig	43	Romani
Rožič Vrh Mass Grave	Grobišče Rožič Vrh	Rožič Vrh	Črnomelj	Unknown	Unknown
Rugar Slopes Cave Mass Grave	Grobišče Jama v Rugarskih klancih	Podstenice	Dolenjske Toplice	Unknown	Slovene civilians and soldiers
Rupe Mass Grave	Grobišče v Rupah	Žažar	Horjul	9	Slovene civilians
Rušar Meadow Mass Grave	Grobišče Rušarjev travnik	Kranjska Gora	Kranjska Gora	35	German soldiers
Ruše Lodge at Areh 1 Mass Grave	Grobišče pri Ruški koči na Arehu 1	Frajhajm	Slovenska Bistrica	Unknown	Civilians and soldiers
Ruše Lodge at Areh 2 Mass Grave	Grobišče pri Ruški koči na Arehu 2	Lobnica	Ruše	Unknown	Civilians and soldiers
Ruše Lodge at Areh 3 Mass Grave	Grobišče pri Ruški koči na Arehu 3	Lobnica	Ruše	190	Civilians and soldiers
Ruše Lodge at Areh 4–16 mass graves	Grobišče pri Ruški koči na Arehu 4–16	Lobnica	Ruše	Unknown	Civilians and soldiers
Saint Barbara Abandoned Mine Shaft Mass Grave	Grobišče v opuščenem rudniškem jašku Sv. Barbara	Huda Jama	Laško	>3,000	Slovene soldiers and civilians, Croatian soldiers
Saint Bartholomew Mass Grave	Grobišče pri sv. Jerneju	Rogatec	Rogatec	3	Unknown
Saint Catherine Mass Grave	Grobišče Sv. Katarina	Novokračine	Ilirska Bistrica	Unknown	German soldiers
Saint Hyacintha Mass Grave	Grobišče pri sv. Hiacinti	Rogatec	Rogatec	12	Soldiers (nationality uncertain)
Sava Bridge Mass Grave	Grobišče pri mostu čez Savo	Podkraj	Hrastnik	Unknown	German soldiers
Savinja Mass Grave	Grobišče ob Savinji	Tremerje	Celje	6	Civilians
Savsko Naselje Mass Grave	Grobišče v Savskem naselju	Kranjska Gora	Kranjska Gora	35	German soldiers
Šef Woods Mass Grave	Grobišče Šefov gozd	Medlog	Celje	400	Croatian civilians
Sela Grave	Grobišče Sela	Brezovica	Šmarješke Toplice	2	Civilian, Slovene soldier
Selce 1 Mass Grave	Grobišče Selce 1	Celje	Celje	50–100	Civilians
Selce 2 Mass Grave	Grobišče Selce 2	Celje	Celje	Unknown	Civilians
Selce Electrical Substation Mass Grave	Grobišče Trafo postaja Selce	Celje	Celje	50–100	Civilians
Selo pri Žirovnici Mass Grave	Grobišče Selo pri Žirovnici	Selo pri Žirovnici	Žirovnica	6	Croatian soldiers
Šemon Shaft Mass Grave	Grobišče Šemonovo brezno	Logatec	Logatec	Unknown	Civilians
Senica Ravine Mass Grave	Grobišče Senicatov graben	Hrastnik	Hrastnik	Unknown	Unknown
Šentvid 1 Mass Grave	Grobišče Šentvid 1	Ljubljana	Ljubljana	Unknown	Slovene soldiers
Šentvid 2 Mass Grave	Grobišče Šentvid 2	Ljubljana	Ljubljana	Unknown	German soldiers
Šerbec Woods Mass Grave	Grobišče v Šerbečevem gozdu	Veliki Kamen	Krško	20	Croatian soldiers
Serbian Officer's Grave	Grob srbskega častnika	Setnica	Dobrova–Polhov Gradec	1	Serbian soldier
Sever Shaft Grave	Grobišče Severjevo brezno	Sveta Trojica	Domžale	1	Civilian
Shaft 1 by the Muha Enclosure Mass Grave	Grobišče Brezno 1 pri Muhovi ogradi	Trnje	Pivka	37	German soldiers
Shaft 217/218 Mass Grave	Grobišče Brezno 217/218	Ravni Dol	Sodražica	Unknown	Slovene civilians
Šimen Slide Mass Grave	Grobišče Šimnov plaz	Kamniška Bistrica	Kamnik	Unknown	Croatians
Sinkhole Cave Mass Grave	Grobišče Jama za vrtcem	Spodnja Lipnica	Radovljica	7	Slovene civilians
Ski Valley Mass Grave	Grobišče Smučarska dolina	Vincarje	Škofja Loka	20	German soldiers
Škitek 1 Mass Grave	Grobišče Škitek 1	Šentjanž pri Dravogradu	Dravograd	Unknown	Croatian soldiers
Škitek 2 Mass Grave	Grobišče Škitek 2	Šentjanž pri Dravogradu	Dravograd	62	Croatian soldiers
Škrajnek Shaft Mass Grave	Grobišče Brezno pri Škrajneku	Škrajnek	Ribnica	Unknown	Unknown
Slivniško Pohorje Mass Grave	Grobišče Slivniško Pohorje	Slivniško Pohorje	Hoče-Slivnica	Unknown	Civilians and soldiers
Slope Cave Mass Grave	Grobišče Jama pod klancem	Koritnice	Ilirska Bistrica	Unknown	German soldiers
Slope Mass Grave	Grobišče v Rebrah	Zakriž	Cerkno	22–23	Slovene civilians
Slovenijales Mass Grave	Grobišče Slovenijales	Medlog	Celje	Unknown	Croatian civilians
Šmarčna Čeček Field Mass Grave	Grobišče Šmarčna na čečkovi njivi	Šmarčna	Sevnica	8	Croatian soldiers
Smovc Mass Grave	Grobišče Smovc	Žeje pri Komendi	Komenda	10–15	Unknown
Snake Cave Mass Grave	Grobišče Kačna jama	Divača	Divača	25	German soldiers
Snežet Mass Grave	Grobišče Snežet	Ravenska Vas	Zagorje ob Savi	Unknown	Unknown
Snowdrop Valley Mass Grave	Grobišče Dolina zvončkov	Pongrac	Žalec	80–100	Slovene soldiers
Socerb Cave behind Vrh Mass Grave	Grobišče Socerbska jama za Vrhom	Socerb	Koper	Unknown	Unknown
Solne Mass Grave	Grobišče Solne	Jablanica	Ilirska Bistrica	4	German soldiers
Sovinec Ravine Mass Grave	Sovinčev graben	Rogaška Slatina	Rogaška Slatina	18–20	Croatians
Špan Gravel Pit Mass Grave	Grobišče Španov peskokop	Spodnje Gorje	Gorje	20	German nurses
Špirnica Mass Grave	Grobišče Špirnica	Črnotiče	Koper	> 9	Unknown
Spodnje Radvanje Mass Grave	Grobišče Spodnje Radvanje	Maribor	Maribor	Unknown	Unknown
Spodnji Krampl Grave	Grobišče Spodnji Krampl	Spodnja Kapla	Podvelka	1	Austrian civilian
Spring Creek Grave	Grobišče Studenčin potok	Harije	Ilirska Bistrica	1	German soldier
Špurn Chapel-Shrine Mass Grave	Grobišče Špurnova kapela	Rogatec	Rogatec	Unknown	1 Austrian soldier (rest unknown)
Središče Mass Grave	Grobišče Središče	Središče	Moravske Toplice	3	Hungarians
Sršen Grave	Grobišče Sršenovo	Spodnja Kapla	Podvelka	1	Austrian civilian
Sršen 3 Grave	Grobišče Sršen 3	Zgornja Kapla	Podvelka	1	Civilian
Sršen Shack Grave	Grobišče Sršenova koča	Spodnja Kapla	Podvelka	1	Austrian civilian
Stajnica Mass Grave	Grobišče Stajnica	Dolnji Zemon	Ilirska Bistrica	4	German soldiers
Stari Grad Mass Grave	Grobišče Stari Grad	Stari Grad	Krško	Unknown	Croatians
Stehan 1 and 2 mass graves	Grobišče Stehan 1, 2	Spodnje Blato	Grosuplje	Unknown	Slovene soldiers and civilians
Steps Mass Grave	Grobišče pri štengah	Crngrob	Škofja Loka	200–300	Croatian and Slovene soldiers and civilians
Sterntal 1 and 2 mass graves	Grobišče Sterntal 1, 2	Kidričevo	Kidričevo	< 5,000	German, Gottschee German, and Hungarian civilians
Štihthaber Grave	Grob pri Štihthaberjevih	Dobrovnik	Dobrovnik	1	German soldier
Stojnica Mass Grave	Grobišče Stojnica	Dolnji Zemon	Ilirska Bistrica	4	German soldiers
Stomaž 1 Mass Grave	Grobišče Stomaž 1	Stomaž	Ajdovščina	Unknown	Civilians
Stomaž 2 Mass Grave	Grobišče Stomaž 2	Stomaž	Ajdovščina	11	Civilians
Stomaž 3 Mass Grave	Grobišče Stomaž 3	Stomaž	Ajdovščina	1	Civilian
Stomaž 4 Mass Grave	Grobišče Stomaž 4	Stomaž	Ajdovščina	2	Civilians
Stranje Mass Grave	Grobišče Stranje	Stranje	Krško	4–5	Civilians
Stražica Mass Grave	Grobišče pod Stražico	Ilirska Bistrica	Ilirska Bistrica	Unknown	German soldiers
Strmica Mass Grave	Grobišče pod Strmico	Strmica	Vrhnika	12	Unknown
Strmol Mass Grave	Grobišče za Strmolom	Rogatec	Rogatec	Unknown	Soldiers
Strmol Park 1 and 2 graves	Grobišče v parku Strmol 1, 2	Rogatec	Rogatec	2	Yugoslav soldiers
Studenčino Grave	Grobišče Studenčino	Harije	Ilirska Bistrica	1	German soldier
Stvarnik Meadow Mass Grave	Grobišče na Stvarnikovi njivi	Šoštanj	Šoštanj	Unknown	Slovene, Croatian, and German civilians
Šulnovka Mass Grave	Grobišče Šulnovka	Bojanja Vas	Metlika	Unknown	Civilians
Šunčak Mass Grave	Grobišče Šunčak	Novokračine	Ilirska Bistrica	13	German soldiers
Sunny Park Mass Grave	Grobišče Sončni park	Celje	Celje	50–100	German soldiers
Sušica Creek Mass Grave	Grobišče ob potoku Sušica	Drensko Rebro	Kozje	Unknown	Croatian soldiers
Šušnjak Grave	Grobišče Šušnjak	Jelšane	Ilirska Bistrica	1	German soldier
Šušnjak Mass Grave	Grobišče Šušnjak	Novokračine	Ilirska Bistrica	13	German soldiers
Svešek Alder Mass Grave	Grobišče Sveščeva jelša	Komenda	Komenda	10–15	Unknown
Sveteč Woods Grave	Grobišče Svetečev gozd	Gmajna	Slovenj Gradec	1	Croatian soldier
Svetel Woods Grave	Grobišče povojnih žrtev v Svetelovem gozdu	Podgorje	Kamnik	Unknown	Croatian soldiers
Szent Janos Grave	Grob Szent Janos	Dobrovnik	Dobrovnik	1	German soldier
Teharje Mass Grave	Grobišče Teharje	Vrhe	Celje	Unknown	Germans and Slovenes
Tenth Cross Grave	Grob pri desetem križu	Novokračine	Ilirska Bistrica	1	German soldier
Teržan Farm Mass Grave	Grobišče pri domačiji Teržan	Gornji Dolič	Mislinja	Unknown	Croatian soldiers
Tezno Woods 1 Mass Grave	Grobišče Tezenski gozd 1	Maribor	Maribor	1,179	Croatian soldiers
Tezno Woods 2–6 mass graves	Grobišče Tezenski gozd 2–6	Dogoše	Maribor	15,000	Croatian soldiers, other
Tiček Cave Mass Grave	Grobišče Tičkova jama	Trnje	Pivka	Unknown	Unknown
Tičjek Mass Grave	Grobišče Tičjek	Gornji Grad	Gornji Grad	7–9	Civilians
Tierberg Mass Grave	Grobišče Tierberg	Dol pri Hrastniku	Hrastnik	Unknown	Serbian and Slovene soldiers, Slovene civilians
Tirdrož Mass Grave	Grobišče Tirdrož	Medlog	Celje	Unknown	Croatians
Tirgut Mass Grave	Grobišče Tirgut	Medlog	Celje	Unknown	Croatians
Tnal Mass Grave	Grobišče pod Tnalom	Mojstrana	Kranjska Gora	10–20	German soldiers
Topolc Mill Mass Grave	Grobišče pri topolškem mlinu	Topolc	Ilirska Bistrica	80	German soldiers
Town Park Mass Grave	Grobišče Mestni park	Trbovlje	Trbovlje	30	German soldiers
Train Station Mass Grave	Grobišče nad postajo	Velike Lašče	Velike Lašče	Unknown	Unknown
Travna Gora 1–4 mass graves	Grobišče Travna gora 1–4	Ravni Dol	Sodražica	48	Slovene soldiers
Trebnik Manor Mass Grave	Grobišče nad graščino Trebnik	Zgornja Pristava	Slovenske Konjice	30–40	Slovene civilians
Tretjak Farm Mass Grave	Grobišče na domačiji Tretjak	Gradišče	Slovenj Gradec	12	Croatians
Trlično Mass Grave	Grobišče Trlično	Trlično	Rogatec	> 20	Croatians, Banat Swabians
Troblje Mass Grave	Grobišče Troblje	Gradišče	Slovenj Gradec	Unknown	Croatians
Troha Woods Cave Mass Grave	Jama v Trohovem gozdu	Vrh	Loška Dolina	Unknown	Slovenes
Trontelj Shaft Mass Grave	Grobišče Trontljevo brezno	Cerovo	Grosuplje	Unknown	Unknown
Tudrež Mass Grave	Tudrež Mass Grave	Bovše	Vojnik	13	German civilians
Tuma Street Mass Grave	Grobišče ob Tumovi ulici	Celje	Celje	6	German soldiers, civilians
Ukanc Mass Grave	Pri Ukancu	Ukanc	Bohinj	Unknown	Croatians
Underhill Mass Grave	Grobišče Pod grmado	Pance	Ljubljana	Unknown	Slovene civilians
Upper Videm Mass Grave	Grobišče nad Vidmom	Knežja Lipa	Kočevje	Unknown	Unknown
Ustaša Ravine Mass Grave	Grobišče Ustašev graben	Dobovec	Trbovlje	Unknown	Unknown
Valley Enclosure Mass Grave	Grobišče Ograda v dolini	Brce	Ilirska Bistrica	9	German soldiers
Vastance Grave	Grobišče V Vastancah	Sveta Trojica	Domžale	1	Civilian
Velenik Mass Grave	Grobišče Velenik	Pokoše	Slovenska Bistrica	Unknown	Civilians
Velike Lipljene Mass Grave	Grobišče Velike Lipljene	Velike Lipljene	Grosuplje	Unknown	Unknown
Veliki Kamen Mass Grave	Grobišče Veliki Kamen	Mali Kamen	Krško	20–30	Croatian soldiers
Veržun Woods Mass Grave	Grobišče Veržunov gozd	Leše	Prevalje	100	Austrian and Slovene civilians
Vidos Oaks Mass Grave	Grobišče Vidosovi ceri	Harije	Ilirska Bistrica	4	German soldiers
Vilenica Mass Grave	Grobišče Vilenica	Podpeč	Koper	Unknown	Unknown
Vineyard Mass Grave	Grobišče Vinograd	Šembije	Ilirska Bistrica	30	German soldiers
Vipava Field Mass Grave	Grobišče Vipavsko polje	Vipava	Vipava	Unknown	German soldiers
Viper Cave Mass Grave	Grobišče Gadova jama	Zapotok	Ig	Unknown	Unknown
Viršk Field Mass Grave	Grobišče Virško polje	Škofja Loka	Škofja Loka	Unknown	German soldiers
Višnja Vas 1 Mass Grave	Grobišče Višnja vas 1	Vojnik	Vojnik	100	Croatian soldiers and civilians
Višnja Vas 2 Mass Grave	Grobišče Višnja vas 2	Vojnik	Vojnik	Unknown	Croatian civilians
Vodice 1–10 mass graves	Grobišče Vodice 1–10	Selo pri Pancah	Ljubljana	Unknown	Slovene civilians
Vodišek Shaft Mass Grave	Grobišče Vodiško brezno	Dobec	Cerknica	Unknown	Slovene civilians
Vojnik Mass Grave	Grobišče Vojnik	Vojnik	Vojnik	100–200	Croatian civilians and soldiers
Vrček Mass Grave	Grobišče Vrček	Zarečje	Ilirska Bistrica	16	German soldier
Vrtača Mass Grave	Grobišče Vrtača	Sevnica	Sevnica	Unknown	Unknown
Vrženca Mass Grave	Grobišče Vrženca	Podgorje	Koper	Unknown	Unknown
Wasp Shaft Mass Grave	Grobišče Osje brezno	Petrinje	Hrpelje-Kozina	Unknown	Unknown
Wild Apple Shaft Mass Grave	Grobišče Brezno za lesniko	Trnovo	Nova Gorica	Unknown	Slovene and Italian soldiers, Slovene civilians
Women's Mass Grave	Grobišče "ženski grob"	Košnica pri Celju	Celje	400–600	Slovene and German civilians
Wounded Mass Grave	Grobišče ranjencev	Iška	Ig	Unknown	Slovene soldiers
Yard Grave	Grobišče Vrt	Jablanica	Ilirska Bistrica	1	German soldier
Yard Grave	Grob na vrtu	Zabiče	Ilirska Bistrica	1	German soldier
Zabrinov Hill Mass Grave	Grobišče Zabrinovski hrib	Gornji Grad	Gornji Grad	56	Slovene soldiers
Zagradec Mass Grave	Grobišče Zagradec	Rožič Vrh	Črnomelj	61	Romani
Zahrib Mass Grave	Grobišče Zahrib	Dolnji Zemon	Ilirska Bistrica	30	German soldiers
Zakovšek Woods below Strmica Mass Grave	Grobišče v Zakovškem gozdu pod Strmco	Strmica	Vrhnika	12	Unknown
Zakriž Mass Grave	Grobišče Zakriž	Zakriž	Cerkno	22–23	Slovene civilians
Zakutka Mass Grave	Grobišče Zakutka	Dolnji Suhor pri Metliki	Metlika	4	Slovene civilians
Zalesnika Shaft Mass Grave	Grobišče Brezno Zalesnika	Trnovo	Nova Gorica	Unknown	Slovene and Italian soldiers, Slovene civilians
Žančani Mass Grave	Grobišče Žančani	Raduše	Slovenj Gradec	Unknown	Croatian soldiers
Zapotok Narrow Shaft Mass Grave	Grobišče Ozko brezno pri Zapotoku	Zapotok	Ig	Unknown	Unknown
Zarja 1 and 2 mass graves	Pod Zarjo 1, 2	Frajhajm	Slovenska Bistrica	Unknown	Civilians and soldiers
Zavetnik Farm Grave	Grobišče Zavetnikov grunt	Vrhpolje	Vipava	1	Slovene civilian
Zavrh Mass Grave	Grobišče Zavrh	Podbeže	Ilirska Bistrica	2	German soldiers
Zdih Woods Grave	Grobišče Zdihov gozd	Selovec	Dravograd	1	Croatian soldier
Zgornja Hudinja Mass Grave	Grobišče Zgornja Hudinja	Celje	Celje	37	Croatian soldiers and civilians
Zgornji Otok Mass Grave	Grobišče Zgornji Otok	Zgornji Otok	Radovljica	14	Croatian soldiers
Zgornji Pavlič Mass Grave	Grobišče Zgornji Pavlič	Zgornja Kapla	Podvelka	45	Hungarian civilians
Zgoša Mass Grave	Grobišče Zgoša	Mošnje	Radovljica	Unknown	German soldiers
Žiglovica Cave Mass Grave	Grobišče Jama Žiglovica	Ribnica	Ribnica	14	Slovene civilians
Žolšče Mass Grave	Grobišče Žolšče	Puštal	Škofja Loka	10	Slovene civilians
Žovšče Mass Grave	Grobišče Žovšče	Puštal	Škofja Loka	10	Slovene civilians
Zparte Grave	Grob Zparte	Mala Bukovica	Ilirska Bistrica	1	German soldier

== See also ==
- Cerklje ob Krki Airport
- Kočevski Rog massacre
- Mass graves in Celje
- Mass graves in Ljubljana
- Mass graves in Maribor
- St. Ulrich's Church in Dobrunje
- Tezno mass graves
