= Brce =

- Location in Slovenia
- Coordinates: 45°34′25.9″N 14°11′19.69″E
- Country: Slovenia
- Traditional region: Inner Carniola
- Statistical region: Littoral–Inner Carniola
- Municipality: Ilirska Bistrica

Area
  - Total: 1.53 km^{2} (0.59 sq mi)
- Elevation: 493.7 m (1,620 ft)

Population (2002)
  - Total: 35

Brce (pronounced [ˈbəɾstsɛ]; German: Berdze, Italian: Berze) is a small settlement in the hills west of Ilirska Bistrica in the Inner Carniola region of Slovenia.

== Name ==
The name Brce (now a feminine plural through dialect development) is derived from Brdca (< *Bьrdьca), which was a plural form of the neuter diminutive common noun *bьrdьce (< *bьrdo) 'little hill'. The name thus refers to a local geographical feature.

== History ==
During the Second World War, Partisan units based in the Brkini Hills maintained a cache of arms and medical supplies in the village. The Partisan committee for the Ilirska Bistrica zone was temporarily headquartered in bunkers in the village. On 4 May 1945, German forces surprised a Partisan unit in the village and killed 45 of its members.

=== Mass graves ===
Brce is the site of four known mass graves or clandestine graves from the end of the Second World War. They all contain the remains of German soldiers from the 97th Corps that fell at the beginning of May 1945. The Church Mass Grave (Slovene: Grobišče ob cerkvi) is located on the north side of the village church by two piles of stones and bricks. It contains the remains of eight soldiers. The Valley Enclosure Mass Grave (Grobišče Ograda v dolini) lies about 850 m northeast of Brce and contains the remains of nine soldiers. The Enclosure Grave (Grob Ograda) lies in the bushes about 650 m northeast of Brce and contains the remains of one soldier. The Praput Grave (Grobišče Praput), also known as the Predpod Grave (Grobišče Predpod), is located between an aspen and a pear tree on the edge of an orchard about 400 m northwest of Brce. It contains the remains of one soldier.

== Church ==
The local church in the settlement is dedicated to the Holy Spirit and belongs to the Parish of Ilirska Bistrica. The church was built in the mid-17th century. It has a rectangular chancel, a somewhat wider rectangular nave, and a bell tower. It has a tiled roof and modest furnishings from the 18th century.

== Cultural heritage ==
In addition to the church, two other sites in Brce are registered as cultural heritage:

- The farm at Brce no. 11. is abandoned. It features a two-story grain mill and sawmill. The doors and windows of the structures have dressed stone frames. The barn originally had a thatched roof. The house has a clay tile roof and contained a fireplace.
- The clustered village itself is also registered as cultural heritage. It primarily consists of two-story straight-line structures built of sandstone.
