= Zalči =

- Location in Slovenia
- Coordinates: 45°32′47″N 14°10′56″E
- Country: Slovenia
- Traditional region: Inner Carniola
- Statistical region: Littoral–Inner Carniola
- Municipality: Ilirska Bistrica

Area
  - Total: 0.20 km^{2} (0.077 sq mi)
- Elevation: 443 m (1,453 ft)

Population (2014)
  - Total: 20

Zalči (pronounced [ˈzaːltʃi]) is a small settlement along the road from Ilirska Bistrica to Podgrad in the Inner Carniola region of Slovenia.

== History ==
Zalči became an independent settlement in 2006, when territory was split off from the settlements of Podbeže, Tominje, Harije, and Sabonje to constitute it.
