= Dobro Polje, Ilirska Bistrica =

Dobro Polje
- Village
- Location in Slovenia
- Coordinates: 45°33′45.09″N 14°12′54.36″E
- Country: Slovenia
- Traditional region: Inner Carniola
- Statistical region: Littoral–Inner Carniola
- Municipality: Ilirska Bistrica

Area
  - Total: 1.37 km^{2} (0.53 sq mi)
- Elevation: 458.9 m (1,506 ft)

Population (2002)
  - Total: 71

Dobro Polje (pronounced [ˈdɔːbɾo ˈpoːljɛ]; locally also Dobropolje, Italian: Poglie di Torrenova) is a small settlement west of Ilirska Bistrica in the Inner Carniola region of Slovenia.

== Geography ==
Dobro Polje is a ribbon village consisting of two rows of houses standing along a side road parallel to the main road from Rečica to Harije. It lies on a gentle slope in the Brkini Hills. There are tilled fields and meadows on the slopes and ridges above the village.

== Name ==
The name Dobro Polje literally means 'good field', referring to the local geography, and is of the same origin as Dobro Polje in Serbia, the Slovene regional name Dobrepolje, and Dropolje (German: Tröpolach) in Austria. Locally, the name is pronounced Drapu̯oľe.

== Mass grave ==
Dobro Polje is the site of a mass grave from the end of the Second World War. The Church Mass Grave (Slovene: Grobišče ob cerkvi) is located on the north side of the church and contains the remains of two German soldiers from the 97th Corps that fell at the beginning of May 1945.

== Church ==
The small church in the settlement is dedicated to Saint Florian and belongs to the Parish of Ilirska Bistrica.
