= Podstenjšek =

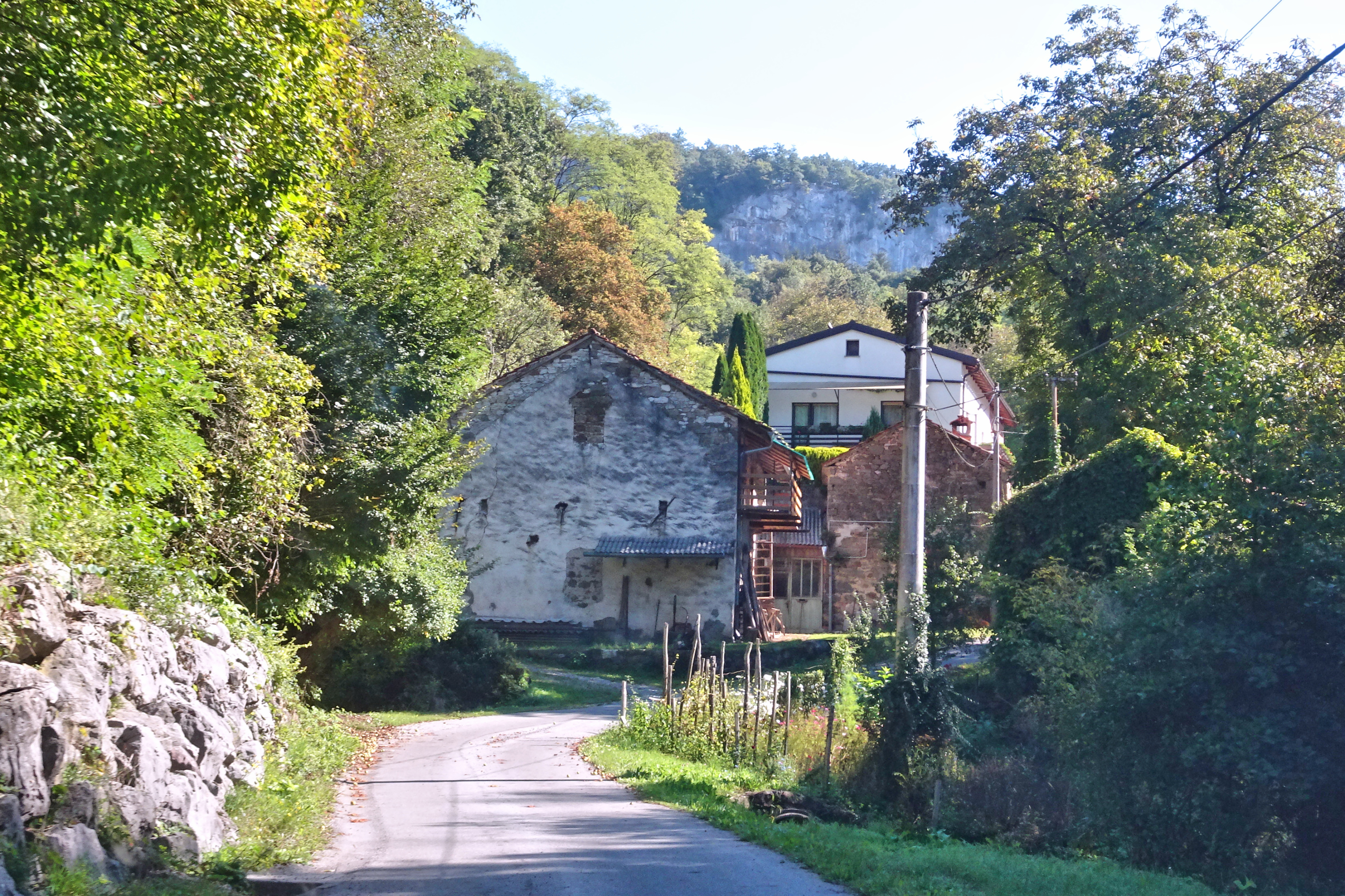

- Location in Slovenia
- Coordinates: 45°36′7.65″N 14°12′57.45″E
- Country: Slovenia
- Traditional region: Inner Carniola
- Statistical region: Littoral–Inner Carniola
- Municipality: Ilirska Bistrica

Area
  - Total: 0.57 km^{2} (0.22 sq mi)
- Elevation: 422.3 m (1,385 ft)

Population (2002)
  - Total: 4

Podstenjšek (pronounced [pɔtˈsteːnʃək]) is a small settlement next to Podstenje in the Municipality of Ilirska Bistrica in the Inner Carniola region of Slovenia.
