= Janeževo Brdo =

- Location in Slovenia
- Coordinates: 45°36′34.86″N 14°9′10.45″E
- Country: Slovenia
- Traditional region: Inner Carniola
- Statistical region: Littoral–Inner Carniola
- Municipality: Ilirska Bistrica

Area
  - Total: 2.48 km^{2} (0.96 sq mi)
- Elevation: 585.6 m (1,921 ft)

Population (2002)
  - Total: 23

Janeževo Brdo (pronounced [ˈjaːnɛʒɛʋɔ ˈbəɾdɔ]; German: Janeschewo Berdo, Italian: Berdo San Giovanni) is a small village in the hills east of Prem in the Municipality of Ilirska Bistrica in the Inner Carniola region of Slovenia.

The local church in the settlement is dedicated to Saint Francis of Assisi and belongs to the Parish of Prem.
