= Podtabor =

Podtabor may refer to:

- Podtabor, Dobrepolje
- Podtabor, Ilirska Bistrica
- Šent Jurij, formerly known as Podtabor pri Grosupljem
