= Trpčane =

- Location in Slovenia
- Coordinates: 45°31′34.05″N 14°19′14.09″E
- Country: Slovenia
- Traditional region: Inner Carniola
- Statistical region: Littoral–Inner Carniola
- Municipality: Ilirska Bistrica

Area
  - Total: 4.5 km^{2} (1.7 sq mi)
- Elevation: 429.9 m (1,410 ft)

Population (2002)
  - Total: 122

Trpčane (pronounced [təɾpˈtʃaːnɛ]; German: Terptschane, Italian: Terciane) is a village southeast of Ilirska Bistrica in the Inner Carniola region of Slovenia.

== Mass graves ==
Trpčane is the site of a mass grave and a clandestine grave from the end of the Second World War. They both contain the remains of German soldiers from the 97th Corps that were killed at the beginning of May 1945. The Riverbank Mass Grave (Slovene: Grobišče Breg), also known as the Frkovec Mass Grave (Grobišče Frkovec), lies on the bank of the Reka River east of the settlement, about 300 meters (980 ft) north of a bridge. It contains the remains of either four or 20 soldiers. The Linden Grave (Grob pri lipi) lies 20 meters (66 ft) from the house at Trpčane no. 22 and contains the remains of one soldier.

== Church ==
The small church in the settlement is dedicated to Saint Anthony of Padua and belongs to the Parish of Podgraje.
