= Kilovče =

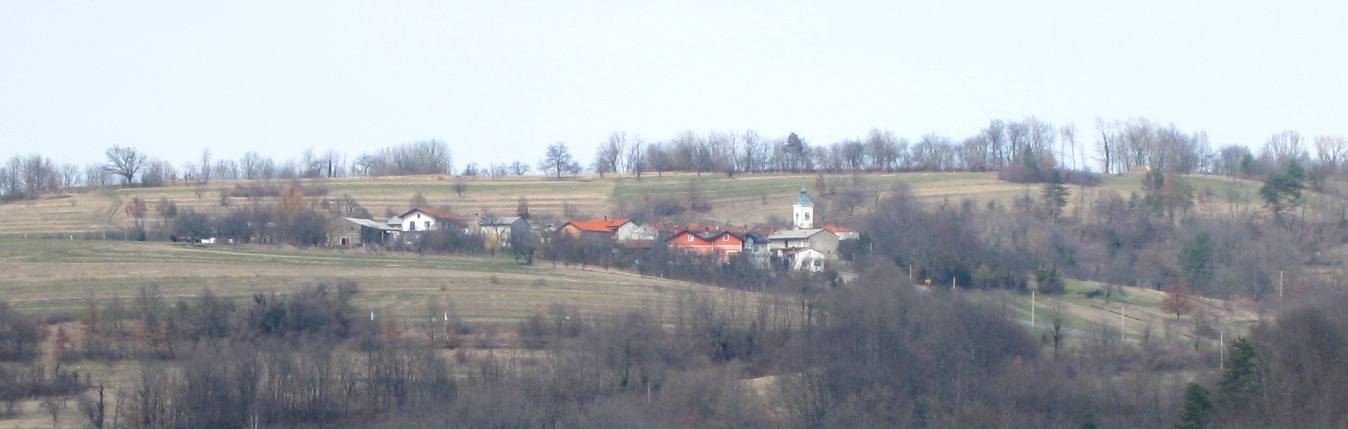
- Kilovče in 2009

- Location in Slovenia
- Coordinates: 45°37′12.02″N 14°11′11.77″E
- Country: Slovenia
- Traditional region: Inner Carniola
- Statistical region: Littoral–Inner Carniola
- Municipality: Ilirska Bistrica

Area
  - Total: 1.58 km^{2} (0.61 sq mi)
- Elevation: 538.9 m (1,768 ft)

Population (2002)
  - Total: 55

Kilovče (pronounced [ˈkiːlɔu̯tʃɛ]; German: Killenberg, in older sources Küllenberg, Italian: Monte Chilovi) is a small village north of Prem in the Municipality of Ilirska Bistrica in the Inner Carniola region of Slovenia.

== Church ==
The local church in the settlement is dedicated to Mary Magdalene and belongs to the Parish of Prem.

== Notable people ==
Notable people that were born or lived in Kilovče include:

- Matija Kastelec (1620–1688), Roman Catholic priest and lexicographer
