= Pavlica =

Pavlica may refer to:

- Pavlica, Slovenia, a village in Slovenia
- Pavlica (Raška), a village in Serbia
- 16274 Pavlica, an asteroid
