= Huje, Ilirska Bistrica =

Huje
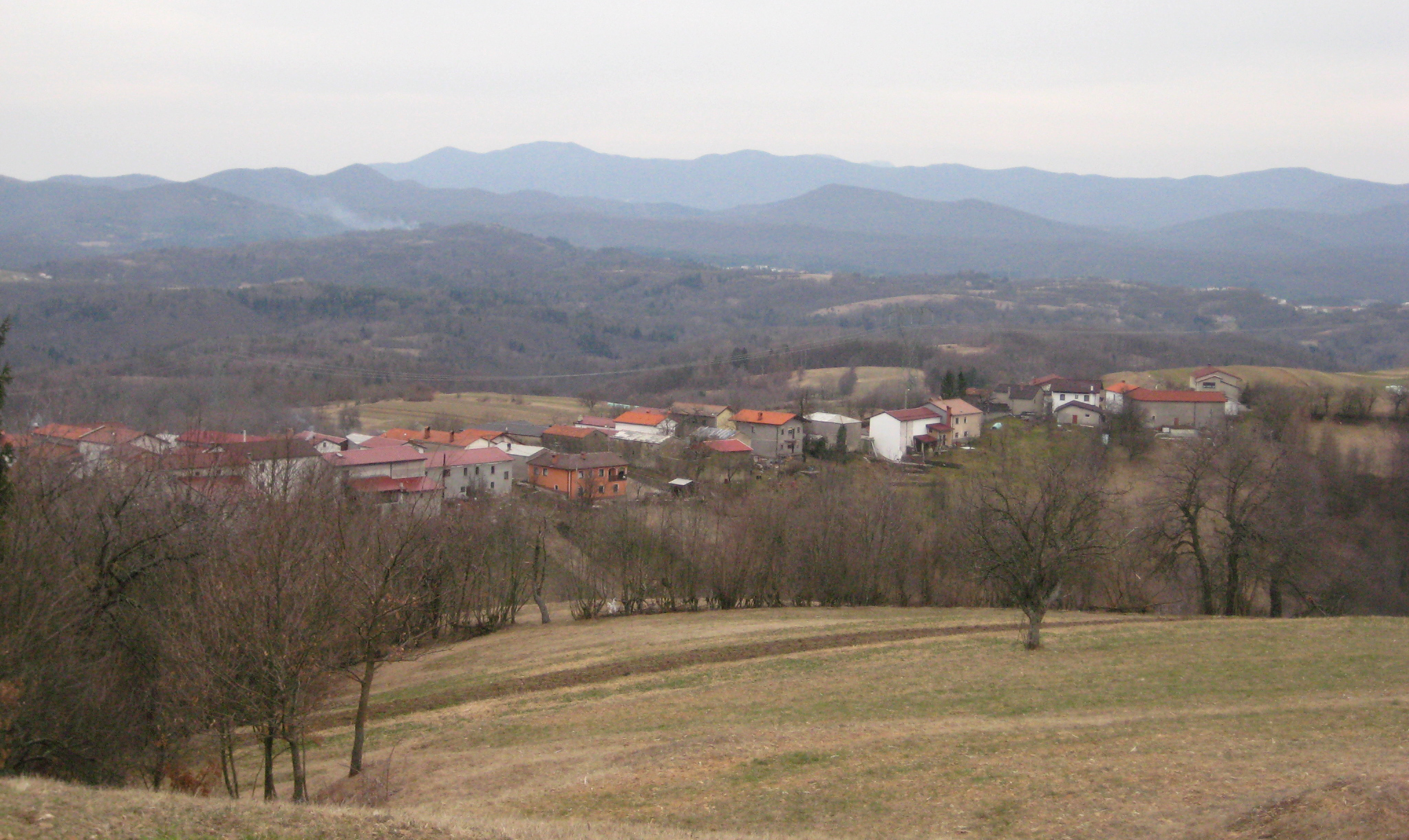

- Location in Slovenia
- Coordinates: 45°34′41.98″N 14°7′24.2″E
- Country: Slovenia
- Traditional region: Inner Carniola
- Statistical region: Littoral–Inner Carniola
- Municipality: Ilirska Bistrica

Area
  - Total: 2.77 km^{2} (1.07 sq mi)
- Elevation: 718.5 m (2,357 ft)

Population (2002)
  - Total: 111

Huje (pronounced [ˈxuːjɛ]; Italian: Cuie) is a small settlement in the hills west of Ilirska Bistrica in the Inner Carniola region of Slovenia.

The small church in the settlement is dedicated to the Holy Family and belongs to the Parish of Pregarje.
