= Zabiče =

- Location in Slovenia
- Coordinates: 45°30′56.8″N 14°20′42.32″E
- Country: Slovenia
- Traditional region: Inner Carniola
- Statistical region: Littoral–Inner Carniola
- Municipality: Ilirska Bistrica

Area
  - Total: 18.07 km^{2} (6.98 sq mi)
- Elevation: 443.6 m (1,455 ft)

Population (2002)
  - Total: 315

Zabiče (pronounced [zaˈbiːtʃɛ]; Italian: Zabice Castelvecchio) is a village in the Municipality of Ilirska Bistrica in the Inner Carniola region of Slovenia, close to the border with Croatia.

== Mass graves ==
Zabiče is the site of two known mass graves and a clandestine grave from the end of the Second World War. They all contain the remains of German soldiers from the 97th Corps that were killed at the beginning of May 1945. The Rebrice Mass Grave (Slovene: Grobišče Rebrice) lies about 320 meters (1,050 ft) southwest of the bridge across the Reka River and contains the remains of about 20 prisoners of war. The Jernak Pond Mass Grave (Grobišče Mlaka pri Jernakovih) lies about 450 meters (1,480 ft) northwest of the bridge and contains the remains three prisoners of war. The Yard Grave (Grob na vrtu) lies in a yard near the house at Zabiče no. 15 and contains the remains of one soldier.

== Church ==
The local church in the settlement is dedicated to John the Baptist and belongs to the Parish of Podgraje.
