= Prelože, Ilirska Bistrica =

Prelože
- Location in Slovenia
- Coordinates: 45°36′8.71″N 14°7′55.62″E
- Country: Slovenia
- Traditional region: Inner Carniola
- Statistical region: Littoral–Inner Carniola
- Municipality: Ilirska Bistrica

Area
  - Total: 3.82 km^{2} (1.47 sq mi)
- Elevation: 679.1 m (2,228 ft)

Population (2002)
  - Total: 72

Prelože (pronounced [pɾɛˈloːʒɛ]; Italian: Prelose Sant'Egidio) is a village in the hills northwest of Ilirska Bistrica in the Inner Carniola region of Slovenia.

The local church in the settlement is dedicated to Saint Giles and belongs to the Parish of Pregarje.
