= Snežnik (settlement) =

- Location in Slovenia
- Coordinates: 45°35′20.96″N 14°26′48.46″E
- Country: Slovenia
- Traditional region: Inner Carniola
- Statistical region: Littoral–Inner Carniola
- Municipality: Ilirska Bistrica

Area
  - Total: 95.03 km^{2} (36.69 sq mi)
- Elevation: 1,242–1,745 m (4,075–5,725 ft)

Population (2002)
  - Total: 8

Snežnik (pronounced [snɛˈʒniːk], German: Schneeberg) is a dispersed settlement on the slopes of Mount Snežnik in the Municipality of Ilirska Bistrica in the Inner Carniola region of Slovenia.

== Geography ==
Snežnik includes the hamlets of Mašun to the north, Sviščaki to the west, and Gomanjče (German: Hermsburg, Italian: Casa di caccia) to the south on the border with Croatia.

== History ==
Snežnik became an independent settlement in 1989, when territory was split off from the settlements of Ilirska Bistrica and Koritnice to constitute it.
