= Male Loče =

Place in Inner Carniola, Slovenia

- Location in Slovenia
- Coordinates: 45°32′46.54″N 14°6′27.44″E
- Country: Slovenia
- Traditional region: Inner Carniola
- Statistical region: Littoral–Inner Carniola
- Municipality: Ilirska Bistrica

Area
  - Total: 2.29 km^{2} (0.88 sq mi)
- Elevation: 498.1 m (1,634 ft)

Population (2016)
  - Total: 29

Male Loče (pronounced [ˈmaːlɛ ˈloːtʃɛ]; Italian: Loce Piccola) is a small village northwest of Podgrad in the Municipality of Ilirska Bistrica in the Inner Carniola region of Slovenia.

The local church in the settlement is dedicated to Saint Michael and belongs to the Parish of Hrušica.
