= Šembije =

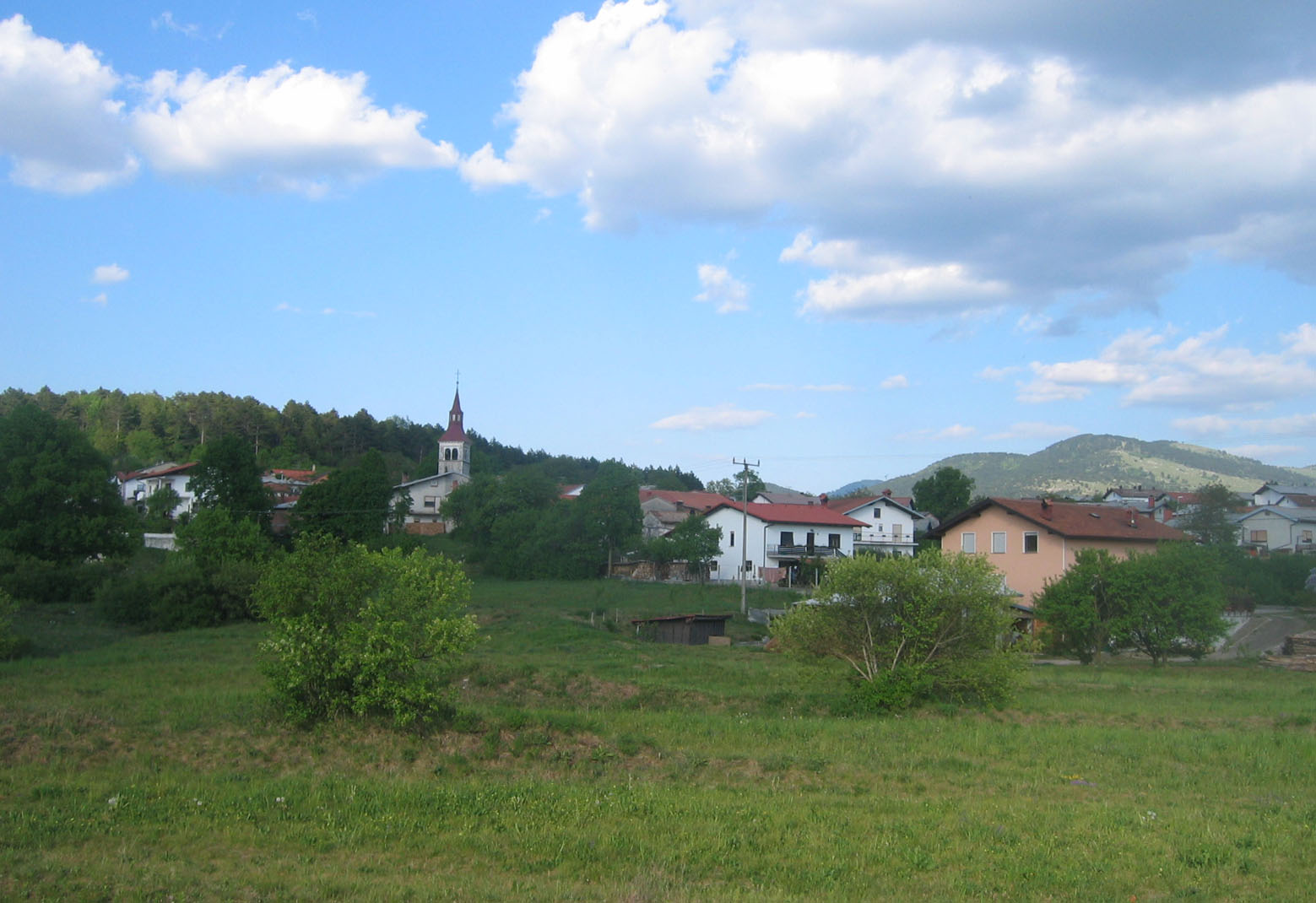

- Location in Slovenia
- Coordinates: 45°36′11.4″N 14°14′14.01″E
- Country: Slovenia
- Traditional region: Inner Carniola
- Statistical region: Littoral–Inner Carniola
- Municipality: Ilirska Bistrica

Area
  - Total: 10.85 km^{2} (4.19 sq mi)
- Elevation: 592.5 m (1,944 ft)

Population (2002)
  - Total: 209

Šembije (pronounced [ʃɛmˈbiːjɛ]; German: Schembije, Italian: Sembie) is a village north of Ilirska Bistrica in the Inner Carniola region of Slovenia.

== Mass graves ==
Šembije is the site of two known mass graves from the period immediately after the Second World War. They are both located south of the village and contain the remains of German soldiers from the 97th Corps that fell at the beginning of May 1945. The Golak Mass Grave (Slovene: Grobišče Golak) lies next to the road and contains the remains of 12 soldiers. The Vineyard Mass Grave (Grobišče Vinograd) lies east of the road and contains the remains of 30 soldiers.

== Church ==
The local church in the settlement is dedicated to Saint Vitus and belongs to the Parish of Knežak.
