= Zarečje =

- Location in Slovenia
- Coordinates: 45°34′25.77″N 14°12′33.96″E
- Country: Slovenia
- Traditional region: Inner Carniola
- Statistical region: Littoral–Inner Carniola
- Municipality: Ilirska Bistrica

Area
  - Total: 2.91 km^{2} (1.12 sq mi)
- Elevation: 434.8 m (1,427 ft)

Population (2002)
  - Total: 171

Zarečje (pronounced [zaˈɾeːtʃjɛ]; German: Saretschje, Italian: Sarezzo) is a village west of Ilirska Bistrica in the Inner Carniola region of Slovenia.

== Mass graves ==
Zarečje is the site of three known mass graves or clandestine graves from the end of the Second World War. They all contain the remains of German soldiers from the 97th Corps that fell at the beginning of May 1945. The Vrček Mass Grave (Slovene: Grobišče Vrček) is located about 320 meters (1,050 ft) west of the village center, on the overgrown edge of a meadow. It contains the remains of 16 soldiers. The Commons Grave (Grob Gmajna) lies along a dirt road to Harije in the woods about 900 meters (3,000 ft) south of the church and contains the remains of one soldier. The Klečet Grave (Grobišče Klečet) is located in the Klečet meadow about 250 meters (820 ft) east of the house at Zarečje no. 5a. It contains the remains of one soldier.

== Church ==
The local church in the settlement is dedicated to Saint Sebastian and belongs to the Parish of Ilirska Bistrica.
