= Soze =

- Location in Slovenia
- Coordinates: 45°32′17.68″N 14°12′15.01″E
- Country: Slovenia
- Traditional region: Inner Carniola
- Statistical region: Littoral–Inner Carniola
- Municipality: Ilirska Bistrica

Area
  - Total: 1.06 km^{2} (0.41 sq mi)
- Elevation: 498.9 m (1,637 ft)

Population (2002)
  - Total: 39

Soze (pronounced [ˈsoːzɛ]; Italian: Sose) is a small village on a hill above Lake Mola southwest of Ilirska Bistrica in the Inner Carniola region of Slovenia.

The local church in the settlement is dedicated to Mary Help of Christians and belongs to the Parish of Harije.
