= Čelje =

- Location in Slovenia
- Coordinates: 45°34′48.67″N 14°10′02.79″E
- Country: Slovenia
- Traditional region: Inner Carniola
- Statistical region: Littoral–Inner Carniola
- Municipality: Ilirska Bistrica

Area
  - Total: 5.48 km^{2} (2.12 sq mi)
- Elevation: 593.7 m (1,948 ft)

Population (2002)
  - Total: 64

Čelje (pronounced [ˈtʃeːljɛ]; German: Tschelje; Italian: Ceglie [ˈtʃɛʎʎe]) is a small village in the hills southwest of Prem, in the Municipality of Ilirska Bistrica, in the Inner Carniola region of Slovenia.

The local church in the settlement is dedicated to Saint Jerome and belongs to the Parish of Prem.
