= Zajelšje =

- Location in Slovenia
- Coordinates: 45°33′48.82″N 14°9′30.01″E
- Country: Slovenia
- Traditional region: Inner Carniola
- Statistical region: Littoral–Inner Carniola
- Municipality: Ilirska Bistrica

Area
  - Total: 2.23 km^{2} (0.86 sq mi)
- Elevation: 541.2 m (1,776 ft)

Population (2002)
  - Total: 52

Zajelšje (pronounced [zaˈjeːu̯ʃjɛ]; Italian: Zaielse) is a village in the hills west of Ilirska Bistrica in the Inner Carniola region of Slovenia.

The local church in the settlement is dedicated to Saint Barbara and belongs to the Parish of Pregarje.
