= Sušak =

Sušak may refer to several places:

- Sušak, Rijeka, Croatia
- Sušak, Slovenia, a village in the Municipality of Ilirska Bistrica in Slovenia
