= Rjavče =

- Village
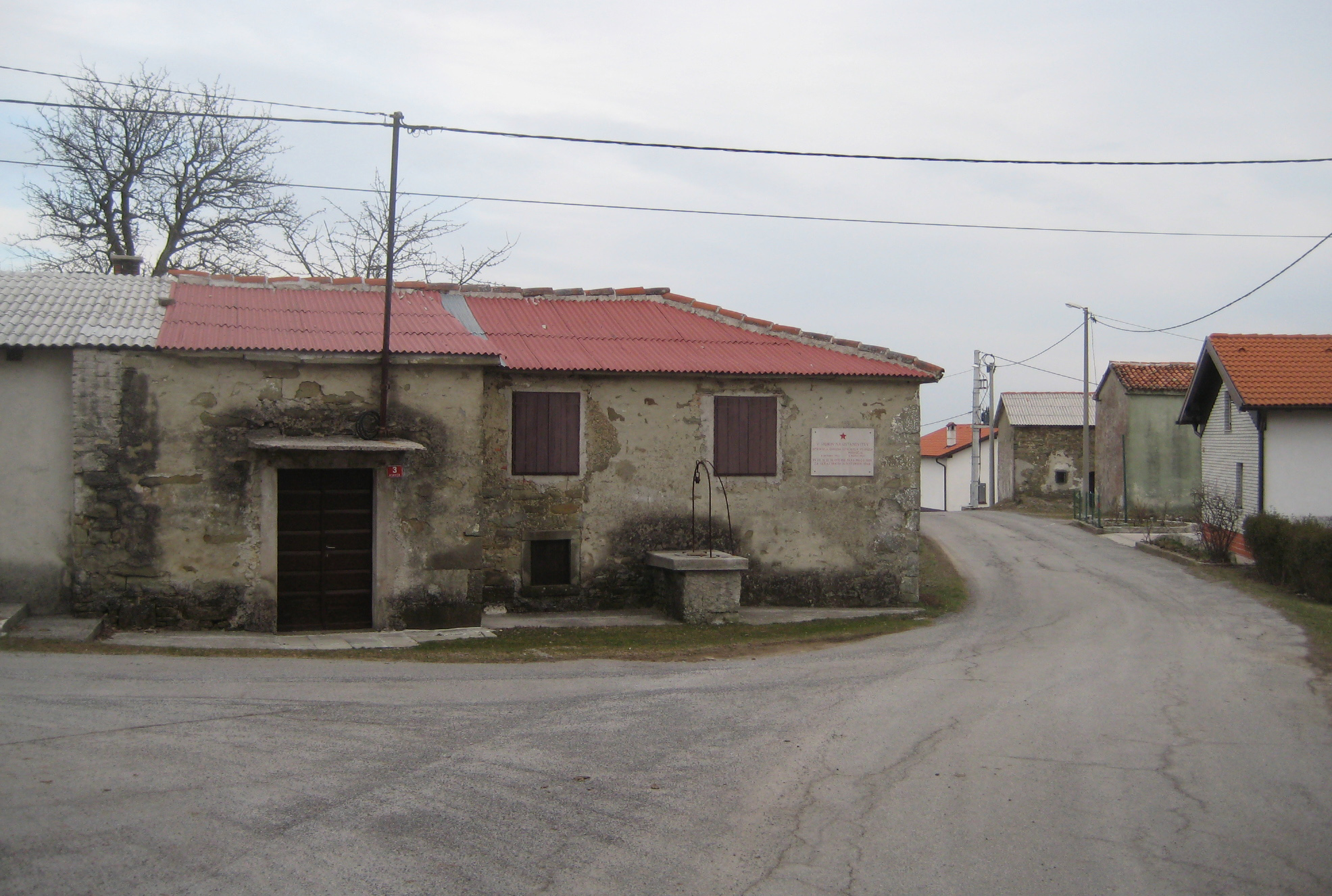

- Location in Slovenia
- Coordinates: 45°35′22.89″N 14°6′13.44″E
- Country: Slovenia
- Traditional region: Inner Carniola
- Statistical region: Littoral–Inner Carniola
- Municipality: Ilirska Bistrica

Area
  - Total: 4.07 km^{2} (1.57 sq mi)
- Elevation: 763.7 m (2,506 ft)

Population (2002)
  - Total: 31

Rjavče (pronounced [ˈɾjaːu̯tʃɛ]; Italian: Eriacci) is a small village in the hills northwest of Ilirska Bistrica in the Inner Carniola region of Slovenia.

The local church in the settlement is dedicated to Saint Maurus and belongs to the Parish of Pregarje.
