= Gornja Bitnja =

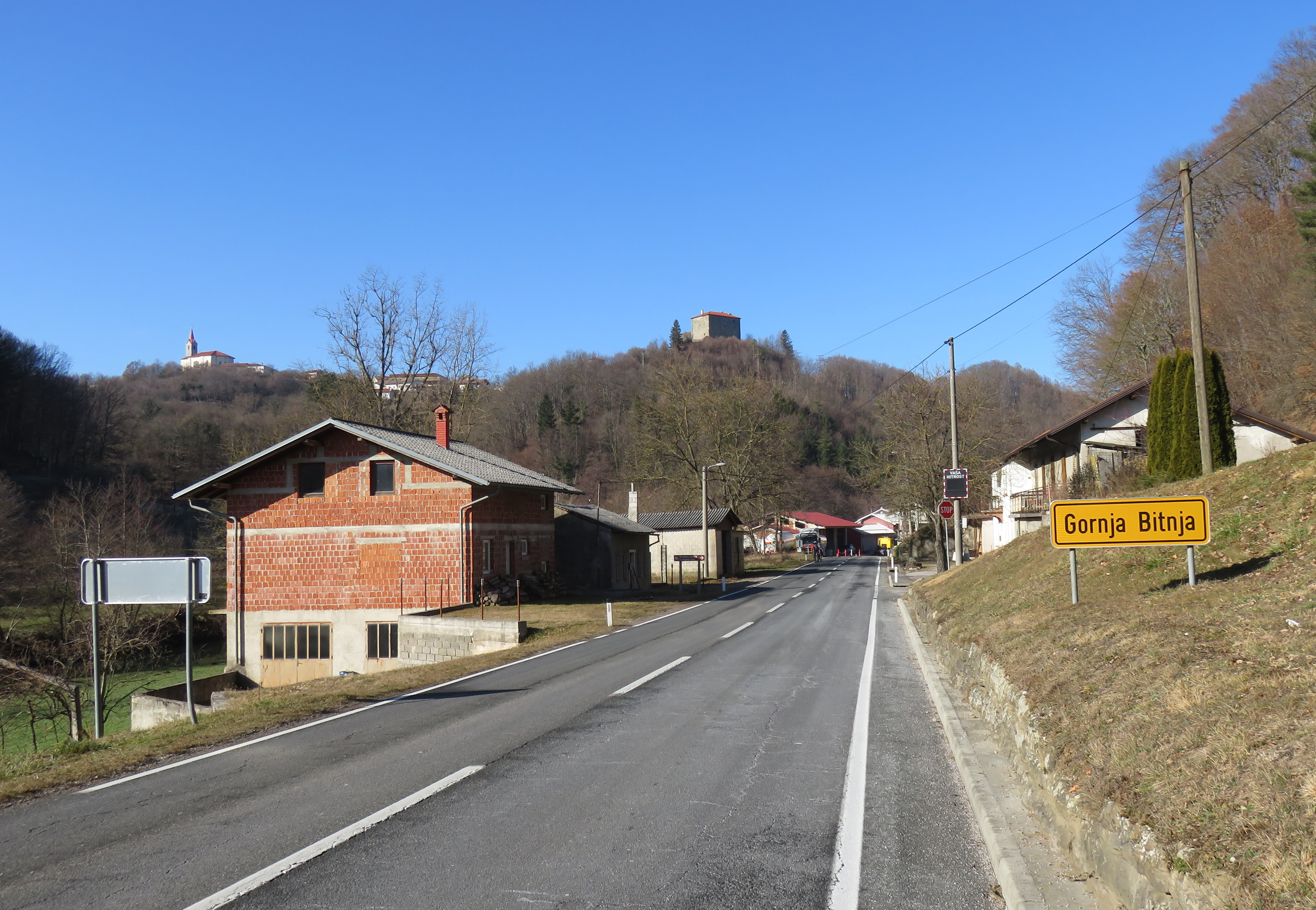

- Location in Slovenia
- Coordinates: 45°36′12.99″N 14°11′47.23″E
- Country: Slovenia
- Traditional region: Inner Carniola
- Statistical region: Littoral–Inner Carniola
- Municipality: Ilirska Bistrica

Area
  - Total: 1.13 km^{2} (0.44 sq mi)
- Elevation: 442.2 m (1,451 ft)

Population (2002)
  - Total: 42

Gornja Bitnja (pronounced [ˈɡoːɾnja ˈbiːtnja]; in older sources Bitinje, Italian: Bittigne di Sopra) is a small settlement on the right bank of the Reka River in the Municipality of Ilirska Bistrica in the Inner Carniola region of Slovenia.

== Turn Mansion ==
There is a 17th-century mansion in the settlement known as Turn Mansion or Turn Radlšek Mansion (Slovene: Turn Radlšek, German: Thurn-Radelsegg). It stands on a hill above the village, and it is an elongated rectangular building with two towers that projecting from it. It dates from the 17th century but was remodeled in the 18th century. There is a pond before the entrance.
