= Topolc =

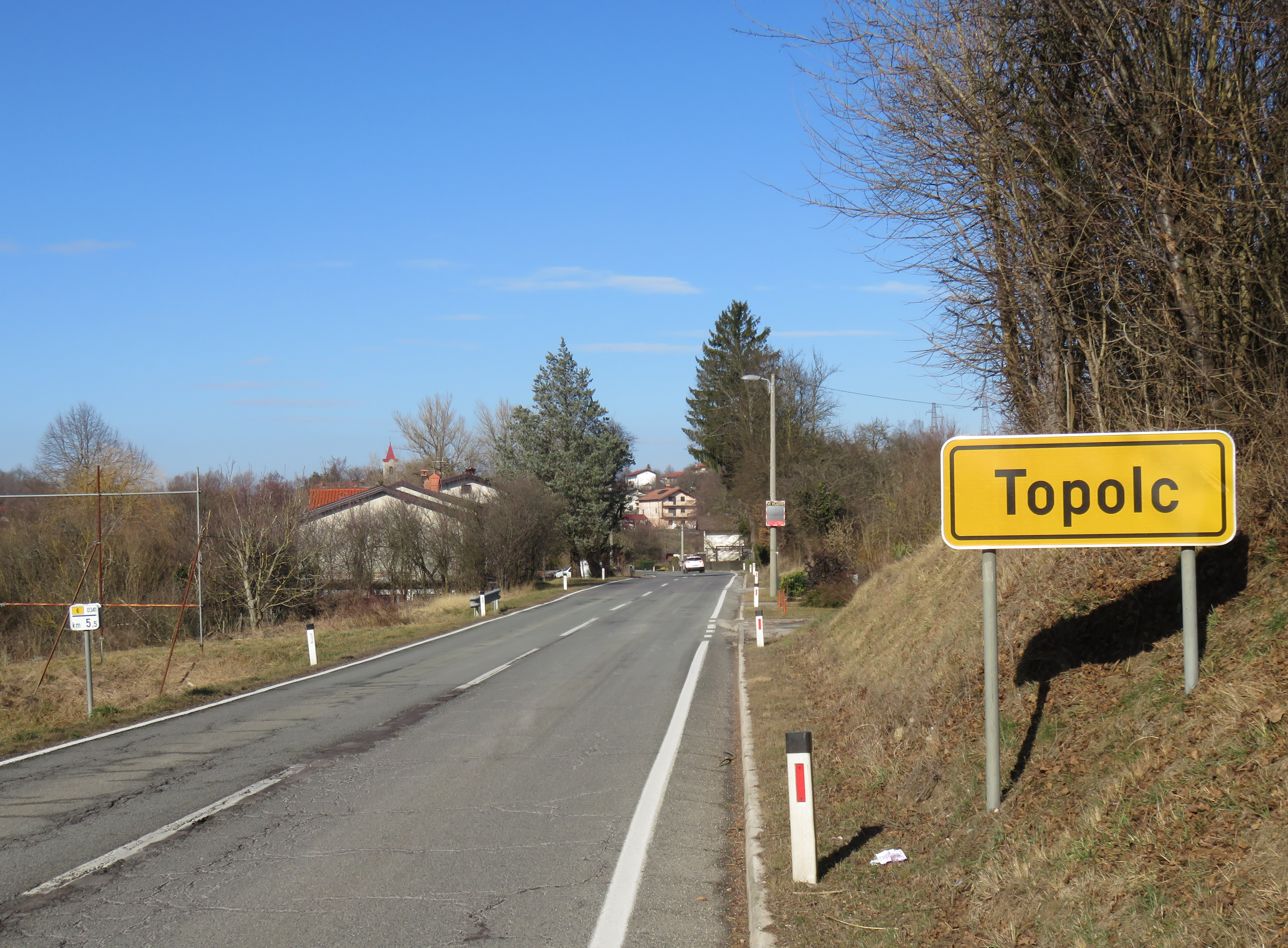

- Location in Slovenia
- Coordinates: 45°35′3.83″N 14°12′56.96″E
- Country: Slovenia
- Traditional region: Inner Carniola
- Statistical region: Littoral–Inner Carniola
- Municipality: Ilirska Bistrica

Area
  - Total: 3.58 km^{2} (1.38 sq mi)
- Elevation: 412.6 m (1,354 ft)

Population (2002)
  - Total: 344

Topolc (pronounced [tɔˈpoːu̯ts]; in older sources: Topolec, German: Topolz, Italian: Topolza) is a village immediately northwest of Ilirska Bistrica in the Inner Carniola region of Slovenia.

== Mass grave ==
Topolc is the site of a mass grave from the end of the Second World War. The Topolc Mill Mass Grave (Slovene: Grobišče pri topolškem mlinu) is located next to the Reka River, about 200 meters (660 ft) west of the main road, and contains the remains of about 80 German soldiers from the 97th Corps that fell at the beginning of May 1945.

== Church ==
The local church in the settlement is dedicated to Saint Stephen and belongs to the Parish of Ilirska Bistrica.
