= Nova Vas pri Jelšanah =

Village in the Inner Carniola region of Slovenia

- Location in Slovenia
- Coordinates: 45°30′18.4″N 14°17′51.15″E
- Country: Slovenia
- Traditional region: Inner Carniola
- Statistical region: Littoral–Inner Carniola
- Municipality: Ilirska Bistrica

Area
  - Total: 4.41 km^{2} (1.70 sq mi)
- Elevation: 557.2 m (1,828 ft)

Population (2002)
  - Total: 15

Nova Vas pri Jelšanah (pronounced [ˈnɔːʋa ˈʋaːs pɾi jɛu̯ˈʃaːnax]; Slovene: Nova vas pri Jelšanah) is a small village east of Jelšane in the Municipality of Ilirska Bistrica in the Inner Carniola region of Slovenia, close to the border with Croatia.

== Name ==
The name of the settlement was changed from Nova vas to Nova vas pri Jelšanah in 1953.

== Church ==
The small church in the settlement is dedicated to Saint Vitus and belongs to the Parish of Jelšane.
