= Podbeže =

- Village
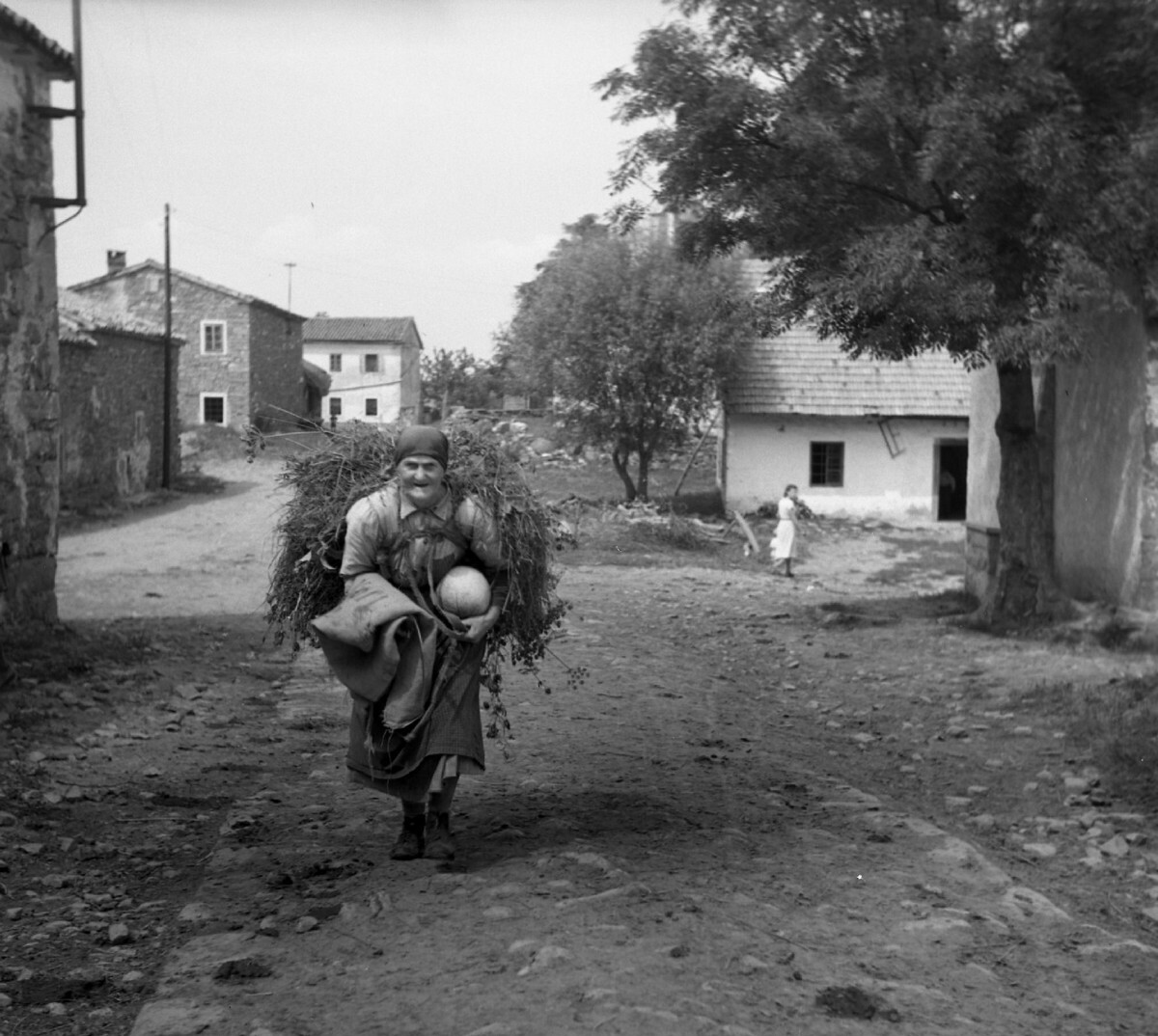
- Podbeže in 1955

- Location in Slovenia
- Coordinates: 45°32′47.77″N 14°9′9.25″E
- Country: Slovenia
- Traditional region: Inner Carniola
- Statistical region: Littoral–Inner Carniola
- Municipality: Ilirska Bistrica

Area
  - Total: 5.59 km^{2} (2.16 sq mi)
- Elevation: 604.8 m (1,984 ft)

Population (2002)
  - Total: 110

Podbeže (pronounced [pɔdˈbeːʒɛ]; Italian: Pobese) is a village north of Podgrad in the Municipality of Ilirska Bistrica in the Inner Carniola region of Slovenia.

== Mass graves ==
Podbeže is the site of a mass grave and a clandestine grave from the end of the Second World War. Both graves contain the remains of German soldiers from the 97th Corps that fell at the beginning of May 1945. The Zavrh Mass Grave (Slovene: Grobišče Zavrh) is located in the woods about 1.3 kilometers (0.81 mi) northeast of the village. It contains the remains of two soldiers. The Čelo Grave (Grob Čelo) is located in the woods about 1.5 kilometers (0.93 mi) southeast of the village church. It contains the remains of one soldier.

== Church ==
The local church in the settlement is dedicated to Mary Magdalene and belongs to the Parish of Hrušica.
