= Tominje =

- Village
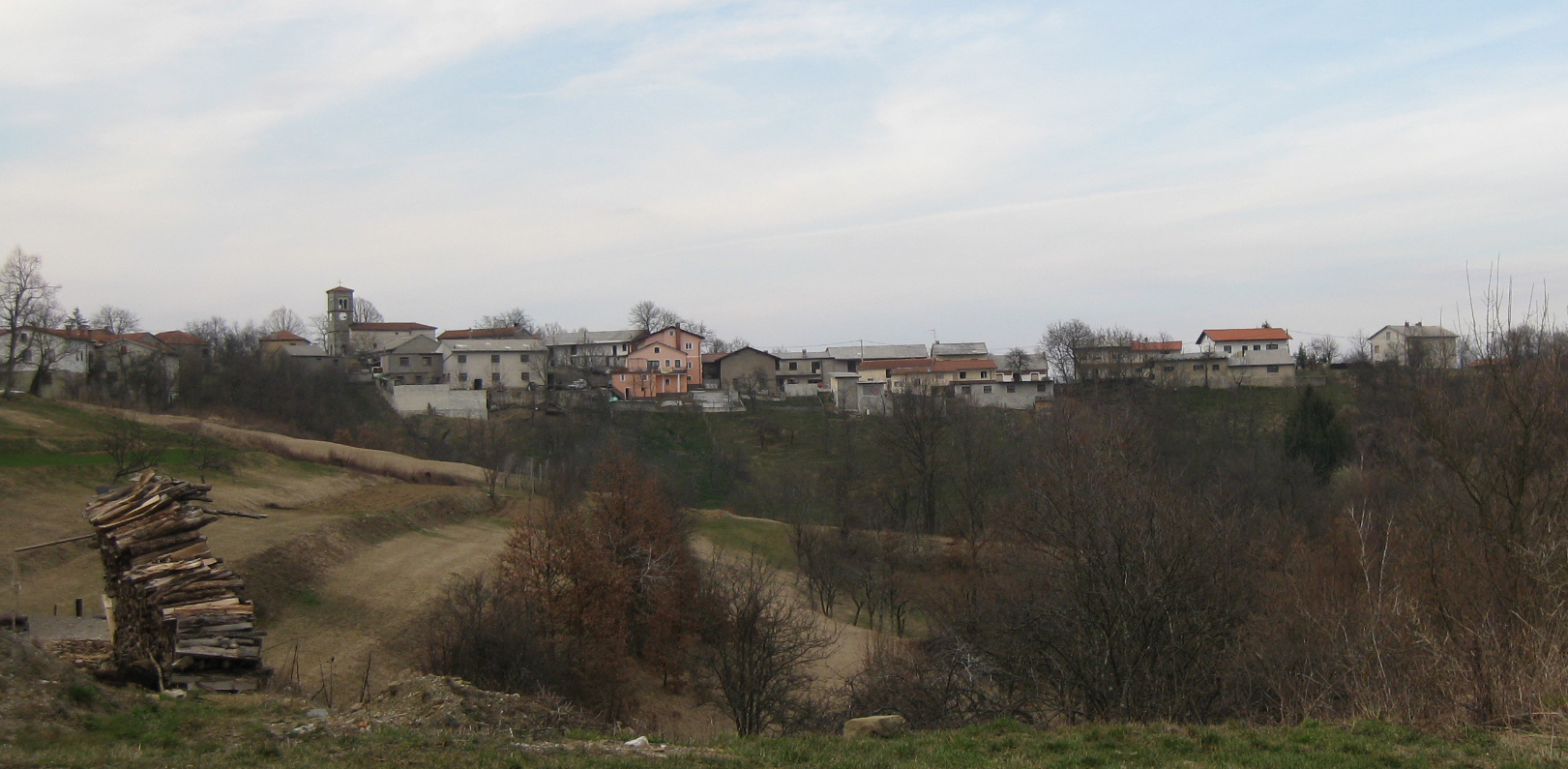

- Location in Slovenia
- Coordinates: 45°33′47.61″N 14°10′25.83″E
- Country: Slovenia
- Traditional region: Inner Carniola
- Statistical region: Littoral–Inner Carniola
- Municipality: Ilirska Bistrica

Area
  - Total: 4.02 km^{2} (1.55 sq mi)
- Elevation: 564.1 m (1,851 ft)

Population (2002)
  - Total: 129

Tominje (pronounced [ˈtoːminjɛ]; Italian: Tomigna) is a village west of Ilirska Bistrica in the Inner Carniola region of Slovenia.

The local church in the settlement is dedicated to Saint Vitus and belongs to the Parish of Knežak.
