= Koritnice =

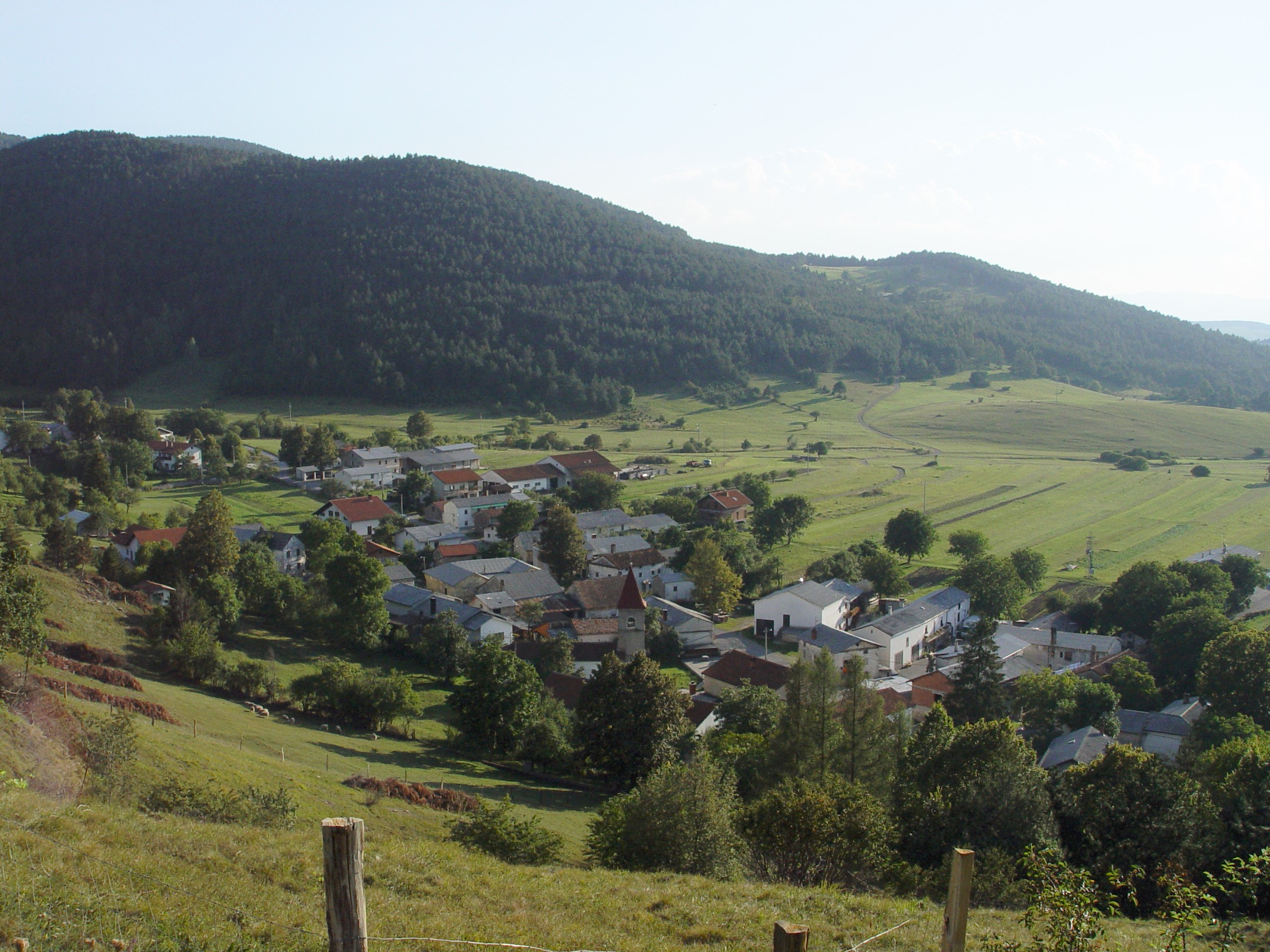

- Location in Slovenia
- Coordinates: 45°37′11.82″N 14°17′9.54″E
- Country: Slovenia
- Traditional region: Inner Carniola
- Statistical region: Littoral–Inner Carniola
- Municipality: Ilirska Bistrica

Area
  - Total: 37.51 km^{2} (14.48 sq mi)
- Elevation: 631.4 m (2,072 ft)

Population (2002)
  - Total: 152

Koritnice (pronounced [kɔˈɾiːtnitsɛ]; German: Koritnize, Italian: Coritenza) is a village east of Knežak in the Municipality of Ilirska Bistrica in the Inner Carniola region of Slovenia.

== Mass grave ==
Koritnice is the site of a mass grave from the Second World War. The Slope Cave Mass Grave (Slovene: Grobišče Jama pod klancem) is located about 2.5 kilometers (1.6 mi) east of the village. Based on descriptions by spelunkers and reports from local people, it contains the remains of German soldiers thrown into the shaft during the war.

== Churches ==
There are two churches in the settlement, both belonging to the Parish of Knežak. The church in the village is dedicated to Saint Anthony the Hermit and a church on a hill north of the settlement is dedicated to Saint Jerome.
