= Jasen, Ilirska Bistrica =

Jasen
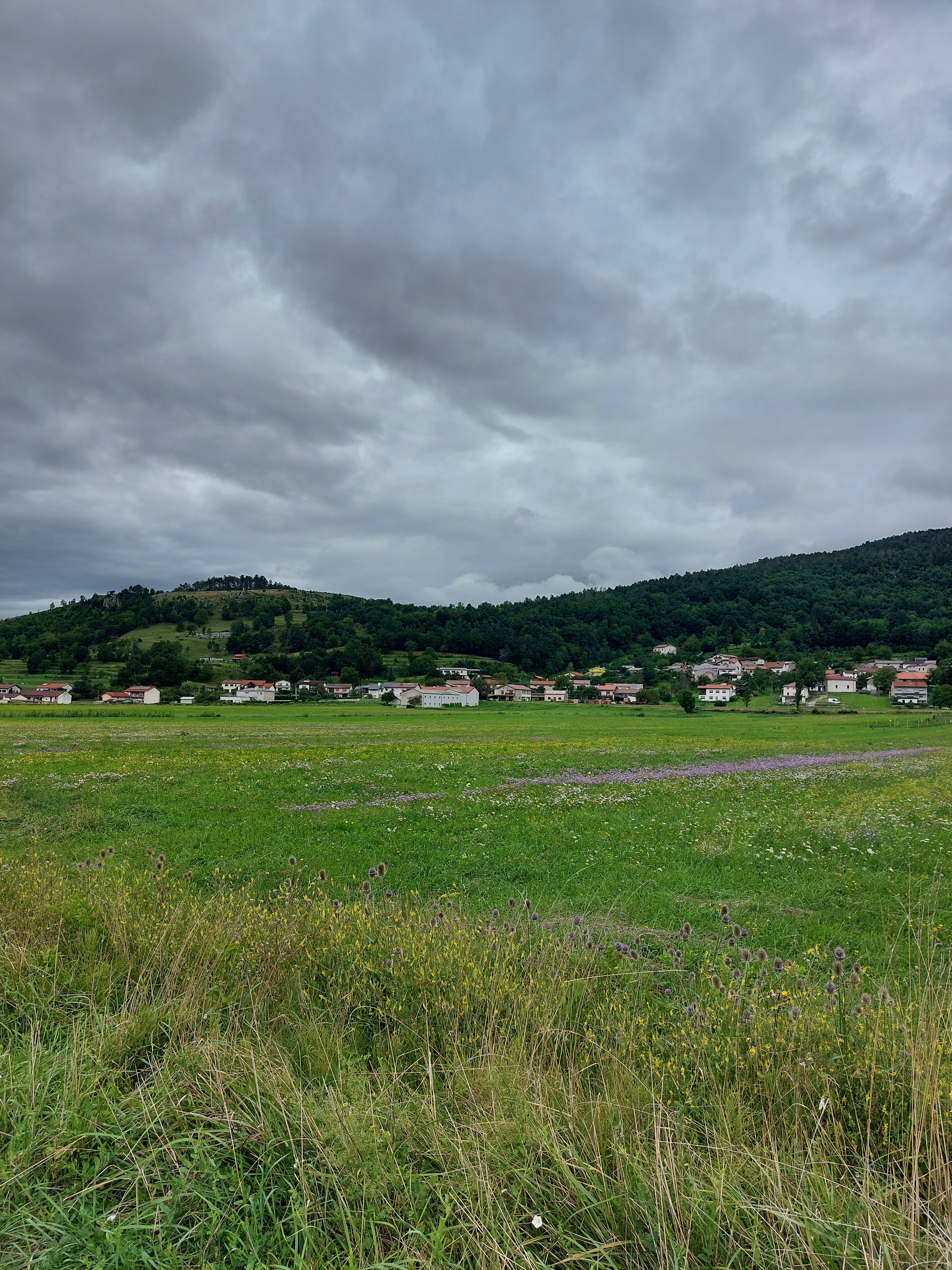

- Location in Slovenia
- Coordinates: 45°33′27.4″N 14°15′38.77″E
- Country: Slovenia
- Traditional region: Inner Carniola
- Statistical region: Littoral–Inner Carniola
- Municipality: Ilirska Bistrica

Area
  - Total: 2.26 km^{2} (0.87 sq mi)
- Elevation: 412.5 m (1,353 ft)

Population (2002)
  - Total: 259

Jasen (pronounced [ˈjaːsɛn]; Italian: Jasena) is a settlement immediately southeast of Ilirska Bistrica in the Inner Carniola region of Slovenia.

== Mass graves ==
Jasen is the site of five known mass graves or clandestine graves from the Second World War. Four of them contain the remains of German soldiers from the 97th Corps that fell at the beginning of May 1945. The Jasen Mass Grave (Slovene: Grobišče Jasen) encompasses three sites 70 meters (230 ft) from the house at Jasen no. 1a. They contain the remains of 84, eight, and six soldiers, respectively. The Jasen No. 11 Mass Grave (Grobišče pri hiši Jasen 11) lies in the yard of the house at Jasen no. 11a. It contains the remains of three or four soldiers. The Church Grave (Grob pri cerkvi) is located by an electric pole between the house at Jasen no. 16a and the church. It contains the remains of one soldier. The Jasen No. 4 Grave (Grob pri hiši Jasen 4) lies in the yard of the house at Jasen no. 4. It contains the remains of one soldier. The Baba Mass Grave (Grobišče Pod babo) is located in the bushes next to a fenced pasture about 300 meters (980 ft) northeast of the house at Jasen no. 48. It contains the remains of two Chetniks accidentally shot by German troops.

== Church ==
The small church in the settlement is dedicated to Saint Joachim and belongs to the Parish of Ilirska Bistrica.
