= Zarečica =

- Location in Slovenia
- Coordinates: 45°33′29.43″N 14°13′25.47″E
- Country: Slovenia
- Traditional region: Inner Carniola
- Statistical region: Littoral–Inner Carniola
- Municipality: Ilirska Bistrica

Area
  - Total: 1.77 km^{2} (0.68 sq mi)
- Elevation: 428.1 m (1,405 ft)

Population (2002)
  - Total: 124

Zarečica (pronounced [zaɾɛˈtʃiːtsa]; German: Saretschiza, Italian: Zarecizza) is a settlement west of Ilirska Bistrica in the Inner Carniola region of Slovenia.
