= Brkini Hills =

Region of Slovenia

Coordinates: 45°36′58″N 14°02′17″E

The Brkini Hills (pronounced [bəɾˈkiːni]; Slovene: Brkini; Croatian: Brkinija) is a hilly region in southwestern Slovenia.

== Geography ==
The Brkini Hills border the Reka River in the north, the Materija Valley (Matarsko podolje) in the southwest, the Karst Plateau (Kras) in the northwest, and the Jelšane Valley (Jelšansko podolje) in the southeast. The Brkini region is divided among the municipalities of Hrpelje-Kozina, Pivka, Ilirska Bistrica, and Divača. The region is 25 km (16 mi) long and 7 km (4.3 mi) wide and covers an area of 180 km^{2} (69 sq mi). The central part of the region has an elevation of 700 to 800 m (2,300 to 2,600 ft). The center of the region is the village of Pregarje. The climate is mild, and the geological basis is flyschy, with smaller limestone areas in the northeast. The region serves as a link between the Mediterranean and the continental part of Slovenia.

== Name ==
The name Brkini is believed to be of Italian origin because of the suffixation pattern. This indicates that the root of the name (brk-) may be derived from northern Italian bricco, bricca '(steep) slope'. Derivation from the Slavic noun brdo 'hill' is doubtful.

== Economy ==
The Brkini Hills are an economically underdeveloped region, with the main economic activity being fruit farming, in particular plums. Many people from the Brkini Hills commute to work to the nearby centers of Ilirska Bistrica, Podgrad, Hrpelje, and Kozina. During World War II, over one-third of the villages in the Brkini Hills were burned by Italian and German forces due to Partisan activity in the area, which significantly affected the development of the region. The population density is low, with people still leaving.
