= Novokračine =

- Location in Slovenia
- Coordinates: 45°29′33.61″N 14°18′30.86″E
- Country: Slovenia
- Traditional region: Inner Carniola
- Statistical region: Littoral–Inner Carniola
- Municipality: Ilirska Bistrica

Area
  - Total: 4.64 km^{2} (1.79 sq mi)
- Elevation: 489.7 m (1,607 ft)

Population (2002)
  - Total: 225

Novokračine (pronounced [nɔʋɔˈkɾaːtʃinɛ]; Italian: Craccina Nova) is a village east of Jelšane in the Municipality of Ilirska Bistrica in the Inner Carniola region of Slovenia on the border with Croatia.

== Name ==
Locally, the name Novokračine has been reduced via syncope to Nokračine.

== Mass graves ==
Novokračine is the site of four known mass graves or clandestine graves from the end of the Second World War. They contain the remains of German soldiers from the 97th Corps that fell at the beginning of May 1945. The Šušnjak Mass Grave (Slovene: Grobišče Šušnjak), also known as the Šunčak Mass Grave (Grobišče Šunčak), is located in the woods west of the village and contains the remains of up to 13 soldiers. The Kupnica Mass Grave (Grobišče Kupnica) encompasses two sites south of the settlement at former boneyard for dead livestock. They contain the remains of 70 and 12 soldiers, respectively. The Saint Catherine Mass Grave (Grobišče Sv. Katarina) encompasses three or four sites below the summit of Saint Catherine's Hill (Sveta Katarina) with the remains of an unspecified number of soldiers. The Tenth Cross Grave (Grob pri desetem križu) lies in an overgrown depression on the west slope of Saint Catherine's Hill and contains the remains of one soldier.

== Church ==
The local church in the settlement is dedicated to Saint Joseph and belongs to the Parish of Jelšane.
