= Dolenje pri Jelšanah =

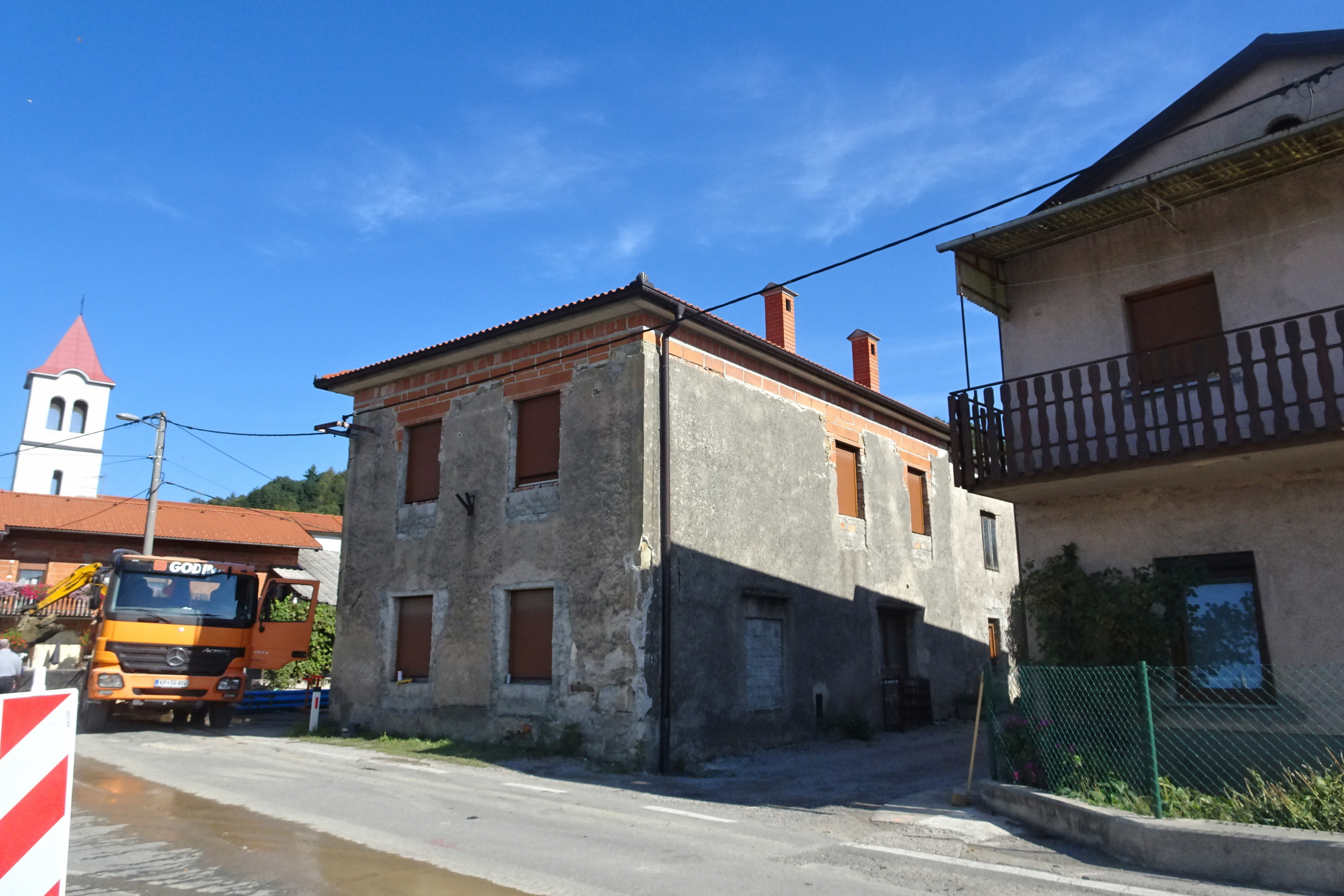

- Location in Slovenia
- Coordinates: 45°30′21.27″N 14°16′0.55″E
- Country: Slovenia
- Traditional region: Inner Carniola
- Statistical region: Littoral–Inner Carniola
- Municipality: Ilirska Bistrica

Area
  - Total: 6.95 km^{2} (2.68 sq mi)
- Elevation: 482.3 m (1,582 ft)

Population (2002)
  - Total: 203

Dolenje pri Jelšanah (pronounced [dɔˈleːnjɛ pɾi jɛlˈʃaːnax]; Italian: Dolegna) is a village north of Jelšane in the Municipality of Ilirska Bistrica in the Inner Carniola region of Slovenia, next to the border with Croatia. The settlement includes the hamlets of Dolnji Kraj (Slovene: Dolnji kraj), Gornji Kraj (Gornji kraj), and Vrh Žloštajna.

== Geography ==
The built-up part of the settlement occupies a small level area, the Dolenje Karst Field (Slovene: Dolenjsko polje), along the road from Ilirska Bistrica to Rijeka. Elevations in the settlement include Big Peak (Veliki vrh, 597 m), Brščice Hill (538 m), Kalič Hill (601 m), Kičiber Hill (also: Čičiber, 578 m), Kilovec Hill (516 m), Staregutnik Hill (568 m), and Stražnica Hill (also: Stražica, 577 m). Dolenje pri Jelšanah lies in a heavily karstified area with many caves, sinkholes, and losing streams. One of these streams flows through the village and disappears into Šapjan Cave (Šapjanska jama). Dolenje Creek (Dolenjski potok) has its source below Stražnica Hill and is known locally as Žloštajn Creek. The stream follows the road to Mala Bukovica, where it joins Molja Creek.

== Name ==
The name of the settlement was changed from Dolenje to Dolenje pri Jelšanah in 1955. The name Dolenje pri Jelšanah literally means 'Dolenje near Jelšane'. The toponym Dolenje is derived from the adjective dolenji 'lower'. It is an originally masculine accusative plural form (ending in -e) that was later reanalyzed as a feminine nominative plural. The toponym Dolenje is common in Slovenia and indicates that the settlement lay at a lower elevation than nearby settlements.

== Mass graves ==
Dolenje pri Jelšanah is the site of four known mass graves or clandestine graves from the end of the Second World War. They all contain the remains of German soldiers from the 97th Corps that fell at the beginning of May 1945. The Brajda Mass Grave (Slovene: Grobišče Brajda) is located in the overgrown Brajda meadow at the house at Dolenje pri Jelšanah no. 1. It contains the remains of six soldiers. The House No. 1 Grave (Grobišče pri hiši številka 1) is located in the yard of the same house. It contains the remains of one soldier. The House No. 8 Grave (Grobišče pri hiši številka 8) is located next to a fence under a spruce tree. It contains the remains of one soldier. The Farbečkina Mass Grave (Grobišče Farbečkina) is located north of the settlement, in an overgrown meadow on the west side of the road. It contains the remains of two soldiers.

== Church ==
The local church in the settlement is dedicated to Saint Anne and belongs to the Parish of Jelšane.
