= Vrbovo, Slovenia =

Vrbovo
- Location in Slovenia
- Coordinates: 45°33′9.77″N 14°16′38.38″E
- Country: Slovenia
- Traditional region: Inner Carniola
- Statistical region: Littoral–Inner Carniola
- Municipality: Ilirska Bistrica

Area
  - Total: 5.51 km^{2} (2.13 sq mi)
- Elevation: 426 m (1,398 ft)

Population (2002)
  - Total: 315

Vrbovo (pronounced [ʋəɾˈbɔːʋɔ]; German: Werbowo, Italian: Verbovo) is a village southeast of Ilirska Bistrica in the Inner Carniola region of Slovenia.

The local church is dedicated to the Holy Cross and belongs to the Parish of Ilirska Bistrica.
