= Veliko Brdo, Slovenia =

Veliko Brdo
- Location in Slovenia
- Coordinates: 45°30′54.83″N 14°13′14.69″E
- Country: Slovenia
- Traditional region: Inner Carniola
- Statistical region: Littoral–Inner Carniola
- Municipality: Ilirska Bistrica

Area
  - Total: 7.07 km^{2} (2.73 sq mi)
- Elevation: 627.1 m (2,057 ft)

Population (2002)
  - Total: 98

Veliko Brdo (pronounced [ˈʋeːlikɔ ˈbəɾdɔ]; Italian: Berdo d'Elsane) is a village southwest of Ilirska Bistrica in the Inner Carniola region of Slovenia, close to the border with Croatia.

== Mass graves ==
Veliko Brdo is the site of three mass graves or clandestine graves from the end of the Second World War. They all contain the remains of German soldiers from the 97th Corps that fell at the beginning of May 1945. The Church Mass Grave (Slovene: Grobišče pri cerkvi) is located at the northeast edge of Holy Trinity Church, on the west edge of the village. It contains the remains of seventeen soldiers. The Ilovce Mass Grave (Grobišče Ilovce) is located in the Ilovce meadow at the crossroads by house no. 59 south of the village. It contains the remains of seven soldiers. The Hrbe Grave (Grobišče Hrbe), also known as the Hrebeh Grave (Grobišče Hrebeh), is located a meadow alongside the road south of the village. It contains the remains of one soldier. (Note: Links are to the Geopedia text descriptions of the graves. The site has mislabeled the map positions by marking the Church Mass Grave as "Ilovce," the Hrbe Mass Grave as "Church," and the Ilovce Mass Grave as "Hrbe.")

== Church ==
The local church in the settlement is dedicated to the Holy Trinity and belongs to the Parish of Jelšane.
