= Ratečevo Brdo =

- Location in Slovenia
- Coordinates: 45°37′6.63″N 14°12′14.16″E
- Country: Slovenia
- Traditional region: Inner Carniola
- Statistical region: Littoral–Inner Carniola
- Municipality: Ilirska Bistrica

Area
  - Total: 3.04 km^{2} (1.17 sq mi)
- Elevation: 538.5 m (1,767 ft)

Population (2002)
  - Total: 33

Ratečevo Brdo (pronounced [ˈɾaːtɛtʃɛʋɔ ˈbəɾdɔ]; German: Ratetschewo Berdo, Italian: Ratecevo in Monte) is a small village in the hills north of Ilirska Bistrica in the Inner Carniola region of Slovenia.

The local church in the settlement is dedicated to the Virgin Mary and belongs to the Parish of Zagorje.
