= Koseze, Ilirska Bistrica =

Koseze
- Location in Slovenia
- Coordinates: 45°33′9.46″N 14°14′30.3″E
- Country: Slovenia
- Traditional region: Inner Carniola
- Statistical region: Littoral–Inner Carniola
- Municipality: Ilirska Bistrica

Area
  - Total: 2.17 km^{2} (0.84 sq mi)
- Elevation: 405.9 m (1,332 ft)

Population (2002)
  - Total: 371

Koseze (pronounced [kɔˈseːzɛ]; German: Kosese, Italian: Cossese) is a settlement on the left bank of the Reka River southwest of Ilirska Bistrica in the Inner Carniola region of Slovenia.

== History ==
During the short ten-day Slovene Independence War in 1991, Yugoslav and Slovene troops met in a small engagement ending with a handful of casualties in the village of Koseze.

== Church ==
The small church in the settlement is dedicated to Mary Magdalene and belongs to the Parish of Ilirska Bistrica.
