= Jablanica, Ilirska Bistrica =

Jablanica
- Location in Slovenia
- Coordinates: 45°32′22.82″N 14°17′56.06″E
- Country: Slovenia
- Traditional region: Inner Carniola
- Statistical region: Littoral–Inner Carniola
- Municipality: Ilirska Bistrica

Area
  - Total: 6.85 km^{2} (2.64 sq mi)
- Elevation: 427.4 m (1,402 ft)

Population (2002)
  - Total: 149

Jablanica (pronounced [ˈjaːblanitsa]; German: Jablanitz, Italian: Castel Iablanizza) is a settlement southeast of Ilirska Bistrica in the Inner Carniola region of Slovenia.

== Mass graves ==
Jablanica is the site of three known mass graves or clandestine graves from the end of the Second World War. They all contain the remains of German soldiers from the 97th Corps that were killed at the beginning of May 1945. The Mountain Fields Mass Grave (Slovene: Grobišče Njivce v gorah), also known as the Mountain Mass Grave (Grobišče Gora), lies in a meadow about 1.6 kilometers (0.99 mi) northeast of Jablanica and contains the remains of 10 soldiers. The Solne Mass Grave (Grobišče Solne) lies in a meadow about 150 meters (490 ft) north of the chapel-shrine at Jablanica no. 13 and contains the remains of four soldiers. The Yard Grave (Grobišče Vrt) is located in a meadow near two spruce trees at the house at Jablanica no. 26 and contains the remains of one soldier.

== Church ==
The small church in the settlement is dedicated to Our Lady of the Snows and belongs to the Parish of Ilirska Bistrica.
