= Vrbica, Ilirska Bistrica =

Vrbica
- Location in Slovenia
- Coordinates: 45°32′48″N 14°17′09″E
- Country: Slovenia
- Traditional region: Inner Carniola
- Statistical region: Littoral–Inner Carniola
- Municipality: Ilirska Bistrica

Area
  - Total: 1.93 km^{2} (0.75 sq mi)
- Elevation: 425.2 m (1,395 ft)

Population (2002)
  - Total: 145

Vrbica (pronounced [ʋəɾˈbiːtsa]; Italian: Verbizza) is a village southeast of Ilirska Bistrica in the Inner Carniola region of Slovenia.
