= Račice, Ilirska Bistrica =

Račice
- Village
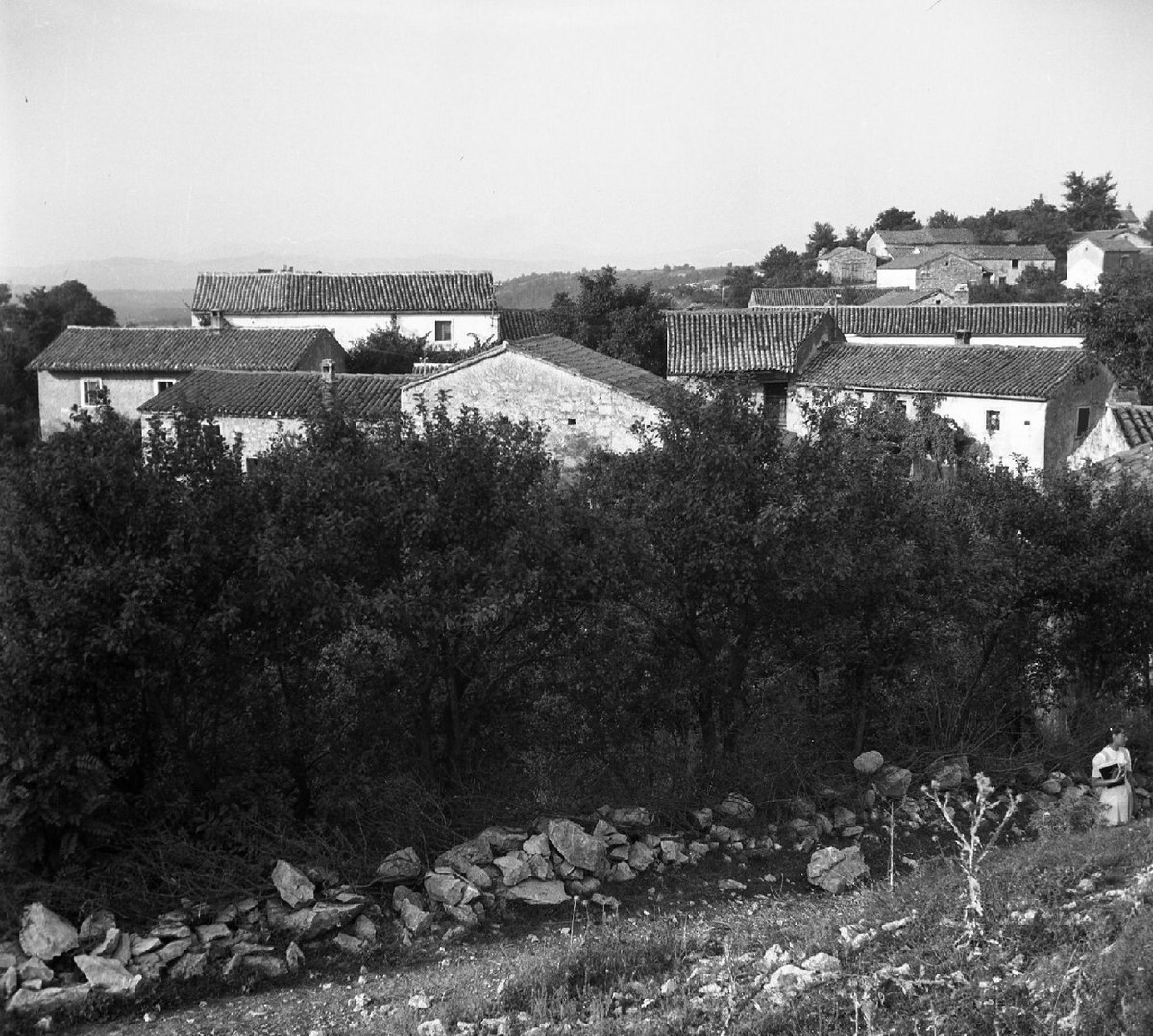
- Račice in 1955

- Location in Slovenia
- Coordinates: 45°30′48.15″N 14°9′41.45″E
- Country: Slovenia
- Traditional region: Inner Carniola
- Statistical region: Littoral–Inner Carniola
- Municipality: Ilirska Bistrica

Area
  - Total: 11.94 km^{2} (4.61 sq mi)
- Elevation: 586.4 m (1,924 ft)

Population (2002)
  - Total: 160

Račice (pronounced [ˈɾaːtʃitsɛ]; Italian: Racizze) is a village southeast of Podgrad in the Municipality of Ilirska Bistrica in the Inner Carniola region of Slovenia, near the border with Croatia.

== Clandestine grave ==
Račice is the site of a clandestine grave dating from the end of the Second World War. The Gradac Grave (Slovene: Grob Gradac), located northwest of the village, contains the remains of a German soldier from the 97th Corps that fell at the beginning of May 1945.

== Church ==
The local church is dedicated to Saint Roch and belongs to the Parish of Podgrad.
