= Sušak, Ilirska Bistrica =

Sušak
- Interactive map of Sušak
- Location in Slovenia
- Coordinates: 45°29′13.28″N 14°19′38.81″E
- Country: Slovenia
- Traditional region: Inner Carniola
- Statistical region: Littoral–Inner Carniola
- Municipality: Ilirska Bistrica

Area
  - Total: 4.9 km^{2} (1.9 sq mi)
- Elevation: 512 m (1,680 ft)

Population (2002)
  - Total: 75

Sušak (pronounced [suˈʃaːk]; Italian: Sussa) is a small village in the Municipality of Ilirska Bistrica in the Inner Carniola region of Slovenia, close to the border with Croatia.

== Mass grave ==
Sušak is the site of a mass grave from the end of the Second World War. The Hunting Lodge Mass Grave (Slovene: Grobišče pri lovskem domu) lies about 600 meters (2,000 ft) east of the center of Sušak and about 30 meters (98 ft) from a hunting lodge. It contains the remains of German soldiers from the 97th Corps that were killed at the beginning of May 1945.

== Church ==
The local church in the settlement is dedicated to John the Baptist and belongs to the Parish of Jelšane.
