= Rečica, Ilirska Bistrica =

Rečica
- Location in Slovenia
- Coordinates: 45°34′16.44″N 14°13′31.28″E
- Country: Slovenia
- Traditional region: Inner Carniola
- Statistical region: Littoral–Inner Carniola
- Municipality: Ilirska Bistrica

Area
  - Total: 0.58 km^{2} (0.22 sq mi)
- Elevation: 400.4 m (1,314 ft)

Population (2002)
  - Total: 94

Rečica (pronounced [ɾɛˈtʃiːtsa]) is a small settlement on the left bank of the Reka River next to Ilirska Bistrica in the Inner Carniola region of Slovenia.
