= Pavlica, Ilirska Bistrica =

Pavlica
- Location in Slovenia
- Coordinates: 45°31′18.3″N 14°12′1.1″E
- Country: Slovenia
- Traditional region: Inner Carniola
- Statistical region: Littoral–Inner Carniola
- Municipality: Ilirska Bistrica

Area
  - Total: 0.74 km^{2} (0.29 sq mi)
- Elevation: 623.4 m (2,045 ft)

Population (2002)
  - Total: 17

Pavlica (pronounced [ˈpaːu̯litsa]; Italian: Paulizza) is a small settlement southwest of Ilirska Bistrica in the Inner Carniola region of Slovenia.
