= Podtabor, Ilirska Bistrica =

Podtabor
- Location in Slovenia
- Coordinates: 45°36′22.85″N 14°13′41.55″E
- Country: Slovenia
- Traditional region: Inner Carniola
- Statistical region: Littoral–Inner Carniola
- Municipality: Ilirska Bistrica

Area
  - Total: 1.02 km^{2} (0.39 sq mi)
- Elevation: 553.2 m (1,815 ft)

Population (2002)
  - Total: 37

Podtabor (pronounced [pɔˈtaːbɔr], locally Podtaber) is a small settlement north of Ilirska Bistrica in the Inner Carniola region of Slovenia.
