= Podstenje =

Village in Slovenia

- Location in Slovenia
- Coordinates: 45°35′56.43″N 14°13′15.61″E
- Country: Slovenia
- Traditional region: Inner Carniola
- Statistical region: Littoral–Inner Carniola
- Municipality: Ilirska Bistrica

Area
  - Total: 1.98 km^{2} (0.76 sq mi)
- Elevation: 486.1 m (1,595 ft)

Population (2002)
  - Total: 71

Podstenje (pronounced [pɔtˈsteːnjɛ]; Italian: Postegna) is a village north of Ilirska Bistrica in the Inner Carniola region of Slovenia.

The local church in the settlement is dedicated to Saint Anthony of Padua and belongs to the Parish of Ilirska Bistrica.
