= Sabonje =

- Village
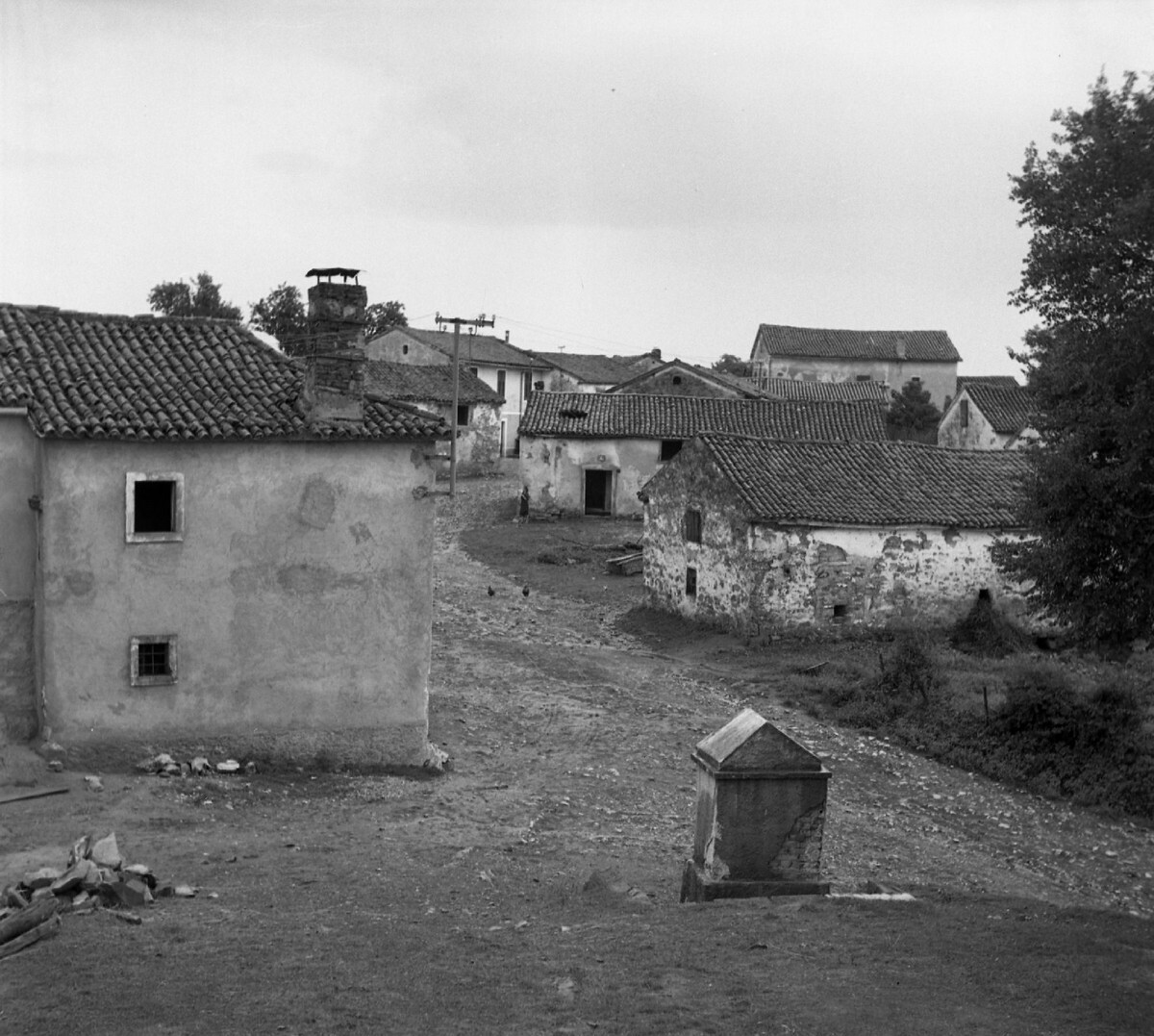
- Sabonje in 1955

- Location in Slovenia
- Coordinates: 45°32′5.14″N 14°10′56.36″E
- Country: Slovenia
- Traditional region: Inner Carniola
- Statistical region: Littoral–Inner Carniola
- Municipality: Ilirska Bistrica

Area
  - Total: 6.12 km^{2} (2.36 sq mi)
- Elevation: 589.4 m (1,934 ft)

Population (2002)
  - Total: 79

Sabonje (pronounced [saˈboːnjɛ]; Italian: Sabogna) is a village southwest of Ilirska Bistrica in the Inner Carniola region of Slovenia.

== Clandestine grave ==
Sabonje is the site of a clandestine grave from the end of the Second World War. The Podbeže No. 40 Grave (Slovene: Grobišče Podbeže 40) lies under a walnut tree opposite the house at Podbeže no. 40. It contains the remains of a German soldier from the 97th Corps that fell at the beginning of May 1945.

== Church ==
The local church in the settlement is dedicated to Saint Martin and belongs to the Parish of Podgrad.
