= Dolnja Bitnja =

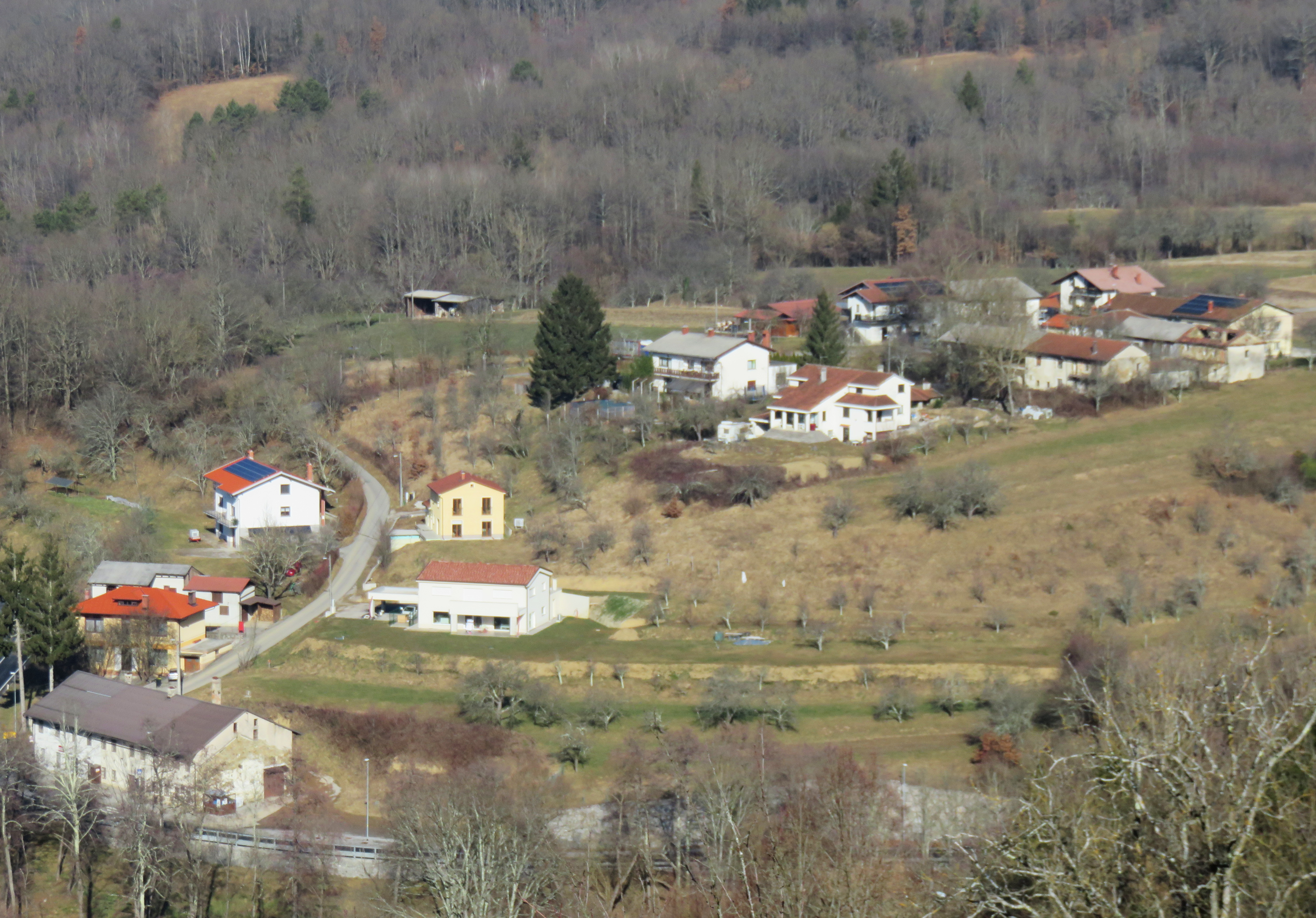

- Location in Slovenia
- Coordinates: 45°36′34.75″N 14°11′9.53″E
- Country: Slovenia
- Traditional region: Inner Carniola
- Statistical region: Littoral–Inner Carniola
- Municipality: Ilirska Bistrica

Area
  - Total: 1.69 km^{2} (0.65 sq mi)
- Elevation: 392.2 m (1,287 ft)

Population (2002)
  - Total: 74

Dolnja Bitnja (pronounced [ˈdoːlnja ˈbiːtnja]; in older sources Bitinje, Italian: Bittigne di Sotto) is a small settlement northwest of Ilirska Bistrica in the Inner Carniola region of Slovenia.
