= Prem, Ilirska Bistrica =

Prem
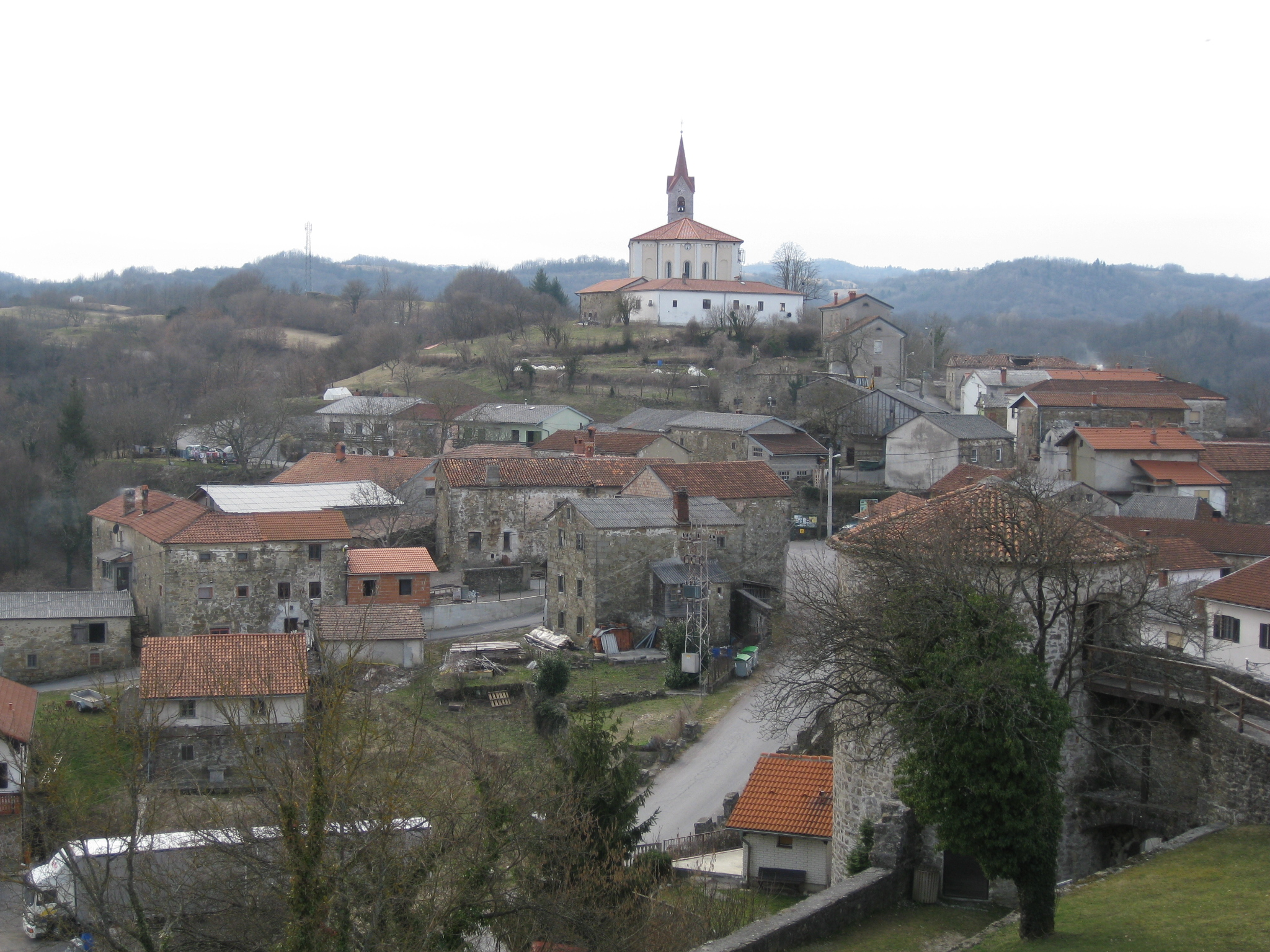

- Location in Slovenia
- Coordinates: 45°36′16.55″N 14°11′0.11″E
- Country: Slovenia
- Traditional region: Inner Carniola
- Statistical region: Littoral–Inner Carniola
- Municipality: Ilirska Bistrica

Area
  - Total: 3.2 km^{2} (1.2 sq mi)
- Elevation: 475 m (1,558 ft)

Population (2002)
  - Total: 184
- Climate: Cfb

Prem (pronounced [ˈpreːm]; Italian: Primano) is a village above the left bank of the Reka River northwest of Ilirska Bistrica in the Inner Carniola region of Slovenia.

== Name ==
The village was first attested in written sources as Prem in 1213 (and as Primo in 1234 and Prême in 1276). The name may be derived from the Slavic noun *prějьmъ 'that which is received'. If so, the meaning of the name would be similar to 'fief'; that is, land received for use from a superior feudal lord.

== History ==
The early history of Prem is closely connected with Prem Castle, where a district administration and court were active until 1840. During the Second World War, the Partisans attacked an Italian antiaircraft installment near Prem in 1941. A Partisan rally attended by about 1,700 people was held in Prem in 1944. Toward the end of the war, German artillery caused extensive damage to the village on April 29, 1945. A road from Dolnja Bitnja to Prem was built by a youth labor brigade in 1956/57.

=== Mass graves ===
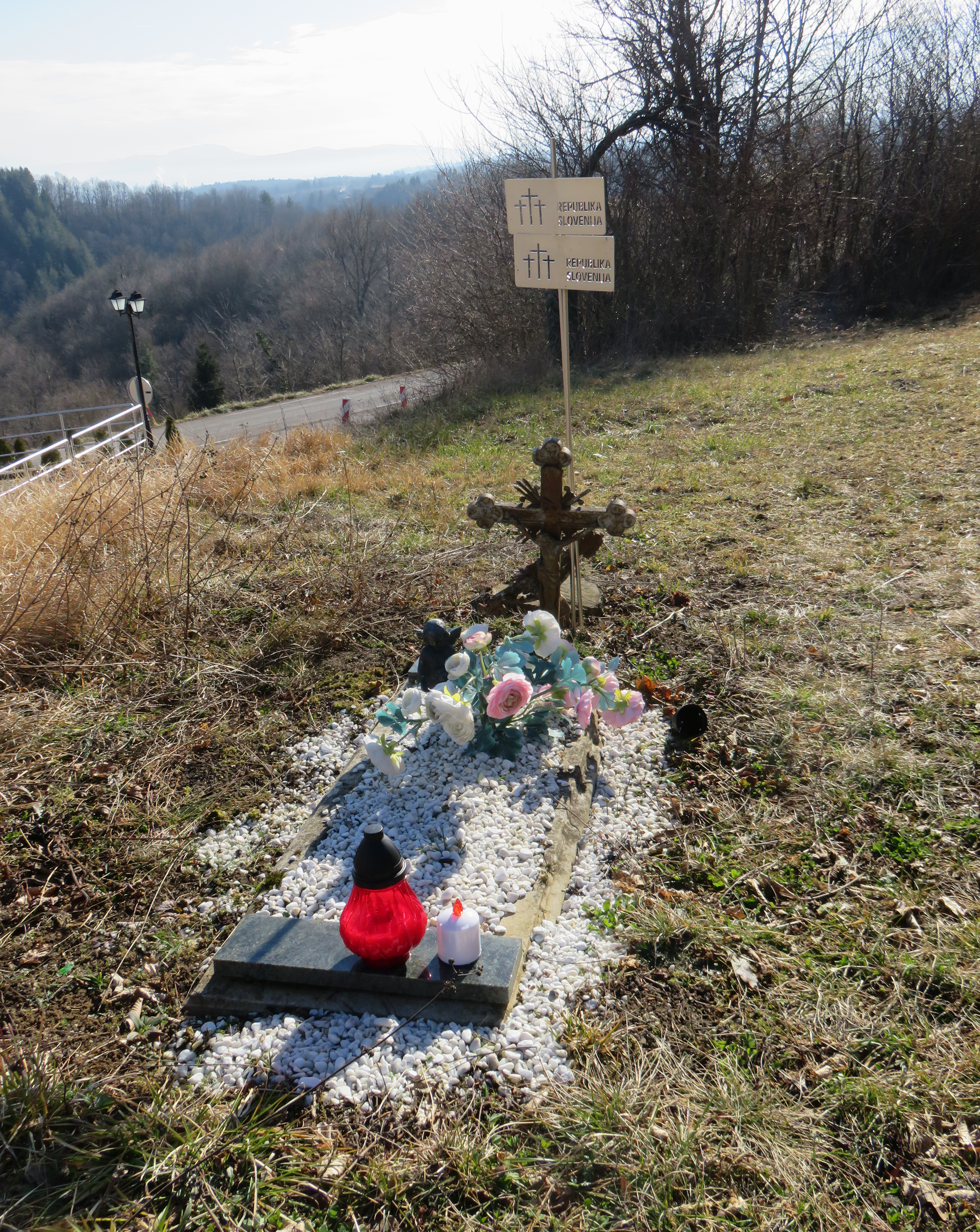
The Nogradec 2 Grave

Prem is the site of a mass grave and a clandestine grave from the end of World War II. They both contain the remains of German soldiers from the 97th Corps that fell at the beginning of May 1945. The Nogradec 1 Mass Grave (Slovene: Grobišče Nogradec 1) lies next to the road by the cemetery, in a former roadside trench. It contains the remains of 23 soldiers, as well as animals and military equipment. The Nogradec 2 Grave (Grobišče Nogradec 2) lies next to the first and contains the remains of a German officer.

== Prem Castle ==
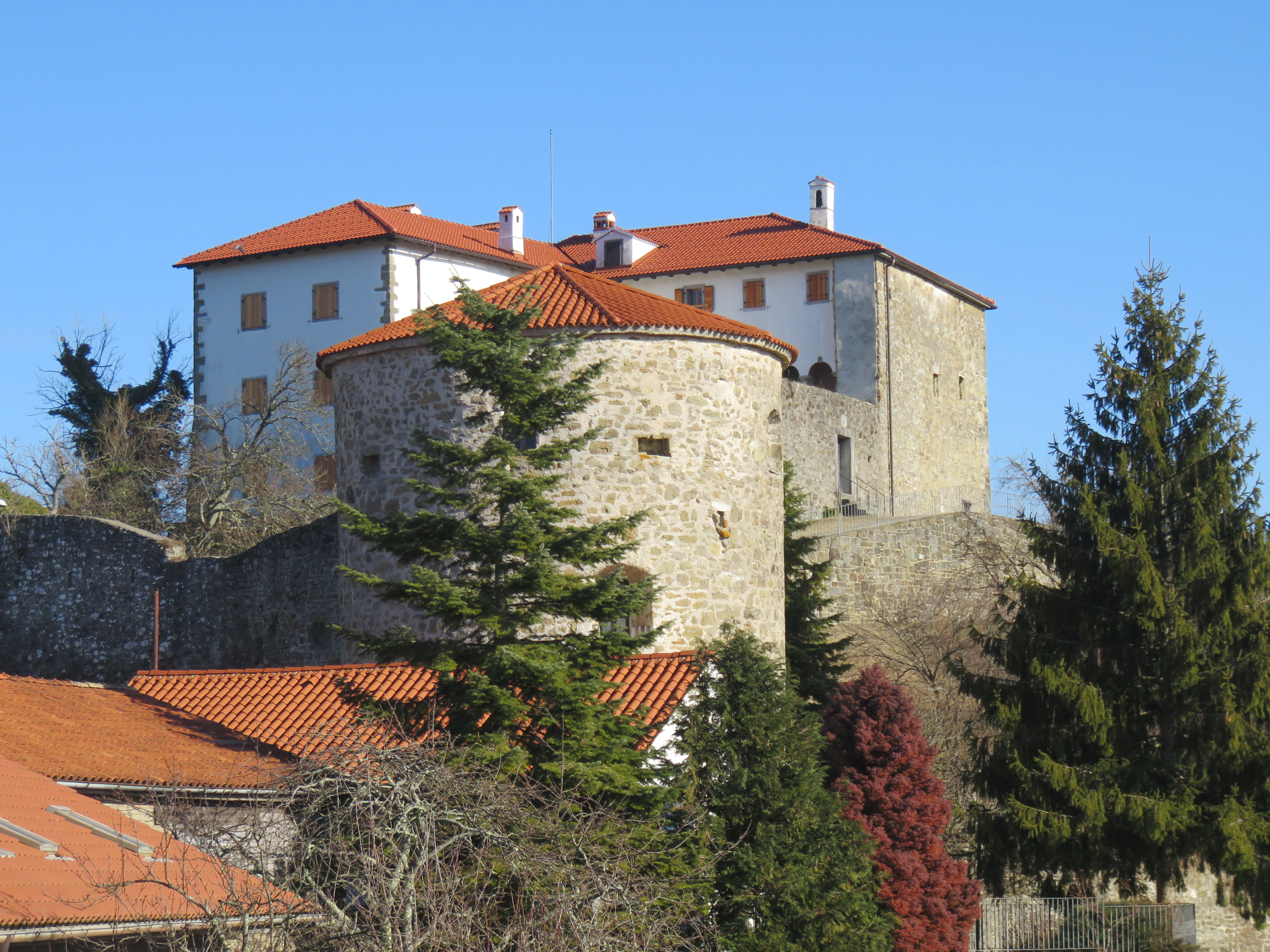
Prem Castle

Prem Castle was first mentioned in written sources in 1213 as the property of Udo de Prem. It probably stands on the site of an old Roman fortification called Castra prima, which was used as a watchpoint during campaigns against the Iapydes. The castle came under the ownership of the Patriarchate of Aquileia in the 13th century, and it was later owned by the Lords of Duino, the Lords of Walsee, and then the Habsburgs.

== Church ==
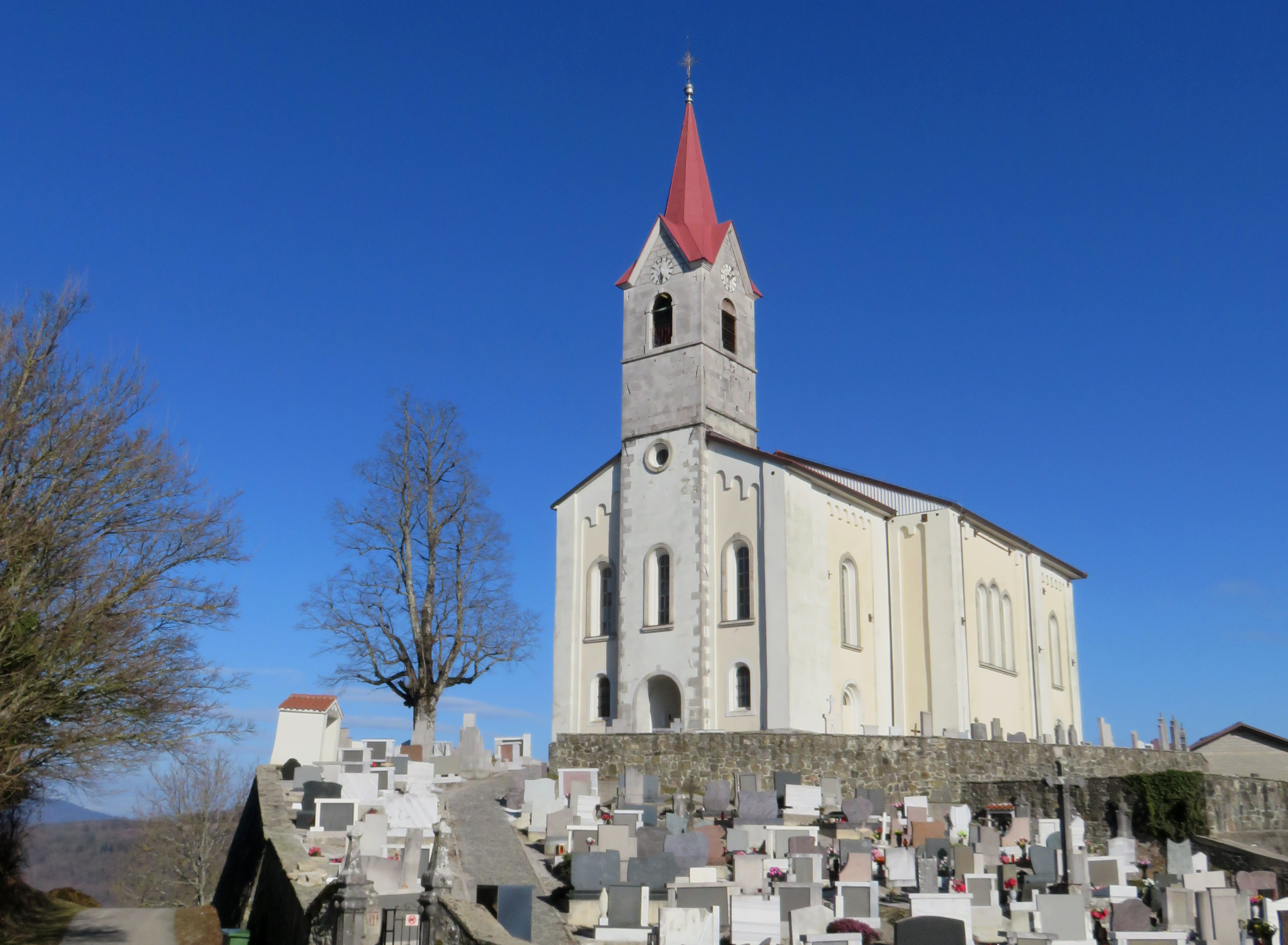
Saint Helena's Church

The parish church in the settlement is dedicated to Saint Helena and belongs to the Koper Diocese.

== Notable people ==
Notable people that were born or lived in Prem include:

- Dragotin Kette (1876–1899), poet
- Karel Lavrič (1818–1876), politician
