= Hrušica, Ilirska Bistrica =

Hrušica
- Village
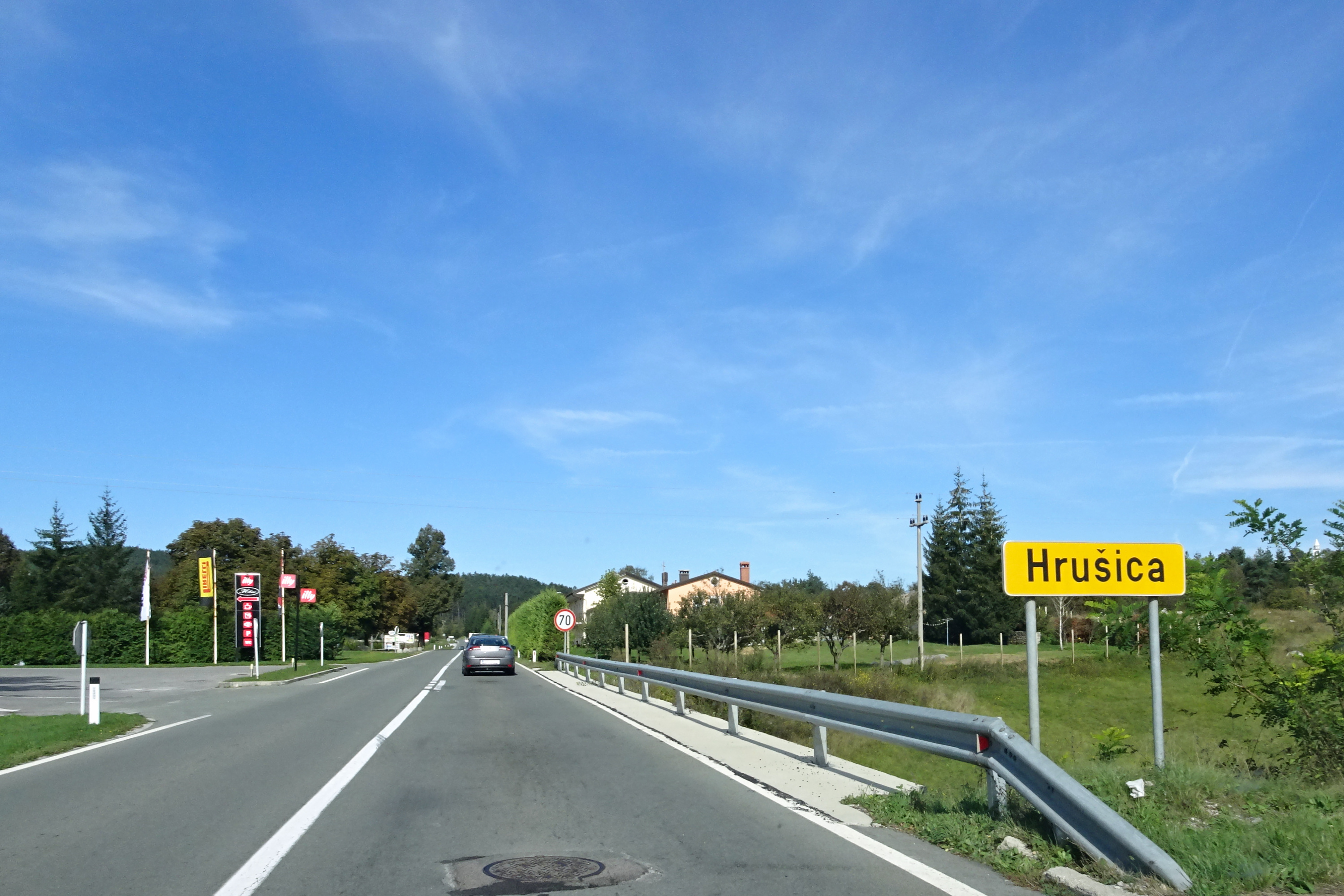

- Location in Slovenia
- Coordinates: 45°32′25.21″N 14°7′16.64″E
- Country: Slovenia
- Traditional region: Inner Carniola
- Statistical region: Littoral–Inner Carniola
- Municipality: Ilirska Bistrica

Area
  - Total: 11.99 km^{2} (4.63 sq mi)
- Elevation: 579.6 m (1,902 ft)

Population (2002)
  - Total: 258

Hrušica (pronounced [ˈxɾuːʃitsa]; Italian: Crusizza) is a village northwest of Podgrad in the Municipality of Ilirska Bistrica in the Inner Carniola region of Slovenia.

The parish church in the settlement is dedicated to Saint Chrysogonus (Slovene: sveti Krizogon) and belongs to the Koper Diocese.

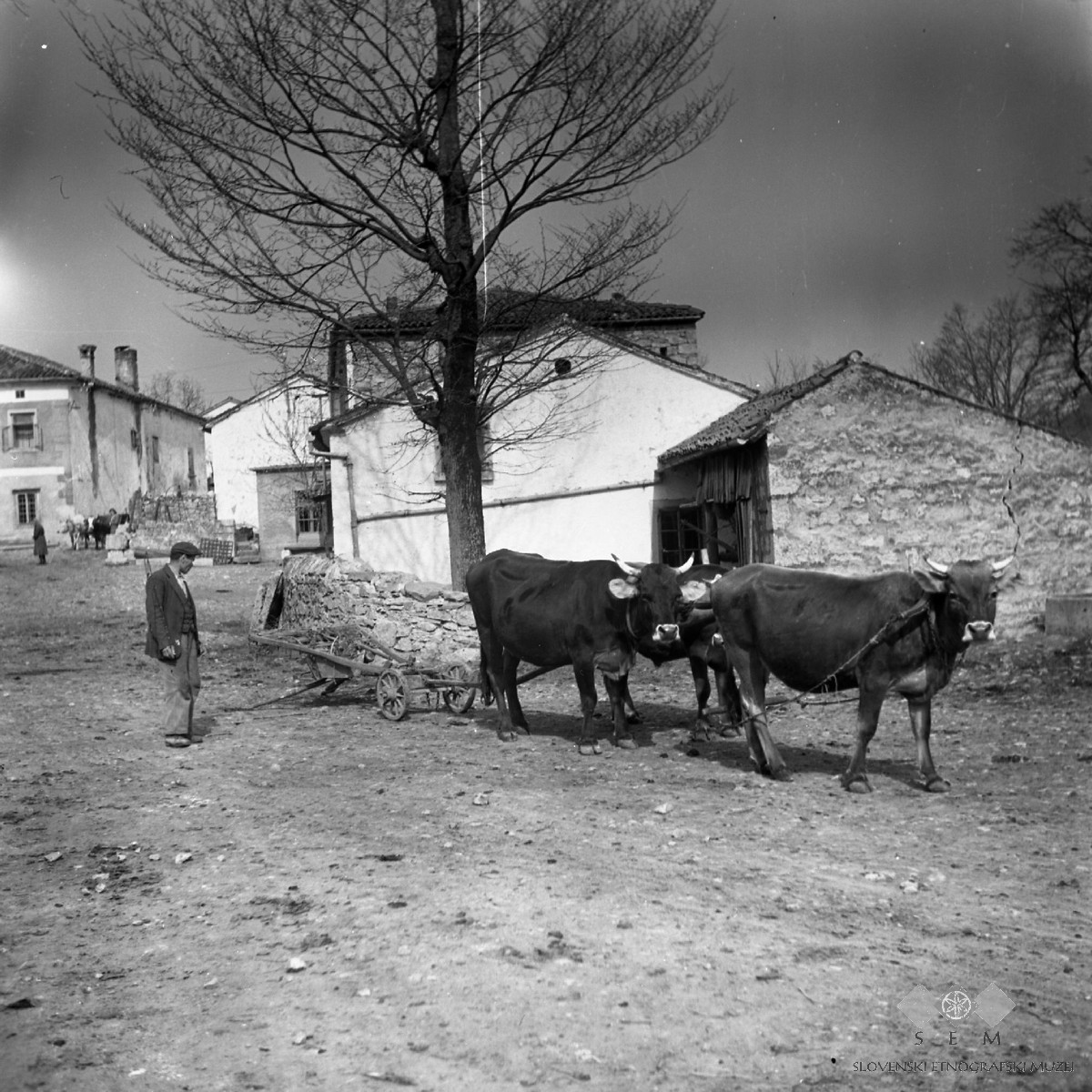
Hrušica in 1955
