= Municipality of Ilirska Bistrica =

Municipality of Slovenia

Municipality of Ilirska Bistrica Občina Ilirska Bistrica
- Municipality
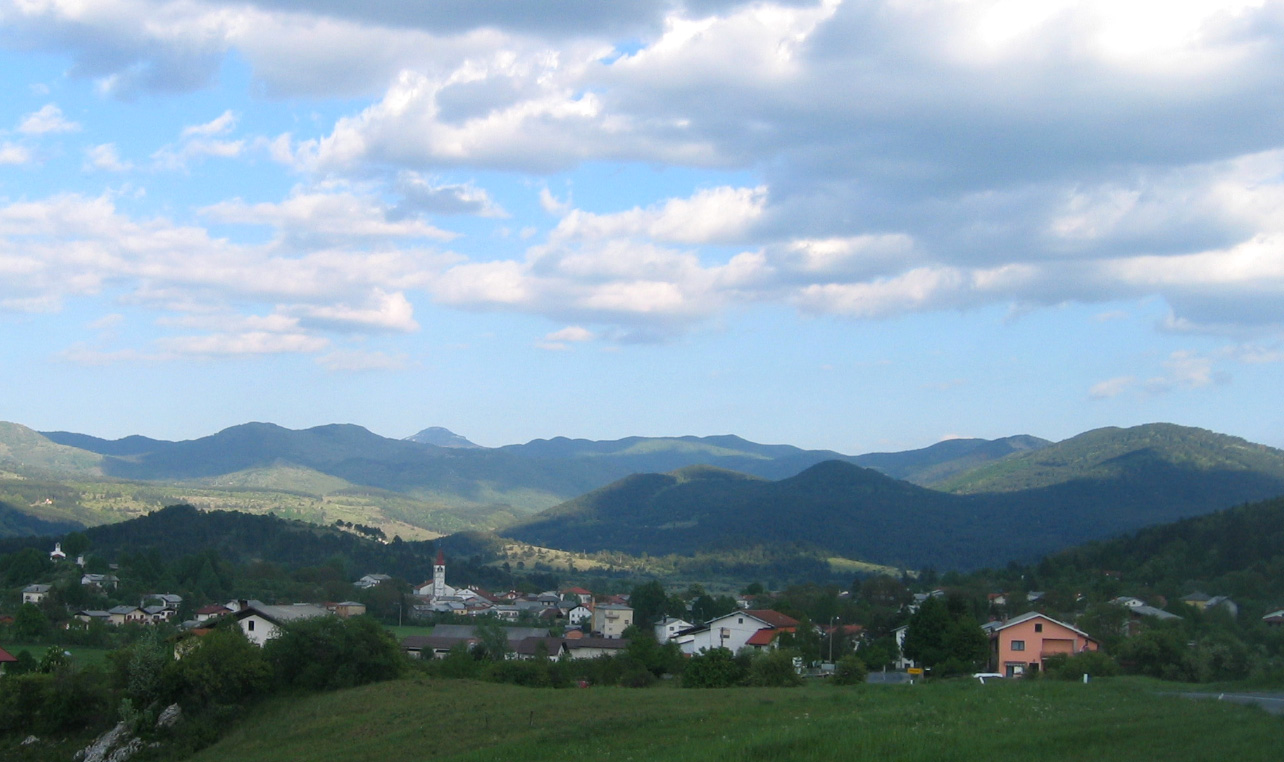
- Landscape in the Municipality of Ilirska Bistrica

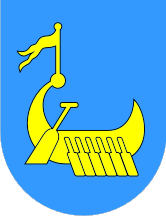
- Coat of arms

- Location of the Municipality of Ilirska Bistrica in Slovenia
- Coordinates: 45°34′N 14°14′E
- Country: Slovenia

Government
  - Mayor: Gregor Kovačič (Independent)

Area
  - Total: 480.0 km^{2} (185.3 sq mi)

Population (2021)
  - Total: 13,354
  - Density: 27.82/km^{2} (72.06/sq mi)
- Time zone: UTC+01 (CET)
  - Summer (DST): UTC+02 (CEST)
- Website: www.ilirska-bistrica.si

The Municipality of Ilirska Bistrica (pronounced [iˈliːɾska ˈbiːstɾitsa]; Slovene: Občina Ilirska Bistrica) is a municipality in Slovenia. It belongs to the traditional region of Inner Carniola. The seat of the municipality is the town of Ilirska Bistrica.

The current municipality was established on 3 October 1994 from the former Municipality of Ilirska Bistrica without territorial changes. It borders Croatia.

== Settlements ==
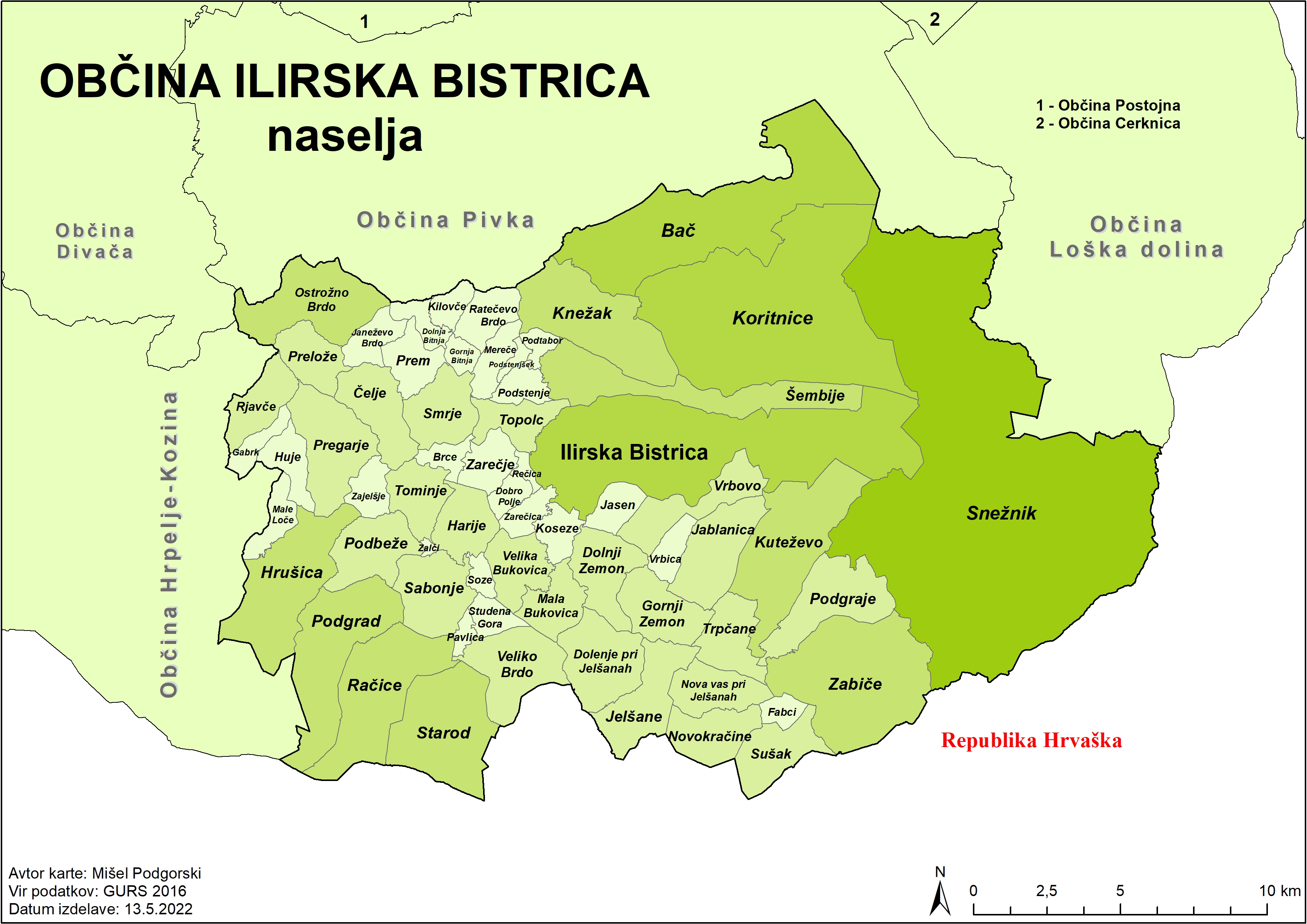
Villages of municipality

In addition to the municipal seat of Ilirska Bistrica, the municipality also includes the following settlements:

- Bač
- Brce
- Čelje
- Dobro Polje
- Dolenje pri Jelšanah
- Dolnja Bitnja
- Dolnji Zemon
- Fabci
- Gabrk
- Gornja Bitnja
- Gornji Zemon
- Harije
- Hrušica
- Huje
- Jablanica
- Janeževo Brdo
- Jasen
- Jelšane
- Kilovče
- Knežak
- Koritnice
- Koseze
- Kuteževo
- Mala Bukovica
- Male Loče
- Mereče
- Nova Vas pri Jelšanah
- Novokračine
- Ostrožno Brdo
- Pavlica
- Podbeže
- Podgrad
- Podgraje
- Podstenje
- Podstenjšek
- Podtabor
- Pregarje
- Prelože
- Prem
- Račice
- Ratečevo Brdo
- Rečica
- Rjavče
- Sabonje
- Smrje
- Snežnik
- Soze
- Starod
- Studena Gora
- Sušak
- Šembije
- Tominje
- Topolc
- Trpčane
- Velika Bukovica
- Veliko Brdo
- Vrbica
- Vrbovo
- Zabiče
- Zajelšje
- Zarečica
- Zarečje
