= Podgraje =

- Location in Slovenia
- Coordinates: 45°31′29.38″N 14°20′42.17″E
- Country: Slovenia
- Traditional region: Inner Carniola
- Statistical region: Littoral–Inner Carniola
- Municipality: Ilirska Bistrica

Area
  - Total: 7.66 km^{2} (2.96 sq mi)
- Elevation: 463 m (1,519 ft)

Population (2002)
  - Total: 270

Podgraje (pronounced [pɔdˈɡɾaːjɛ]; Italian: Villa Podigraie) is a village southeast of Ilirska Bistrica in the Inner Carniola region of Slovenia, towards the border with Croatia.

The parish church in the settlement is dedicated to Our Lady of Mount Carmel and belongs to the Koper Diocese.
