= Knežak =

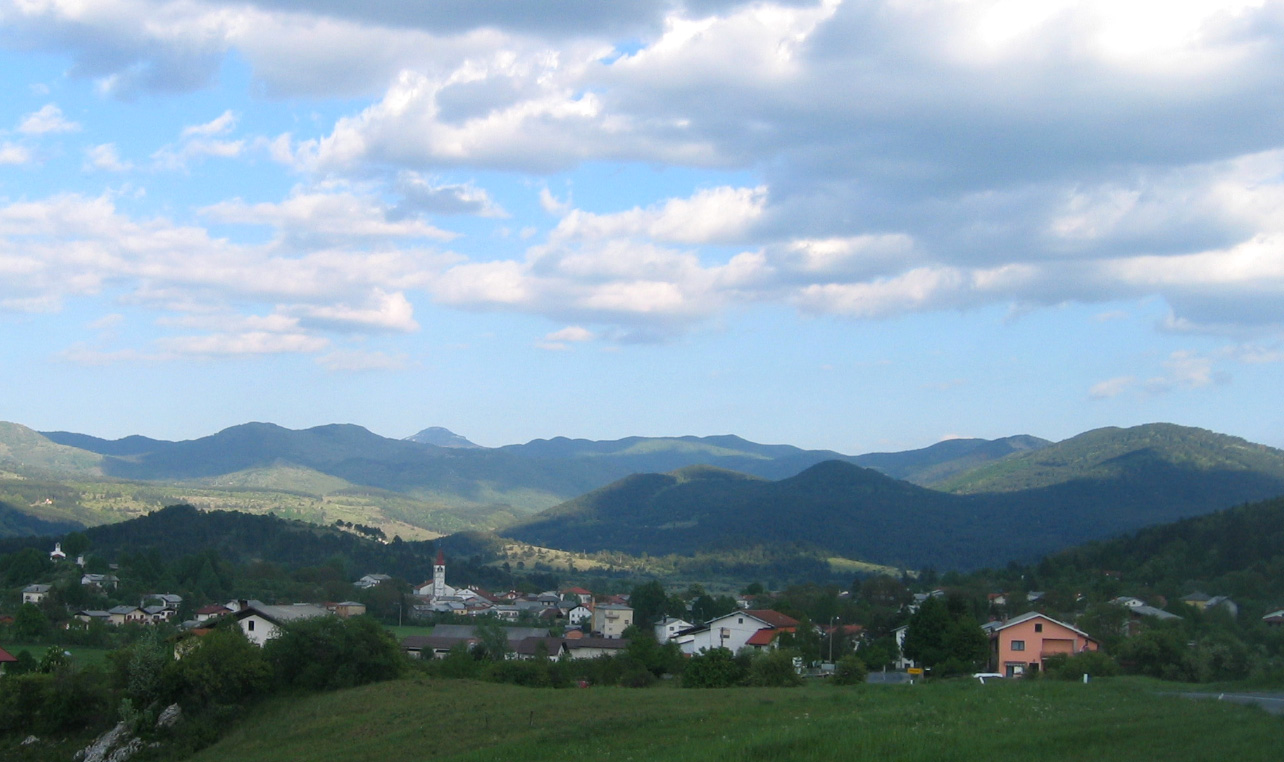

- Location in Slovenia
- Coordinates: 45°37′33.41″N 14°14′20.75″E
- Country: Slovenia
- Traditional region: Inner Carniola
- Statistical region: Littoral–Inner Carniola
- Municipality: Ilirska Bistrica

Area
  - Total: 11.99 km^{2} (4.63 sq mi)
- Elevation: 581.1 m (1,906 ft)

Population (2002)
  - Total: 477

Knežak (pronounced [knɛˈʒaːk]; German: Grafenbrunn, Italian: Fontana del Conte) is a village on the main road from Postojna to Ilirska Bistrica in the Inner Carniola region of Slovenia. It belongs to the Municipality of Ilirska Bistrica.

The parish church in the settlement is dedicated to the Assumption of Mary and belongs to the Koper Diocese.

The poet, composer, and playwright Miroslav Vilhar (1818–1871) is buried in Knežak.

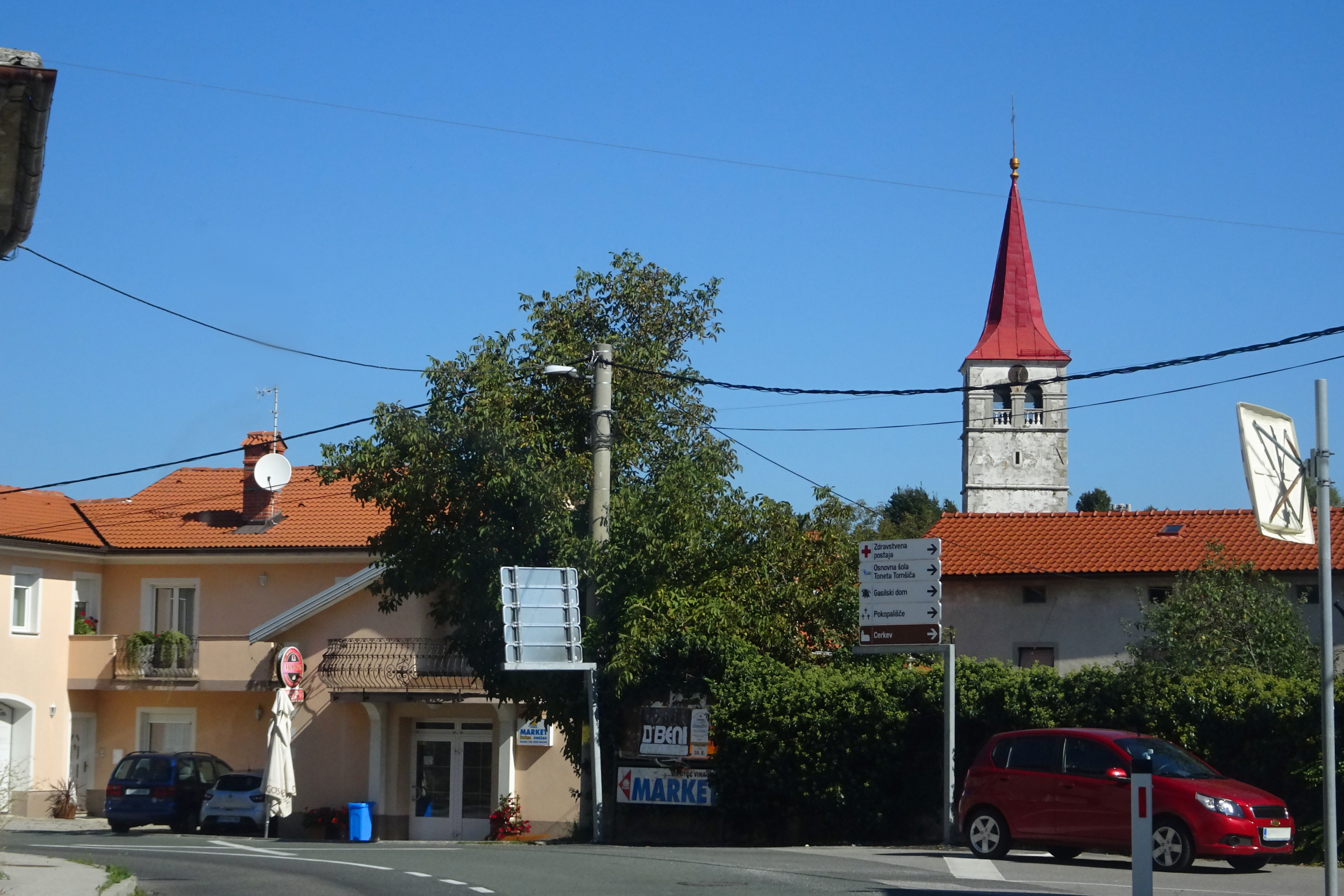
Knezak town center
