= Pregarje =

- Village
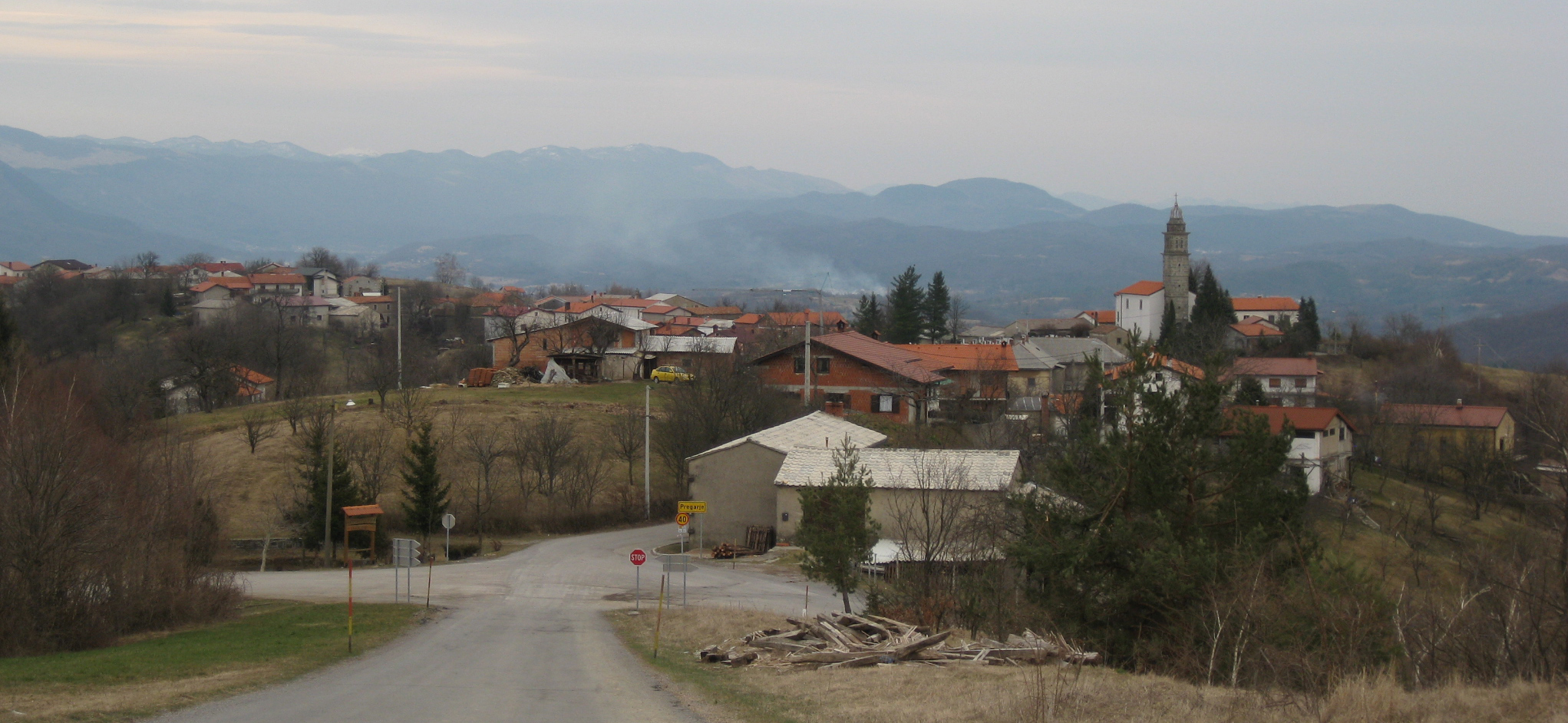

- Location in Slovenia
- Coordinates: 45°34′43.01″N 14°8′14.47″E
- Country: Slovenia
- Traditional region: Inner Carniola
- Statistical region: Littoral–Inner Carniola
- Municipality: Ilirska Bistrica

Area
  - Total: 7.87 km^{2} (3.04 sq mi)
- Elevation: 707.8 m (2,322 ft)

Population (2002)
  - Total: 216

Pregarje (pronounced [pɾɛˈɡaːrjɛ]; Italian: Pregara) is a village west of Ilirska Bistrica in the Inner Carniola region of Slovenia. It is the centre of the Brkini Hills region.

The parish church in the settlement is dedicated to Saint Lawrence and belongs to the Koper Diocese.
