= Harije =

- Location in Slovenia
- Coordinates: 45°33′14.58″N 14°11′59.45″E
- Country: Slovenia
- Traditional region: Inner Carniola
- Statistical region: Littoral–Inner Carniola
- Municipality: Ilirska Bistrica

Area
  - Total: 4.21 km^{2} (1.63 sq mi)
- Elevation: 515.2 m (1,690 ft)

Population (2002)
  - Total: 288

Harije (pronounced [xaˈɾiːjɛ]; Italian: Carie) is a village in the hills west of Ilirska Bistrica in the Inner Carniola region of Slovenia.

== Geography ==
Harije is an elongated village on a hill ridge in the southeast part of the Brkini region along the road from Ilirska Bistrica to Podgrad. It lies at a watershed; springs flow to the south into Klivnik Creek and to the north into Posrtev Creek. Grmada Hill (516 m) stands east of the village and Ded Hill (576 m) to the west. Most of the cultivated land lies to the west and east, separated by meadows and pastures.

== History ==
During the Second World War there was a Partisan checkpoint in the village. The Partisans operated a kitchen and had several bunkers in the village.

=== Mass graves ===
Harije is the site of four unmarked mass graves from the end of the Second World War. They all contain the remains of German soldiers from the 97th Corps that fell at the beginning of May 1945. The Cemetery Mass Grave (Slovene: Grobišče ob pokopališču) is located outside the north cemetery wall in the village. It contains the remains of four soldiers. The Vidos Oaks Mass Grave (Grobišče Vidosovi ceri), also known as the Mlake Lake Mass Grave (Grobišče pri jezeru v Mlakah), is located on the edge of the woods about 650 meters (2,130 ft) south of the village center and 40 m (131 ft) southeast of the main road. It contains the remains of four soldiers. The Laze Mass Grave (Grobišče Laze) lies next to the road, about 700 meters (2,300 ft) northeast of the village. It contains the remains of two or three soldiers. The Spring Creek Grave (Grobišče Studenčin potok), also known as the Studenčino Grave (Grobišče Studenčino), is located about 550 meters (1,800 ft) southwest of the main crossroads in the village. It contains the remains of one soldier.

== Church ==
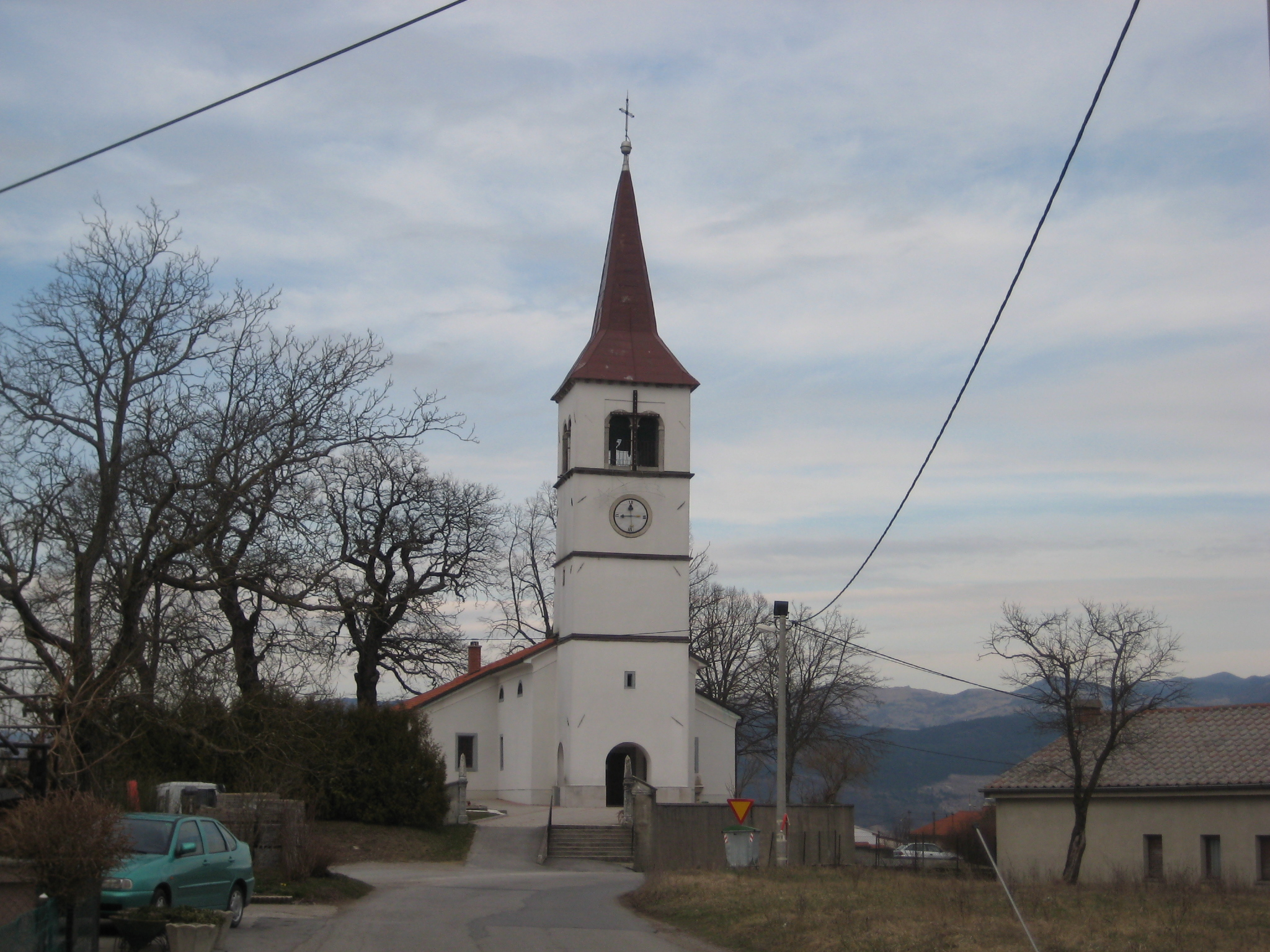
St. Stephen's Church

The parish church in the settlement is dedicated to Saint Stephen and belongs to the Koper Diocese.

== Notable people ==
Notable people that were born or lived in Harije include:

- Franc Bilc (1786–1824), lexicographer
- Alojz Mihelčič (1880–1975), musician
