= Mass graves in Ljubljana =

Coordinates: 46°03′20″N 14°30′30″E

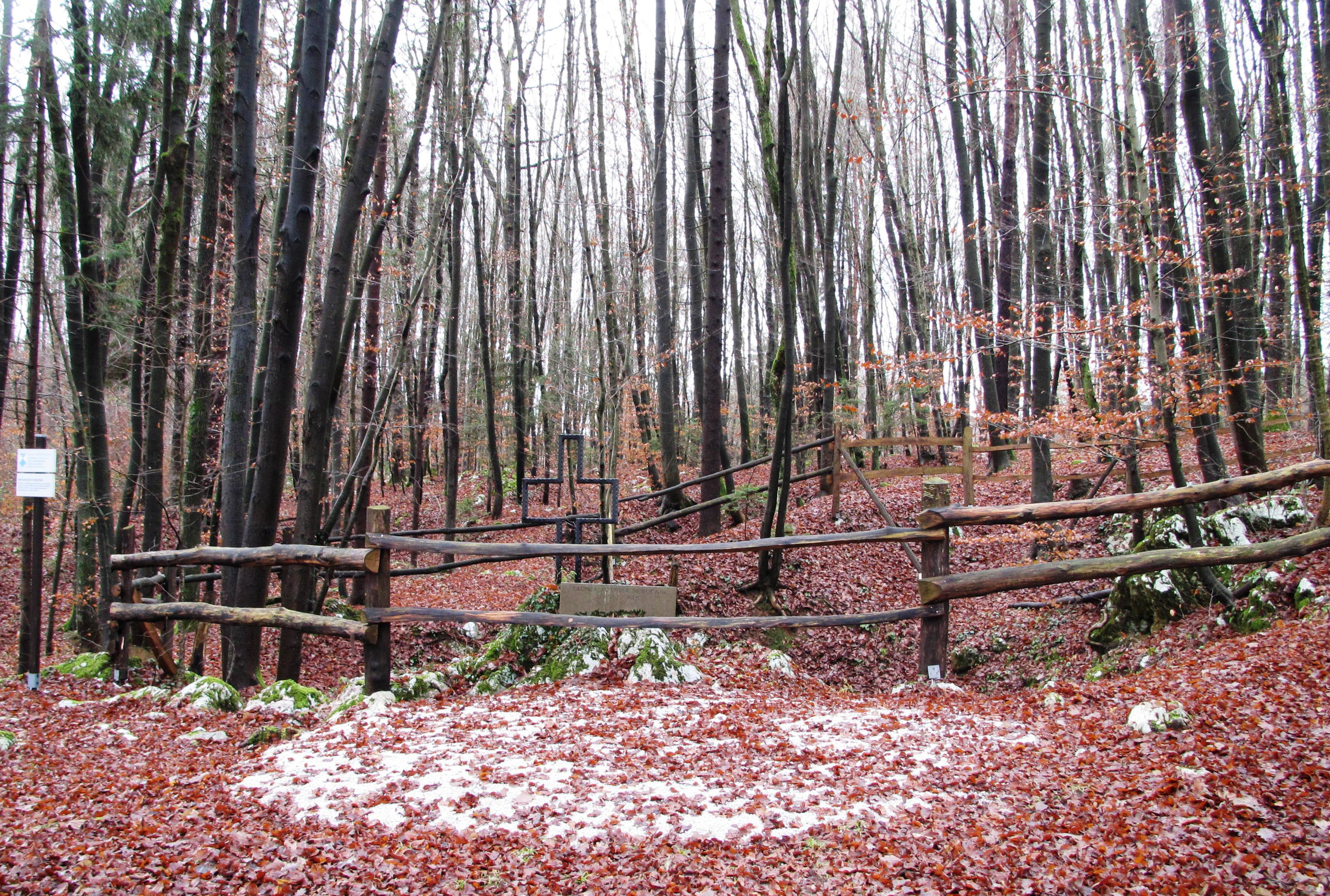
Memorial at the Big Brezar Shaft, a mass grave in Ljubljana

Mass graves in Ljubljana were created in Ljubljana, Slovenia during and after the Second World War. The Commission on Concealed Mass Graves in Slovenia has registered five known mass graves in the city itself and an additional 15 in the City Municipality of Ljubljana.

== Background ==
Except for the Orel Peak Mass Grave, which is a former wartime Home Guard cemetery, all of the concealed mass graves in Ljubljana were created in the immediate aftermath of the Second World War, after British forces repatriated Home Guard soldiers that had fled to Austria to Yugoslavia from camps in Bleiburg, Lavamund, Rosenbach, Viktring (a district of Klagenfurt), and elsewhere. Many of the returnees were held at the St. Stanislaus Institute in the former village of Šentvid, just outside Ljubljana, which was used as a prison by the Partisans. Some died in Šentvid, but most were transported elsewhere and murdered.

== List of mass graves ==
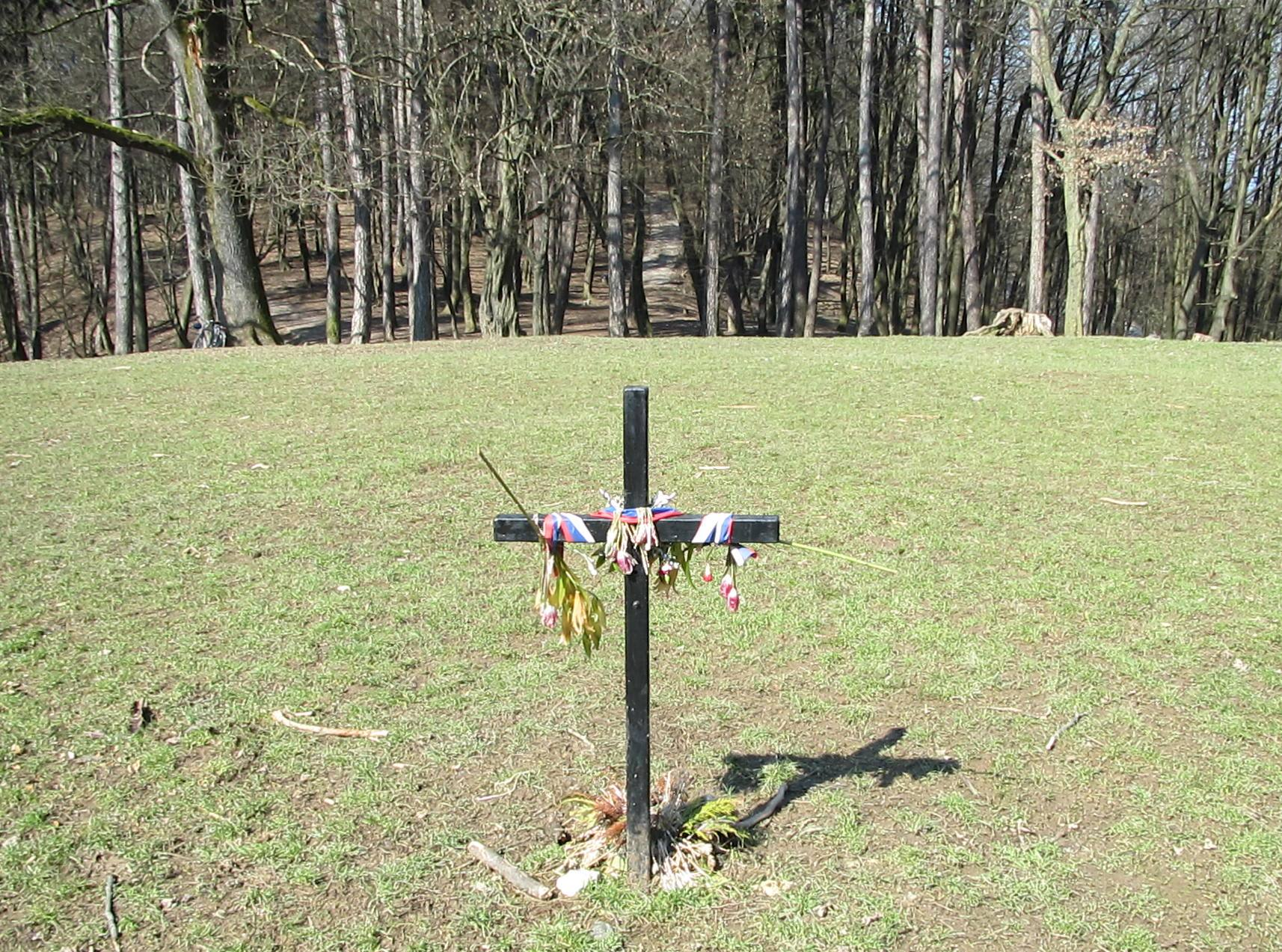
Cross in former Home Guard cemetery

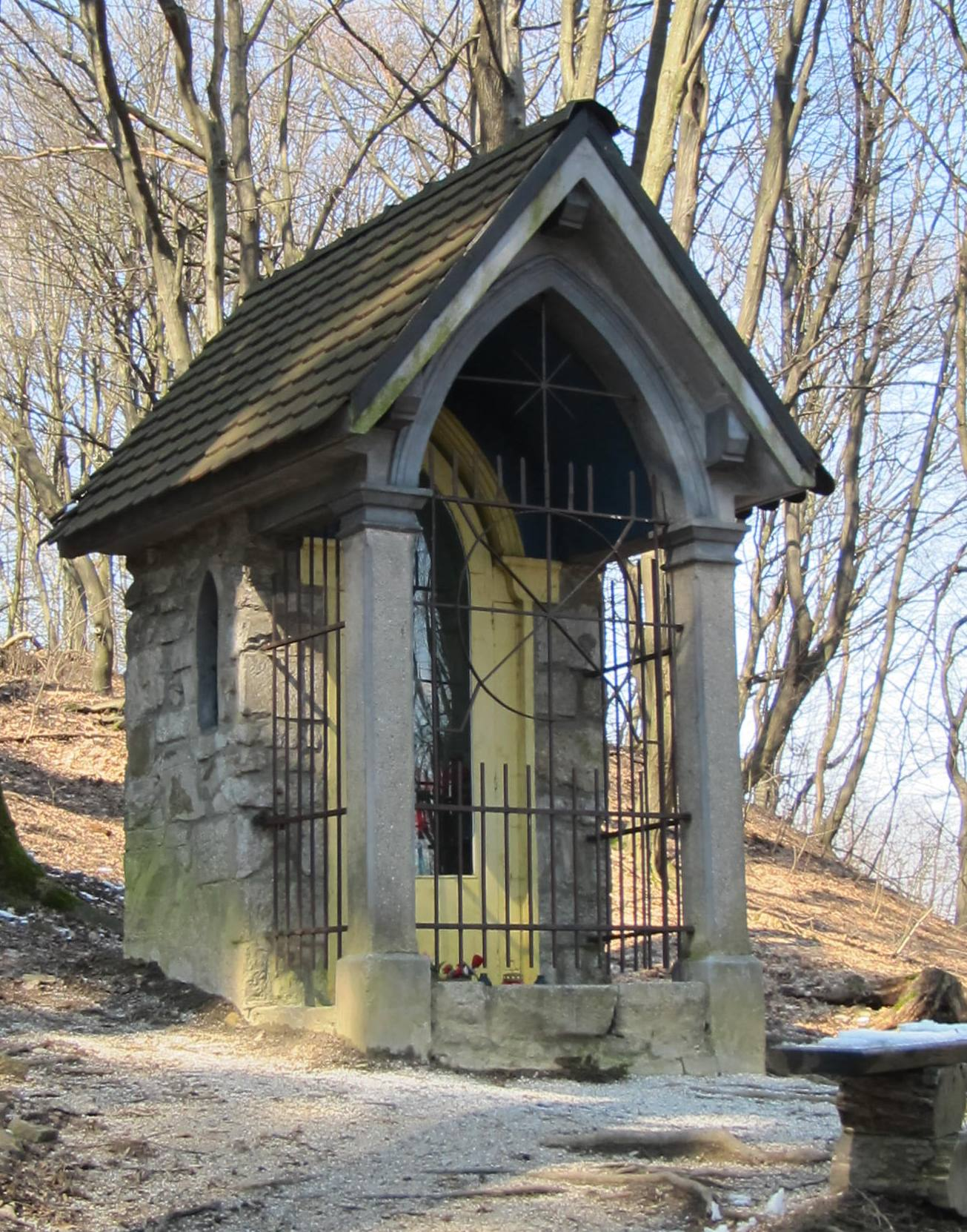
Chapel-shrine

Orel Peak Mass Grave

Five mass graves registered by the Commission on Concealed Mass Graves in Slovenia are located inside the city limits:

- The Orel Peak Mass Grave (Slovene: Grobišče Orlov vrh) is located at the southeast end of Castle Hill (Grajski grič) in central Ljubljana, about 580 meters (1,900 ft) from Ljubljana Castle. It is the site of a former military cemetery for 146 Home Guard soldiers that could not be buried in their home cemeteries due to circumstances during the war. Burials took place at the site from December 1943 until the end of April 1945, and a large-scale commemoration was held at the cemetery on All Saint's Day in 1944. After the war, the cemetery was destroyed and most of the remains were removed to an unknown location. Memorial crosses erected at the site since 1991 have repeatedly been vandalized. There is a chapel-shrine near the site, dating from before the First World War, where an annual memorial service is held.
- The Big Brezar Shaft Mass Grave (Grobišče Veliko Brezarjevo brezno) is located in the Kucja Valley (Kucja dolina) on the northwest outskirts of the city. It contained the remains of a mix of Slovenian and Croatian prisoners of war from the St. Stanislaus Institute in nearby Šentvid and civilians, including women.
- The Kucja Valley Mass Grave (Grobišče v Kucji dolini) lies below the Big Brezar Shaft Mass Grave. After seepage from the Big Brezar Shaft poisoned the groundwater in the area, German prisoners of war were forced to remove the bodies from the shaft on 12 and 13 June 1945 and bury them in the nearby mass grave at the head of the Kucja Valley. After this, the German prisoners were also executed and buried together with the bodies they had moved.

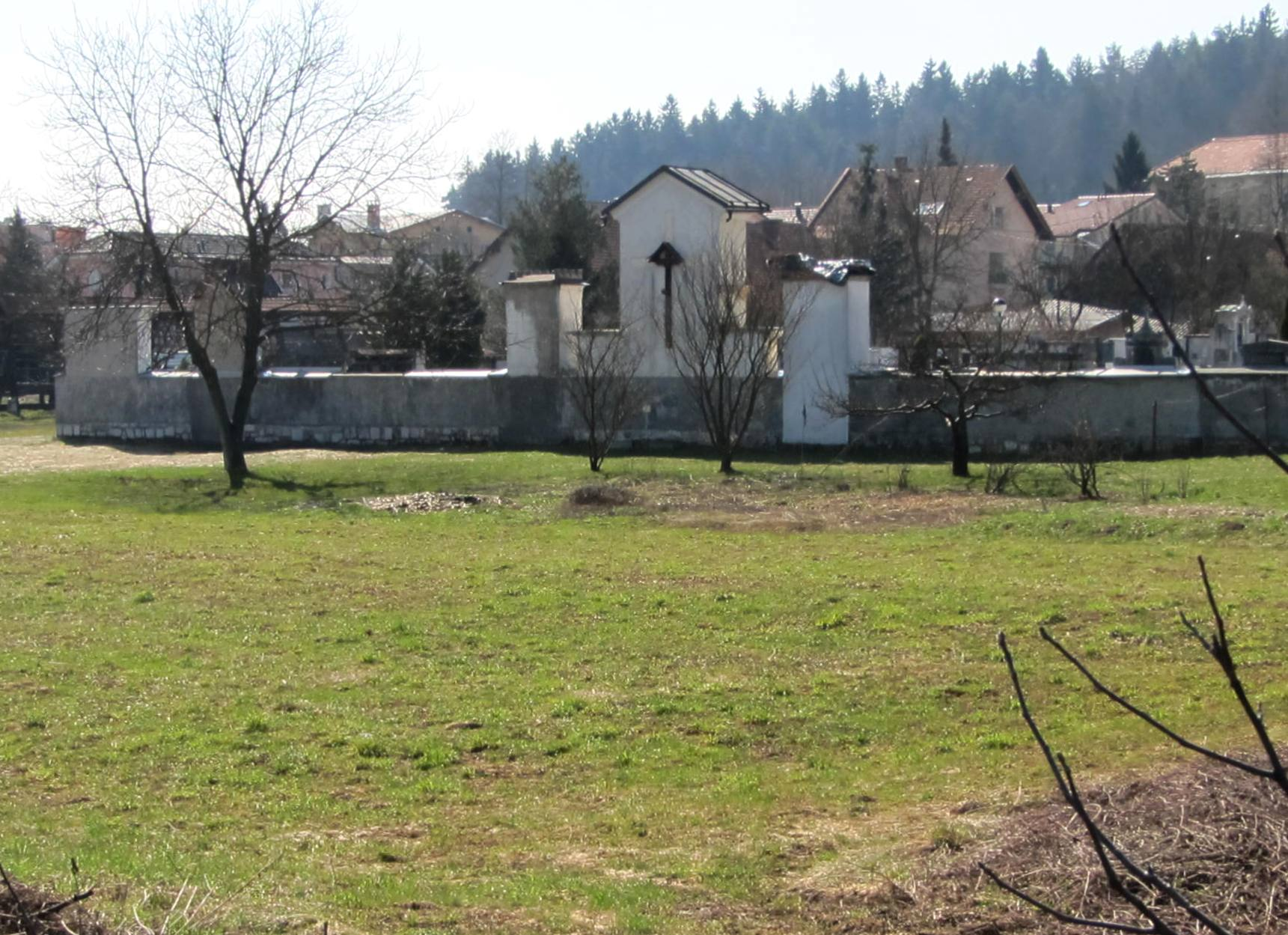
Grave site behind cemetery

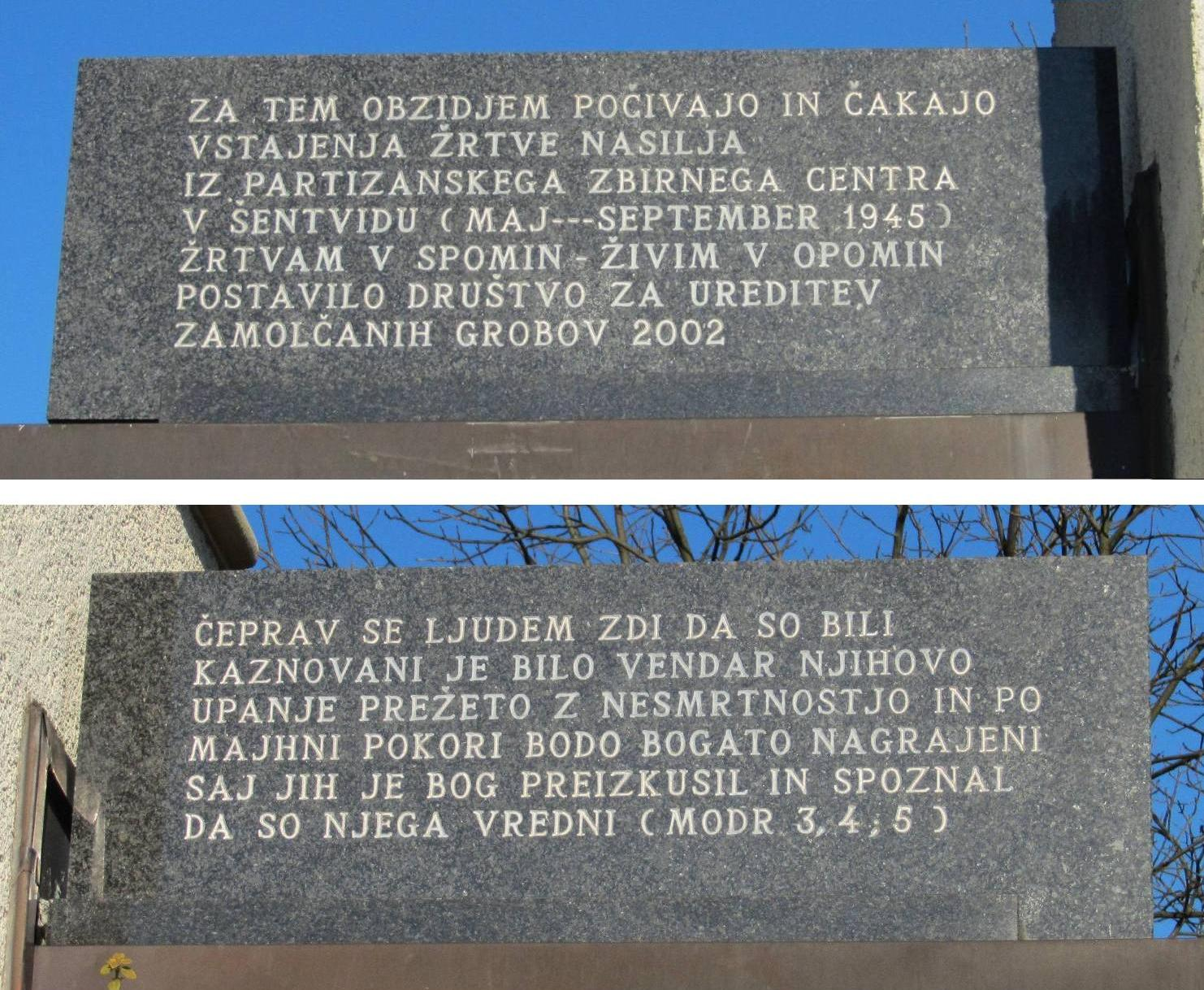
Plaques formerly on cemetery wall

Šentvid Mass Graves
- The Šentvid 1 Mass Grave (Grobišče Šentvid 1) is located a few meters outside the cemetery wall in the Šentvid District, in the northwest part of the city, near the spot where a large oak tree fell during a storm in 1986. It contains the remains of Home Guard prisoners of war that were returned to Yugoslavia by British forces from prisoner of war camps in Austria but died before they could be transported to the Kočevje area, where most of them were murdered.
- The Šentvid 2 Mass Grave (Grobišče Šentvid 2) is located a few meters from the first grave and contains the remains of German prisoners of war and wounded prisoners.

The Society for the Regulation of Concealed Graves (Slovene: Društvo za ureditev zamolčanih grobišč) installed a pair of plaques on the Šentvid cemetery wall facing the graves in 2002. They read: "The victims of violence from the Partisan collection center in Šentvid (May–September 1945) lie and await the resurrection behind this wall. In memory of the victims, a warning to the living," and quote the Book of Wisdom (3:4–5): "For though they be punished in the sight of men, yet is their hope full of immortality. And having been a little chastised, they shall be greatly rewarded: for God proved them, and found them worthy for himself."

Other victims from the prison in Šentvid were killed outside Ljubljana, in Glažuta, Golo, Onek, and Setnica.

An additional mass grave in the city is likely located in Dobrunje, but has not been registered by the commission. The memorial site at Saint Ulrich’s Church is believed to contain the remains of people liquidated by the Partisans during or after the war, including the "Šentpavel victims" (šentpavelske žrtve)—eight men abducted by Yugoslav military police (KNOJ) from the village of Šentpavel on 4 July 1945 and murdered.

== Other mass graves ==
Fifteen additional mass graves are located in the City Municipality of Ljubljana outside the Ljubljana city limits. There are four graves in Pance and 11 graves in Selo pri Pancah.
