= Toško Čelo =

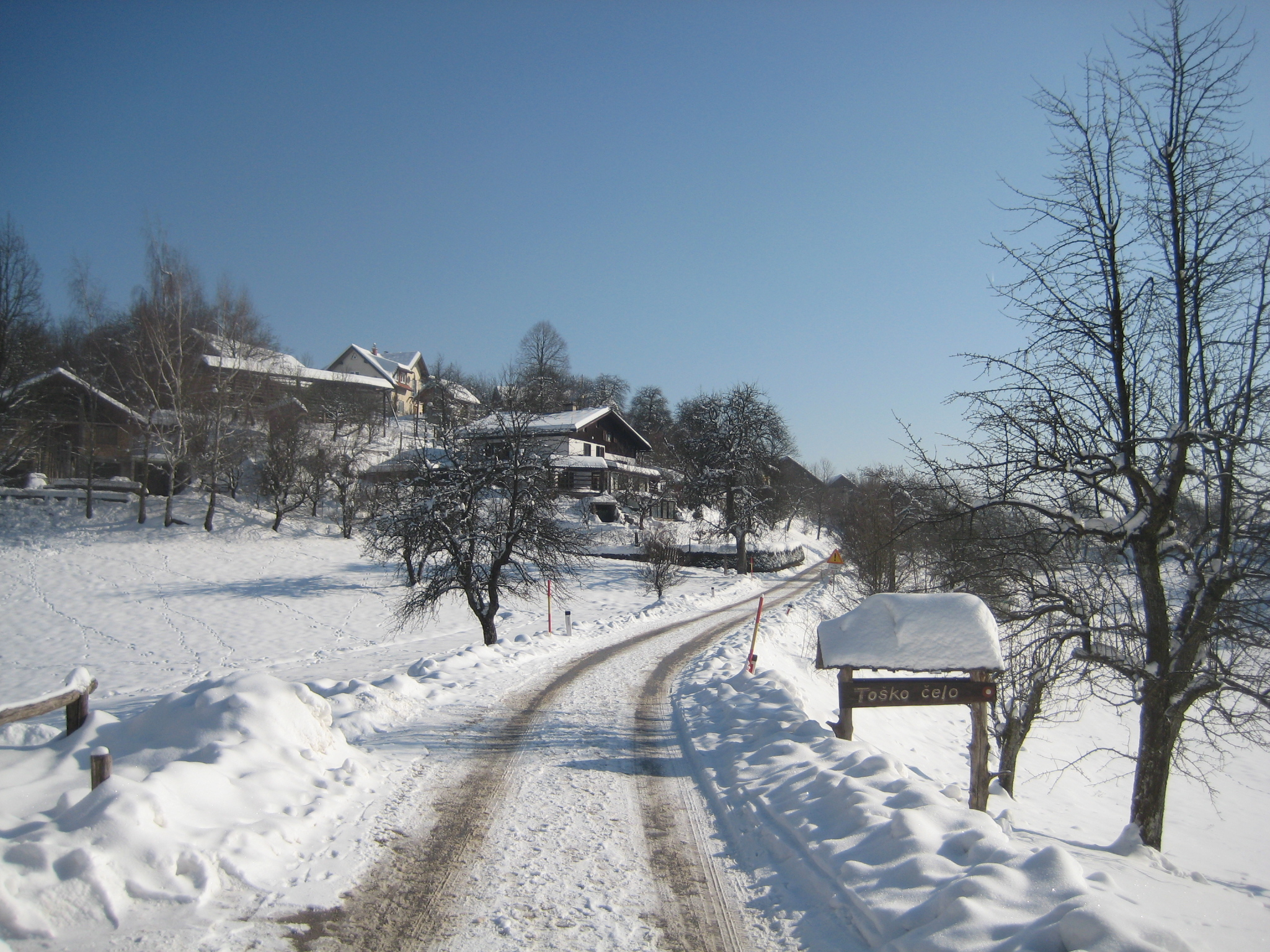
- Toško Čelo viewed from the west

- Location in Slovenia
- Coordinates: 46°5′0.15″N 14°25′6.69″E
- Country: Slovenia
- Traditional region: Upper Carniola
- Statistical region: Central Slovenia
- Municipality: Ljubljana

Area
  - Total: 1.39 km^{2} (0.54 sq mi)
- Elevation: 551.6 m (1,810 ft)

Population (2002)
  - Total: 22
- Postal code: 1000

Toško Čelo (pronounced [ˈtoːʃkɔ ˈtʃɛːlɔ]) is a dispersed settlement on the slope of the hill known as Tošč Face (Slovene: Toško čelo), part of the Polhov Gradec Hills, west of the capital Ljubljana in central Slovenia. The area is part of the traditional region of Upper Carniola and is now included with the rest of the municipality in the Central Slovenia Statistical Region. It belongs to the City Municipality of Ljubljana.

== Geography ==
The scattered village lies in the hills between the Sava Plain and the Gradaščica Valley. It is accessible by a paved road running along the ridge above the Kucja Valley; the road branches off from the main road between Šentvid and Dobrova and continues as an unpaved road to Topol pri Medvodah. The core of the village lies at the foot of Peštota Hill (590 meters or 1,940 feet); to the south is Vrh Peak (570 meters or 1,870 feet) and further to the north is Kucelj Hill (572 meters or 1,877 feet). The karst Ravnik Plateau lies west of the village. The soil is stony and there are fields on the nearby slopes. The pastures are named Za Breznom (literally, 'behind the shaft'), Breza ('birch'), and Rupce ('sinkholes'), a meadow area is named Laz (literally, 'clearing'), and the surrounding woods are named Perca, Riglji, and Mlakovž. There is also an abandoned pasture in the Mlakovž Woods. There are several shallow karst shafts on the Ravnik Plateau.

== Name ==
Toško Čelo was attested in written sources in 1376 as Vaystem ek (and as Vaistenekk in 1414, Vaistn hiern in 1453, and Na Verhu, Navrchu vel Turskczel, and Taustutschel in 1763–87). The modern name of the settlement literally means 'Tošč face': the noun čelo (otherwise 'forehead' in Slovene) refers to a vertical or steep rocky cliff face below a summit and the adjective toško is related to Mount Tošč (1021 m) to the west (originally based on a dialect form of the adjective tolst 'fat'). The original meaning 'fat' is also reflected in the medieval German names of the settlement, containing the Middle High German word veiz(e)t 'fat'.

== Second World War ==
During the Second World War a Partisan courier connection operated through Toško Čelo from November 1941 to March 1942, connecting Ljubljana and Upper Carniola. It was maintained by a three-member armed patrol; messages were collected at the checkpoint below Toško Čelo and then relayed to the checkpoint at Medno Hill (Slovene: Medenski hrib) on the German side of the border. Today a memorial to the Partisan couriers stands below the settlement. Italian forces burned the village to the ground on 19 March 1943. The village was entirely rebuilt after the war.

== Gallery ==
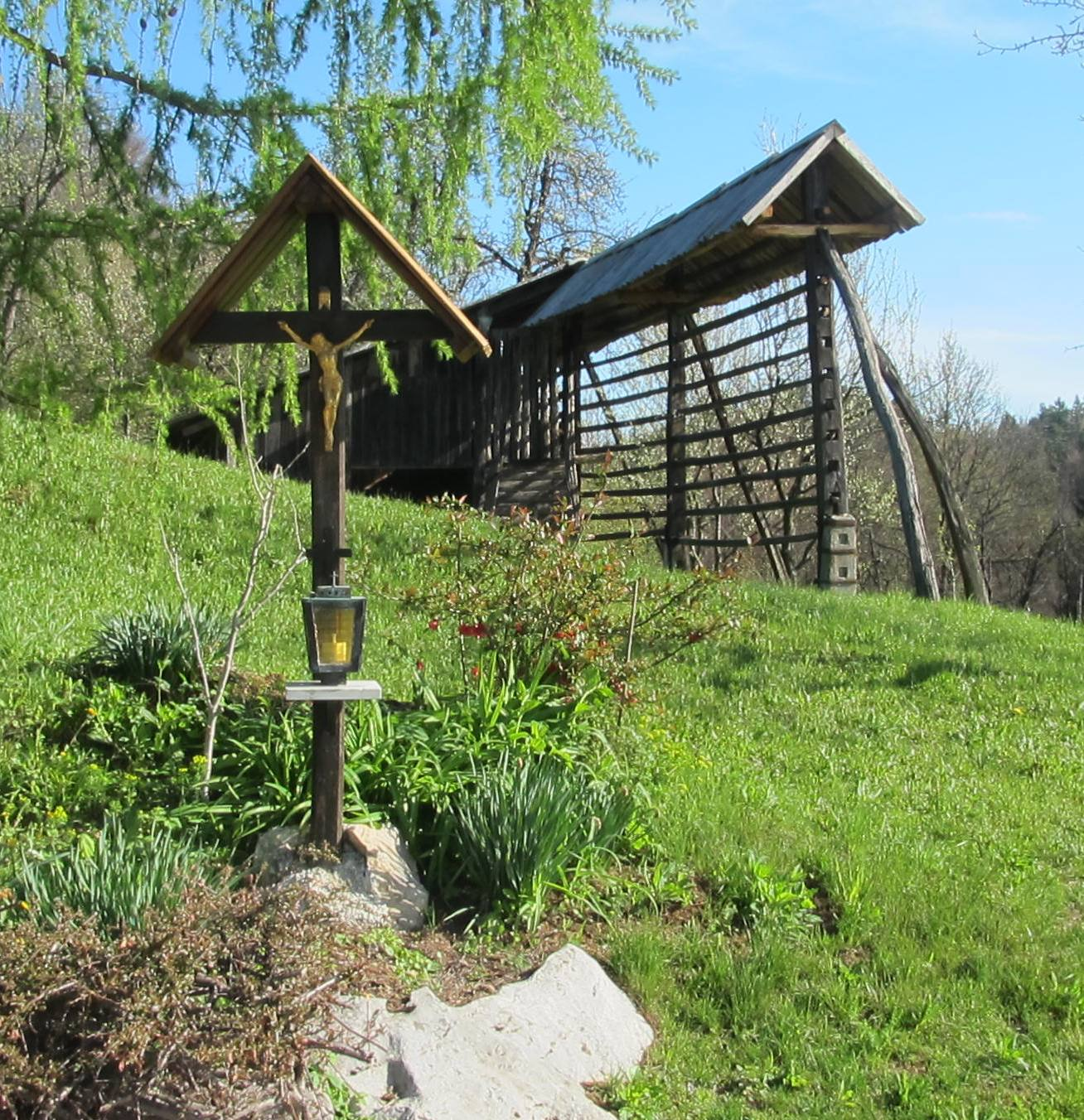
Wayside shrine and hayrack in Toško Čelo

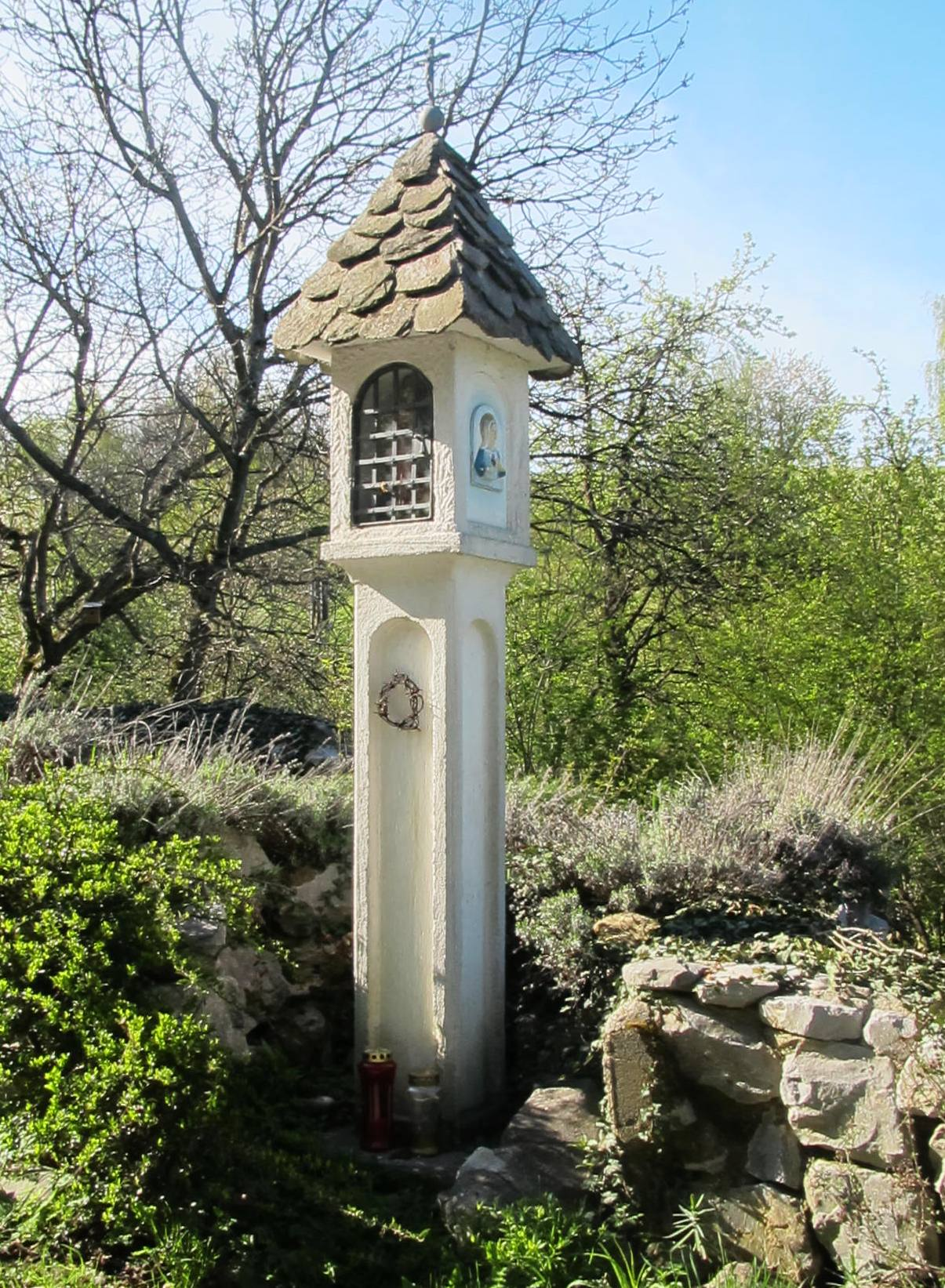
Wayside shrine in Toško Čelo
