= Tošč =

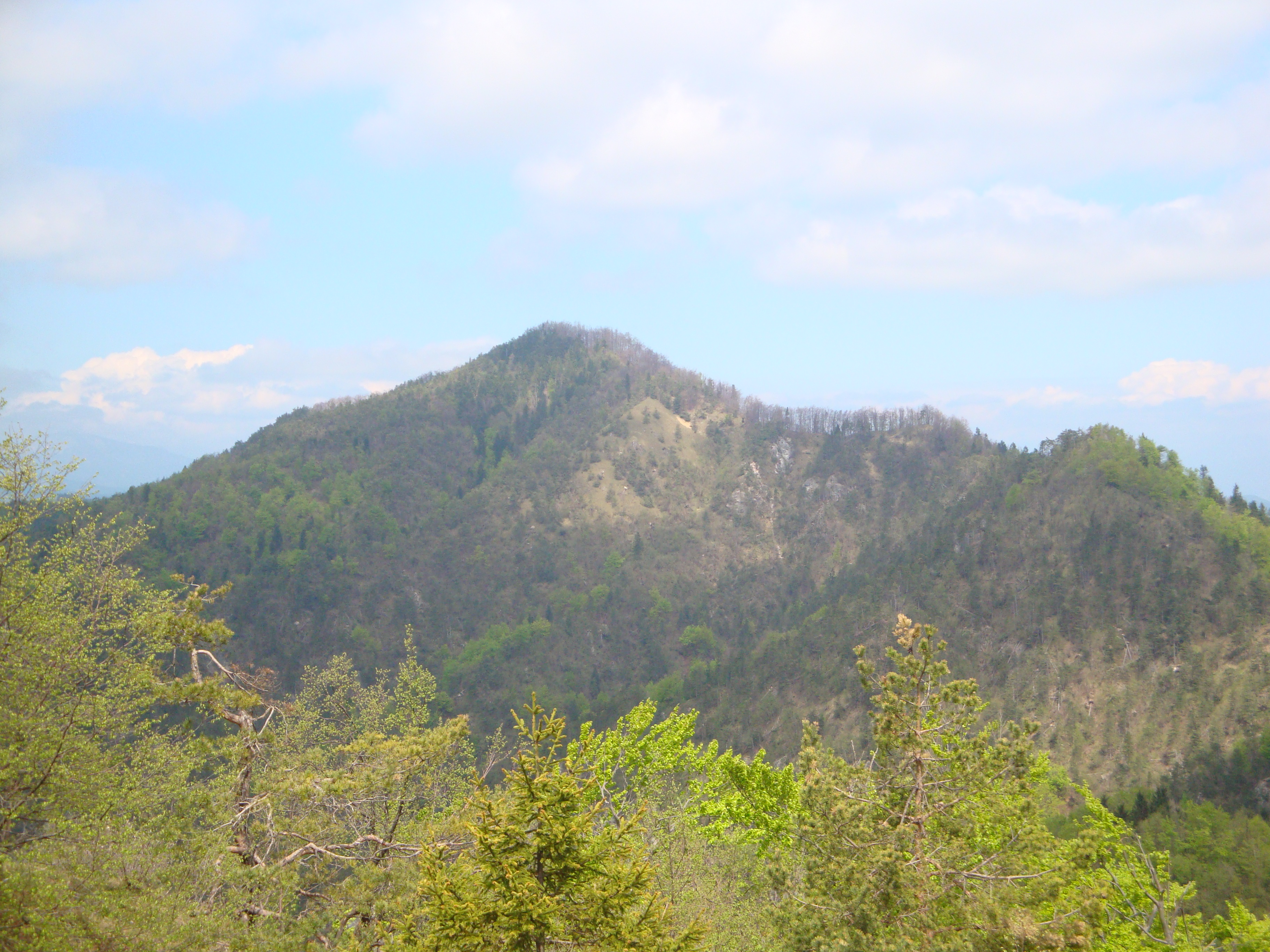

Highest point
- Elevation: 1,021 m (3,350 ft)
- Coordinates: 46°5′50″N 14°19′17″E

Geography
- Location within Slovenia
- Location: Slovenia
- Parent range: Polhov Gradec Hills

Tošč (1,021 metres or 3,350 feet) is the highest hill in the Polhov Gradec Hills. The neighbouring hill Pasja Ravan (1,020 m or 3,350 ft) used to be the highest before Yugoslav Army reduced its height by eight meters in the 1970s.

== Name ==
Like nearby Toško Čelo, the name Tošč is ultimately derived from the Slovene adjective tolst 'fat', referring to the mountain's wide base and gentle summit. No medieval attestations of the name are known, but it probably developed from a form such as *Tolstič 'the fat one'.

== Routes ==
- 1h from Selo
- 1h from Kmetija Gonte farm
- 2½h from Polhov Gradec over Grmada
- 2¼h from Topol over Grmada
- 2h from Topol
- 1¾h from Polhov Gradec through Mačkov Graben
- 1¼h from Rovtar Farm
- 1¾h from Mihelčič Lodge at Govejek
- 1½h from Trnovec
