= Golo, Ig =

Golo
- Village
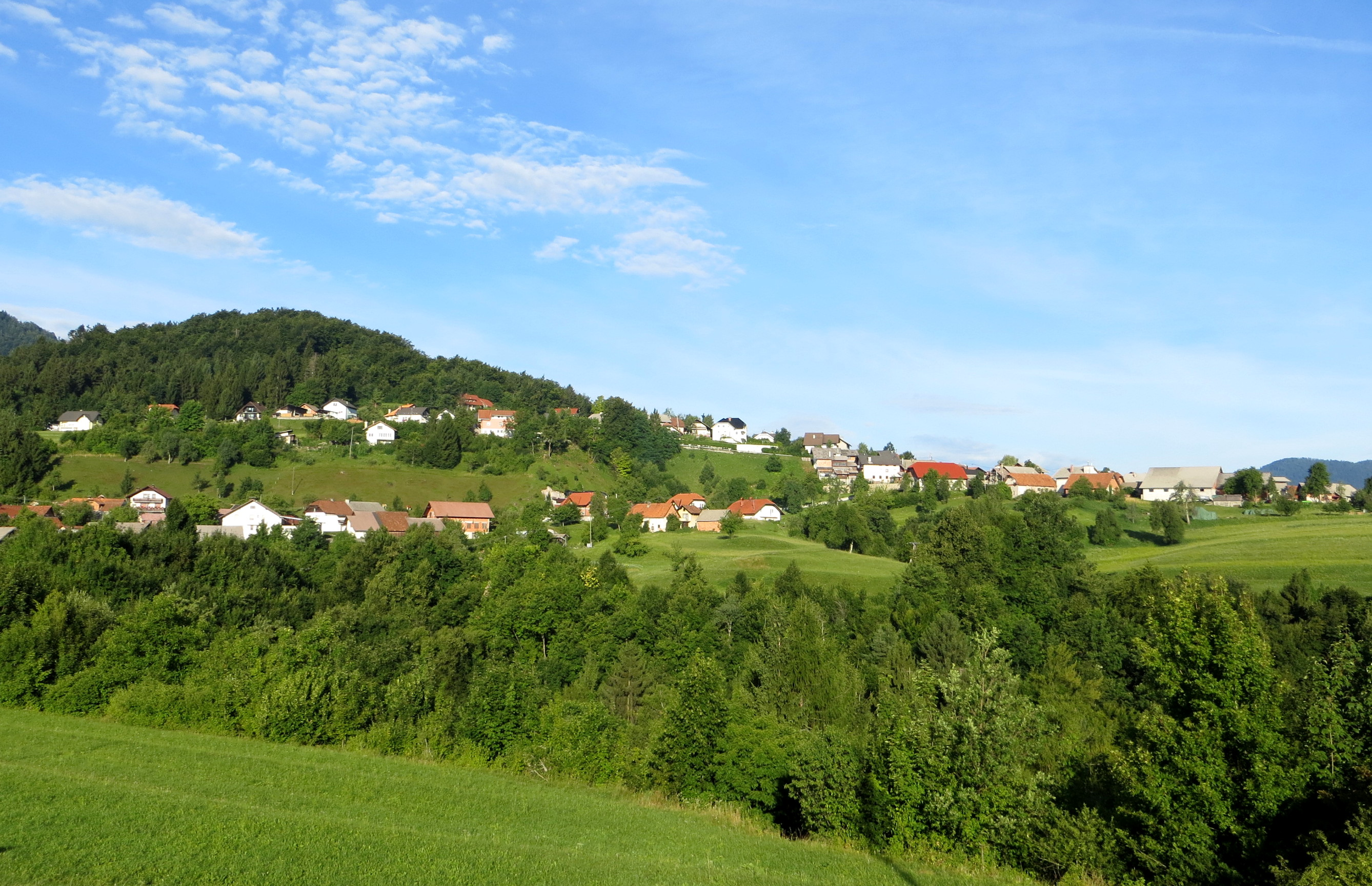

- Location in Slovenia
- Coordinates: 45°54′31.57″N 14°32′49.85″E
- Country: Slovenia
- Traditional region: Inner Carniola
- Statistical region: Central Slovenia
- Municipality: Ig

Area
  - Total: 11.93 km^{2} (4.61 sq mi)
- Elevation: 680.6 m (2,233 ft)

Population (2002)
  - Total: 334
- Postal code: 1292

Golo (pronounced [ˈɡɔːlɔ], German: Golu) is a village in the hills south of Ig in central Slovenia. The entire Municipality of Ig is part of the traditional region of Inner Carniola and is now included in the Central Slovenia Statistical Region.

== Geography ==
Golo is a clustered village with two settlement centers: the hamlets of Gorenje Golo (German: Obergolu) and Dolenje Golo (German: Untergolu). It lies along the road from Ig to Visoko northeast of Mount Mokrec (elevation: 1,059 meters or 3,474 feet). Golec Hill (elevation: 766 meters or 2,513 feet) rises to the southwest.

== History ==
Early settlement in Golo is attested by archaeological finds, including Hallstatt culture artifacts and a Roman-era fortification near the site of the church. A castle known as Nad Gačo stood above the rectory. A part-time school was established in Golo in 1874, and regular schooling was started in 1908. Until the school building was built in 1925, classes were held in the rectory. During the Second World War, Italian forces burned the village on March 19, 1942. Later the same year, on July 23, they killed 12 hostages at Gmajna below Golec Hill.

=== Mass grave ===
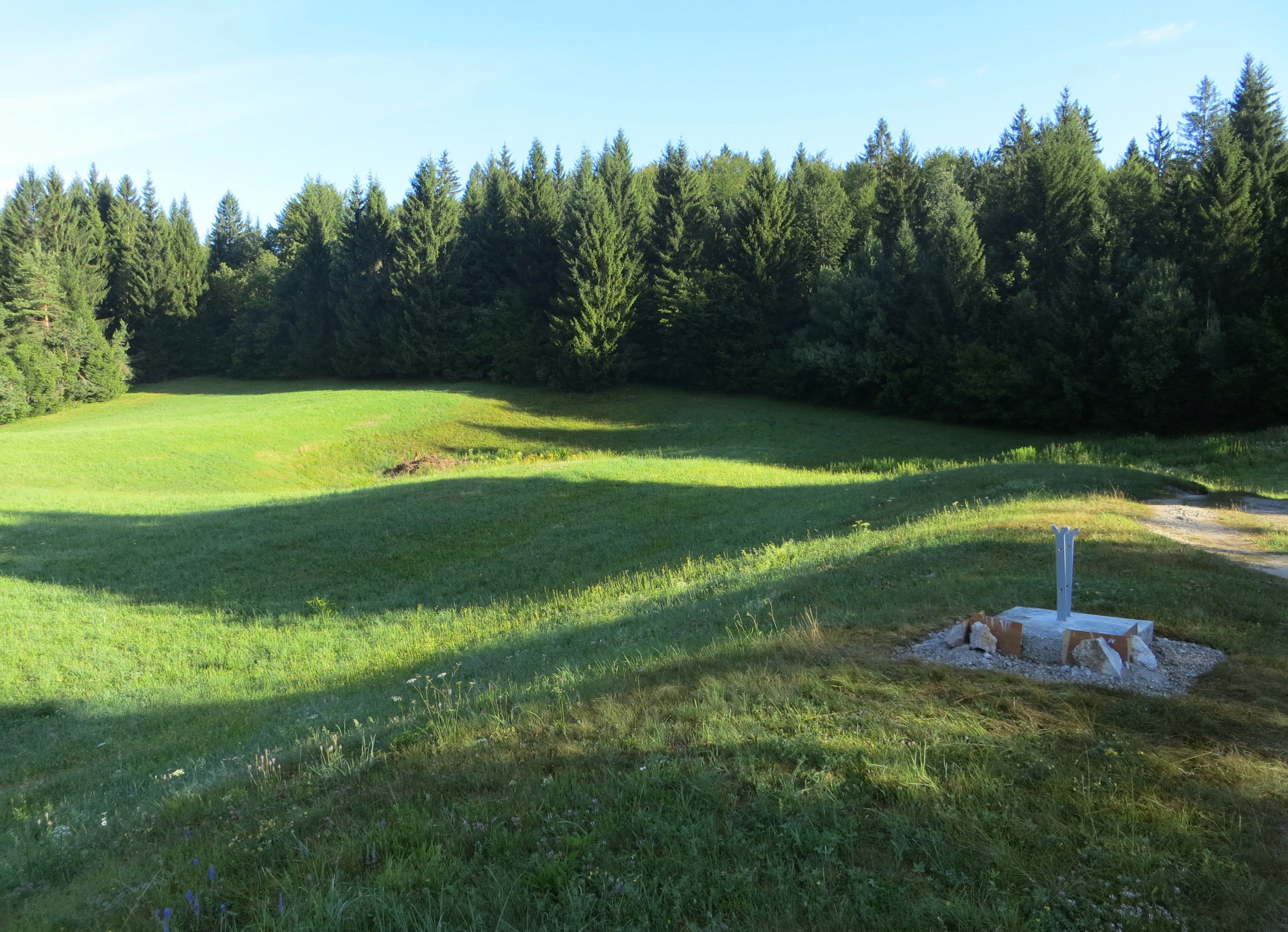
Golo Mass Grave site

Golo is the site of a mass grave from the period immediately after the Second World War. The Golo Mass Grave (Slovene: Grobišče Golo) is located in a sinkhole south of the settlement in the hamlet of Stara Žaga. It contains the remains of a large number of Home Guard prisoners of war that were transported by truck from the prison in Šentvid and murdered here on July 26, 1945.

=== Merger ===
Golo was established as a single settlement in 1952, when the formerly separate villages of Gorenje Golo and Dolenje Golo were merged to create Golo.

== Church ==
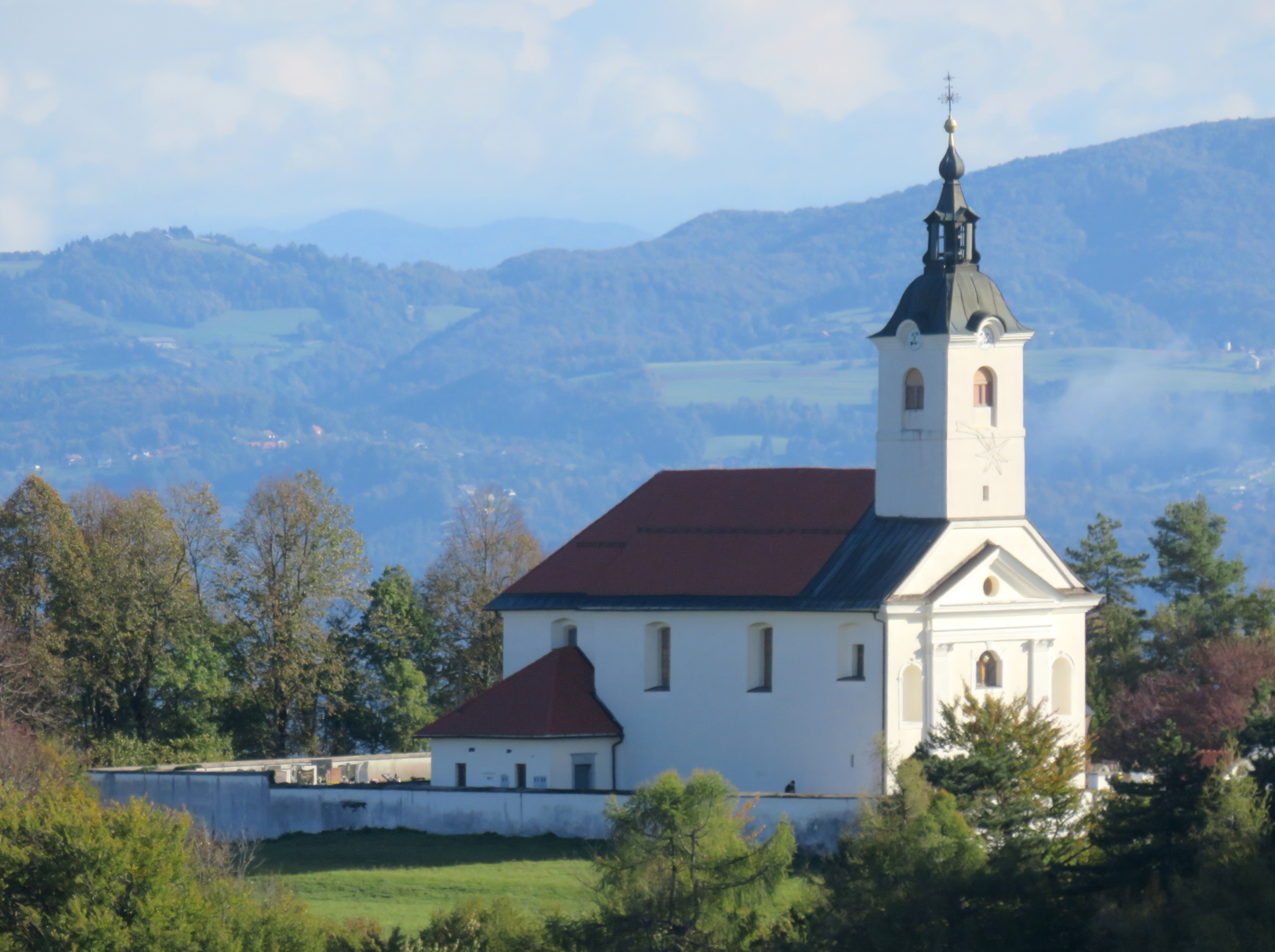
Saint Margaret's Church

The local parish church, built outside the settlement to the northeast, is dedicated to Saint Margaret (Slovene: sveta Marjeta) and belongs to the Roman Catholic Archdiocese of Ljubljana. It is a Baroque building, dating to the 18th century. A prehistoric Iron Age settlement has also been identified at the site around the church. The structure at the site was first mentioned in 1631; it was made a quasi-parish in 1787 and was elevated to a parish in 1877. The current church dates to the beginning of the 19th century. Its altar and pulpit date from the second half of the 18th century and were transferred to the church from the monastery church in Kostanjevica na Krki. The church was burned by Italian forces in March 1942 and was renovated after the war.

== Notable people ==
Notable people that were born or lived in Golo include:

- Lovro Mencinger (1835–1903), orchardist. He lived in Golo from 1866 to 1891 and was the first to describe the glory optical phenomenon there.
