= Mount Polhov Gradec =

Hill in Slovenia

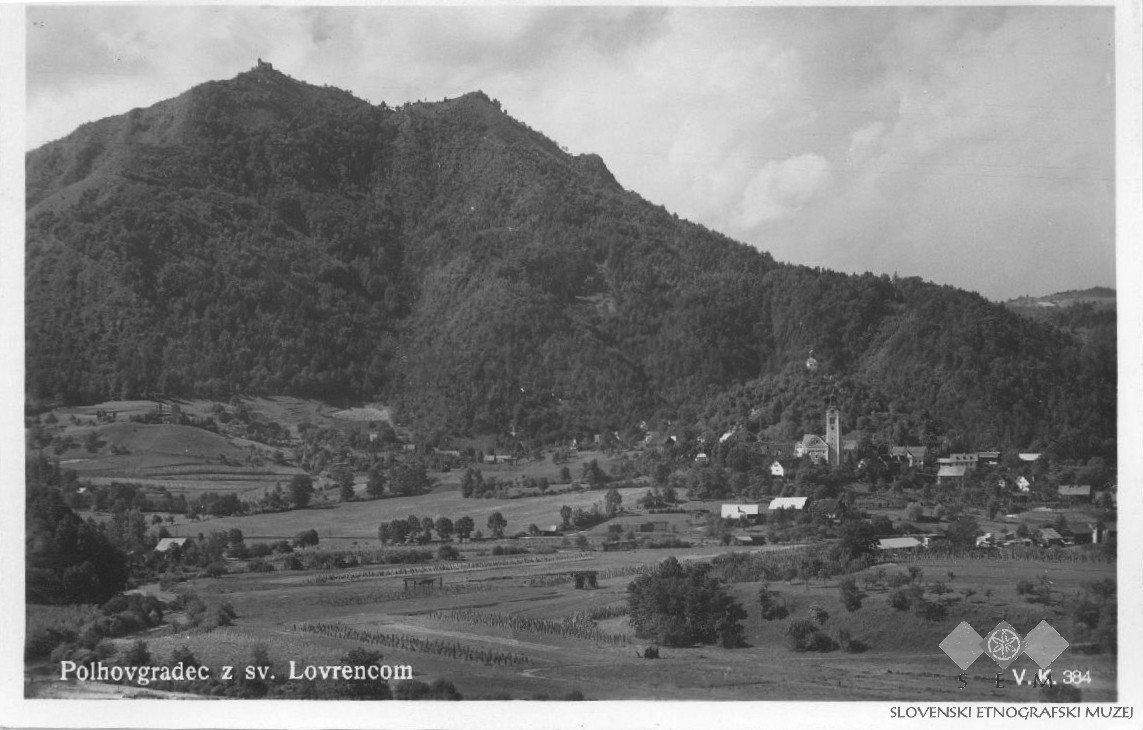

Highest point
- Elevation: 824 m (2,703 ft)
- Coordinates: 46°4′15″N 14°17′56″E

Naming
- Native name: (Polhograjska) Gora (Slovene); Polhograjska gora (Slovene); Pograjska gora (Slovene); Sveti Lovrenc (Slovene)

Geography
- Location within Slovenia Location within Alps
- Location: Slovenia
- Parent range: Polhov Gradec Hills

Mount Polhov Gradec (Slovene: (Polhograjska) Gora, Polhograjska gora, or Pograjska gora), also known as Mount Saint Lawrence (Slovene: Sveti Lovrenc, 824 meters or 2,703 feet), is a hill in the Polhov Gradec Hills. It rises above the town of Polhov Gradec.

== Church ==
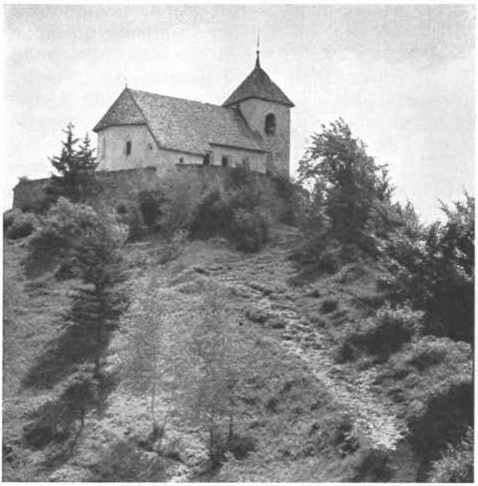
Saint Lawrence's Church

There is a church dedicated to Saint Lawrence at the top of the hill. The church was first mentioned in written sources in 1526.

== Cultural heritage ==
In addition to Saint Lawrence's Church, other cultural heritage features registered on Mount Polhov Gradec include the following:

- The Potok Chapel-Shrine (Kapelica na Potoku)—also known as the Logar Chapel-Shrine (Kapelica pri Logarju) or Gora Chapel-Shrine (Kapelica Na Gori)—dates from 1892. It stands between two large linden trees at house no. 18, northeast of the church.
- The Mount Saint Lawrence archaeological site (Slovene: Arheološko najdišče Gora sv. Lovrenca) encompasses the summit of the hill. It consists of the remnants of a late Roman-era fortified settlement on the northeast slope below the church with the remains of a defensive wall and smithy.
