= Setnica, Dobrova–Polhov Gradec =

Setnica
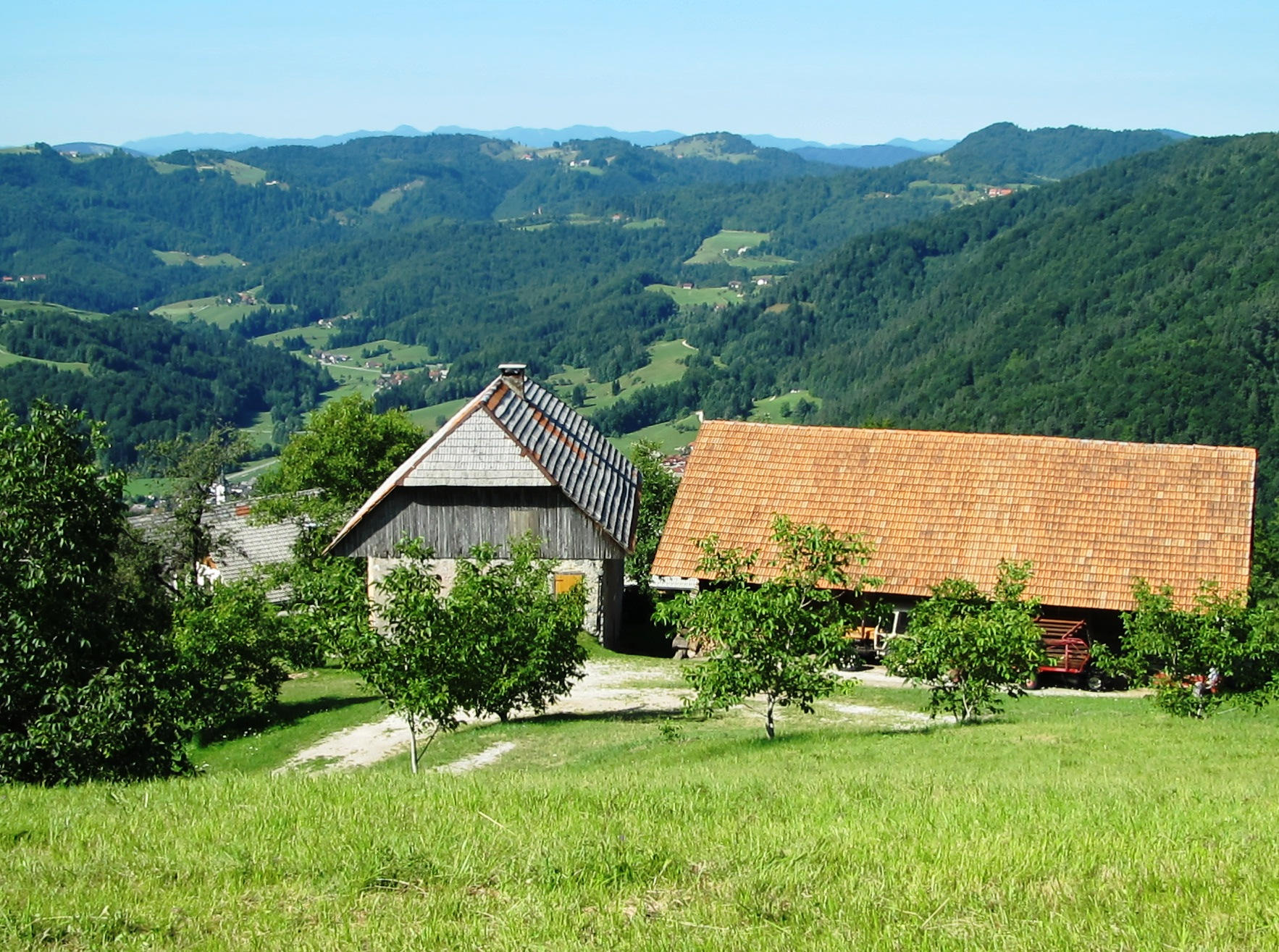
- The hamlet of Mežnar in Setnica

- Location in Slovenia
- Coordinates: 46°5′4.75″N 14°19′24.5″E
- Country: Slovenia
- Traditional region: Upper Carniola
- Statistical region: Central Slovenia
- Municipality: Dobrova–Polhov Gradec

Area
  - Total: 5.58 km^{2} (2.15 sq mi)
- Elevation: 513.2 m (1,684 ft)

Population (2020)
  - Total: 47
  - Density: 8.4/km^{2} (22/sq mi)

Setnica (pronounced [sɛˈtniːtsa]) is a settlement that is divided between the municipalities of Dobrova–Polhov Gradec and Medvode in the Upper Carniola region of Slovenia.

== Geography ==
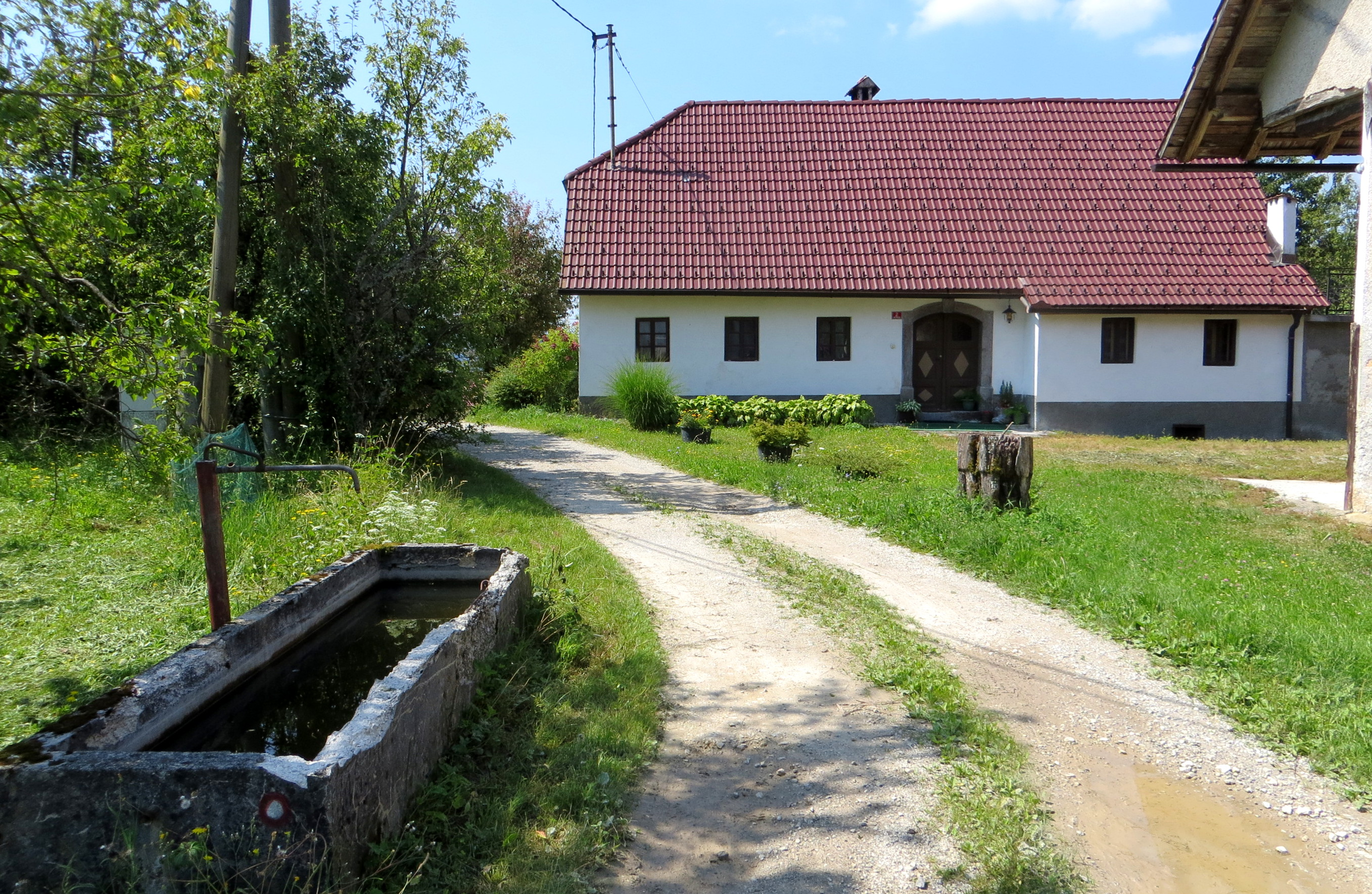
The hamlet of Ravnek

Setnica includes the hamlets of Ravnek to the south, Mežnar below Saint Ursula's Church, and Kobilca in the Maček Gorge (Slovene: Mačkov graben). The highest point in the village is Grmada Hill (898 meters or 2,946 feet), which stands to the east.

== Name ==
Setnica is known as Snica in the local dialect. In the 19th century it was known as Setnitza in German.

== Church ==
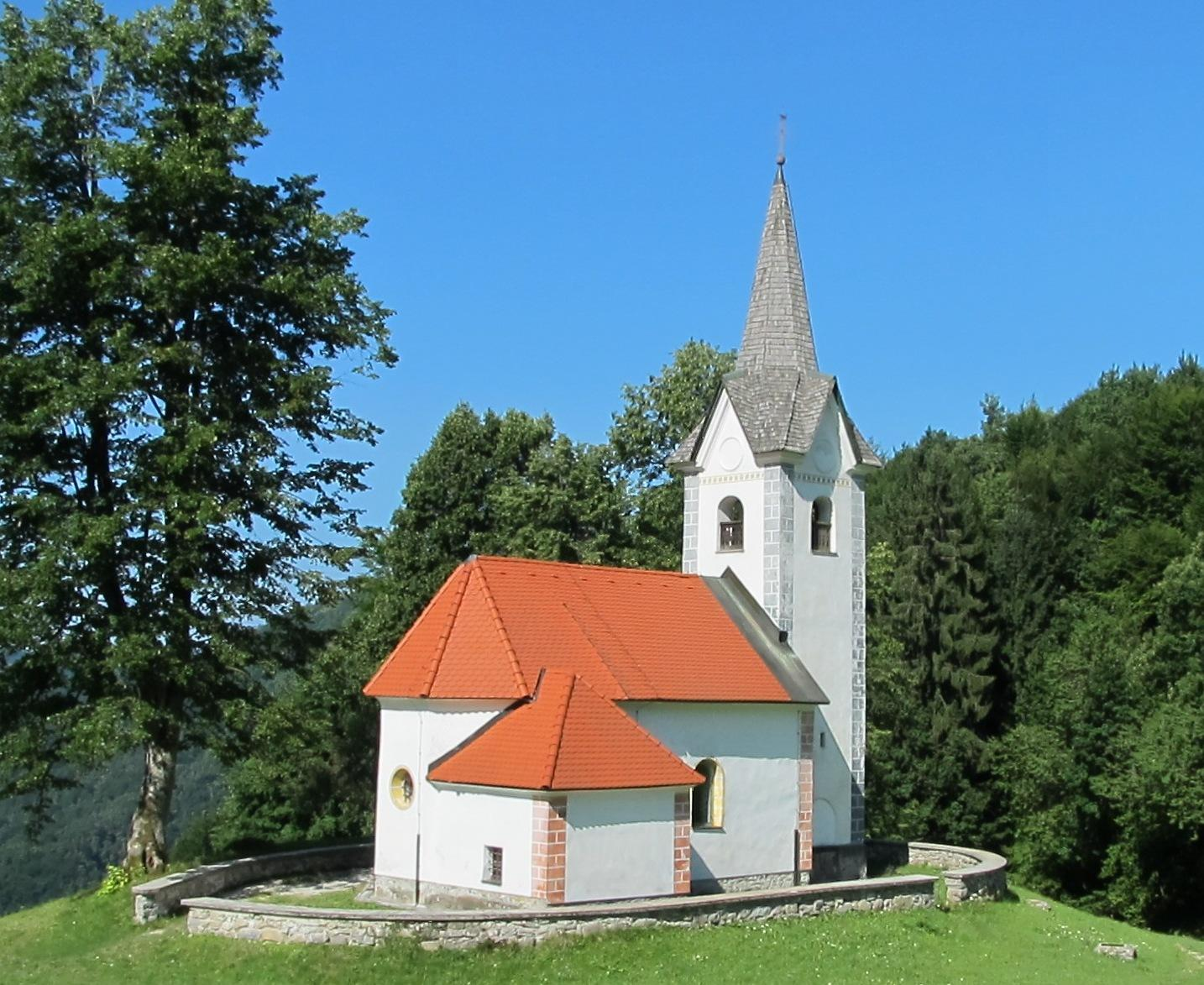
Saint Ursula's Church

The local church, built on a hill above the settlement, is dedicated to Saint Ursula. It was first mentioned in documents dating to 1526. The rectangular nave dates to the early sixteenth century. The belfry was added later. The altar dates from 1685 and the church was remodeled in the Baroque style in the 18th century.

== Clandestine grave ==
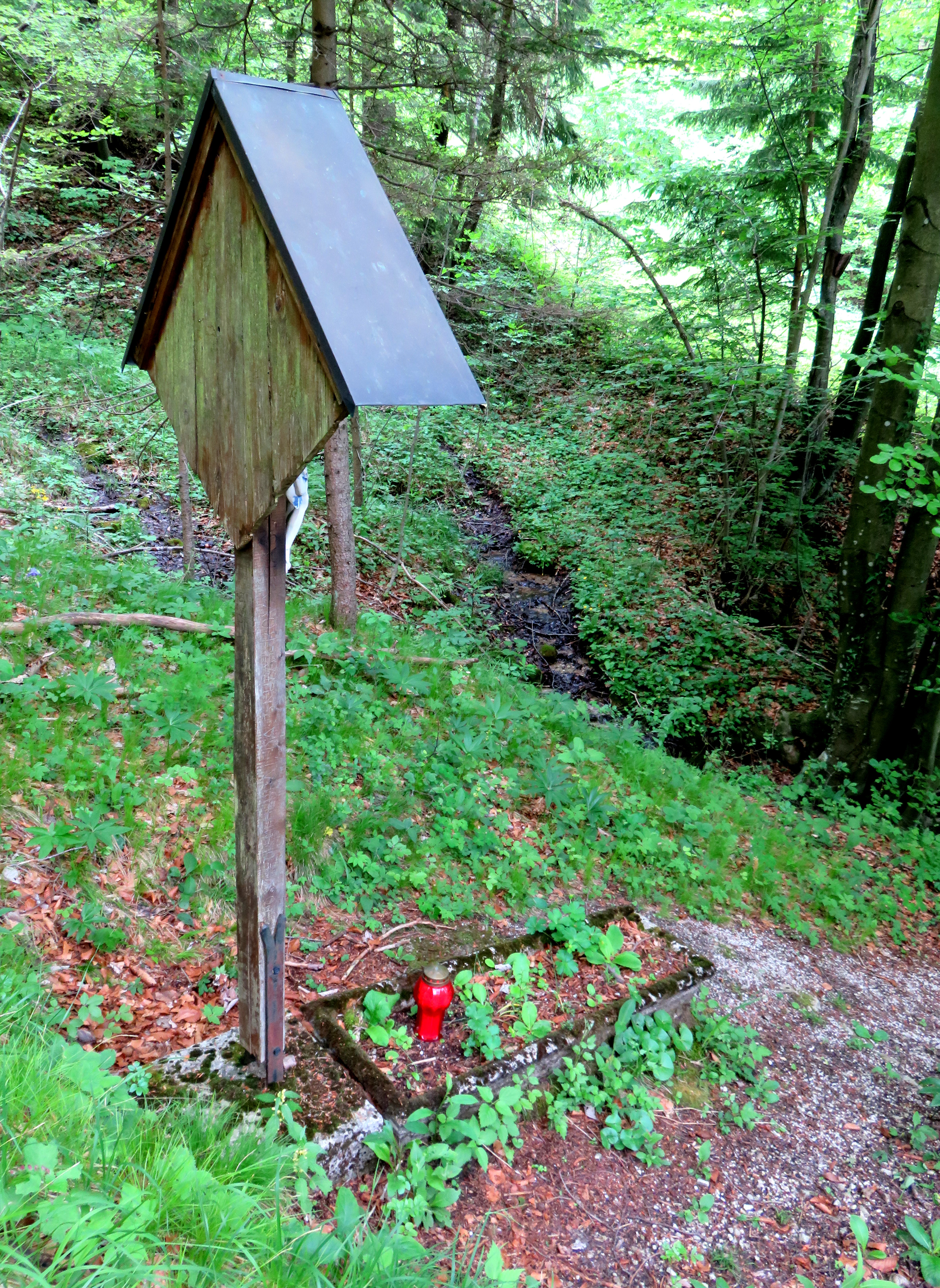
The Serbian Officer's Grave

Setnica is the site of a clandestine grave from the period immediately after the Second World War. The Serbian Officer's Grave (Slovene: Grob srbskega častnika) lies on a mountain path about 230 m northeast of the farm at Setnica no. 10. It contains the remains of a Serbian officer from the Serbian Volunteer Corps that was shot in May 1945 after fleeing from the prison in Šentvid, Ljubljana.

== Notable people ==
Notable people that were born or lived in Setnica include:

- Jernej Trnovec (1846–1933), wood carver
