= Kucja Valley =

Geological feature in Slovenia

Coordinates: 46°04′42.95″N 14°26′11.57″E

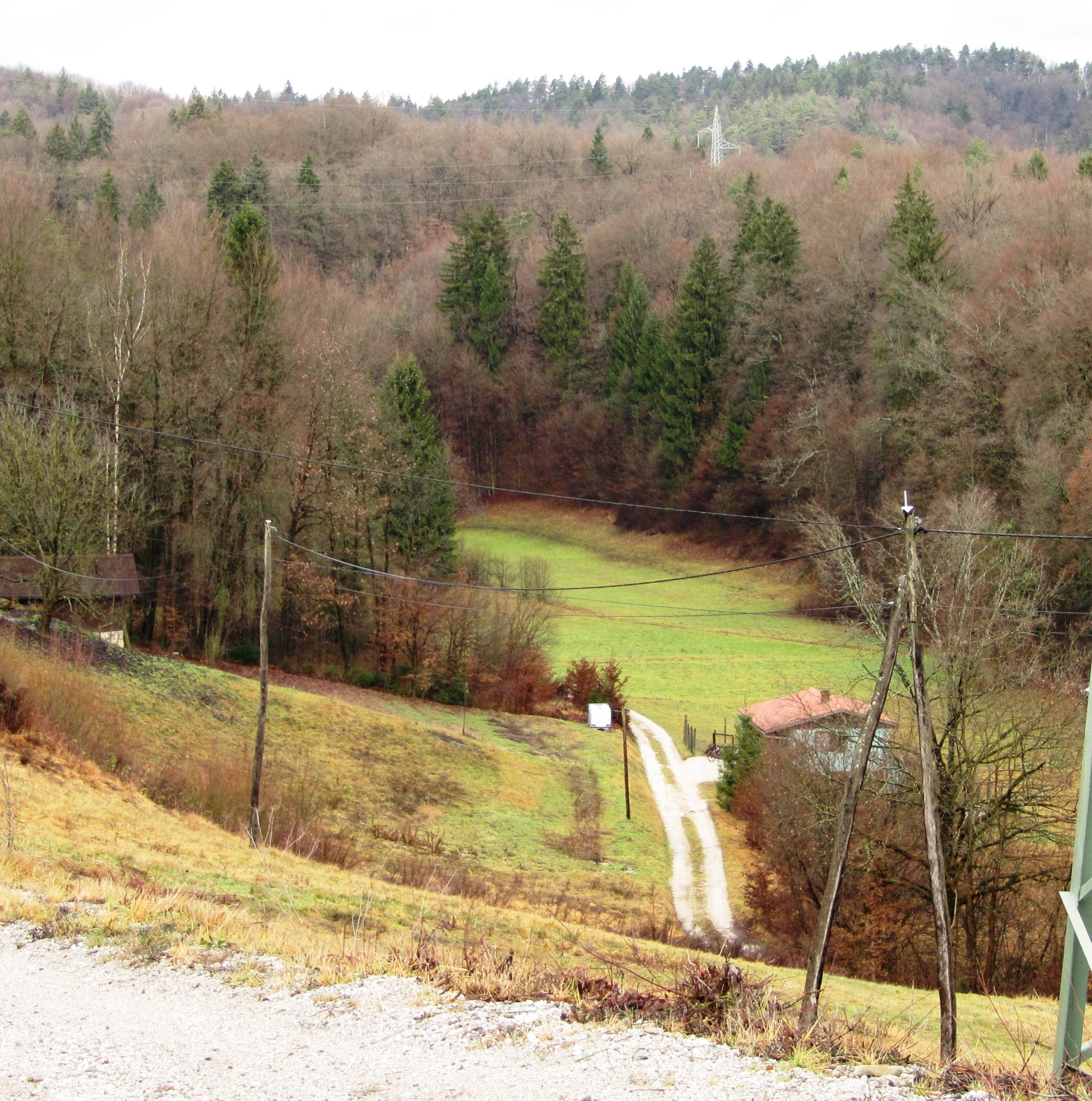
The Kucja Valley

The Kucja Valley (Slovene: Kucja dolina) is a blind valley on the outskirts of Ljubljana, central Slovenia. Administratively, it belongs to the Dravlje District. The name may be derived from Slovene kucelj 'hill, rise', referring to the terminus of the valley. Geologically, it lies at the conjunction of a more gravelly layer with a more compact limestone layer.

== Mass graves ==
The Kucja Valley is the location of two sites connected with extrajudicial killings after the Second World War: the Big Brezar Shaft Mass Grave (Slovene: Grobišče Veliko Brezarjevo brezno) and the Kucja Valley Mass Grave (Slovene: Grobišče v Kucji dolini). At the end of May 1945 over 800 people were killed and their bodies were thrown into the Big Brezar Shaft. The victims were a mix of Slovenian and Croatian prisoners of war from the St. Stanislaus Institute in nearby Šentvid (which was being used as an internment center by the Partisans) and civilians, including women.

The large number of bodies poisoned the groundwater in the area. Livestock refused to drink from the nearby spring in Podutik and local people noticed that the color and taste of the water had changed. Because of increasing talk among the local population, the communist authorities first tried to block the connection between the Big Brezar Shaft and the spring with a concrete barrier. German POWs were then forced to remove the bodies from the shaft on 12 and 13 June 1945 and bury them in the nearby mass grave at the head of the Kucja Valley. After this the German POWs were executed and buried together with the bodies they had moved.

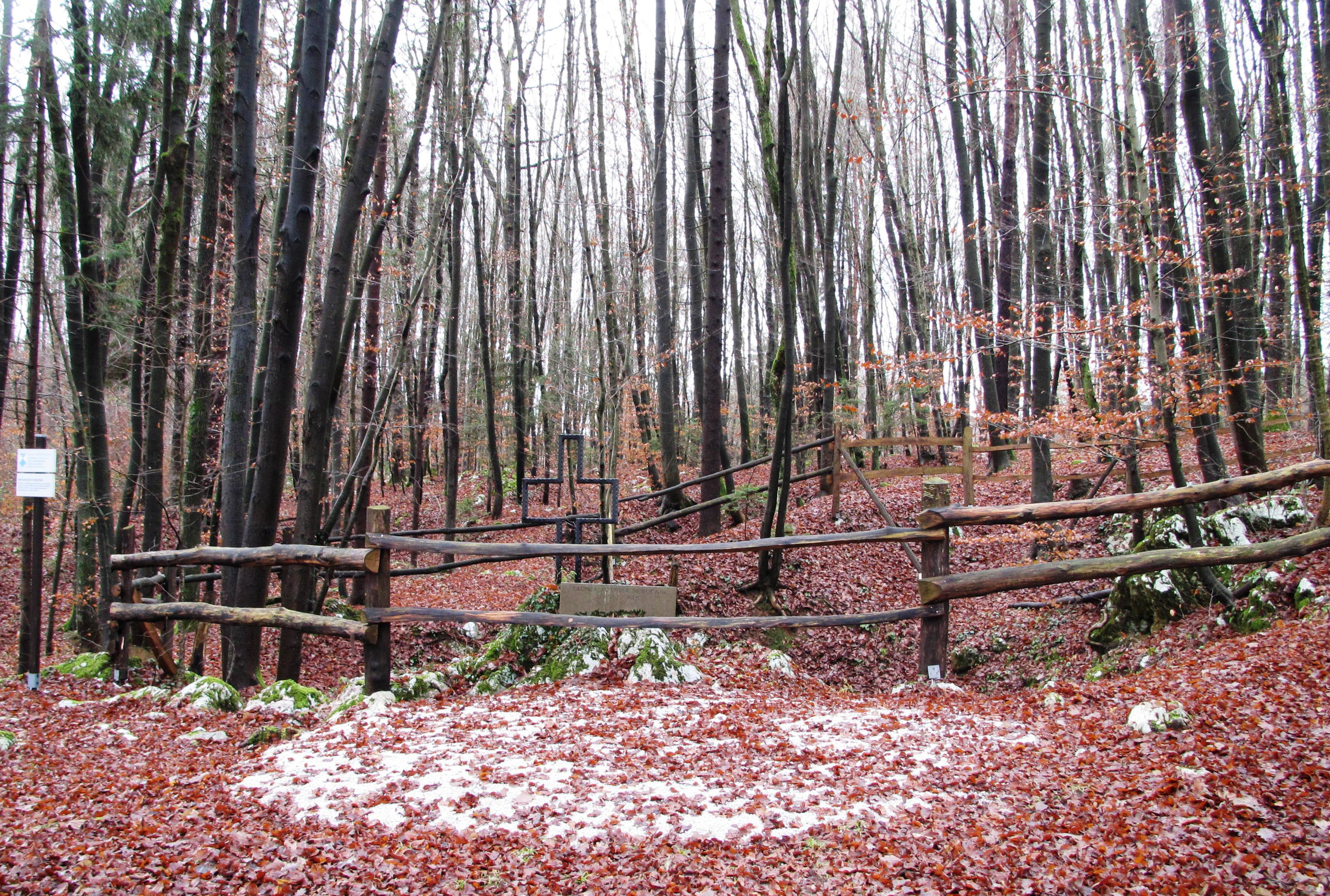
The Big Brezar Shaft Mass Grave

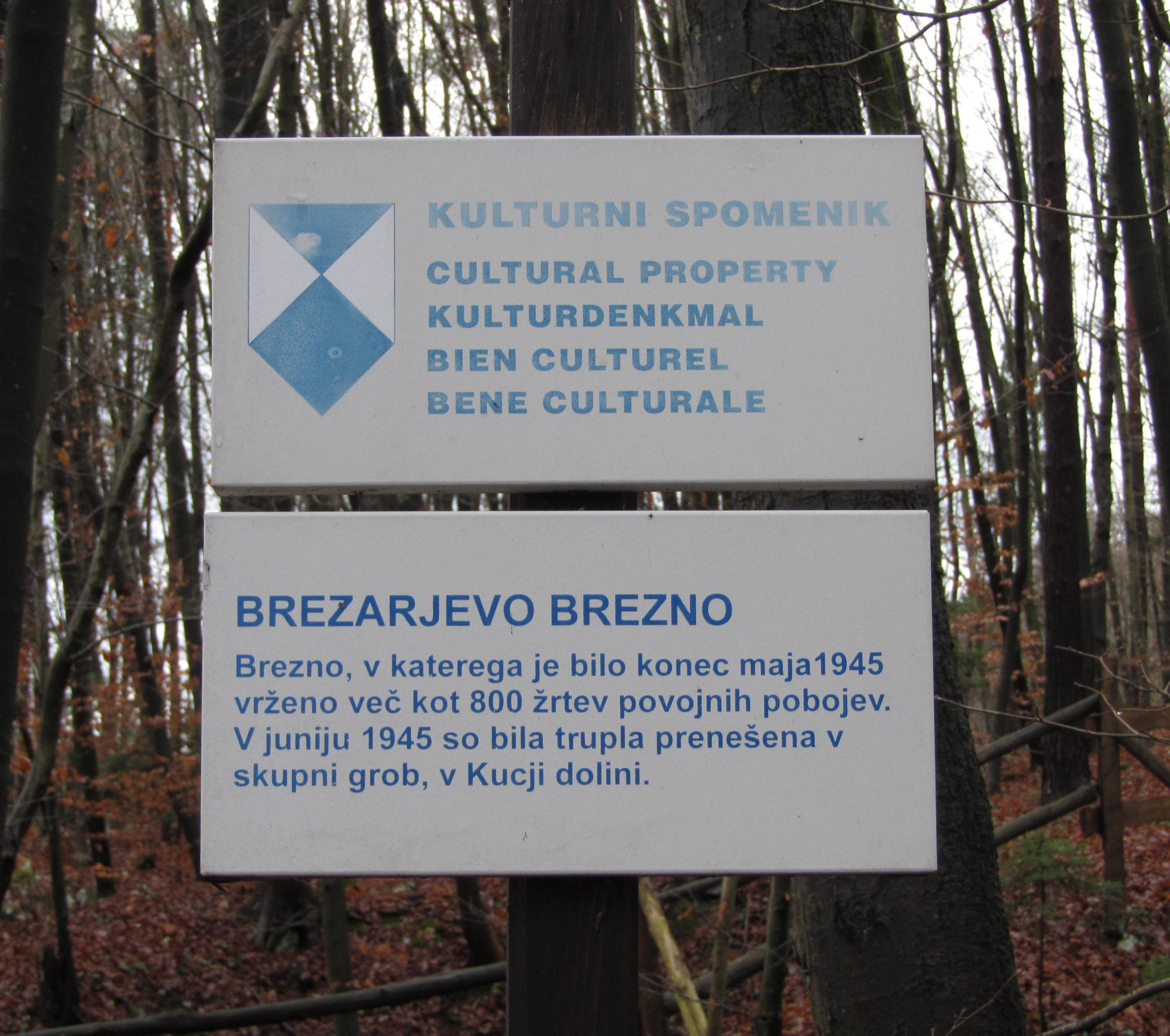
Signpost at the Big Brezar Shaft Mass Grave

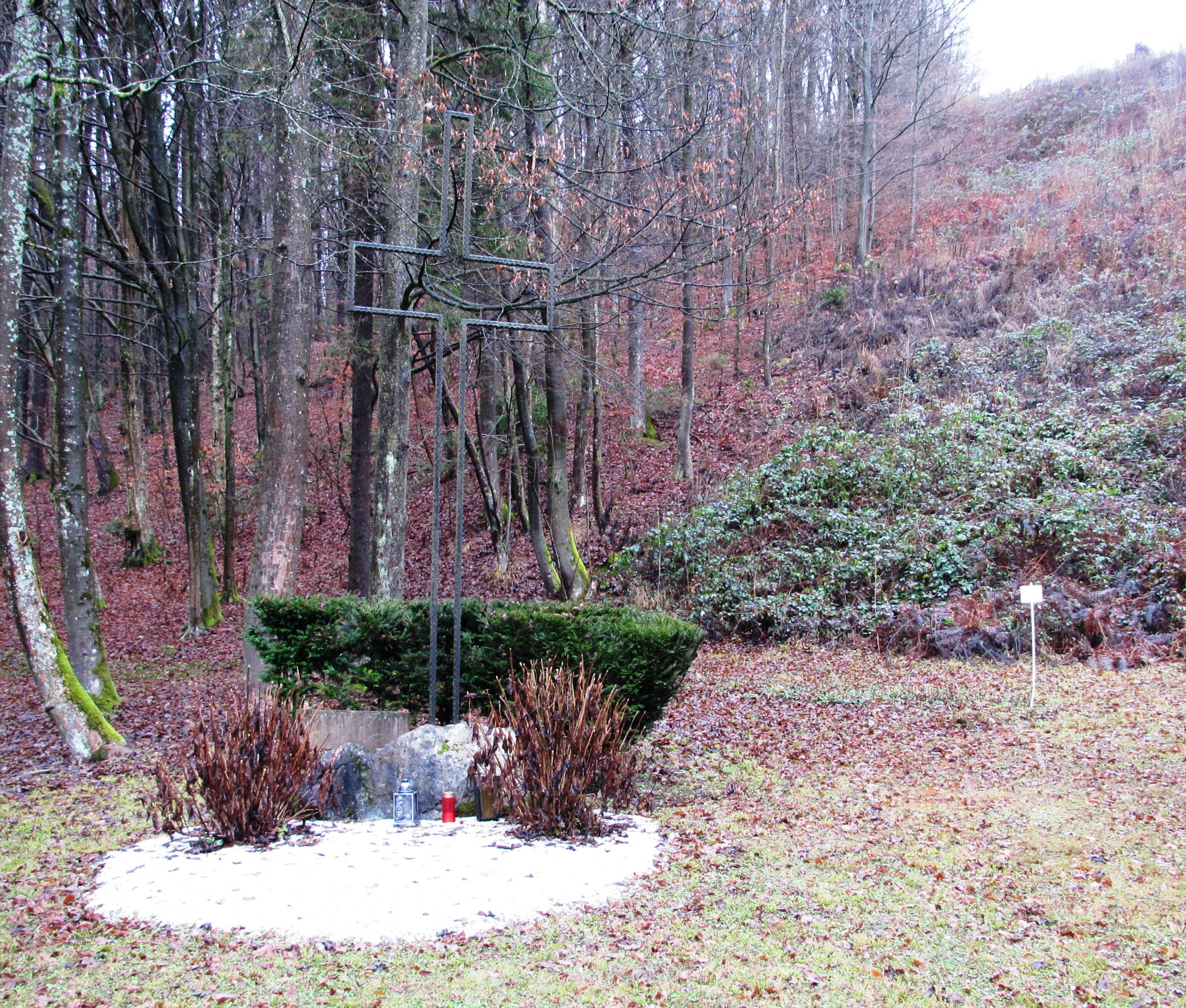
The Kucja Valley Mass Grave

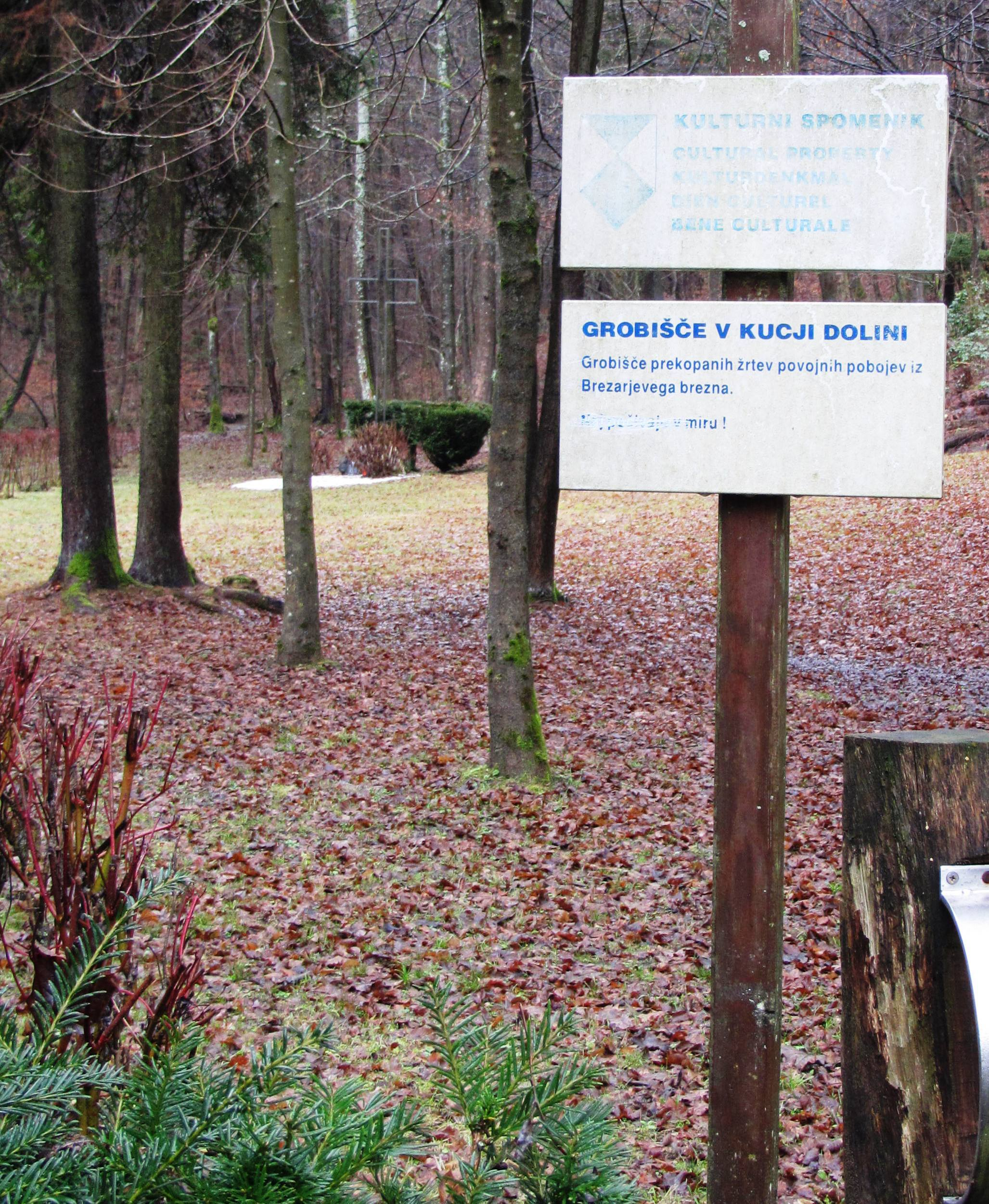
Signpost at the Kucja Valley Mass Grave (defaced with "Rest in peace" obliterated)
