= Šentvid (Ljubljana) =

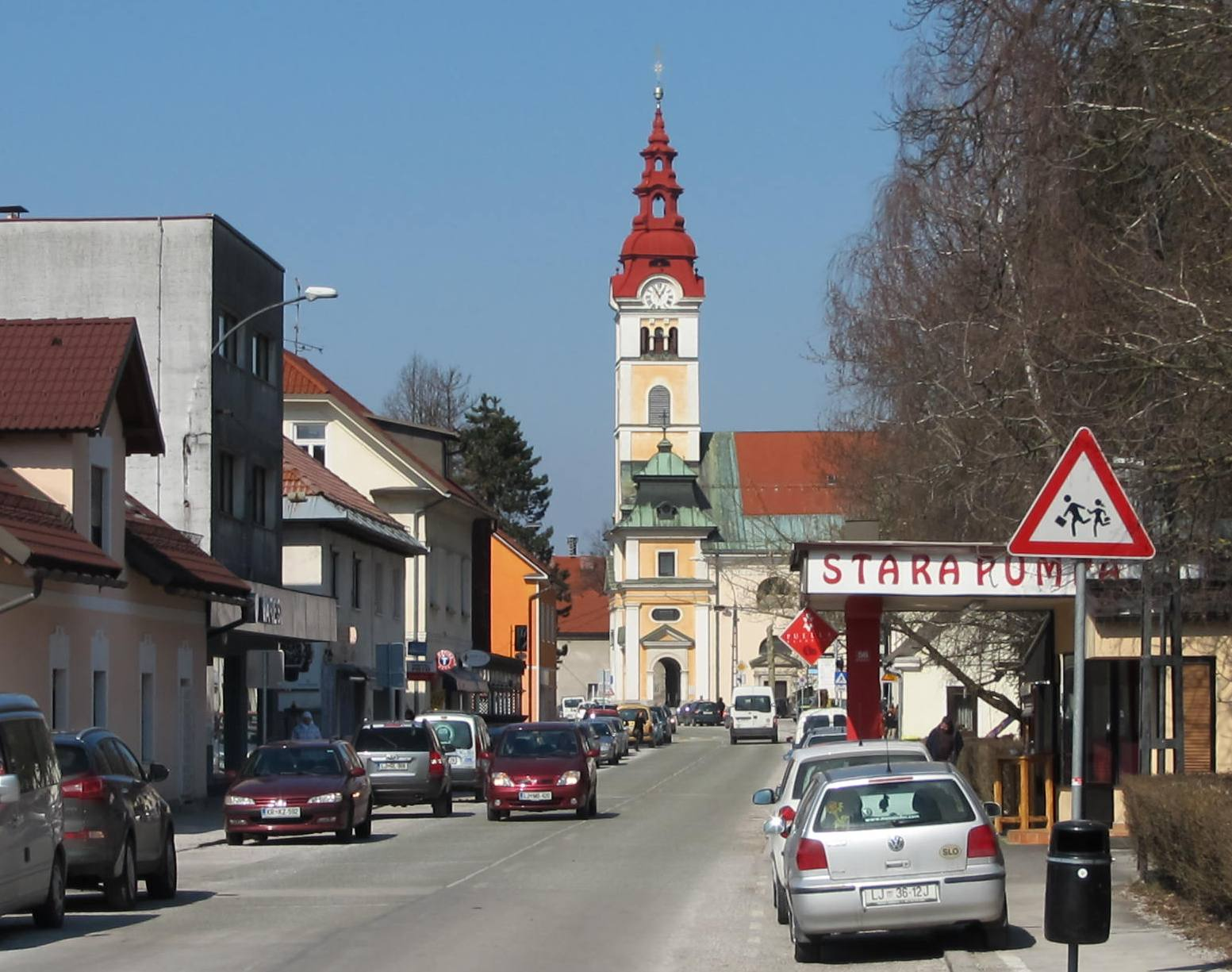

- Location in Slovenia
- Coordinates: 46°5′50″N 14°27′59″E
- Country: Slovenia
- Traditional region: Upper Carniola
- Statistical region: Central Slovenia
- Municipality: Ljubljana
- Elevation: 316 m (1,037 ft)

Šentvid (pronounced [ʃɛnˈtʋiːt]; formerly also Šent Vid nad Ljubljano, German: Sankt Veit) is a part of Ljubljana, the capital of Slovenia. Until 1974 an independent village in Upper Carniola, it is today the centre of the Šentvid District, one of the districts of the Municipality of Ljubljana.

== Name ==
Šentvid was first mentioned in written sources in 1262 as plebanus Sancti Viti. The Slovene name Šentvid is a compound of Slovene šent 'saint' and Vid 'Vitus', referring to the parish church of Saint Vitus. In the past, the village was also known as Šent Vid nad Ljubljano (literally, 'Saint Vitus above Ljubljana'). The settlement was known as Sankt Veit in German.

== Geography ==
The central street in Šentvid was named Prušnik Street (Slovene: Prušnikova ulica) in 1980 after the Carinthian Slovene Partisan activist Karel Prušnik (1910–1980). Until 1977, it was part of Klagenfurt Street (Celovška cesta), one of the main city arteries. The current Klagenfurt Street bypasses the central part of Šentvid along its western side.

== History ==
Šentvid was already inhabited in prehistoric times. Archaeological finds from the area include a lance from the Urnfield culture, an arrow from the Hallstatt culture, and a Celtic silver coin. A prehistoric fortress stood on Big Trata Hill (Slovene: Velika Trata) west of the village, and Roman coins have been found in the settlement.

An elementary school was established in Šentvid in 1866, and a four-year lower secondary school was established in 1928. The St. Stanislaus Institute, an upper secondary school, was established in 1901.

In World War II, Šentvid was occupied by Nazi Germany on 20 April 1941. The Germans established an internment camp there for deportations of Slovenes into Serbia. German attacks against the Slovene Partisans in the Polhov Gradec Hills were led from Šentvid. The German–Italian border ran just behind Šentvid. In August 1942, the writer and resistance activist Tone Čufar (born 1905) was shot in Šentvid by the Germans. During the war, the Gestapo requisitioned the St. Stanislaus Institute. After the war, the building was used as a collection center for captured Slovene Home Guard troops and two mass graves were created nearby.

Šentvid remained an independent settlement until 1974, when it was annexed by Ljubljana. It is now the name of a district of the city.

== Parish and church ==
The proto-parish of Šentvid is one of the oldest in the Ljubljana region, and was already established by 1085, when it was subject to the Patriarchate of Aquileia. In 1351, Patriarch Nicholas granted patronage rights to his military ally, Archduke Albrecht. The parish was transferred to the newly founded Diocese of Ljubljana in 1461. The proto-parish of Šentvid was later divided into the parishes of Polhov Gradec, Črni Vrh, Šentjošt, Horjul, Dobrova, and Sveta Katarina.

The parish church in Šentvid is dedicated to Saint Vitus. It was built in 1796, replacing an older structure, and was extended eastwards after the 1895 Ljubljana earthquake, when the exterior was also remodeled. The old altars in the church are the work of Matej Tomc (1814–1885). The main altar and the altar dedicated to the Virgin Mary date to 1854, and the altars dedicated to Saint Nicholas, John the Baptist, and Saint Anthony of Padua date to 1870. The painting of the Virgin Mary is by Matevž Langus (1792–1855), and the painting of Saint Joseph by Henrika Langus (1836–1876). More recent altar paintings are the work of Tone Kralj, and the baptismal font was designed by Jože Plečnik.

== Notable people ==
Notable people that were born or lived in Šentvid include:

- Anton Belec (1857–1940), who built the Aljaž Tower in 1895, now atop Triglav
- Franc Bernik (1870–1948), religious writer and local historian
- Anton Bitenc (1920–1977), architect
- Janko Jovan (1878–1941), business writer
- Sonja Lapajne-Oblak (1906–1993) architect, civil engineer and partisan fighter
- Gašper Porenta (1870–1930), painter
- Blaž Potočnik (1799–1872), poet, composer, and member of the national awakening movement
- Frank Sakser (1859–1937), editor and publisher
- Franjo Sič (1893–1953), textbook writer
- Josip Slovnik (1881–1960), painter
- Andrej Snoj (1886–1962), theology professor and Biblical scholar
- Franc Štrukelj (1841–1895), journalist and translator
- Miroslav Tomc (1850–1894), painter and composer
- Ferdinand Vonča (1792–1840), religious writer
- Ivan Žvan (1829–1920), who established the first Slovene mountain hiking society in 1872, the Friends of Triglav (Triglavski prijatelji)
