= Topol pri Medvodah =

Topol pri Medvodah Katarina nad Medvodami (until 1955)
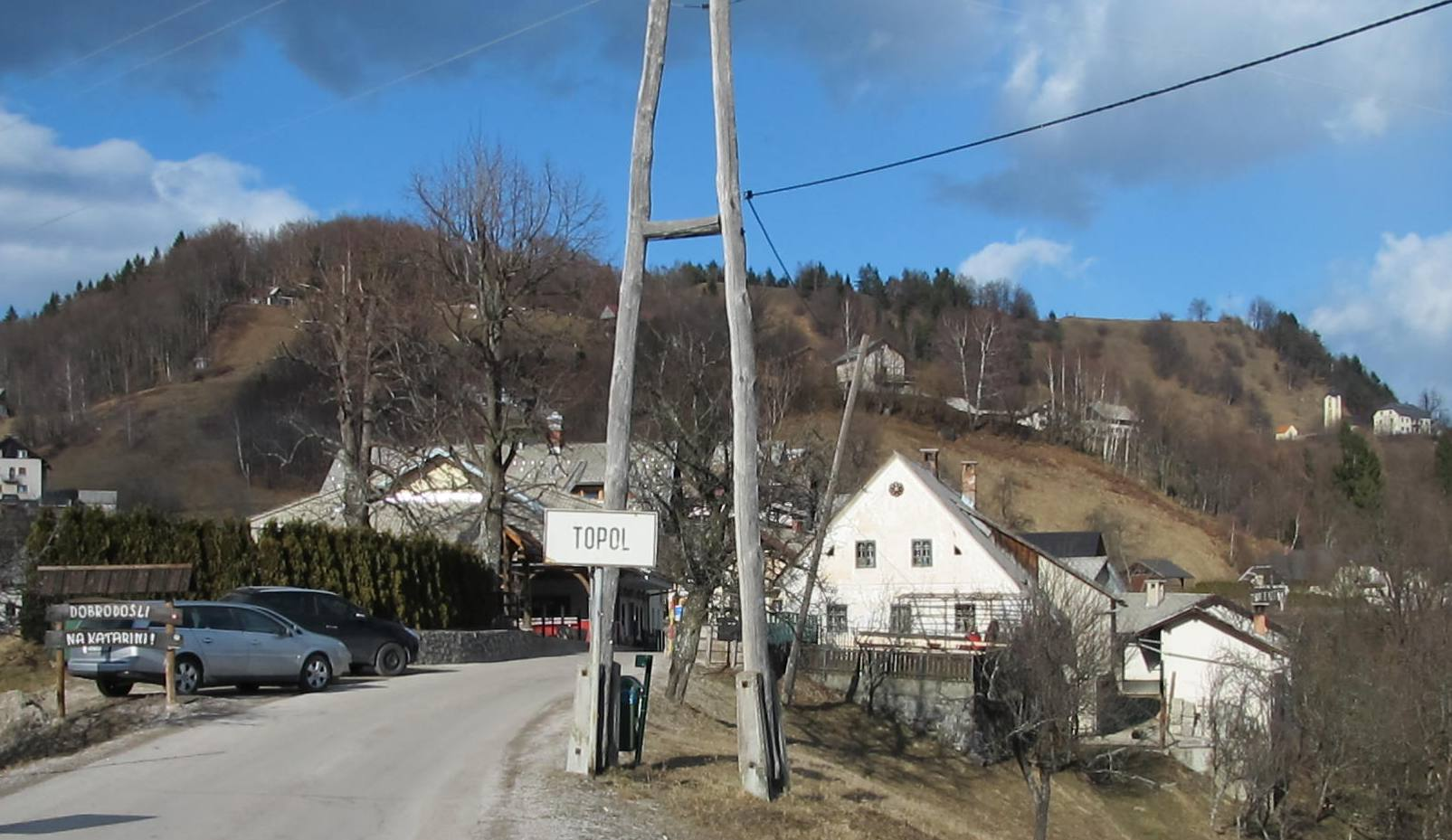
- Topol pri Medvodah. The sign at left reads "Welcome to Katarina."

- Location in Slovenia
- Coordinates: 46°5′37.59″N 14°22′38.25″E
- Country: Slovenia
- Traditional region: Upper Carniola
- Statistical region: Central Slovenia
- Municipality: Medvode

Area
  - Total: 3.77 km^{2} (1.46 sq mi)
- Elevation: 645.6 m (2,118 ft)

Population (2002)
  - Total: 151

Topol pri Medvodah (pronounced [ˈtɔːpɔl pɾi mɛˈdʋoːdax]) is a small settlement in the Municipality of Medvode in the Upper Carniola region of Slovenia. It lies in the hills northwest of the Slovene capital Ljubljana and is a popular destination for short trips with locals.

== Name ==
The name of the settlement was changed from (Sveta) Katarina nad Medvodami (literally, 'Saint Catherine above Medvode') to Topol (literally, 'poplar') in 1955. The name was changed on the basis of the 1948 Law on Names of Settlements and Designations of Squares, Streets, and Buildings as part of efforts by Slovenia's postwar communist government to remove religious elements from toponyms. However, its old name is still often used in the modified form Katarina nad Ljubljano (literally, '(Saint) Catherine above Ljubljana').

== Church ==
The local church is dedicated to Saint Catherine. It is an early Baroque church dating from the beginning of the 17th century. The chancel was painted by Ivan and Helena Vurnik in 1919 and 1920, and the main altar was created by Ivan Vurnik. The painting of Saint Catherine is by Helena Vurnik, and France Kralj created the altar cross. The church is surrounded by a cemetery that features a First World War monument and a cemetery chapel.

There is a wooden cross on Rog Hill (798 meters or 2,618 feet) above the church. The cross was erected on May 5, 1935 to commemorate the 1935 Eucharistic Congress in Ljubljana. The cross was pulled down by the postwar communist authorities, but was re-erected after the fall of communism at the initiative of Father Volk in 2000 and was blessed by former Archbishop of Belgrade Franc Perko.

== Cultural heritage ==
In addition to Saint Catherine's Church, several other structures in Topol pri Medvodah have protected cultural monument status:

- The farm at Topol pri Medvodah no. 21 has a two-story partially remodeled house with the year 1847 carved into the door casing. It has Gothic stonemasonry elements. The farm also has a two-story masonry granary with frescoes, a fruit-drying shed, and two single hay racks. It stands to the southeast, below the Church of Saint Catherine.
- The farm at Topol pri Medvodah no. 25 has a stone house that is the former home of a sacristan; it is built into a slope and has a semi-cellar and a black door casing dating from 1850. The property also consists of a partially masonry stable with a hayloft dating from 1832, a masonry barn, a masonry granary, a wooden beehive, and a wayside cross. It stands in the hamlet of Dobje, east of the Church of St. Catherine.
- A masonry chapel-shrine dedicated to the Sacred Heart stands in the hamlet of Grapce. It has a gabled roof and a niche with a sculpture featuring the sacred heart, and dates from the first half of the 19th century.
- A restored masonry chapel-shrine dedicated to Saint Joseph stands at a crossroads in the northern part of the settlement. It has a gabled roof and features a statue of Saint Joseph with two angels. It dates from the second half of the 19th century.
- The landscape in the eastern part of the village, comprising the church, rectory, linden tree, and cemetery, is recognized as a characteristic cultural landscape of the Polhov Gradec Hills.
- A monument to the Partisan soldiers and those that died in concentration camps in the Second World War stands on the southern edge of the village, along the road from Dobrova to Topol. It consists of a four-meter carved wooden sculpture on a masonry base. The work was created by France Tavčar and was installed in 1978.
- A bronze bust of the Yugoslav people's hero Janez Kalan (a.k.a. Kosec), created by Anton Sigulin, is mounted on a natural stone pedestal on the side of the elementary school at Topol pri Medvodah 17, next to the entrance. The bust was installed on 21 May 1972.

== Notable people ==
Notable people that were born or lived in Topol pri Medvodah include:

- Frančišek Dobnikar (1878–1901), illustrator
- Franc Pustavrh (1827–1871), priest and painter

== Gallery ==
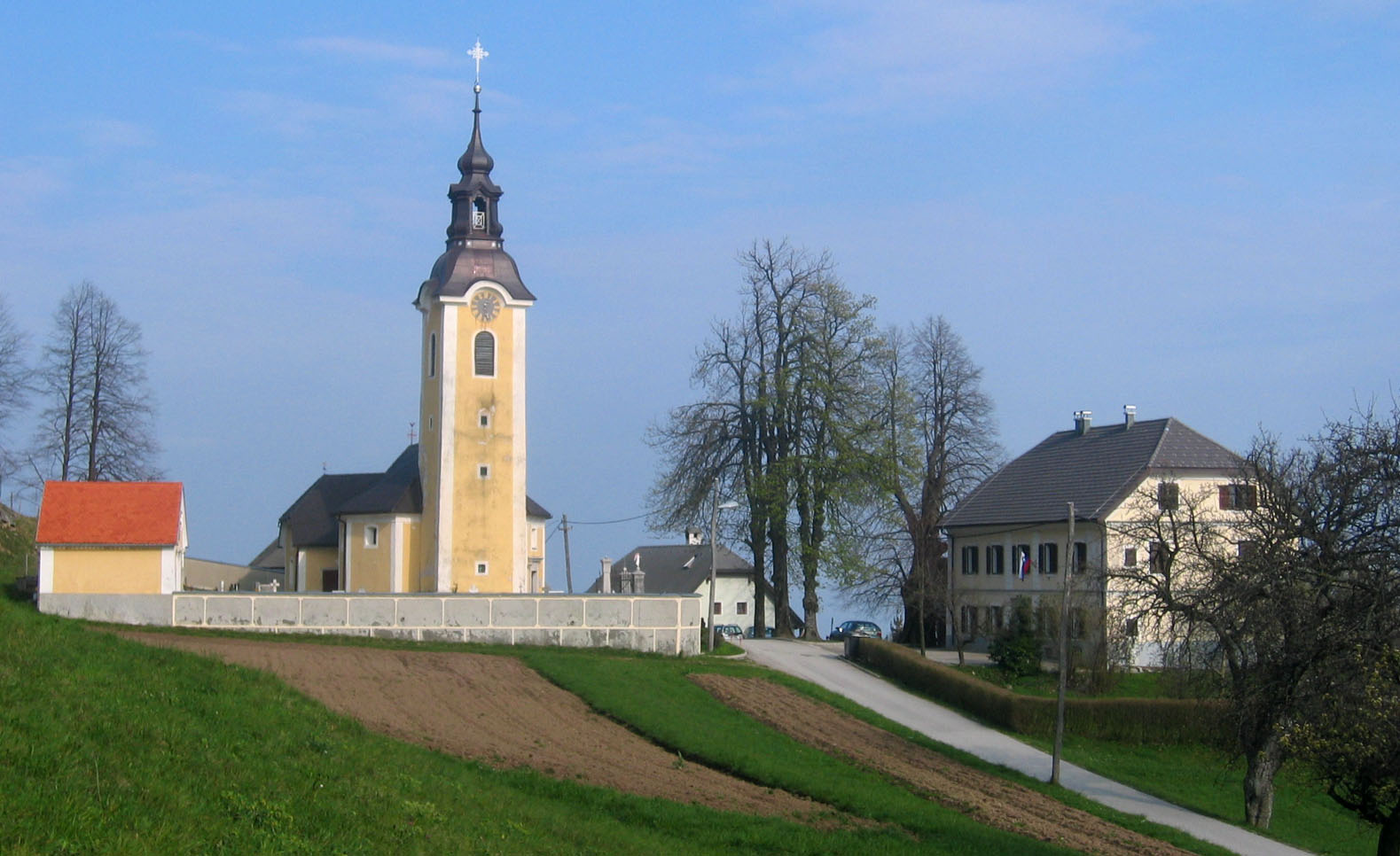
Cultural landscape: church, rectory, linden tree, and cemetery

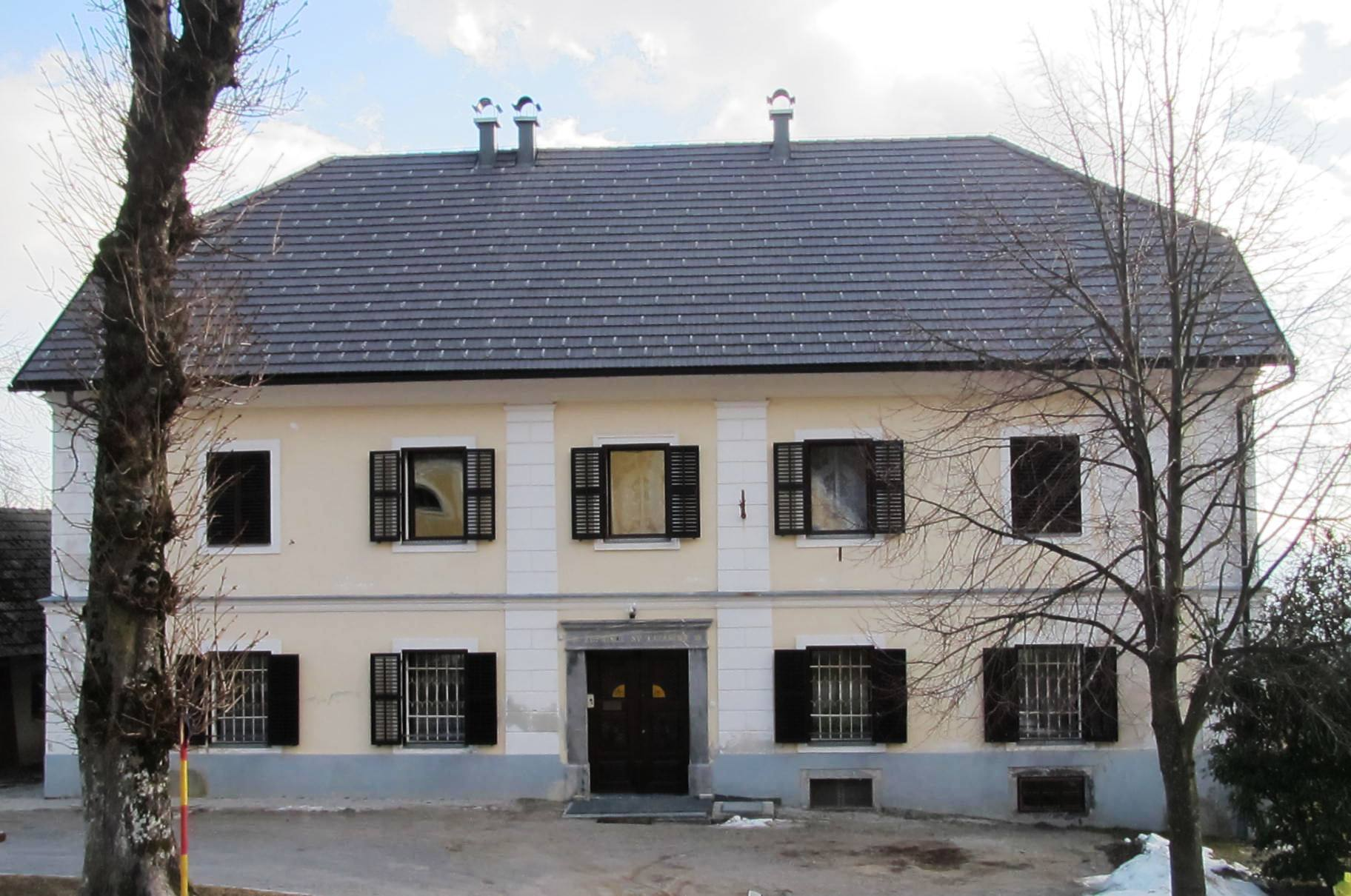
Rectory in Topol pri Medvodah

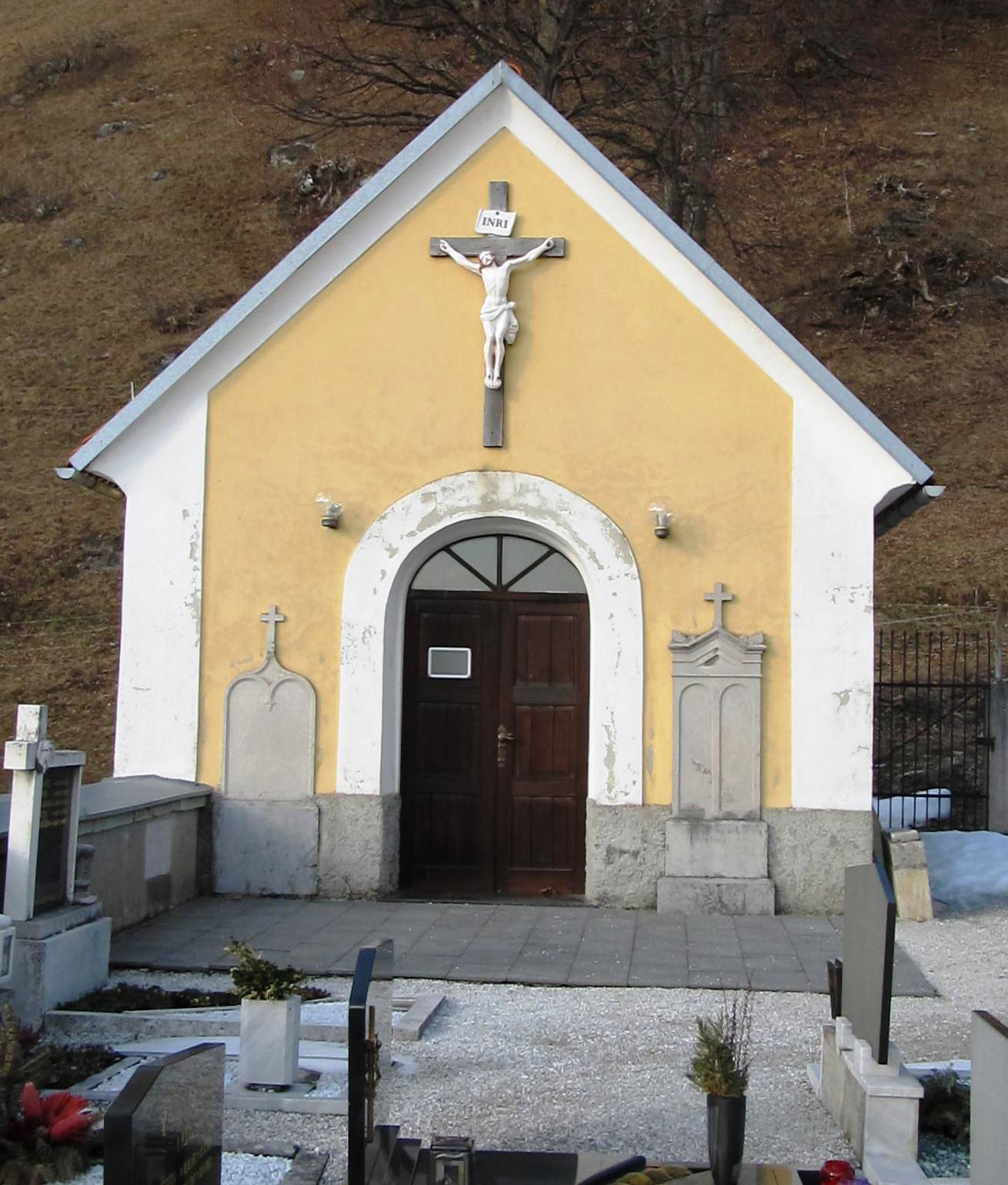
Cemetery chapel in Topol pri Medvodah

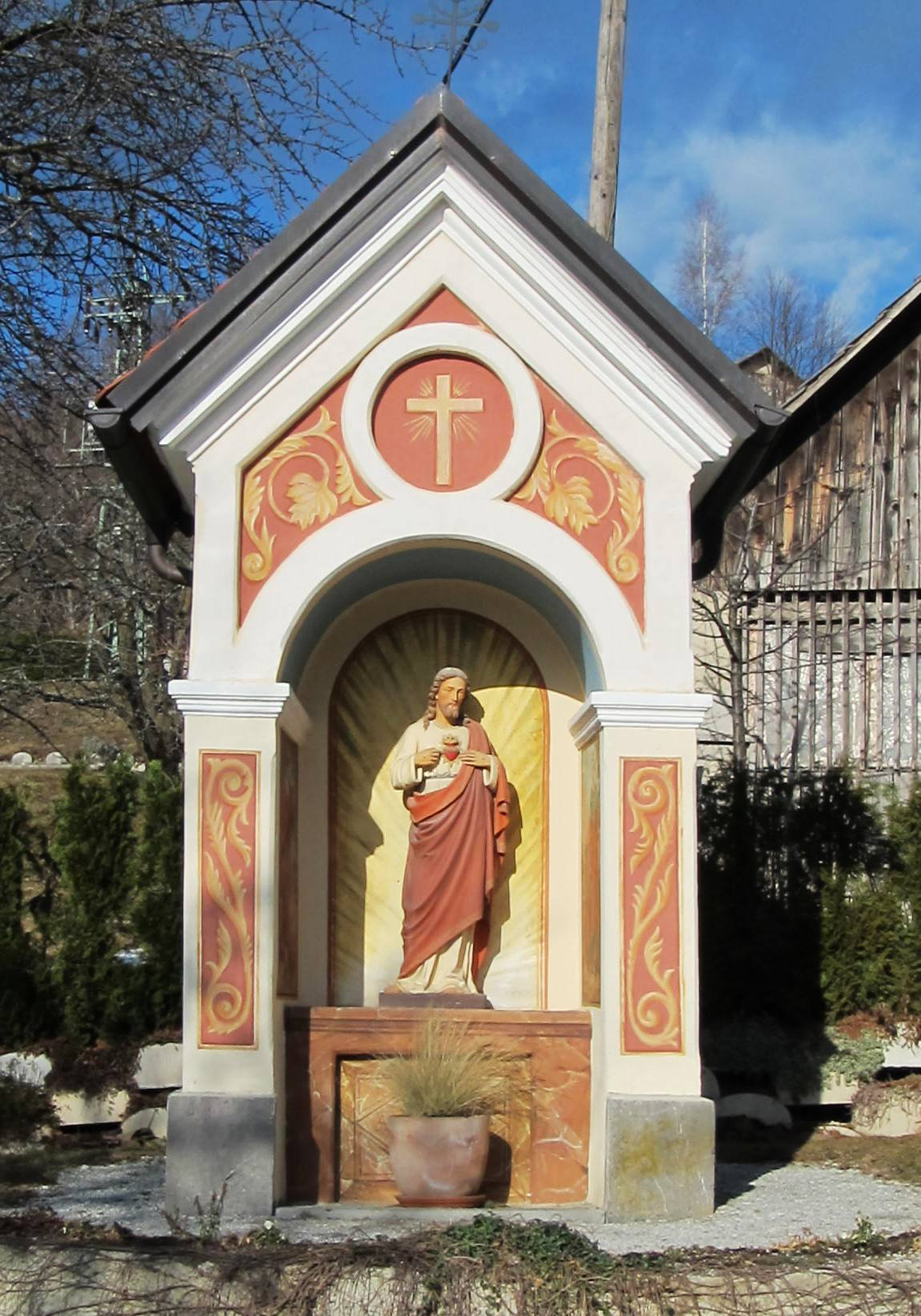
Chapel-shrine to the Sacred Heart in the hamlet of Grapce

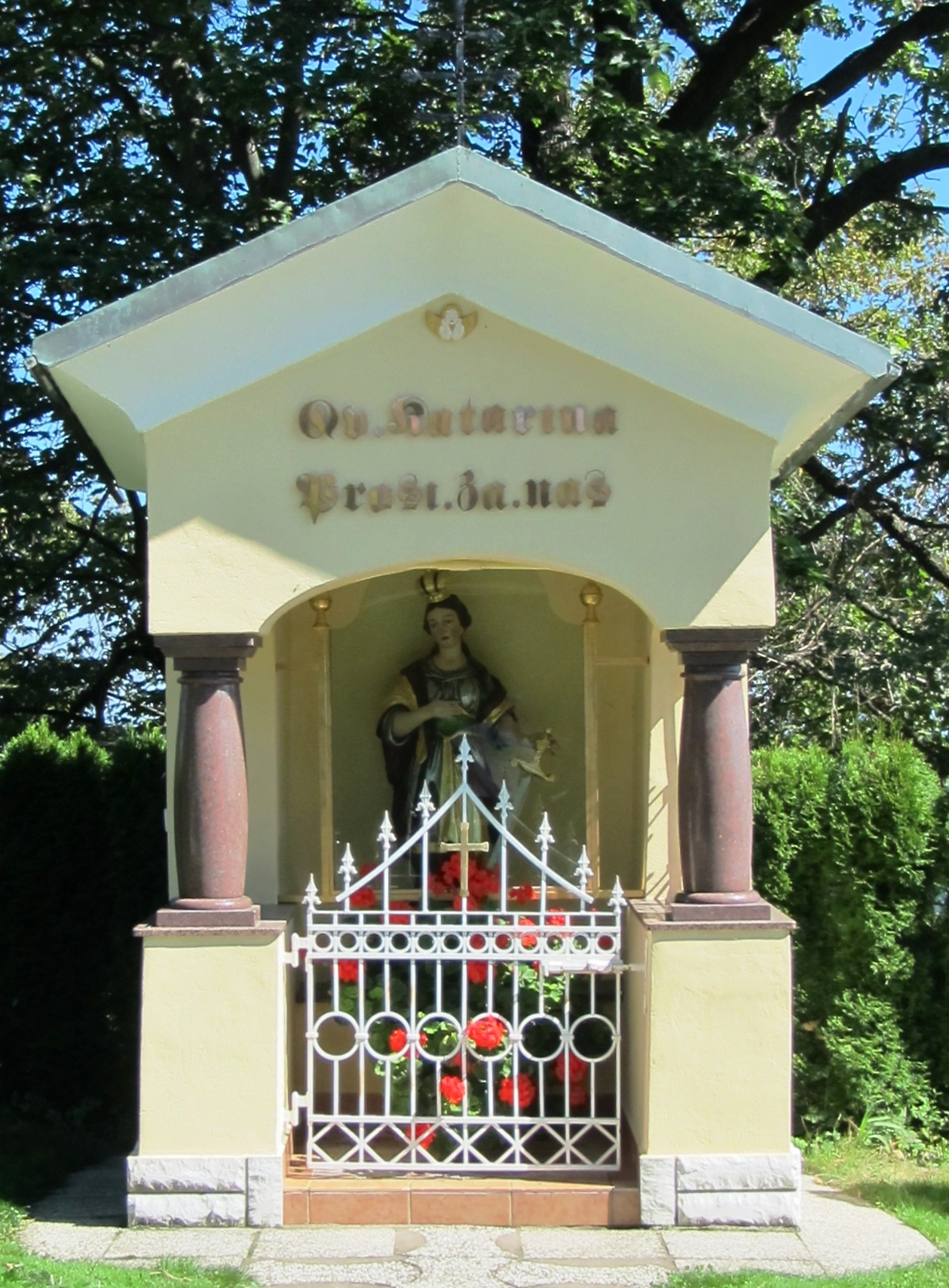
Chapel-shrine dedicated to St. Catherine
