= Polhov Gradec Hills =

Hilly region of northwestern Slovenia

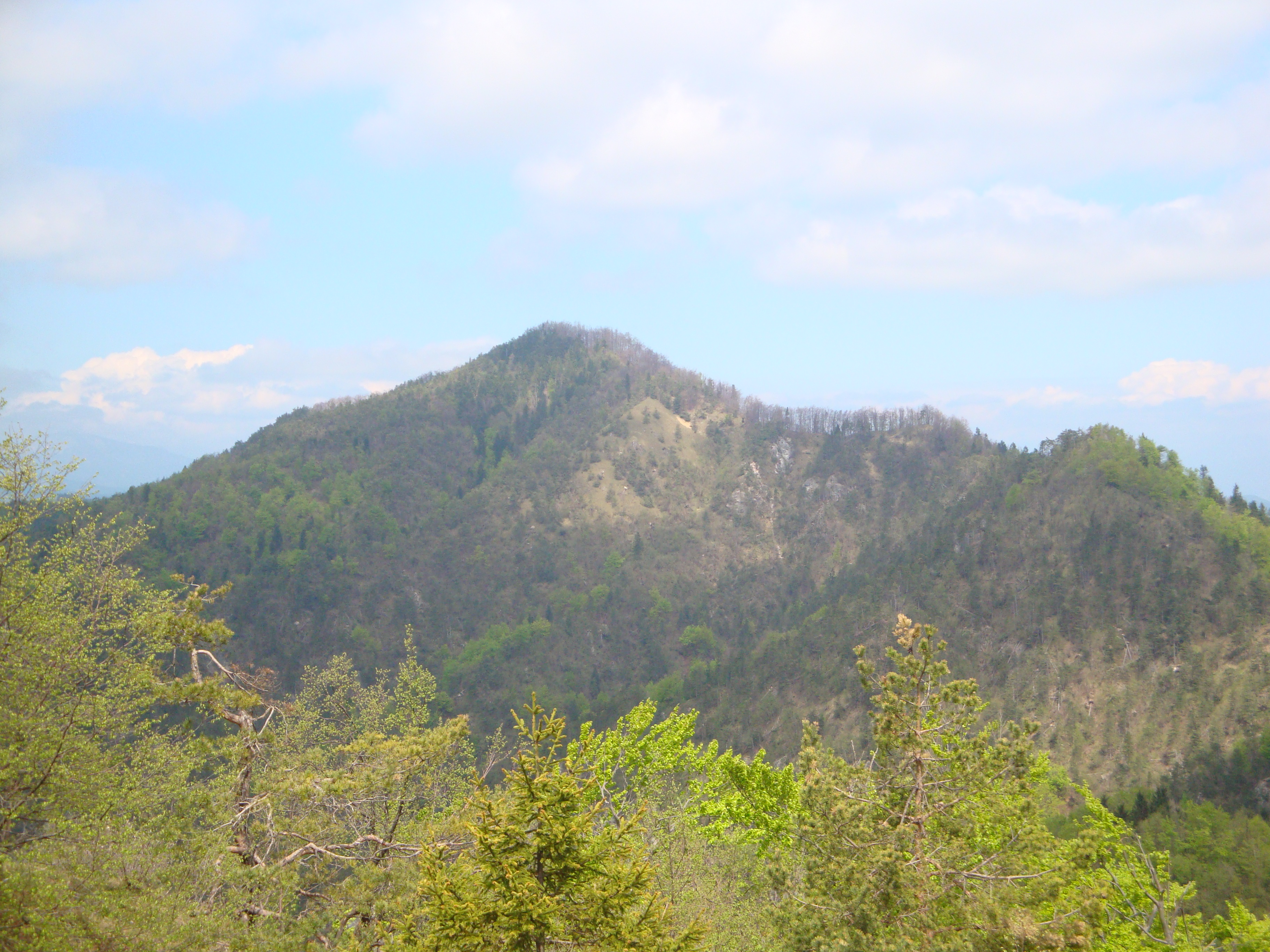
Tošč, the highest peak of the Polhov Gradec Hills

The Polhov Gradec Hills (Slovene: Polhograjsko hribovje, also Polhograjski dolomiti, Polhograjci, and Pograjci) are a pre-Alpine hilly region of northwestern Slovenia. To the north they border the Škofja Loka Hills, and to the south they border the Ljubljana Basin and the Ljubljana Marsh. The largest watercourse is the Gradaščica River. In 1971, a proposal was put forward to protect the region as a nature park.

== Name ==
The hills are named after Polhov Gradec, the central settlement in the range. In German, they were known as the Billichgra(t)zer Gebirge or Billichgra(t)zer Bergen (both based on the German name for Polhov Gradec). Slovene geographers have rejected the Slovene name Polhograjski dolomiti (literally, Polhov Gradec Dolomites) as inappropriate.

== Geography and setting ==
The hills sit on the southeastern margin of the Ljubljana Basin, where steeper relief reflects vigorous tectonic uplift and a dense network of north-east–south-west faults. Slopes often exceed 40° and descend into narrow ravines such as Jevc Ravine above the Little Božna (Slovene: Mala Božna) valley. Numerous weak but permanent springs issue where permeable Middle-Triassic dolomite overlies impervious Permian flint-sandstone; these contacts lie just above valley floors and supply the headwaters of the Gradaščica river system.

== Geology and relief ==
Much of the massif is built of heavily fractured Middle Triassic dolomite—a magnesium-rich carbonate rock that weathers more quickly than adjacent limestones. Overthrusting has left the dolomite riding on softer sandstone, producing a pronounced structural slope that funnels run-off into deep, debris-choked gullies. Field measurements in one 130 m-long gully recorded annual denudation of about 170 tonnes per hectare, an order of magnitude greater than chemical solution (corrosion) rates on nearby plateaux.

Physical weathering dominates the steep, vegetation-poor upper slopes, where freeze–thaw processes and rain-wash loosen blocks that are transported downslope during cloudbursts. Within the colluvium, water normally seeps through coarse debris, but exceptional storms briefly raise the water table, triggering debris flows that can lower the gully floor by half a metre in a single event. Springs emerging along bedding planes and faults typically align with the 50° westerly dip of the dolomite strata, underlining the structural control on local hydrology.

Although corrosion removes only a fraction of the mass lost through slope failure, it sculpts the gentler, clay-mantled hollows and foot-slopes that support meadows and smallholdings. The resulting patchwork of forested scree, grassy clearings and cultivated pockets is characteristic of dolomite terrains throughout western Slovenia, but is particularly well expressed in the Polhov Gradec Hills.

== Population ==
The Polhov Gradec Hills are home to 15,000 residents living in 67 settlements. There are two types of settlements: In the broad parts of the valleys of the Gradaščica and Šujica, there are nucleated villages, whereas elsewhere the predominant type of settlement are solitary farms. The largest settlements are Horjul (1500 residents), Dobrova (1000 residents), and Polhov Gradec (over 600 residents). Through the years, the number of inhabitants in the valley settlements has doubled, while the number of people in the hill settlements has remained similar throughout. A large proportion of the population commutes daily to Ljubljana and other major urban centres.

== Peaks ==
- Tošč (1,021 m or 3,350 ft)
- Pasja Ravan (1,020 m or 3,350 ft)
- Grmada (898 m or 2,946 ft)
- Mount Polhov Gradec (Polhograjska gora), also Mount St. Lawrence (Gora sv. Lovrenca; 824 m or 2,703 ft)
