= St. Stanislaus Institute (Slovenia) =

Educational institution in Ljubljana

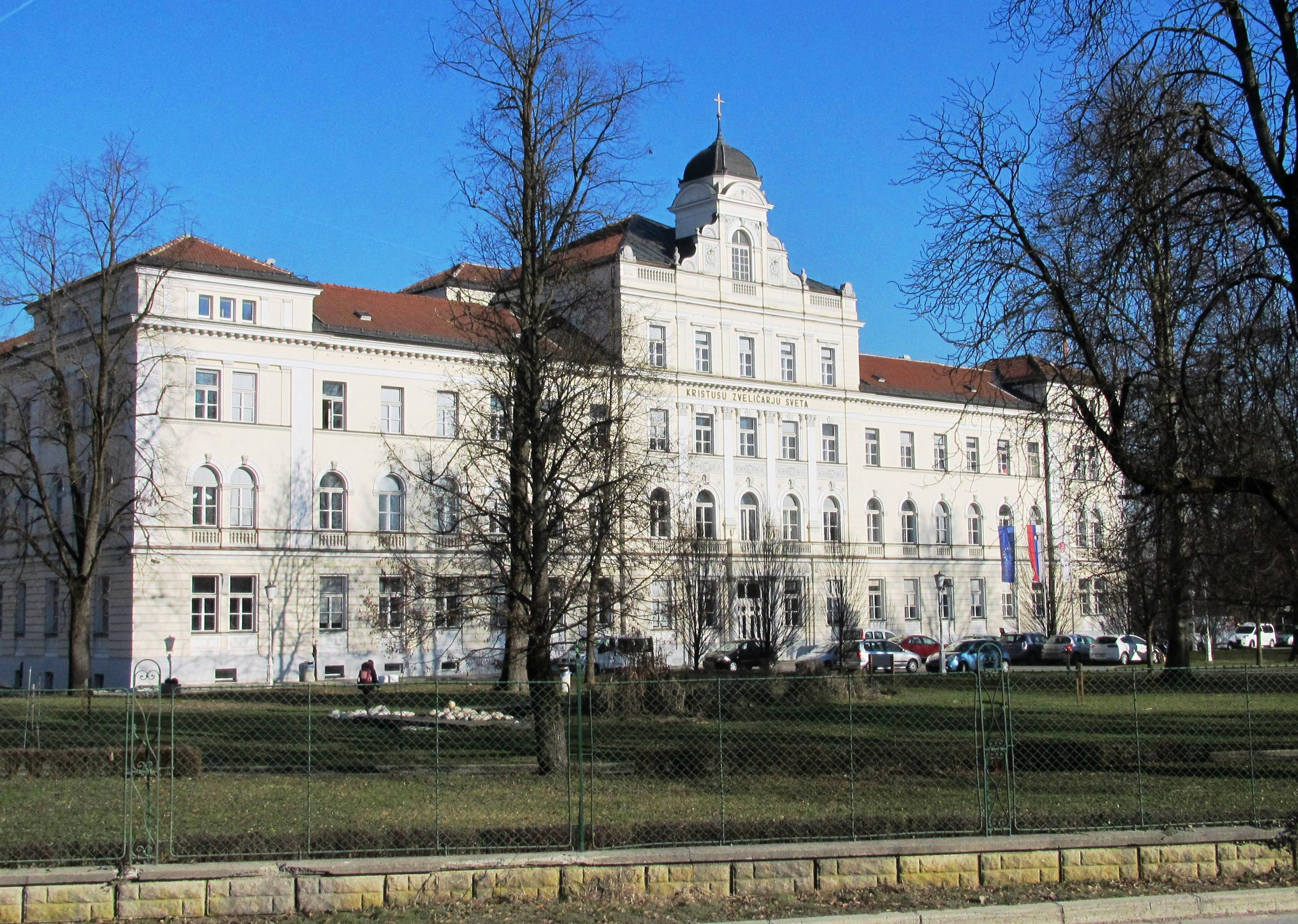
- The St. Stanislaus Institute
- Interactive map of the St. Stanislaus Institute area

General information
- Type: Multi-use
- Location: Štula 23; 1210 Ljubljana Šentvid, Ljubljana, Slovenia
- Coordinates: 46°05′50″N 14°28′18″E
- Construction started: 1901
- Completed: 1905

Technical details
- Floor count: 4

Design and construction
- Architect: Josip Vancaš

The St. Stanislaus Institute (Slovene: Zavod svetega Stanislava) is a Slovenian Roman Catholic educational institution in Šentvid, Ljubljana. Its origins date back to the end of the 19th century, when Ljubljana Bishop Anton Bonaventura Jeglič presented the idea of creating the first fully Slovene-language upper secondary school. After many complications involving the city authorities' refusal to grant permission for construction in the center of the city, on 16 July 1901 Jeglič blessed the newly laid cornerstone of the institute. Construction lasted four years. The bishop blessed the building on 21 September 1905 and it was named after Saint Stanislaus Kostka.

This Slovene-language upper secondary school operated here until 28 April 1941, when the German authorities requisitioned the building. The instructors and students were forced to vacate the entire premises in only three hours. During the war it was used by the Gestapo. After the war, the premises were used as a collection center for captured Slovene Home Guard troops, most of whom were later killed. Some were executed in Šentvid and buried in a mass grave behind the Šentvid cemetery, some were transported to the Kucja Valley and killed there, and some were killed in the forest outside Kočevje.

The building was then turned over to military use. It housed a barracks for the Yugoslav People's Army, which left the building in poor condition when it was vacated in 1991.

After Slovenia became independent in 1991 the property was returned to the Catholic Church. Classes started being held again at the Episcopal Classical Secondary School (Škofijska klasična gimnazija), which is housed by the institute, on 1 September 1993.

In addition to the Episcopal Classical Secondary School, today the St. Stanislaus Institute also houses the Jeglič Dormitory for Boarding Students (Jegličev dijaški dom), the Janez Frančišek Gnidovec Student Residence (Študentski dom Janeza Frančiška Gnidovca), a music school, the Slovenian Center (Slovenski dom), the Good Shepherd Preschool (Vrtec Dobrega pastirja), and Alojzij Šuštar Elementary School (Osnovna šola Alojzija Šuštarja).

The directors of the institute after it was reopened have been Borut Košir from 1993 to 2000, Anton Jamnik from 2000 to 2006, Roman Globokar from 2006 to 2018, and Tone Česen since 2018.
