= Padež =

Padež is name of several settlements:

- in Montenegro:
  - Padež (Kolašin)
- in Serbia:
  - Padež (Kruševac)
  - Padež (Leskovac)
- in Slovenia:
  - Padež, Laško
  - Padež, Vrhnika
  - Padež, Zagorje ob Savi
