= Grič =

Grič most commonly refers to:

- Grič, Zagreb, a central part of the city in Gornji grad

Grič may also refer to:

== Bosnia and Herzegovina ==
- Grič, Kotor Varoš, a settlement in the municipality of Kotor Varoš
- Grič, Donji Vakuf, a settlement in the Municipality of Donji Vakuf

== Croatia ==
- Grič, Zagreb, a central part of the city in Gornji grad
- Grič, Zagreb County, a village in the municipality of Žumberak
- Grič Tunnel (Zagreb), a pedestrian tunnel under the historic core of Zagreb, Croatia
- Grič Tunnel (roadway), a road tunnel, part of the A1 motorway in Croatia

== Slovenia ==
- Beli Grič, a settlement in the Municipality of Mokronog–Trebelno
- Drenov Grič, a settlement in the Municipality of Vrhnika
- Grič, Kostanjevica na Krki, a settlement in the Municipality of Kostanjevica na Krki
- Grič pri Dobličah, a settlement in the Municipality of Črnomelj
- Grič pri Klevevžu, a settlement in the Municipality of Šmarješke Toplice
- Grič pri Trebnjem, a settlement in the Municipality of Trebnje
- Grič, Ribnica, a settlement in the Municipality of Ribnica
- Jerinov Grič, a settlement in the Municipality of Vrhnika
- Starološki Grič, a settlement in the Municipality of Semič
- Trčkov Grič, a settlement in the Municipality of Vrhnika

== See also ==
- Gric (disambiguation)
