= Pokojišče =

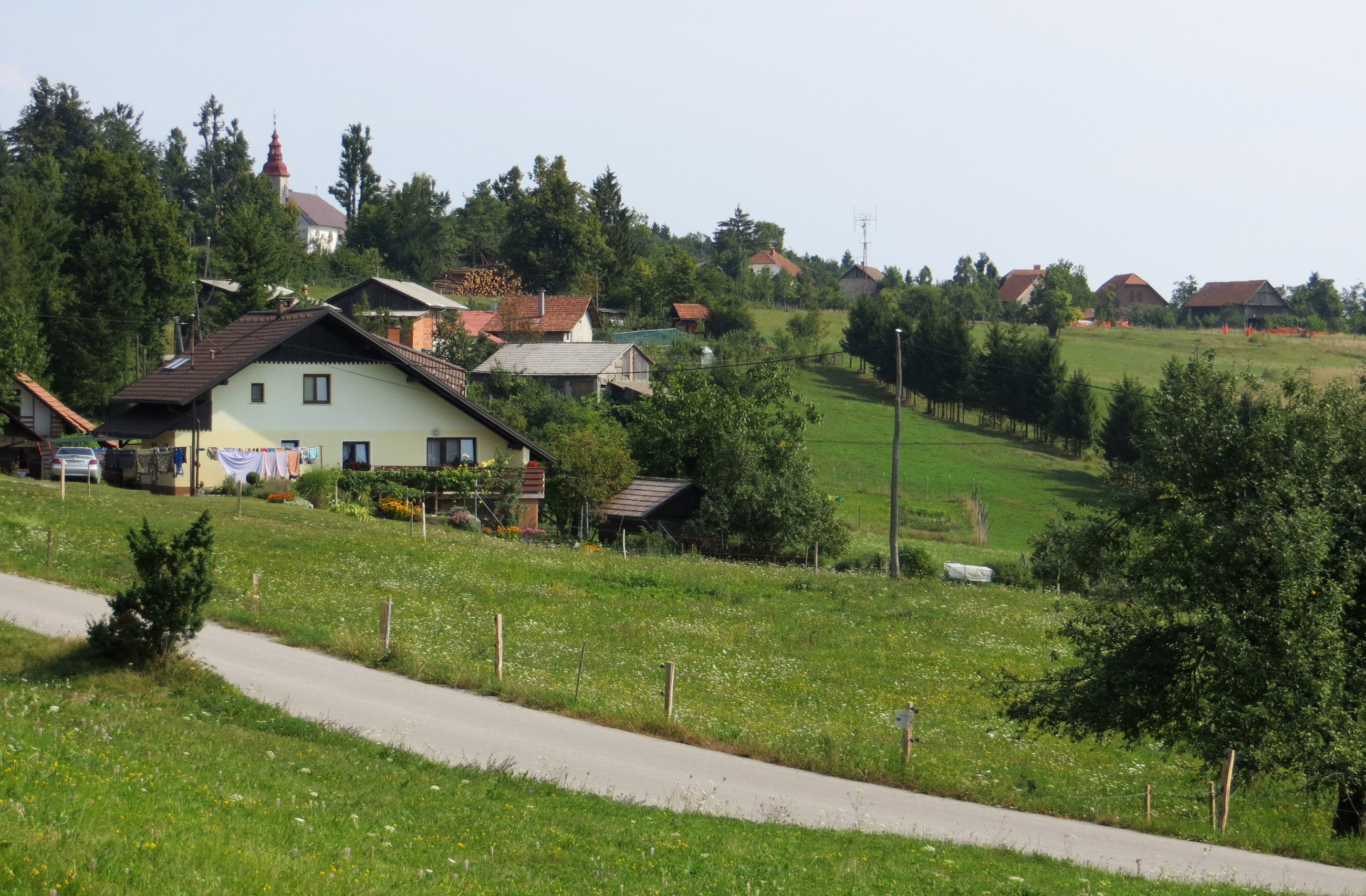

- Location in Slovenia
- Coordinates: 45°53′38.06″N 14°21′19.99″E
- Country: Slovenia
- Traditional region: Inner Carniola
- Statistical region: Central Slovenia
- Municipality: Vrhnika

Area
  - Total: 3 km^{2} (1.2 sq mi)
- Elevation: 728.7 m (2,391 ft)

Population (2014)
  - Total: 14

Pokojišče (pronounced [pɔkɔˈjiːʃtʃɛ]) is a small village in the Municipality of Vrhnika in the Inner Carniola region of Slovenia.

== Geography ==
Pokojišče lies on the karst Menišija Plateau at a point where various routes intersect to Verd, Laze pri Borovnici, Padež, and Cerknica. The land is heavily karstified and there are several caves in the area, including the Cukala Shaft (Cukalovo brezno, 80 meters or 260 feet deep), Kobi Shaft (Kobijevo brezno, 50 meters or 160 feet deep), and Pizdica Shaft (70 meters or 230 feet deep).

== Name ==
Pokojišče was mentioned in written sources in 1763–87 as Pokoinik. The name of the village comes from the common noun pokojišče 'resting place' and refers to the physical location of the village at a level point along the route between Borovnica and the Menišija Plateau, which offered a place for rest during the ascent.

== History ==
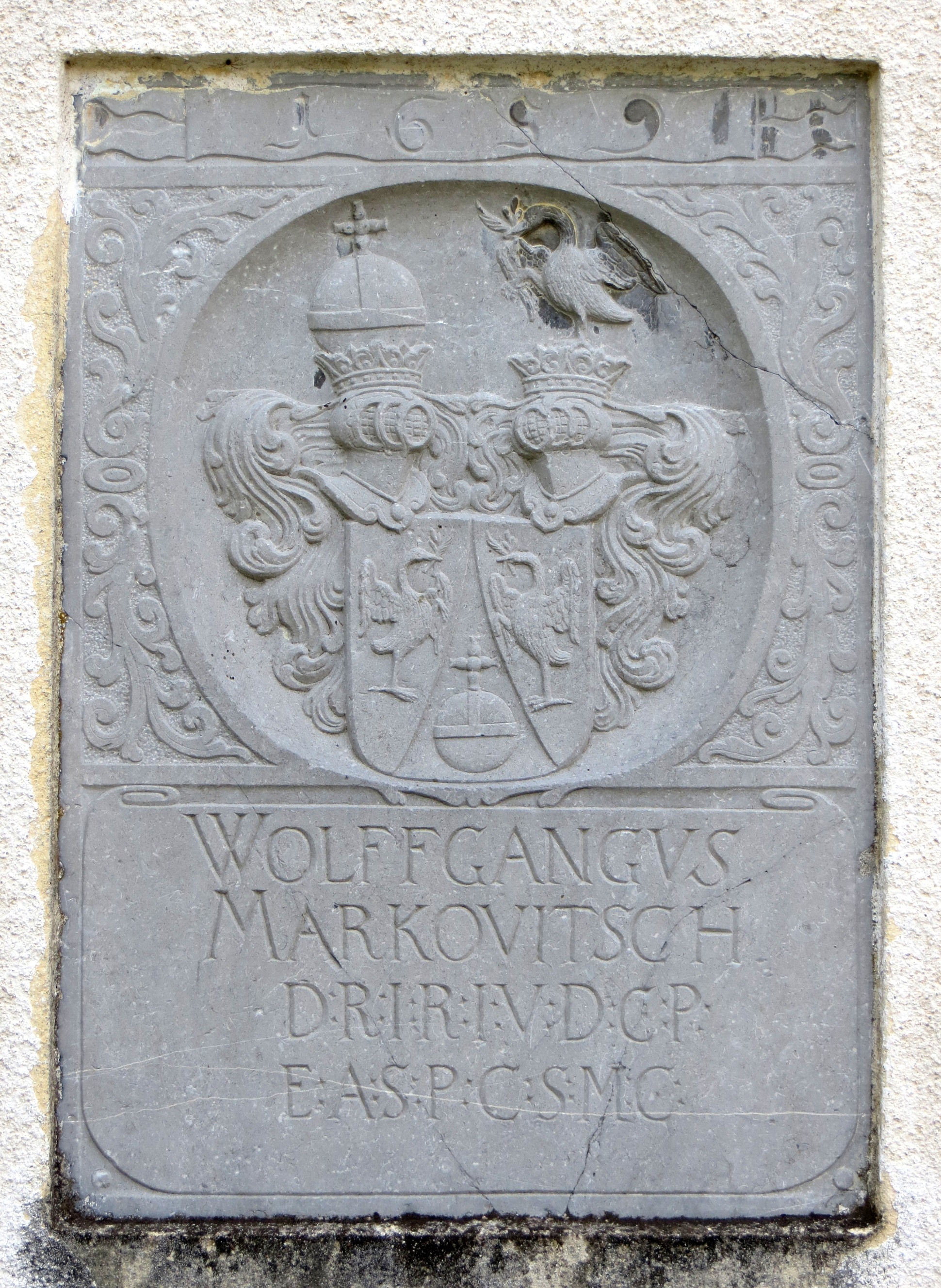
Plaque commemorating Wolfgang Markowitsch

A transport route to Cerknica already passed through Pokojišče in the distant past, traversing land owned by the monastery in Bistra. A house in the village with the estate name Colnar (literally, 'toll collector') is reminiscent of the route, and a plaque bearing the coat of arms of the 17th-century provincial clerk Wolfgang Markowitsch is built into the structure. During the Second World War, on September 26, 1942, Italian forces burned all but the largest house in the village. In June 2010, part of the settlement of Dobec in the Municipality of Cerknica merged with Pokojišče, which increased its area by 1 square kilometer (0.39 sq mi).

=== Mass grave ===
The Cukala Shaft Mass Grave (Grobišče Cukalovo brezno) is located about 2 kilometers (1.2 mi) west of the village. It contains the remains of undetermined victims; spelunkers found a human skull in the cave.

== Church ==
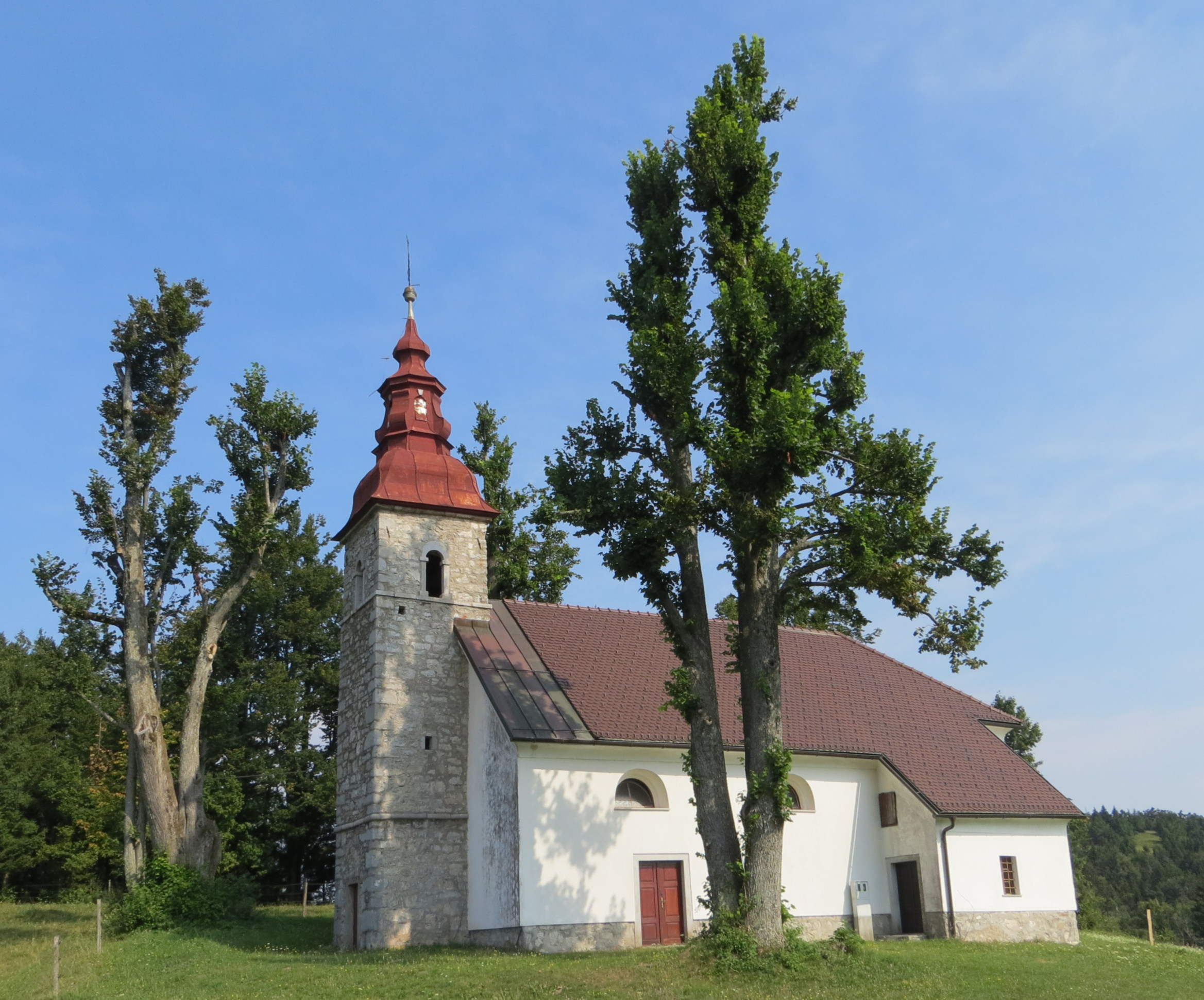
Saint Stephen's Church

The local church in the settlement is dedicated to Saint Stephen and belongs to the Parish of Borovnica. It dates from the beginning of the 17th century.

== Nature ==
Lepidoptera include Zygaena lonicerae.
