= Trčkov Grič =

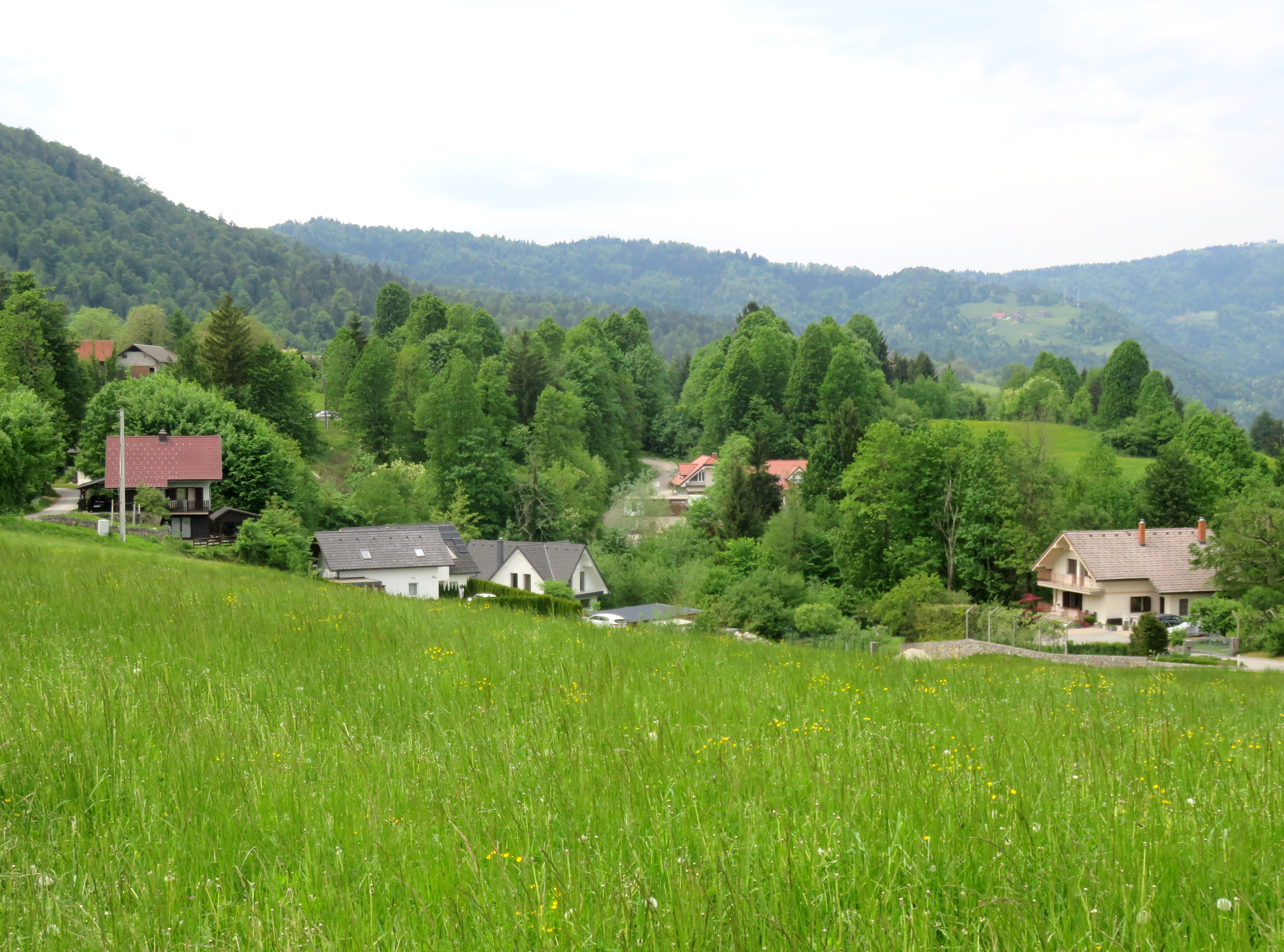

- Location in Slovenia
- Coordinates: 45°59′18.52″N 14°14′20.16″E
- Country: Slovenia
- Traditional region: Inner Carniola
- Statistical region: Central Slovenia
- Municipality: Vrhnika

Area
  - Total: 1.22 km^{2} (0.47 sq mi)
- Elevation: 463.7 m (1,521 ft)

Trčkov Grič (pronounced [ˈtəɾtʃkɔu̯ ˈɡɾiːtʃ]) is a small settlement in the hills northwest of Stara Vrhnika in the Municipality of Vrhnika in the Inner Carniola region of Slovenia.

== Name ==
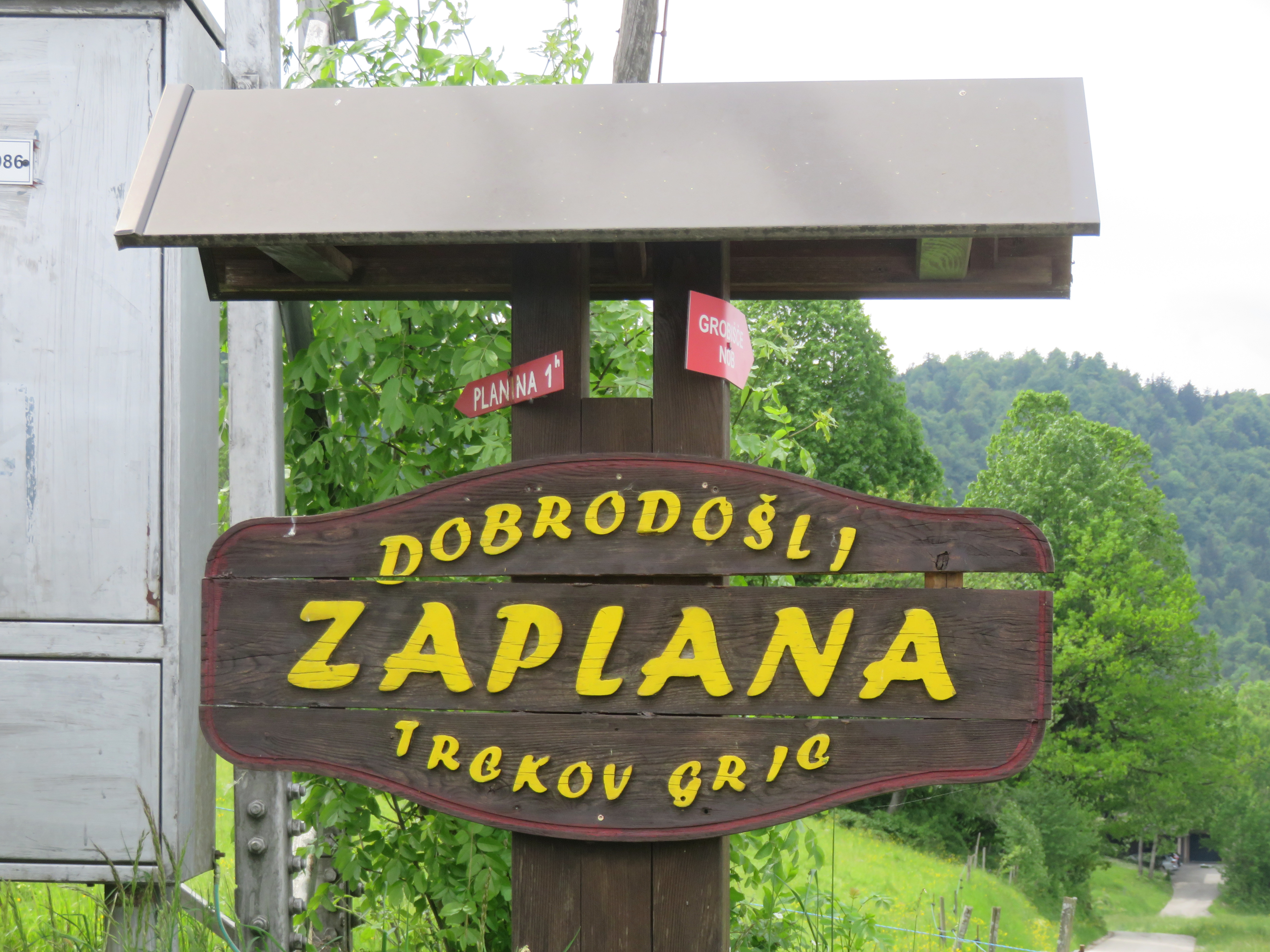
Sign for Trčkov Grič

The name Trčkov Grič literally means 'Trček's hill'. The former hamlet that Trčkov Grič is centered around is called Trčkov Hrib (literally also 'Trček's hill'). Both names refer to the Trček farm, which is located in the southern part of the settlement.

== History ==
Trčkov Grič became a separate settlement in 2002, when it was separated from the settlement of Zaplana. It was also previously a hamlet of Podlipa.
