= Dobec =

- Village
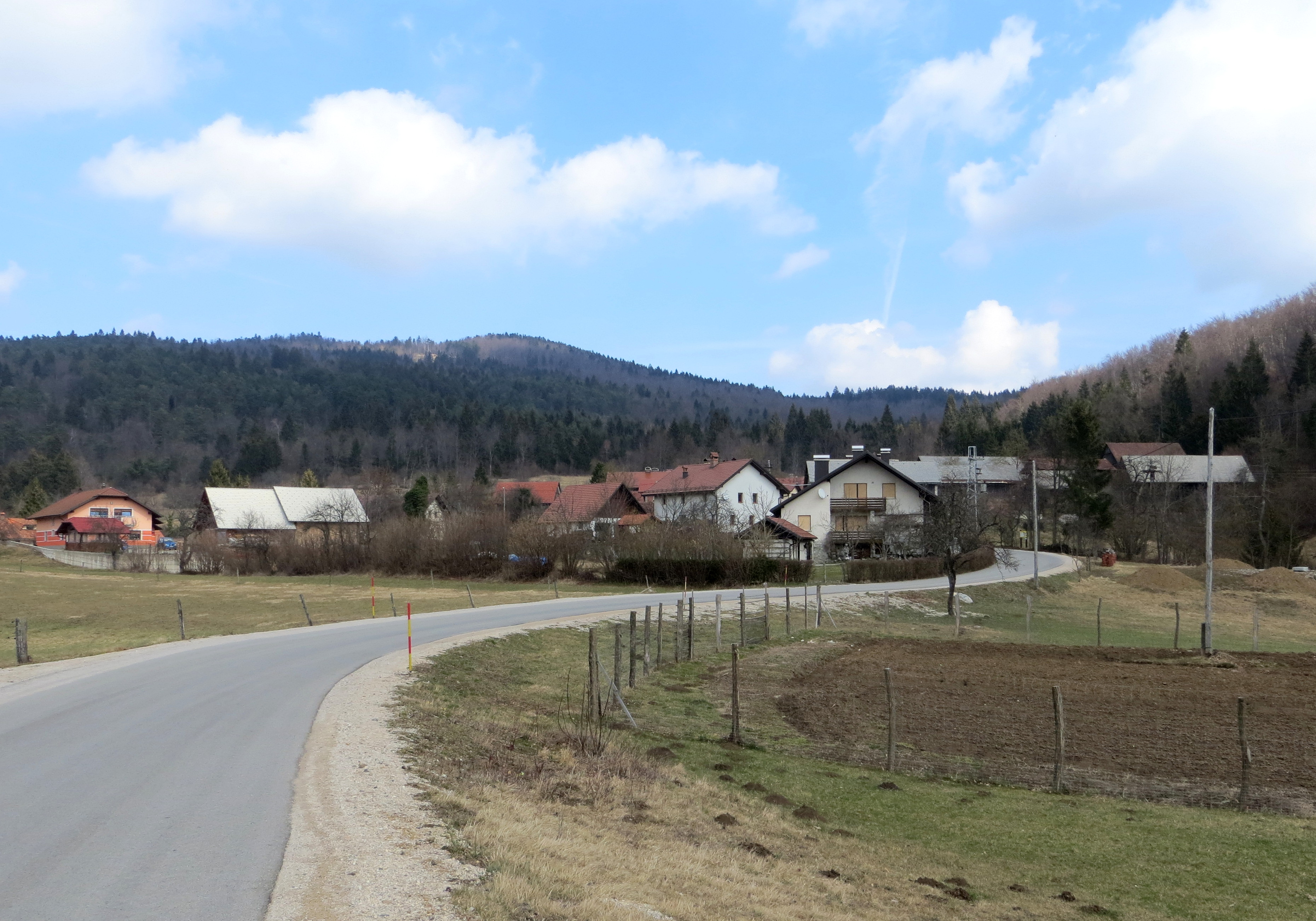

- Location in Slovenia
- Coordinates: 45°50′53.01″N 14°21′47.85″E
- Country: Slovenia
- Traditional region: Inner Carniola
- Statistical region: Littoral–Inner Carniola
- Municipality: Cerknica

Area
  - Total: 18.7 km^{2} (7.2 sq mi)
- Elevation: 700.3 m (2,298 ft)

Population (2020)
  - Total: 66
  - Density: 3.5/km^{2} (9.1/sq mi)

Dobec (pronounced [ˈdoːbəts]) is a small village in the hills north of Begunje in the Municipality of Cerknica in the Inner Carniola region of Slovenia.

== History ==
Dobec was first mentioned in 1262, and again in 1292, as a property belonging to the Carthusian monastery in Bistra.

In June 2005, part of the settlement ceded from Dobec and merged with the settlement of Pokojišče in the Municipality of Vrhnika.

=== Mass graves ===
Dobec is the site of two known mass graves associated with the Second World War. They are located northwest of the settlement in the Ravnik Valley. The Mihec Shaft Mass Grave (Slovene: Grobišče Mihcovo brezno) is also known as the Matjaž Shaft Mass Grave (Grobišče Matjaževo brezno). It is believed to have contained the remains of three locals that were murdered because of their opposition to the Yugoslav Partisan movement. The local villagers removed the remains before May 1991. The Vodišek Shaft Mass Grave (Grobišče Vodiško brezno) is 20 meters (66 ft) deep, with its entrance at the bottom of a sinkhole. Human remains are located on two shelves in the shaft and the floor of the shaft. The victims were people from nearby villages that were ambushed and murdered.

== Church ==
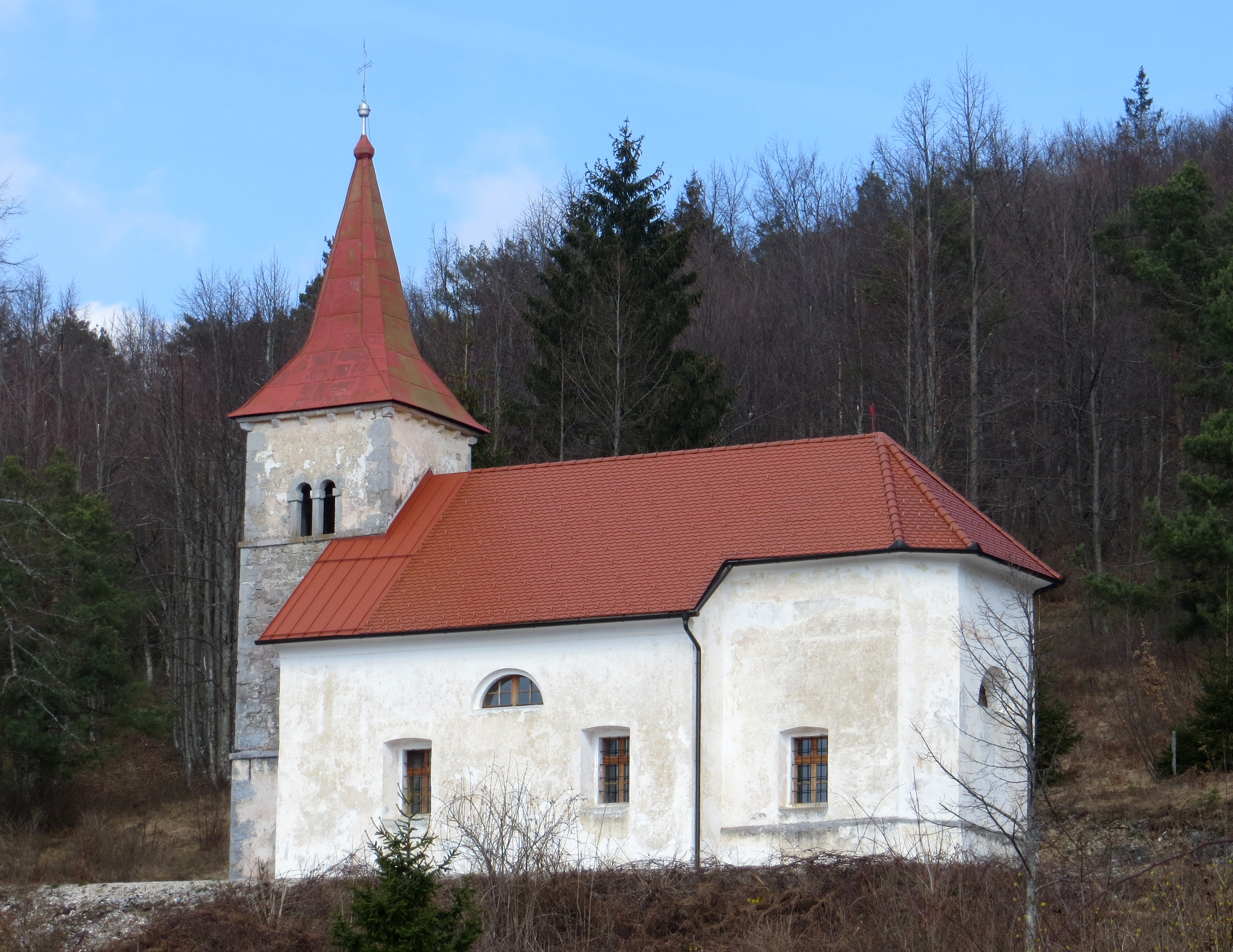
Saint Leonard's Church

The local church, built outside the settlement to the north, is dedicated to Saint Leonard and belongs to the Parish of Begunje pri Cerknici. The church was first recorded in written sources in 1322.
