= Lesno Brdo, Vrhnika =

Lesno Brdo
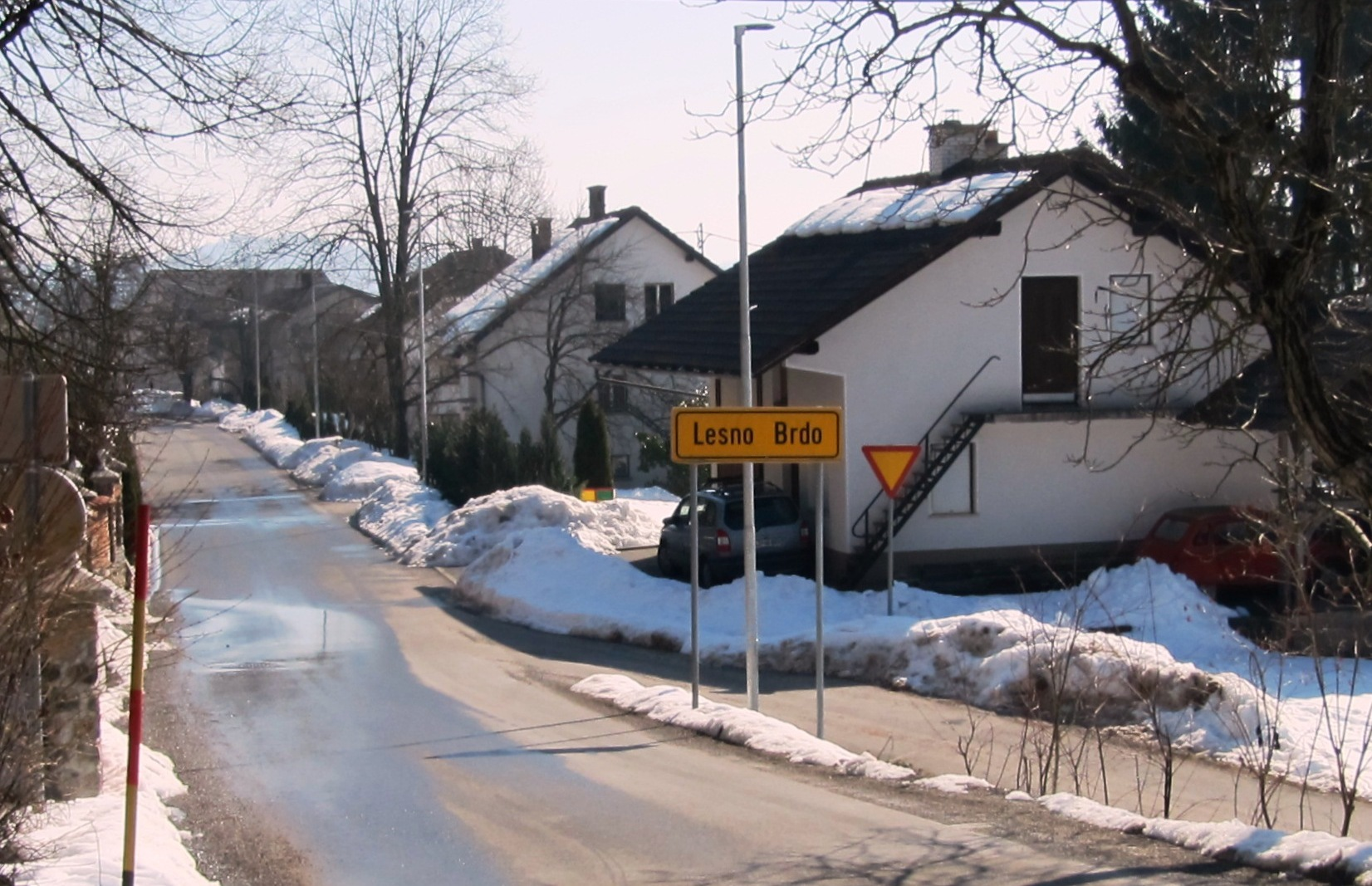

- Location in Slovenia
- Coordinates: 46°0′14.49″N 14°20′14.98″E
- Country: Slovenia
- Traditional region: Inner Carniola
- Statistical region: Central Slovenia
- Municipality: Vrhnika

Area
  - Total: 2.03 km^{2} (0.78 sq mi)
- Elevation: 299.9 m (984 ft)

Population (2002)
  - Total: 279

Lesno Brdo (pronounced [ˈleːsnɔ ˈbəɾdɔ]; German: Hölzenegg) in the Municipality of Vrhnika in Slovenia is a continuation of the settlement of Lesno Brdo in the neighbouring Municipality of Horjul. Because it belongs to a different municipality, its population and administrative statistics are always stated separately.

Lesno Brdo is best known for its red limestone quarries.
