= Mirke =

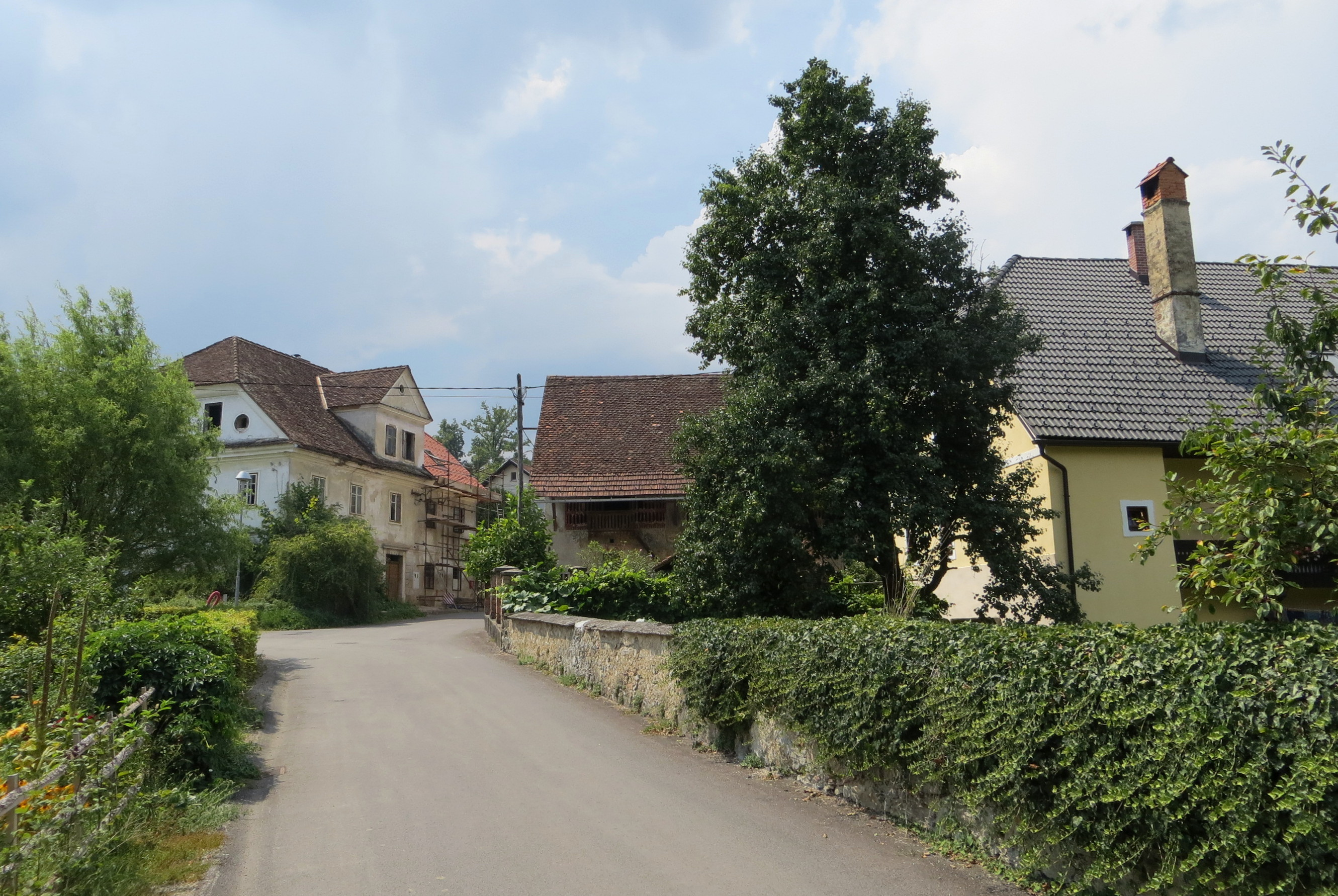

- Location in Slovenia
- Coordinates: 45°57′24.2″N 14°17′46.53″E
- Country: Slovenia
- Traditional region: Inner Carniola
- Statistical region: Central Slovenia
- Municipality: Vrhnika

Area
  - Total: 9.31 km^{2} (3.59 sq mi)
- Elevation: 297.2 m (975 ft)

Population (2002)
  - Total: 101

Mirke (pronounced [ˈmiːɾkɛ]) is a small settlement immediately south of Vrhnika in the Inner Carniola region of Slovenia.
