= Zavrh pri Borovnici =

Zavrh pri Borovnici Zavrh (until 1953)
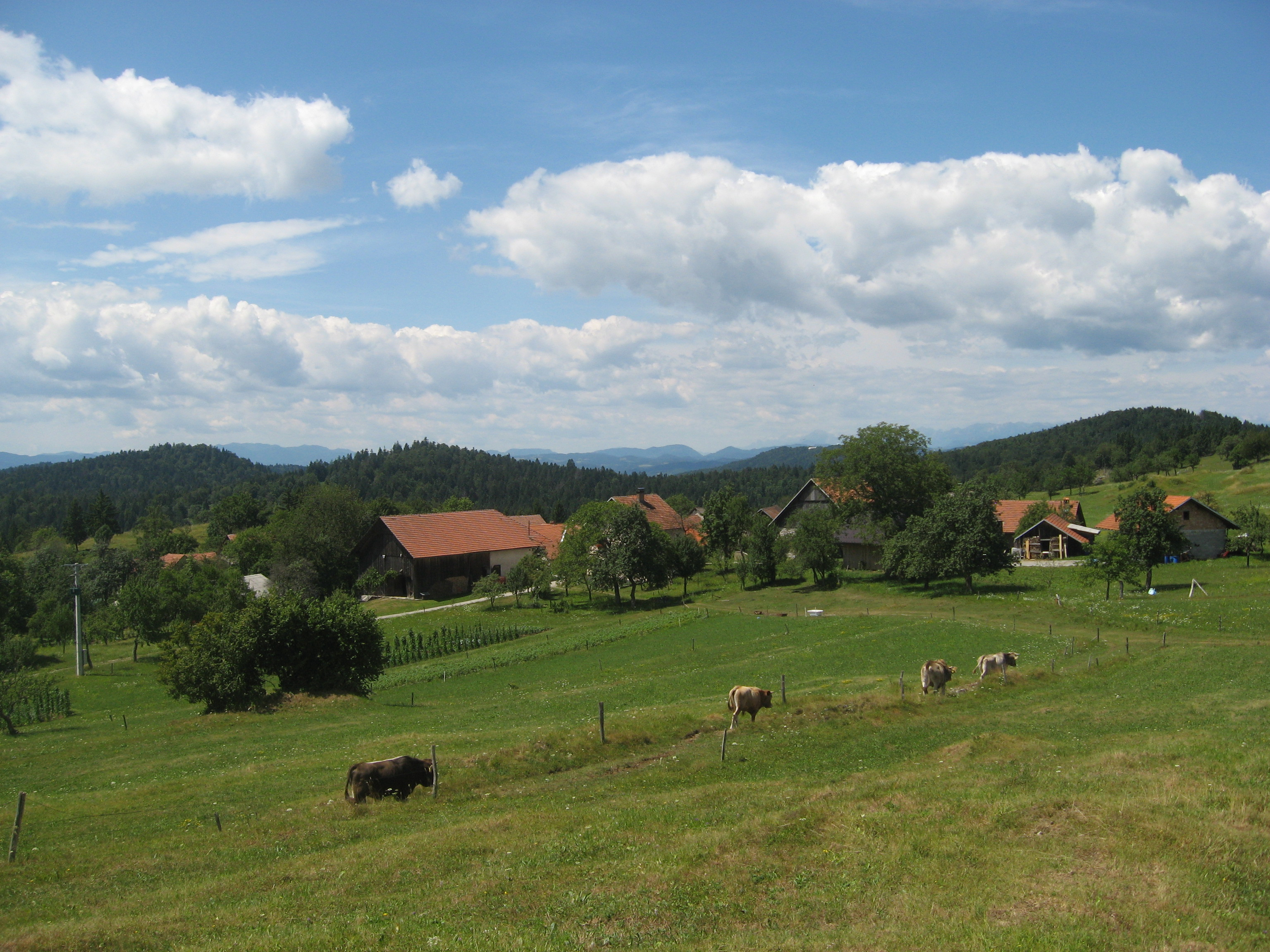

- Location in Slovenia
- Coordinates: 45°54′5.47″N 14°20′59.26″E
- Country: Slovenia
- Traditional region: Inner Carniola
- Statistical region: Central Slovenia
- Municipality: Vrhnika

Area
  - Total: 11.61 km^{2} (4.48 sq mi)
- Elevation: 764.5 m (2,508 ft)

Population (2002)
  - Total: 36

Zavrh pri Borovnici (pronounced [zaˈʋəɾx pɾi bɔɾɔwˈnìːtsi]) is a small dispersed settlement in the hills above Borovnica in the Inner Carniola region of Slovenia. It belongs to the Municipality of Vrhnika.

== Name ==
The name of the settlement was changed from Zavrh to Zavrh pri Borovnici in 1953.
