= Mala Ligojna =

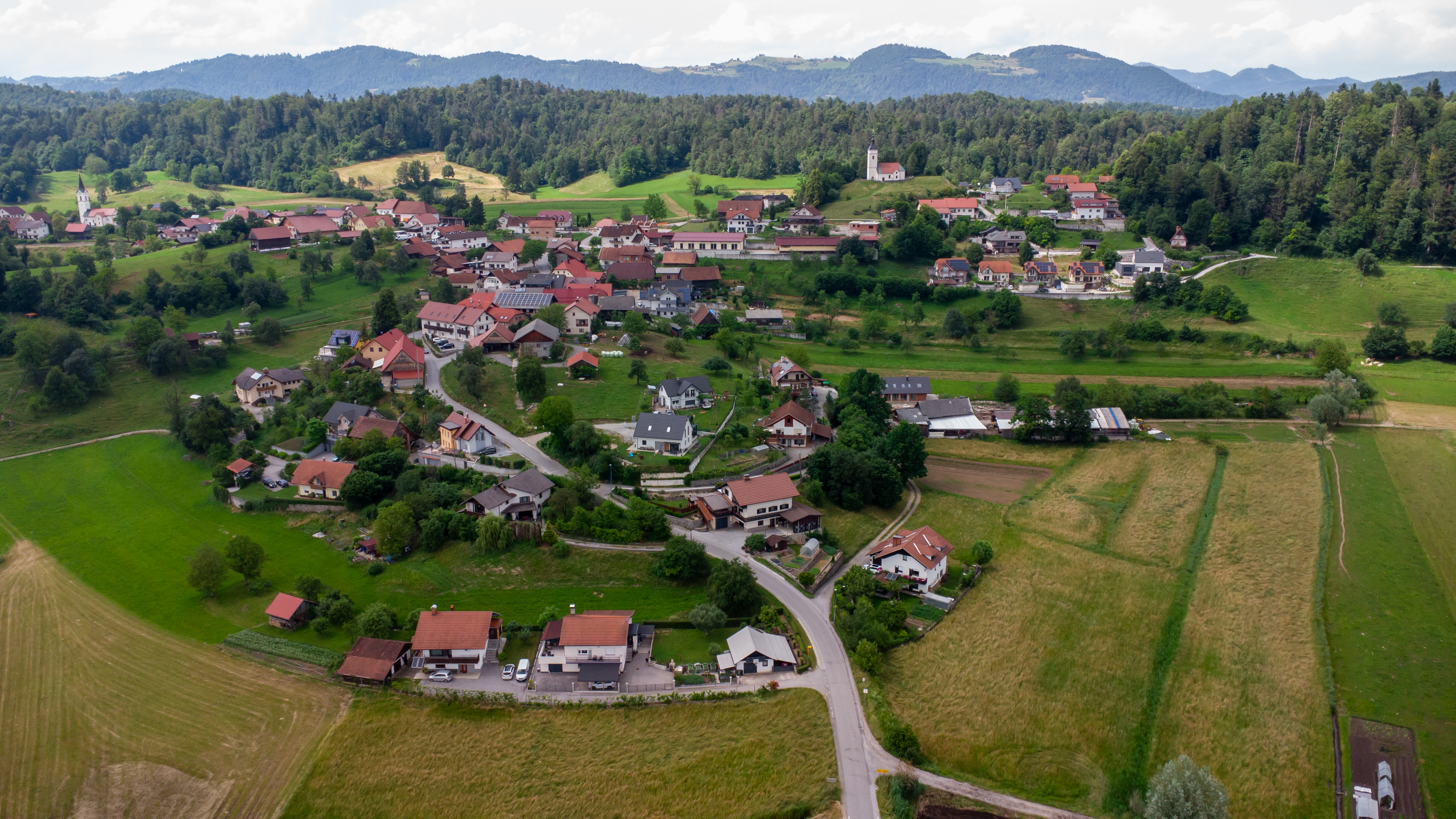

- Location in Slovenia
- Coordinates: 45°59′39.79″N 14°18′17.82″E
- Country: Slovenia
- Traditional region: Inner Carniola
- Statistical region: Central Slovenia
- Municipality: Vrhnika

Area
  - Total: 2.42 km^{2} (0.93 sq mi)
- Elevation: 337.6 m (1,108 ft)

Population (2002)
  - Total: 120

Mala Ligojna (pronounced [ˈmaːla liˈɡoːi̯na]; German: Kleinligoina) is a village north of Vrhnika in the Inner Carniola region of Slovenia. It includes the hamlet of Frtica (in older sources also Na Fortici).

== Name ==
Together with neighboring Velika Ligojna (literally 'Big Ligojna'), Mala Ligojna (literally, 'Little Ligojna') was attested in written sources in 1309 as Luckossel (and as Lucozel in 1317, Lvkozel in 1318, and Oberludigoni in 1526). The medieval attestations indicate that the name was Luko(va) sela (literally, 'Luka's village') in the 14th century, probably originally based on the name *Ľudigojь and then confused in the transcriptions with the similar name Luka. If so, today's name is a result of the sound change ľu- > li- and modern vowel reduction, and means 'Ljudigoj's village'.

== Church ==
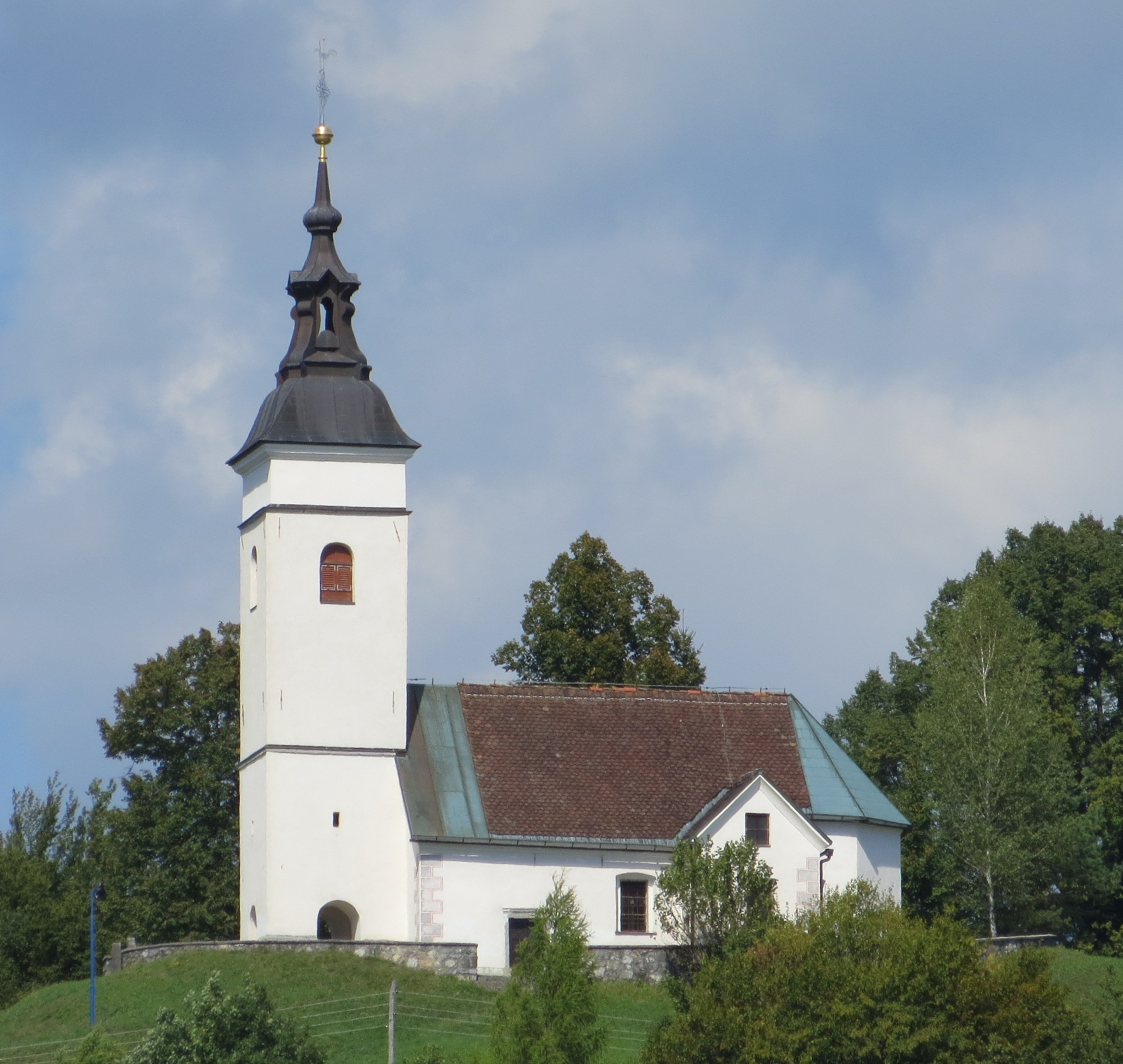
Saint Leonard's Church

The local church in the settlement is dedicated to Saint Leonard and belongs to the Parish of Vrhnika. The church dates from 1567 and was remodeled in the Baroque style in the 18th century.
