= Jamnik, Vrhnika =

Jamnik
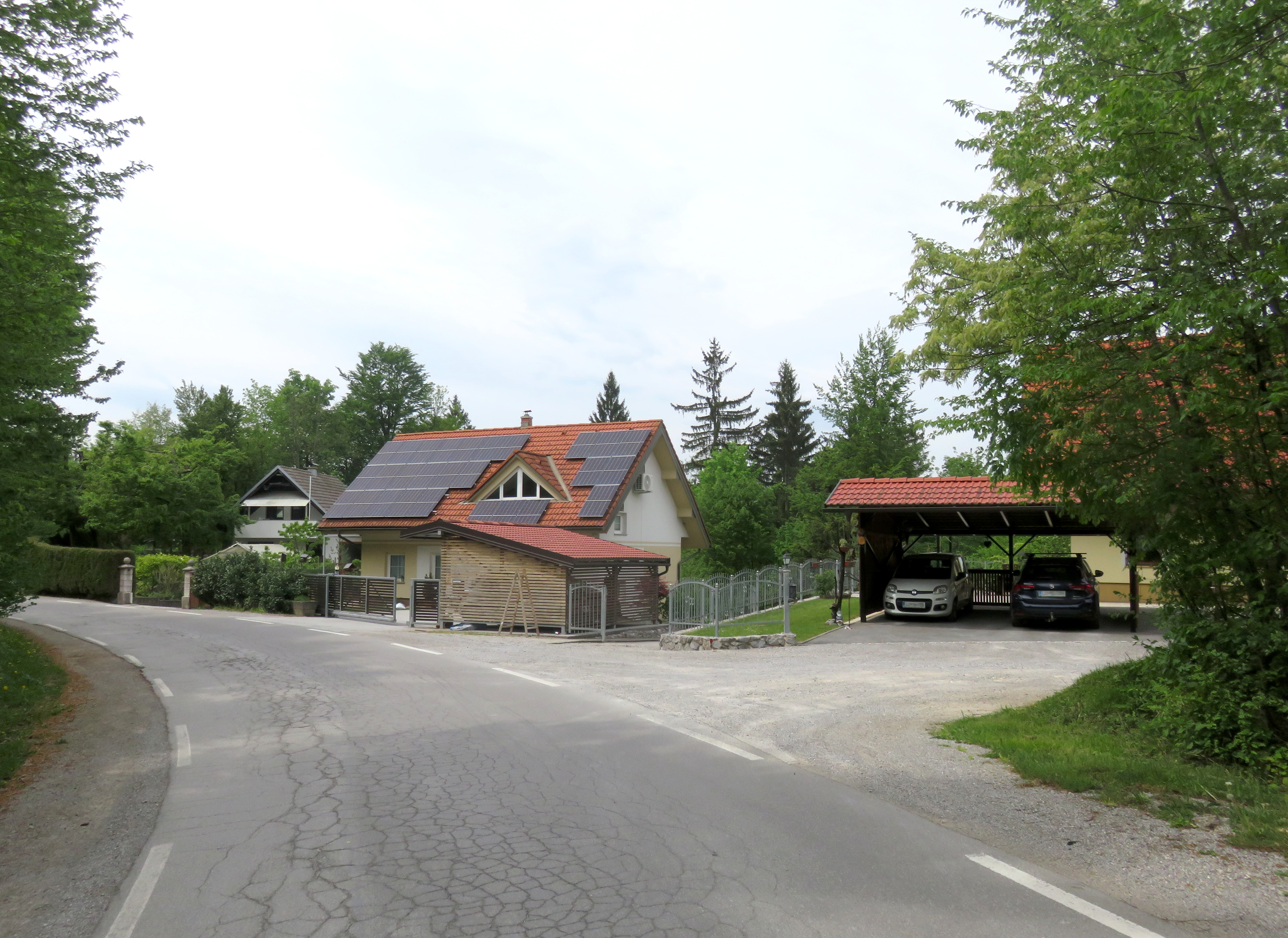

- Location in Slovenia
- Coordinates: 45°58′49.09″N 14°14′27.53″E
- Country: Slovenia
- Traditional region: Inner Carniola
- Statistical region: Central Slovenia
- Municipality: Vrhnika

Area
  - Total: 0.52 km^{2} (0.20 sq mi)
- Elevation: 631 m (2,070 ft)

Jamnik (pronounced [ˈjaːmnik]) is a small settlement in the hills west of Vrhnika in the Inner Carniola region of Slovenia.

== Name ==
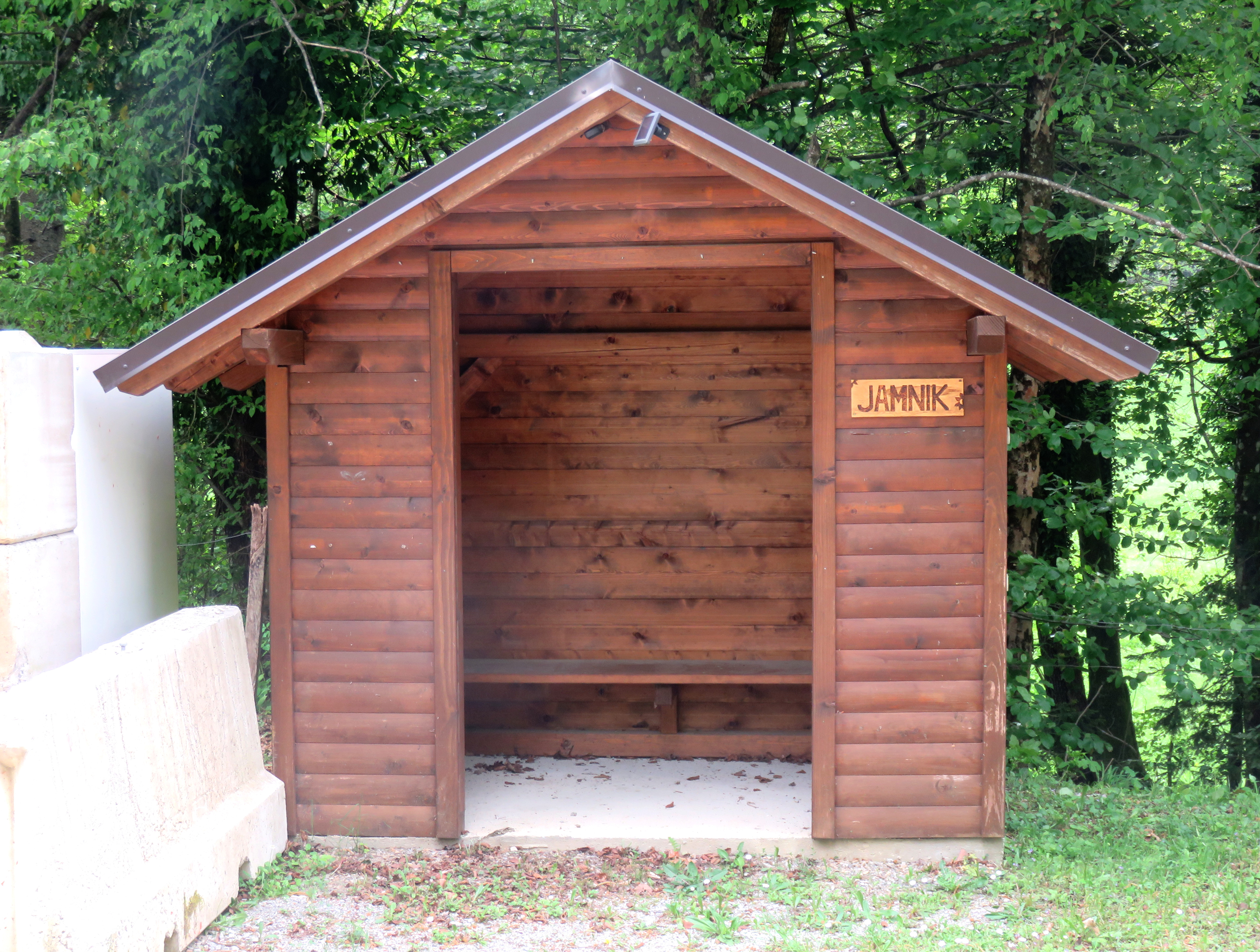
Bus stop labeled for Jamnik

The name Jamnik is found for various locations in Slovenia. It is derived from the common noun jama 'cave, pit', originally referring to a farm located near such a landscape element.

== History ==
Jamnik became a separate settlement in 2002, when its territory was administratively separated from Zaplana.
