= Mizni Dol =

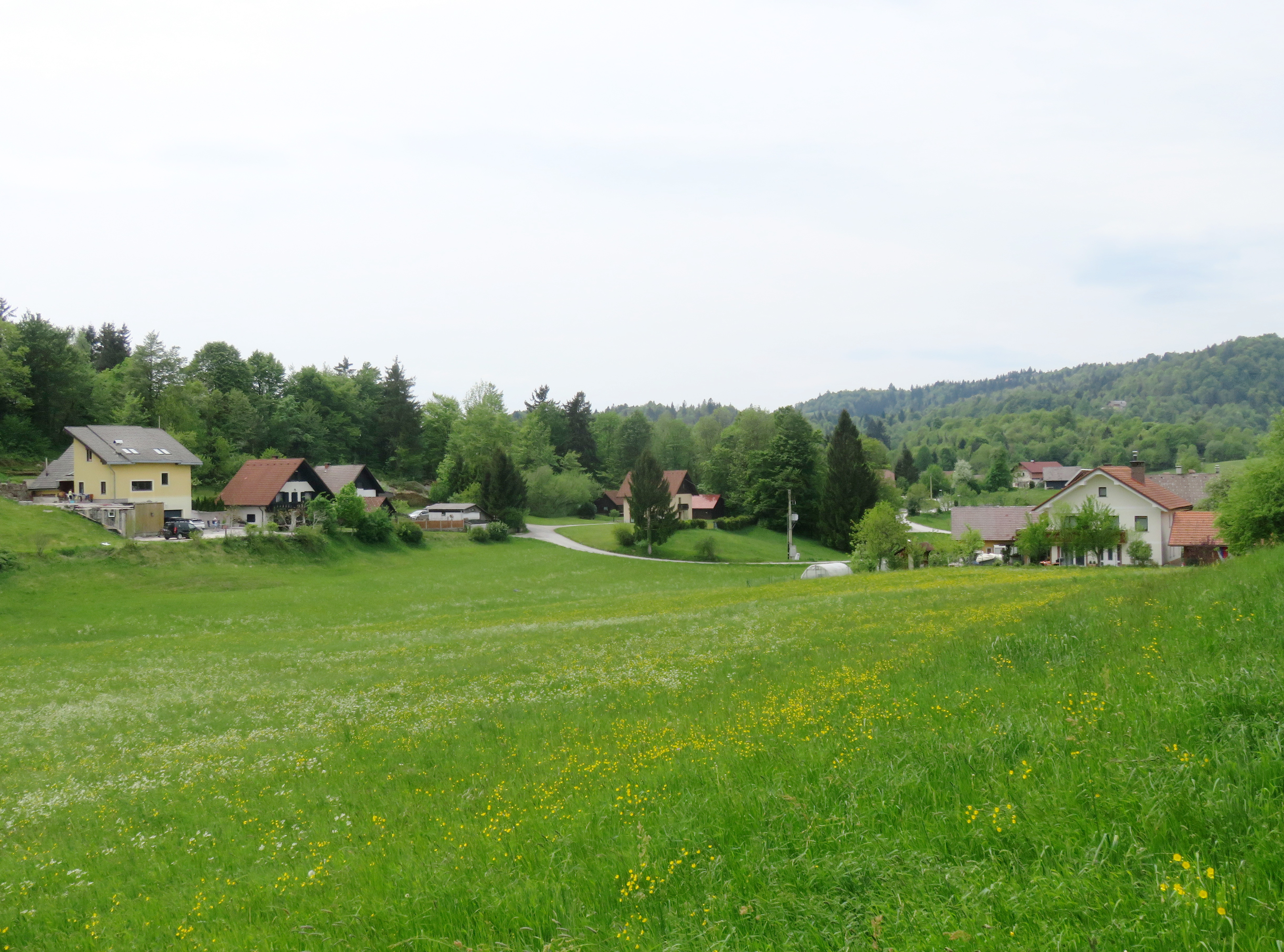

- Location in Slovenia
- Coordinates: 45°58′50.06″N 14°13′39.2″E
- Country: Slovenia
- Traditional region: Inner Carniola
- Statistical region: Central Slovenia
- Municipality: Vrhnika
- Founded: 2002

Area
  - Total: 2.37 km^{2} (0.92 sq mi)
- Elevation: 617.7 m (2,027 ft)

Population (2010)
  - Total: 167
  - Density: 70.5/km^{2} (183/sq mi)

Mizni Dol (pronounced [ˈmiːzni ˈdoːu̯]) is a small settlement in the hills west of Vrhnika in the Inner Carniola region of Slovenia.

== Name ==
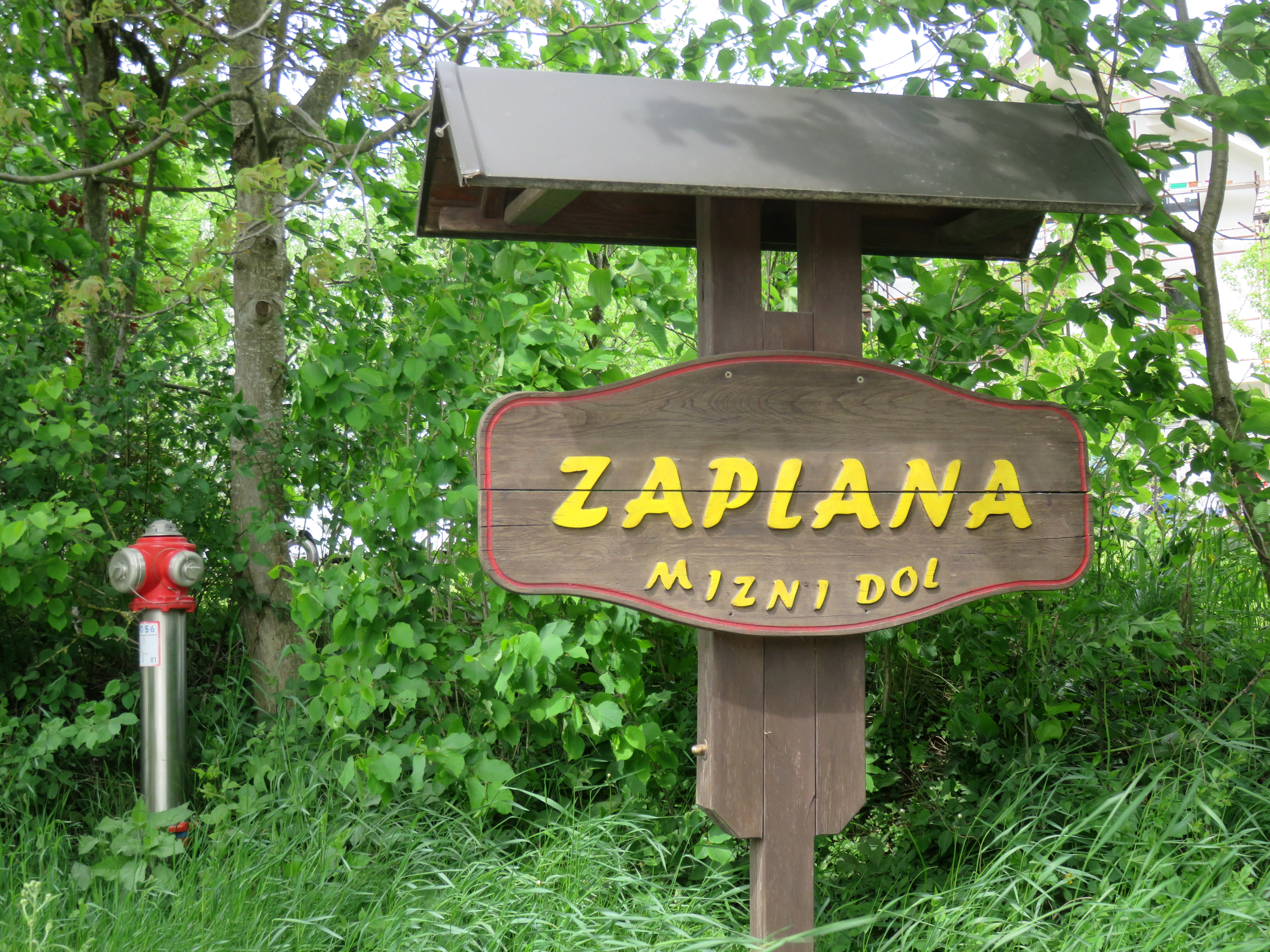
Sign for Mizni Dol

The former hamlet that Mizni Dol is centered around is called Mizendol. The name—literally 'table valley'—is a compound. The first part is derived from the common noun miza 'table', and the second part, dol, refers to a depression or (dry) valley. Mizni Dol is located in a relatively flat dry valley.

== History ==
The independent settlement of Mizni Dol was created in 2002, when the territory was separated from the settlement of Zaplana. Prior to this, Mizni Dol was a hamlet of Zaplana.
