= Strmica, Vrhnika =

Strmica
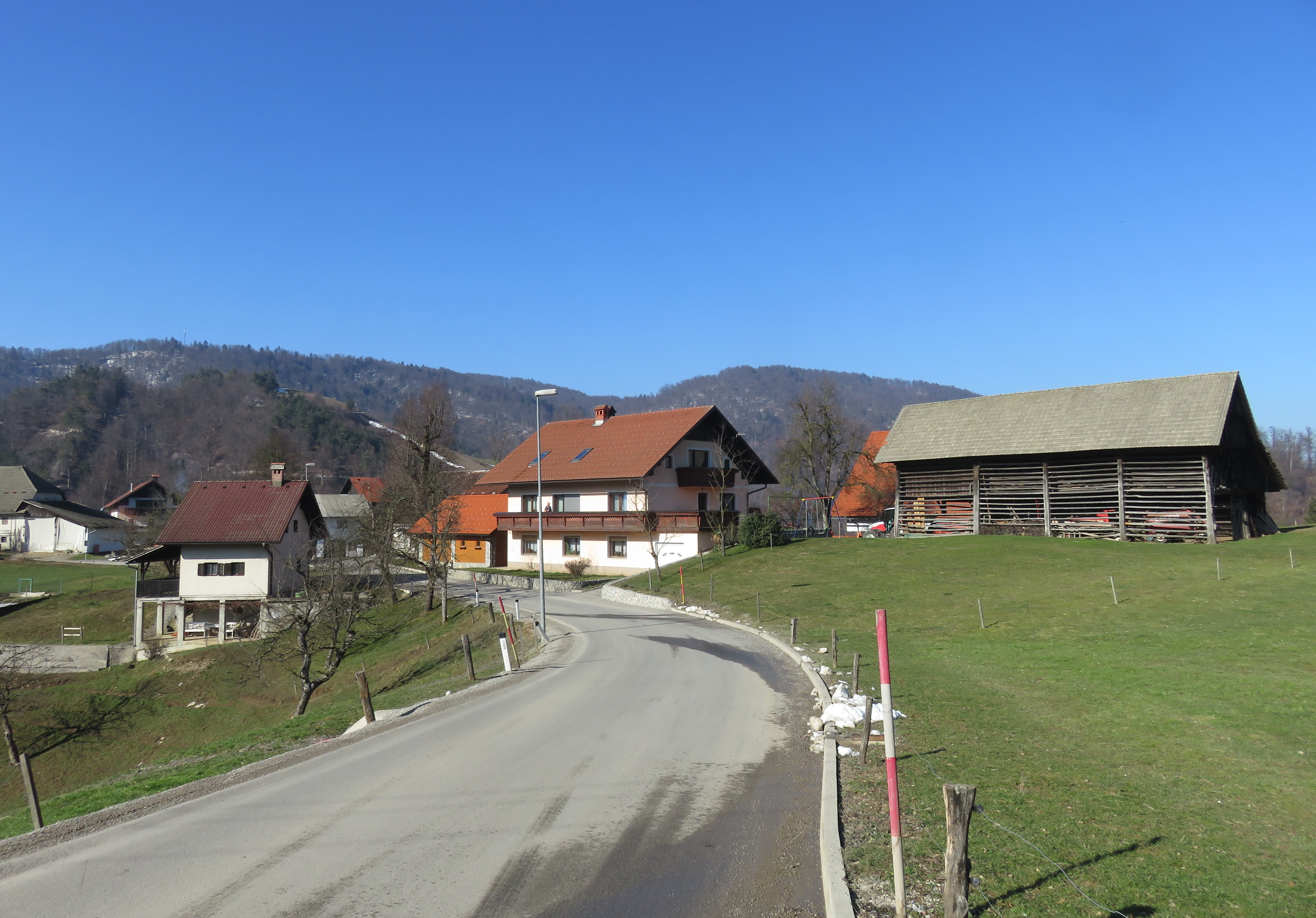

- Location in Slovenia
- Coordinates: 45°57′6.42″N 14°16′12.86″E
- Country: Slovenia
- Traditional region: Inner Carniola
- Statistical region: Central Slovenia
- Municipality: Vrhnika

Area
  - Total: 2.68 km^{2} (1.03 sq mi)
- Elevation: 483.3 m (1,586 ft)

Strmica (pronounced [ˈstəɾmitsa]) is a small settlement in the hills west of Vrhnika in the Inner Carniola region of Slovenia.

== Name ==
The name Strmica was originally an oronym referring to Strmica Hill (626 m) southwest of the settlement. It probably originally had the form *Strьma(ja) gora (literally, 'steep mountain') and was later univerbized to Strmica (literally, 'the steep one').

== History ==
Strmica was administratively separated from Zaplana in 2002 and made an independent settlement. Further adjustments were made to the boundaries of the settlement in 2016.

=== Mass grave ===
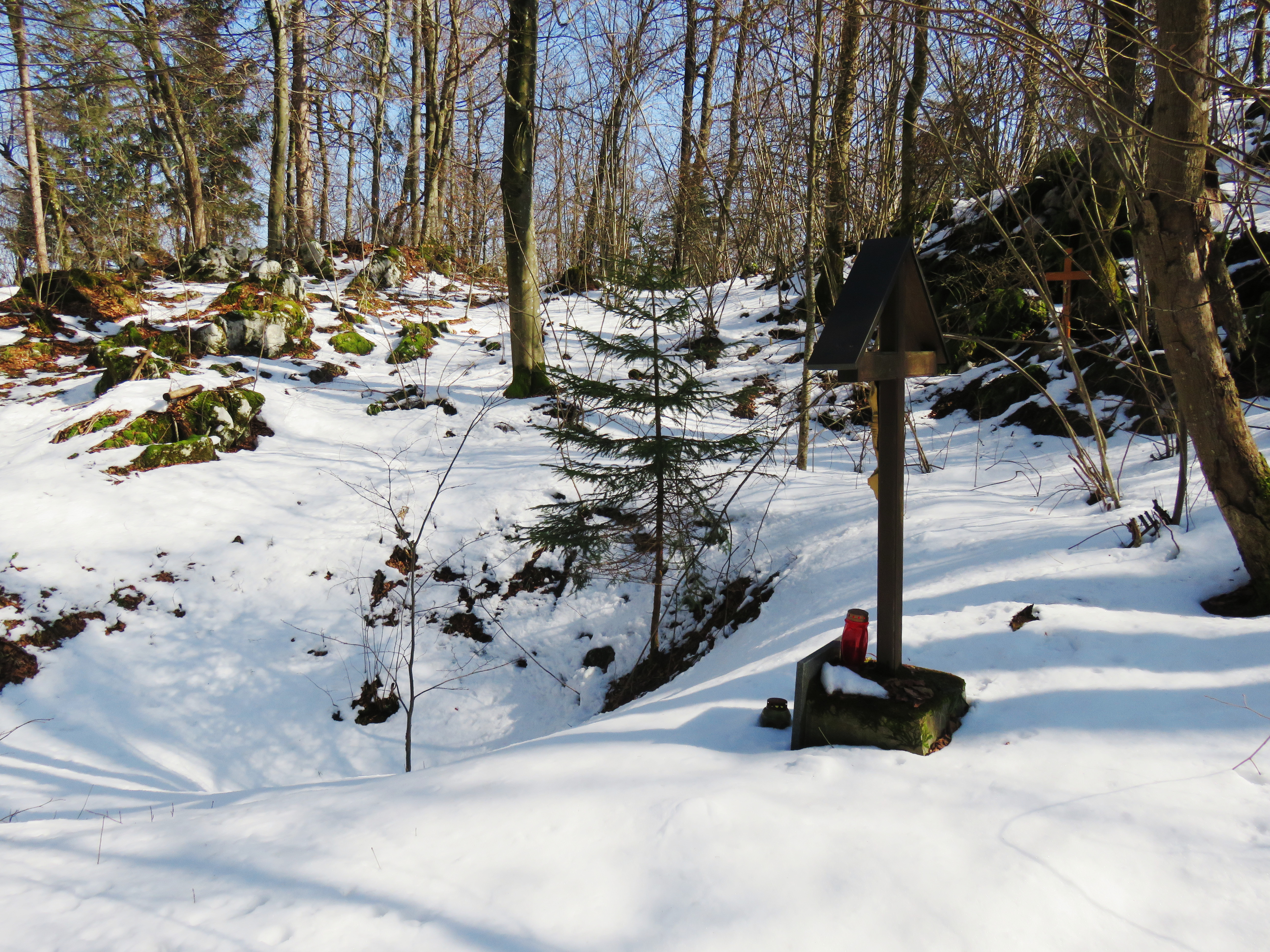
Strmica Mass Grave

Strmica is the site of a mass grave from the period immediately after the Second World War. The Strmica Mass Grave (Slovene: Grobišče pod Strmico), also known as the Zakovšek Woods below Strmica Mass Grave (Grobišče v Zakovškem gozdu pod Strmco), is located southwest of the settlement, at an abandoned lime kiln in a sinkhole next to a dirt road on the southeast slope of Strmica Hill. The grave contained the remains of 12 young men from Logatec or Rovte that were murdered on June 21, 1945. The remains were exhumed in 1991 and are now at the Institute of Forensic Medicine in Ljubljana.

== Cultural heritage ==
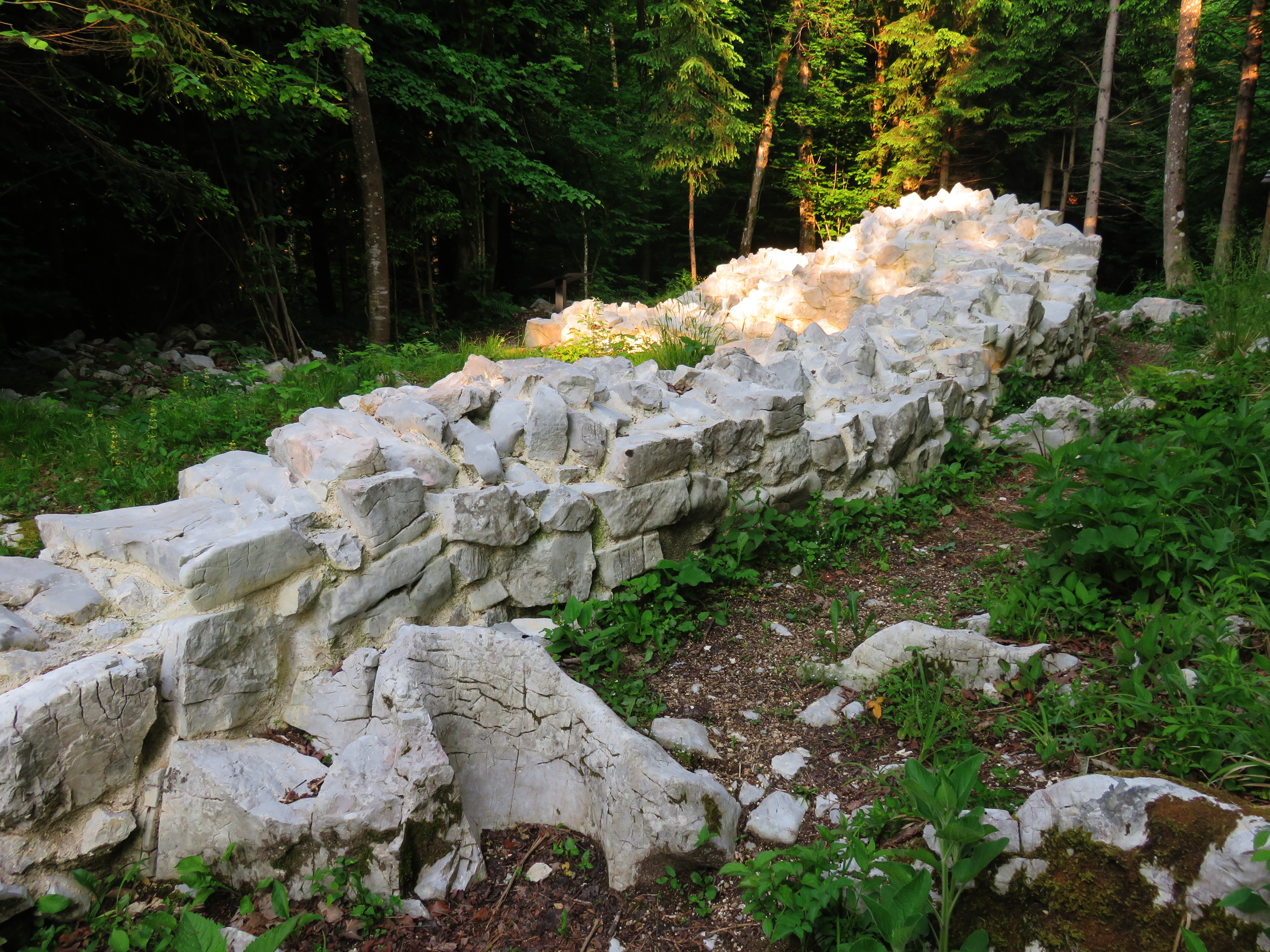
Part of the Claustra Alpium Iuliarum in Strmica

A section of a late Roman defense wall known as the Claustra Alpium Iuliarum passes through the southwestern part of Strmica. The remnants of 19 defense towers are visible along the course of the wall. A walking trail called Ajdovski zid (the Pagan Wall) with information signs has been laid out along the route.
