= Zaplana, Vrhnika =

Zaplana
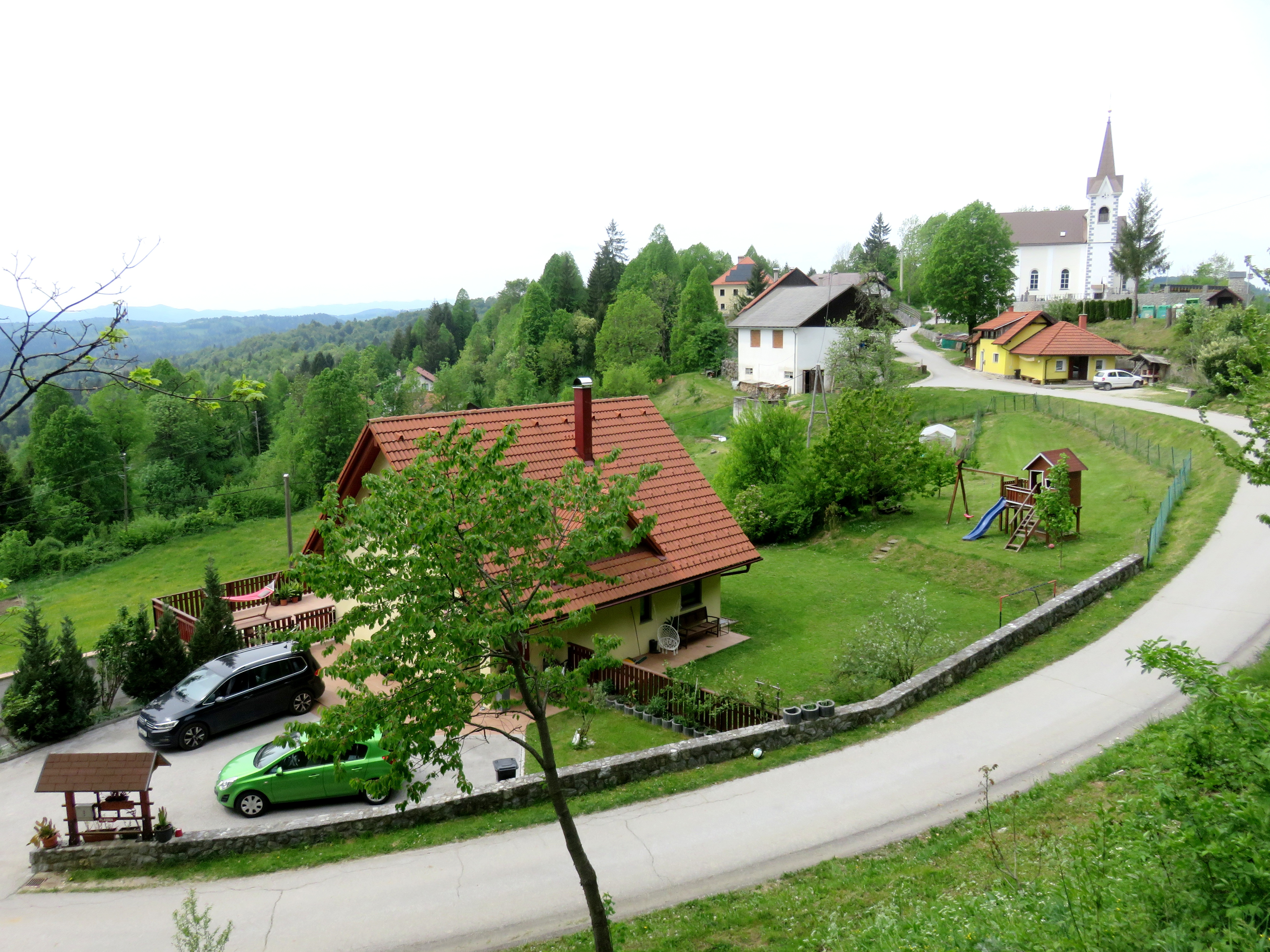

- Location in Slovenia
- Coordinates: 45°58′13.32″N 14°14′6.18″E
- Country: Slovenia
- Traditional region: Inner Carniola
- Statistical region: Central Slovenia
- Municipality: Vrhnika

Area
  - Total: 1.82 km^{2} (0.70 sq mi)
- Elevation: 664.3 m (2,179 ft)

Population (2002)
  - Total: 439

Zaplana (pronounced [zaˈplaːna]; German: Saplana) is a small village in the hills west of Vrhnika in the Inner Carniola region of Slovenia.

== History ==
The settlements of Jamnik, Jerinov Grič, Marinčev Grič, Mizni Dol, Prezid, Strmica, and Trčkov Grič were all administratively separated from Zaplana in 2002 and given the status of independent villages.

== Church ==
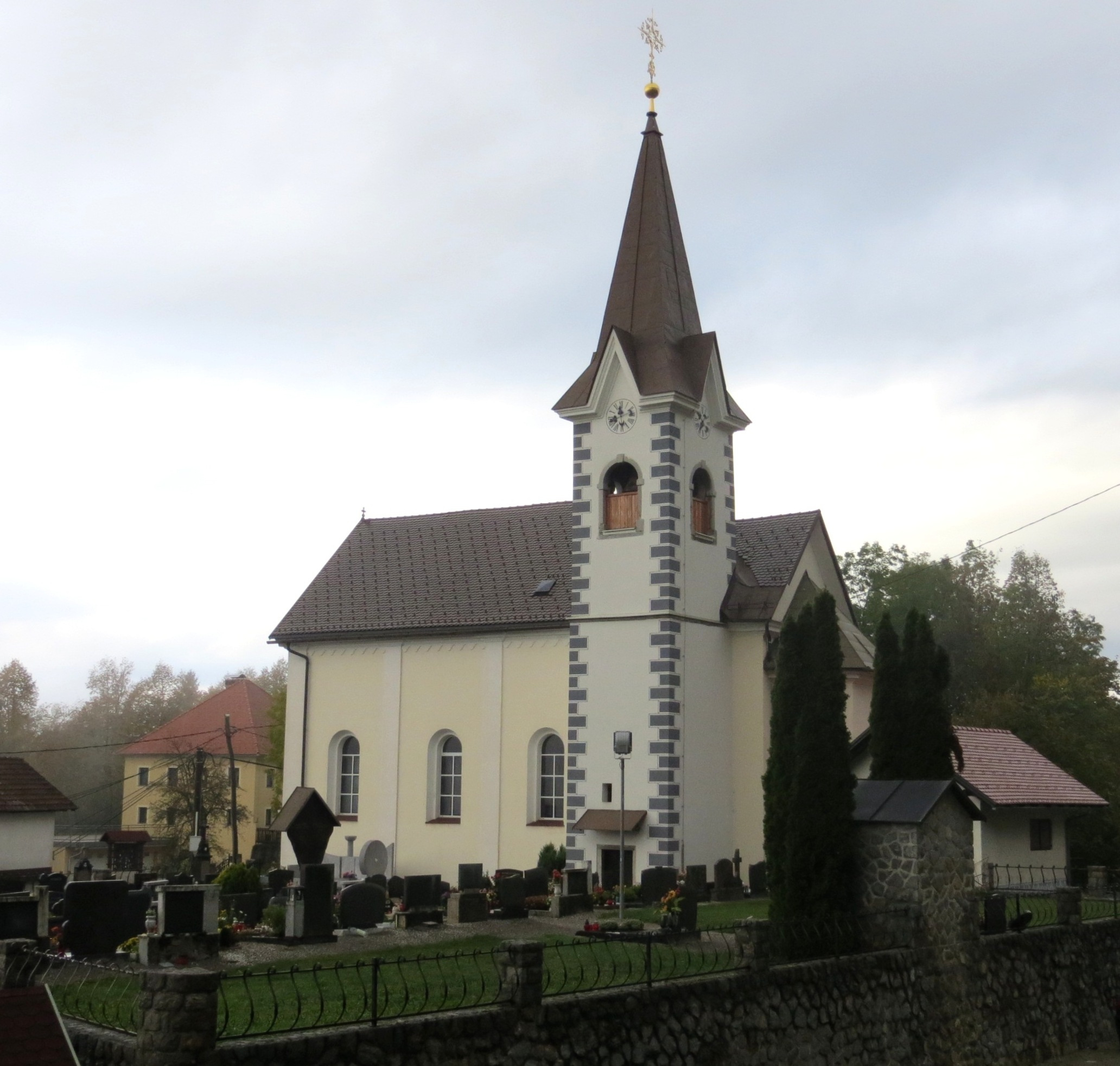
View from the east

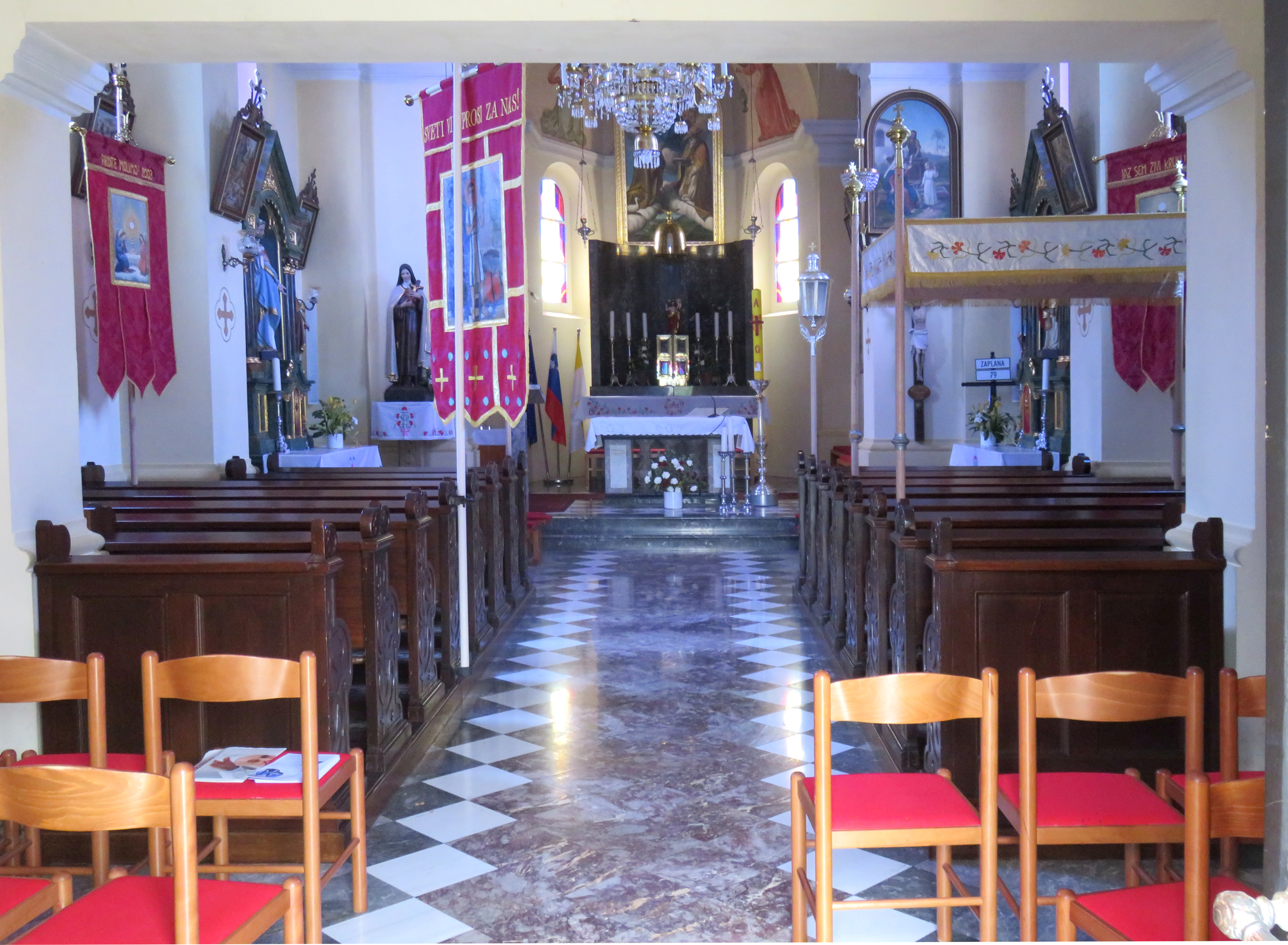
Interior

Saint Ulrich's Church

The parish church in the settlement is dedicated to Saint Ulrich and belongs to the Ljubljana Archdiocese. The church was renovated in a pseudo-Romanesque style after fire and earthquake damage in 1895.

== Notable people ==
- Janez Drnovšek (1950–2008), second president of Slovenia
