= Gric =

Gric may refer to:

- Grič (disambiguation), a South Slavic toponym
- GRIC, the Gila River Indian Community in Arizona, United States
