= Velika Ligojna =

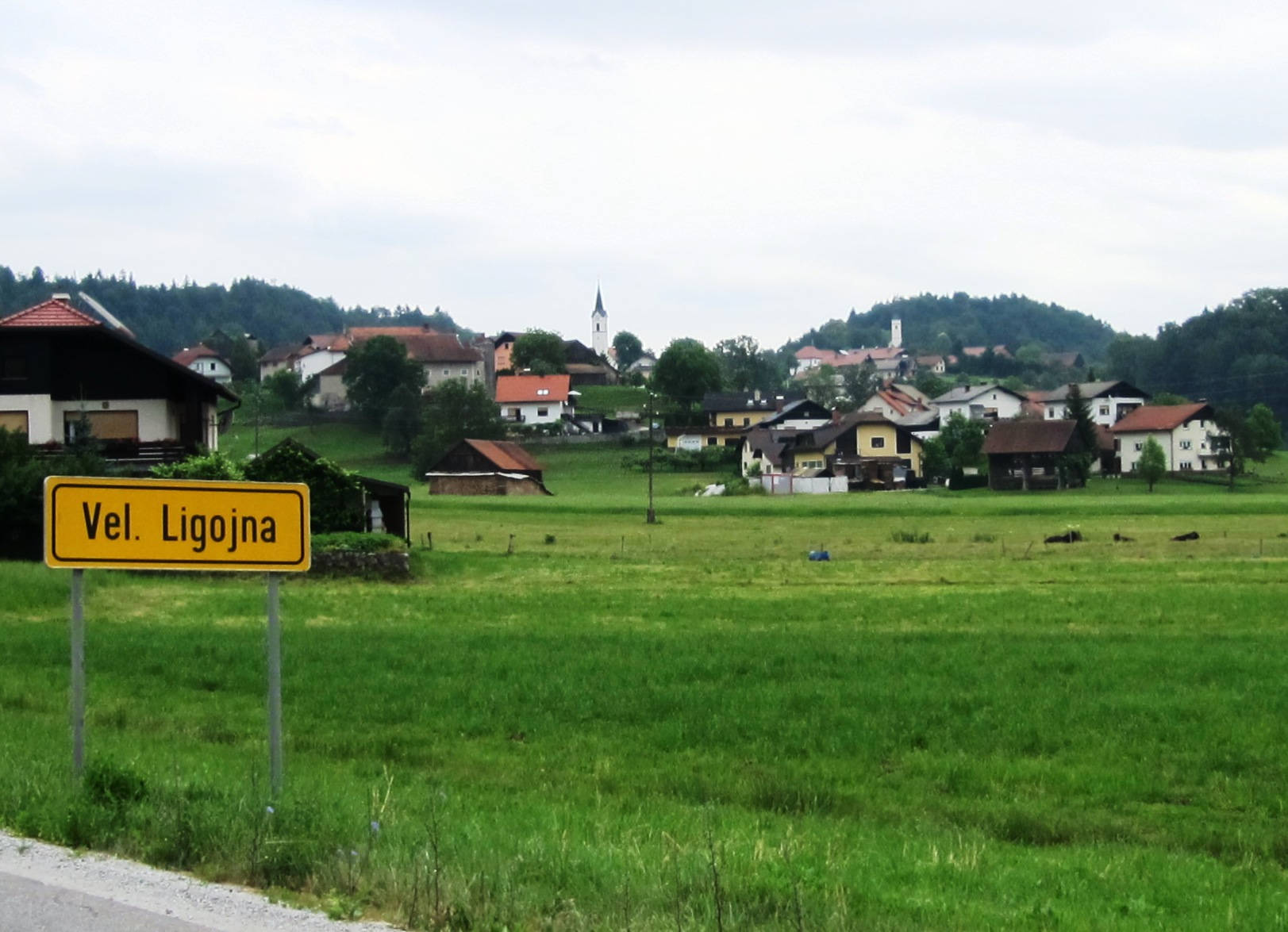
- Velika Ligojna

- Location in Slovenia
- Coordinates: 45°59′36.69″N 14°17′48.11″E
- Country: Slovenia
- Traditional region: Inner Carniola
- Statistical region: Central Slovenia
- Municipality: Vrhnika

Area
  - Total: 2.89 km^{2} (1.12 sq mi)
- Elevation: 319.4 m (1,048 ft)

Population (2002)
  - Total: 323

Velika Ligojna (pronounced [ˈʋeːlika liˈɡoːi̯na]; German: Großligoina) is a village north of Vrhnika in the Inner Carniola region of Slovenia. It includes the hamlets of Razpoti and Mavsarjev Hrib.

== Name ==
Together with neighboring Mala Ligojna (literally 'Little Ligojna'), Velika Ligojna (literally, 'Big Ligojna') was attested in written sources in 1309 as Luckossel (and as Lucozel in 1317, Lvkozel in 1318, and Vunderludigoni in 1526). The medieval attestations indicate that the name was Luko(va) sela (literally, 'Luka's village') in the 14th century, probably originally based on the name *Ľudigojь and then confused in the transcriptions with the similar name Luka. If so, today's name is a result of the sound change ľu- > li- and modern vowel reduction, and means 'Ljudigoj's village'.

== Church ==
The local church in Velika Ligojna is dedicated to Saint George and belongs to the Parish of Vrhnika. The church was first mentioned in written sources in 1526 and was remodeled in the Baroque style in the 18th century. It was surrounded by a defensive wall during the Ottoman wars in Europe.
