= Marinčev Grič =

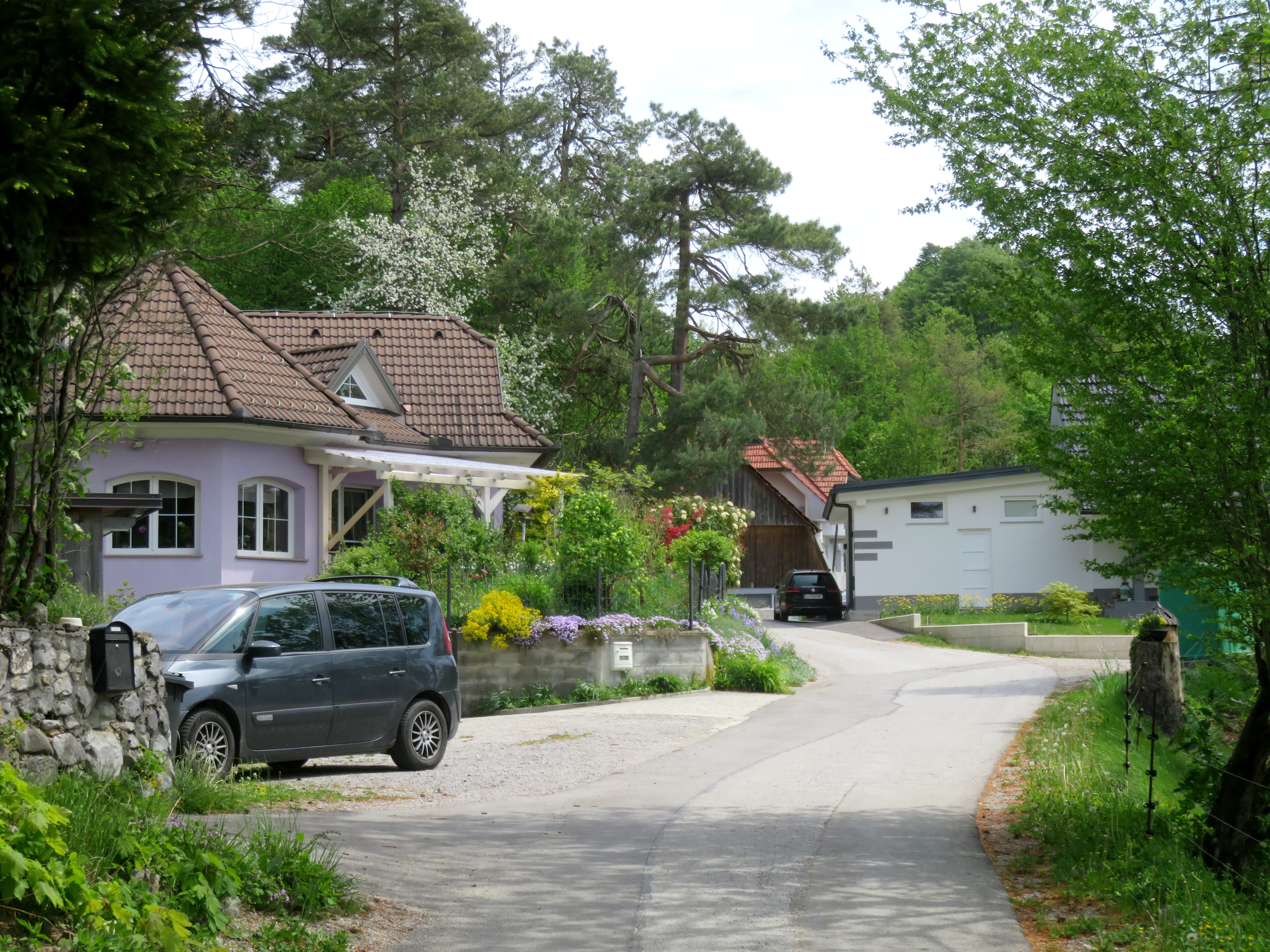

- Location in Slovenia
- Coordinates: 45°57′38.94″N 14°13′12.78″E
- Country: Slovenia
- Traditional region: Inner Carniola
- Statistical region: Central Slovenia
- Municipality: Vrhnika

Area
  - Total: 1.6 km^{2} (0.62 sq mi)
- Elevation: 642 m (2,106 ft)

Marinčev Grič (pronounced [maˈɾiːntʃɛu̯ ˈɡɾiːtʃ]) is a small settlement in the hills west of Vrhnika in the Inner Carniola region of Slovenia.

== Name ==
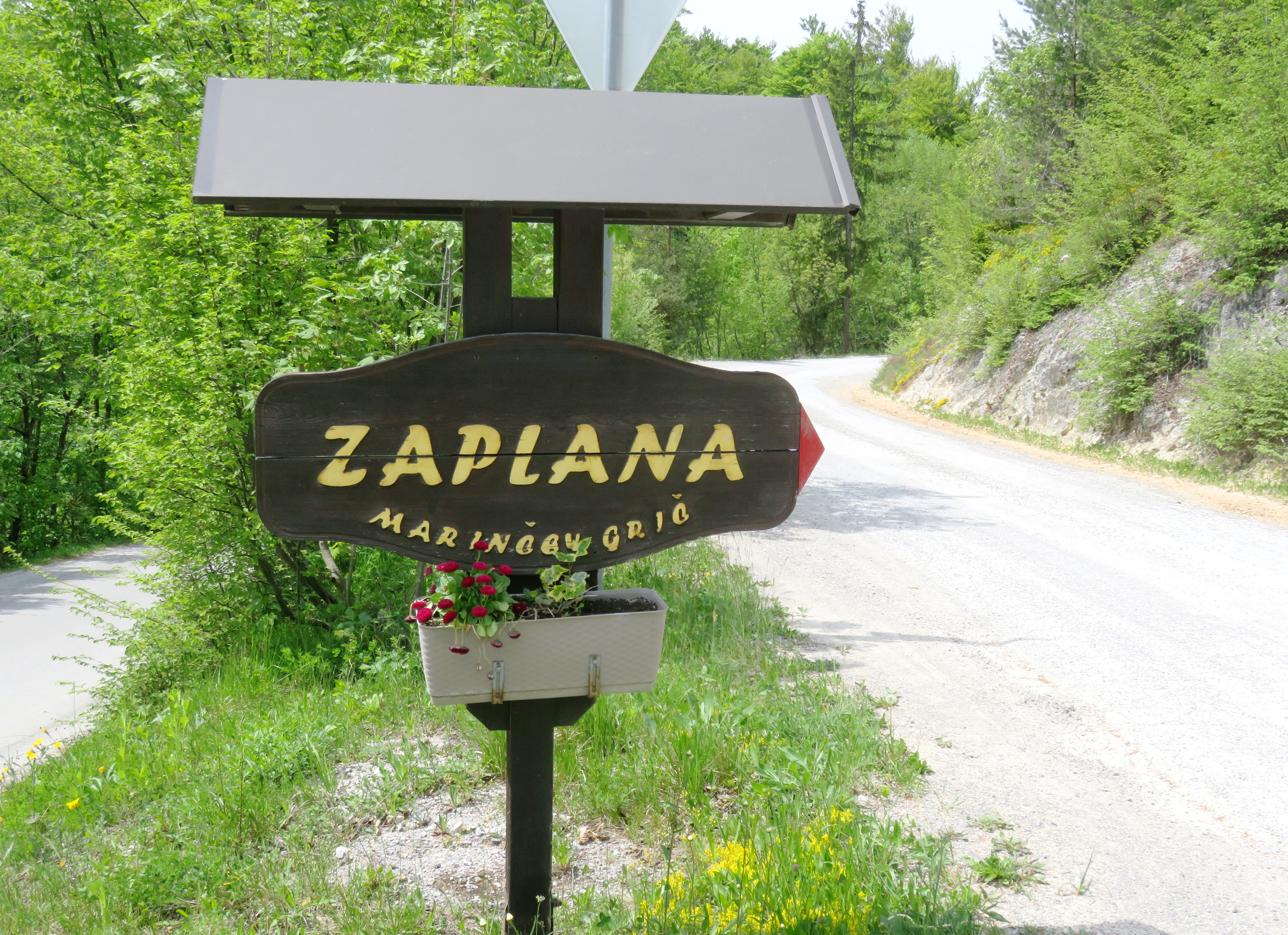
Sign for Marinčev Grič

The name Marinčev Grič literally means 'Marinč's hill'. The former hamlet that Marinčev Grič encompasses is called Marinčev Dol (literally 'Marinč's valley'). Both names refer to the Marinč farm, which is located in the western part of the settlement.

== History ==
Marinčev Grič was administratively separated from Zaplana in 2002 and made an independent settlement. Further adjustments were made to the boundaries of the settlement in 2016.
