= Drenov Grič =

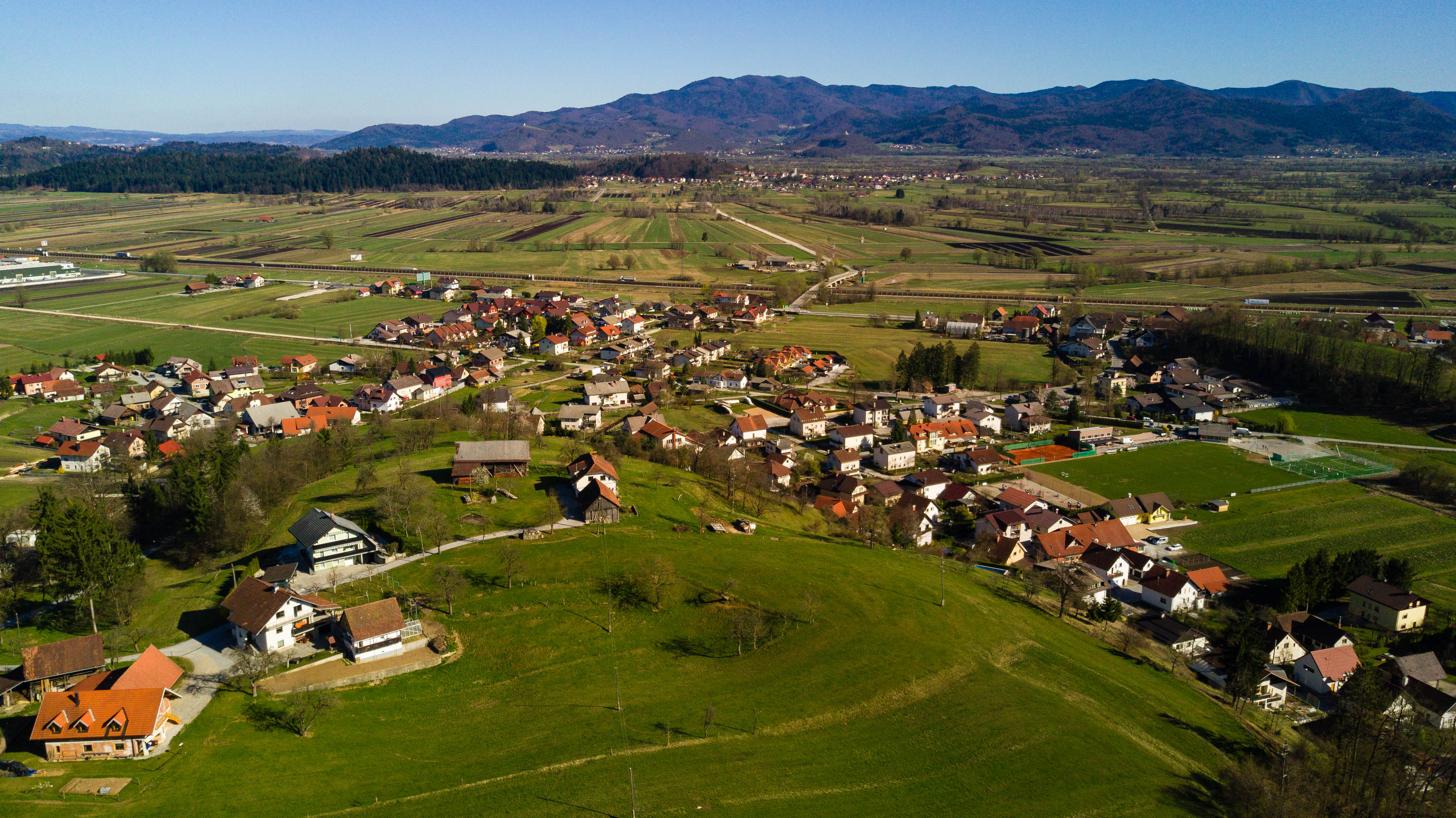

- Location in Slovenia
- Coordinates: 45°59′50.73″N 14°19′55.28″E
- Country: Slovenia
- Traditional region: Inner Carniola
- Statistical region: Central Slovenia
- Municipality: Vrhnika

Area
  - Total: 4.47 km^{2} (1.73 sq mi)
- Elevation: 291.3 m (956 ft)

Population (2002)
  - Total: 761

Drenov Grič (pronounced [ˈdɾeːnɔu̯ ˈɡɾiːtʃ], in older sources Drenova Gorica) is a settlement northeast of Vrhnika in the Inner Carniola region of Slovenia.
