= Stara Vrhnika =

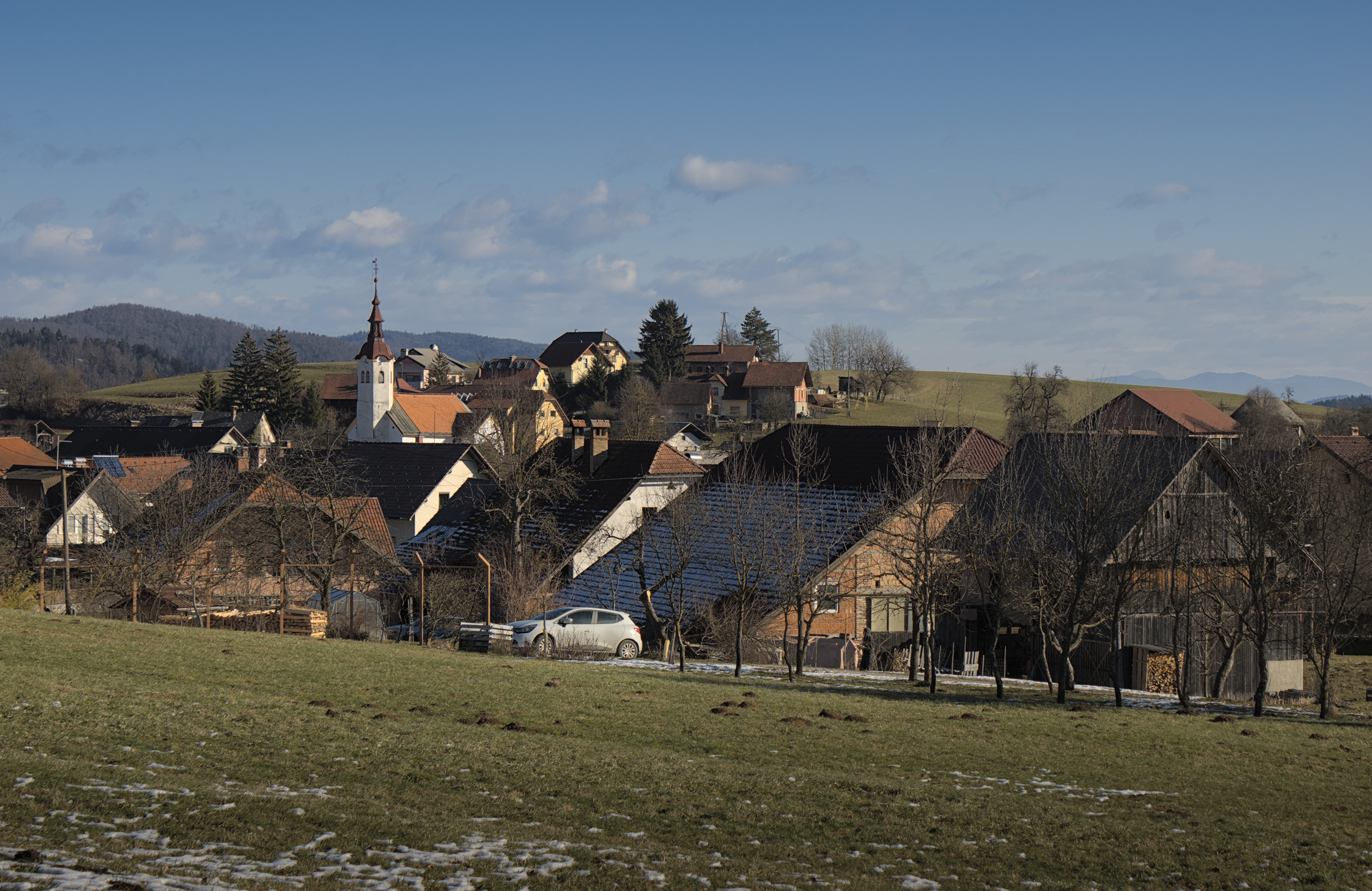

- Location in Slovenia
- Coordinates: 45°58′27.97″N 14°16′48.12″E
- Country: Slovenia
- Traditional region: Inner Carniola
- Statistical region: Central Slovenia
- Municipality: Vrhnika

Area
  - Total: 7.59 km^{2} (2.93 sq mi)
- Elevation: 322.5 m (1,058 ft)

Population (2002)
  - Total: 646

Stara Vrhnika (pronounced [ˈstaːɾa ˈʋəɾxnika]; German: Altoberlaibach) is a village north of Vrhnika in the Inner Carniola region of Slovenia. It includes the hamlets of Kuren (or Koren), Podčelo, and Razor.

== Name ==
The name Stara Vrhnika literally means 'old Vrhnika'. Stara Vrhnika was attested in Latin church records as ex superiore Verchnik, and as Alt Oberlaibach oder Gorena Verchnik between 1764 and 1783. The village was originally called Gornja Vrhnika or Zgornja Vrhnika (literally, 'upper Vrhnika') in Slovene, referring to its position about 30 meters above neighboring Vrhnika. With the arrival of the German-speaking Habsburgs, Vrhnika became known as Oberlaibach (literally, 'upper Ljubljana'), which would have made the German designation for Stara Vrhnika the semantically awkward Ober-Oberlaibach. It was therefore called Alt Oberlaibach (literally, 'old upper Ljubljana') in German, and this was the source of the Slovene name Stara Vrhnika.

== Church ==
The local church in Stara Vrhnika is dedicated to Saint Leonard. It was first mentioned in written sources in 1526. A second church on Kuren Hill west of the settlement is dedicated to Saint Nicholas. It has a flat painted wooden ceiling with poorly preserved paintings from the 16th century. Both churches belong to the Parish of Vrhnika.

== Notable people ==
Notable people that were born or lived in Stara Vrhnika include:

- Floris Oblak (1924–2006), painter
- Fran Ogrin (1880–?), technical writer and journalist
- Gustav Ogrin (1900–1962), designer and technical writer
- Ivan Ogrin (1875–1946), designer and crafts organizer
- Simon Ogrin (1851–1930), painter
- Valentin Petkovšek (1888–1975), agricultural specialist and technical writer
