= Podlipa, Vrhnika =

Podlipa
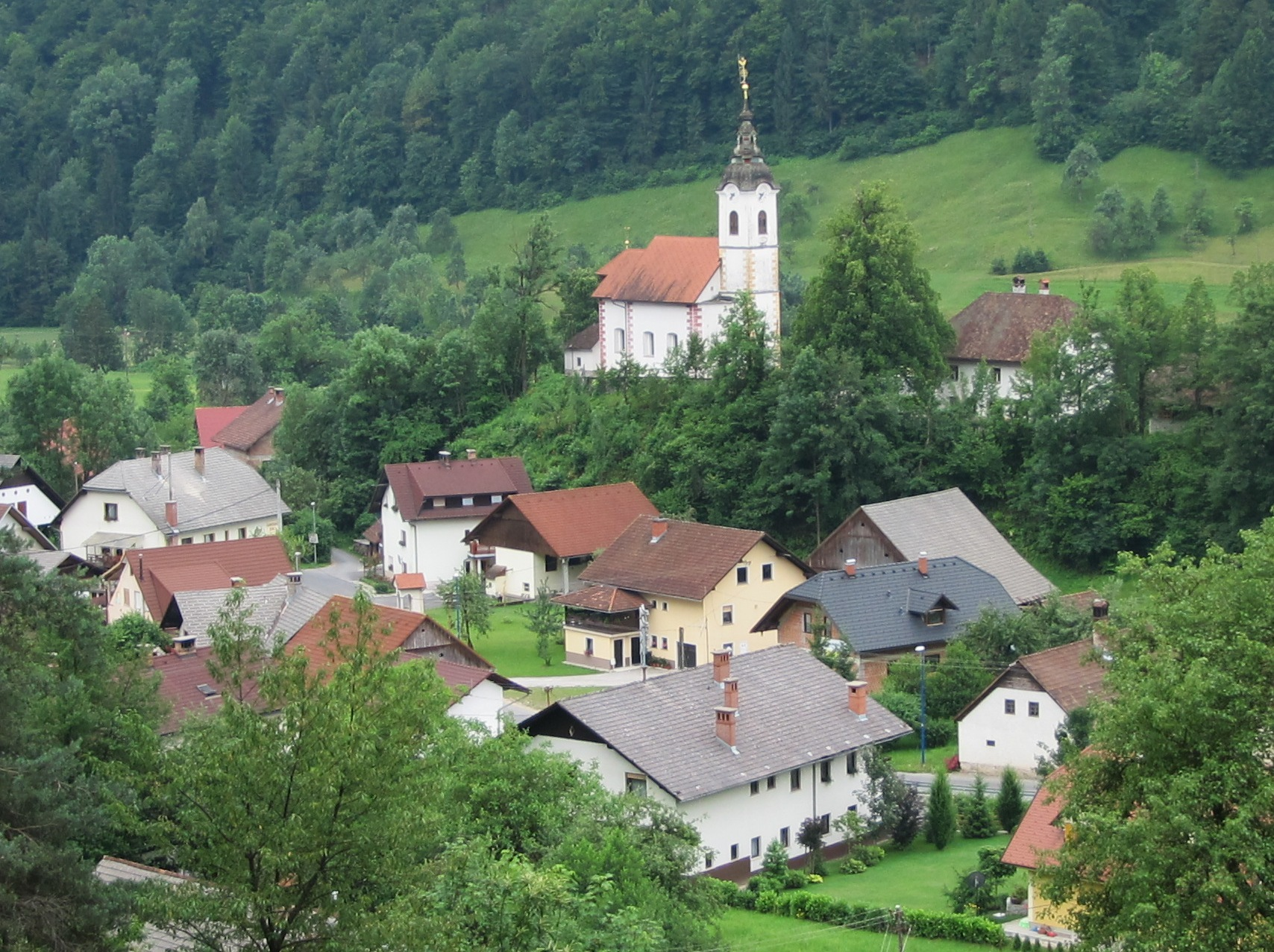

- Location in Slovenia
- Coordinates: 46°0′19.68″N 14°13′23.08″E
- Country: Slovenia
- Traditional region: Inner Carniola
- Statistical region: Central Slovenia
- Municipality: Vrhnika

Area
  - Total: 5.56 km^{2} (2.15 sq mi)
- Elevation: 347.1 m (1,139 ft)

Population (2002)
  - Total: 367

Podlipa (pronounced [pɔˈdliːpa]) is a village in a small valley northwest of Vrhnika in the Inner Carniola region of Slovenia. In addition to the hamlet of Dolino in the main part of the settlement, in includes the hamlets of Krošljev Hrib (Slovene: Krošljev hrib), Trčkov Hrib (Slovene: Trčkov hrib), Železnikov Hrib (Slovene: Železnikov hrib), and Podpesek.

== Church ==
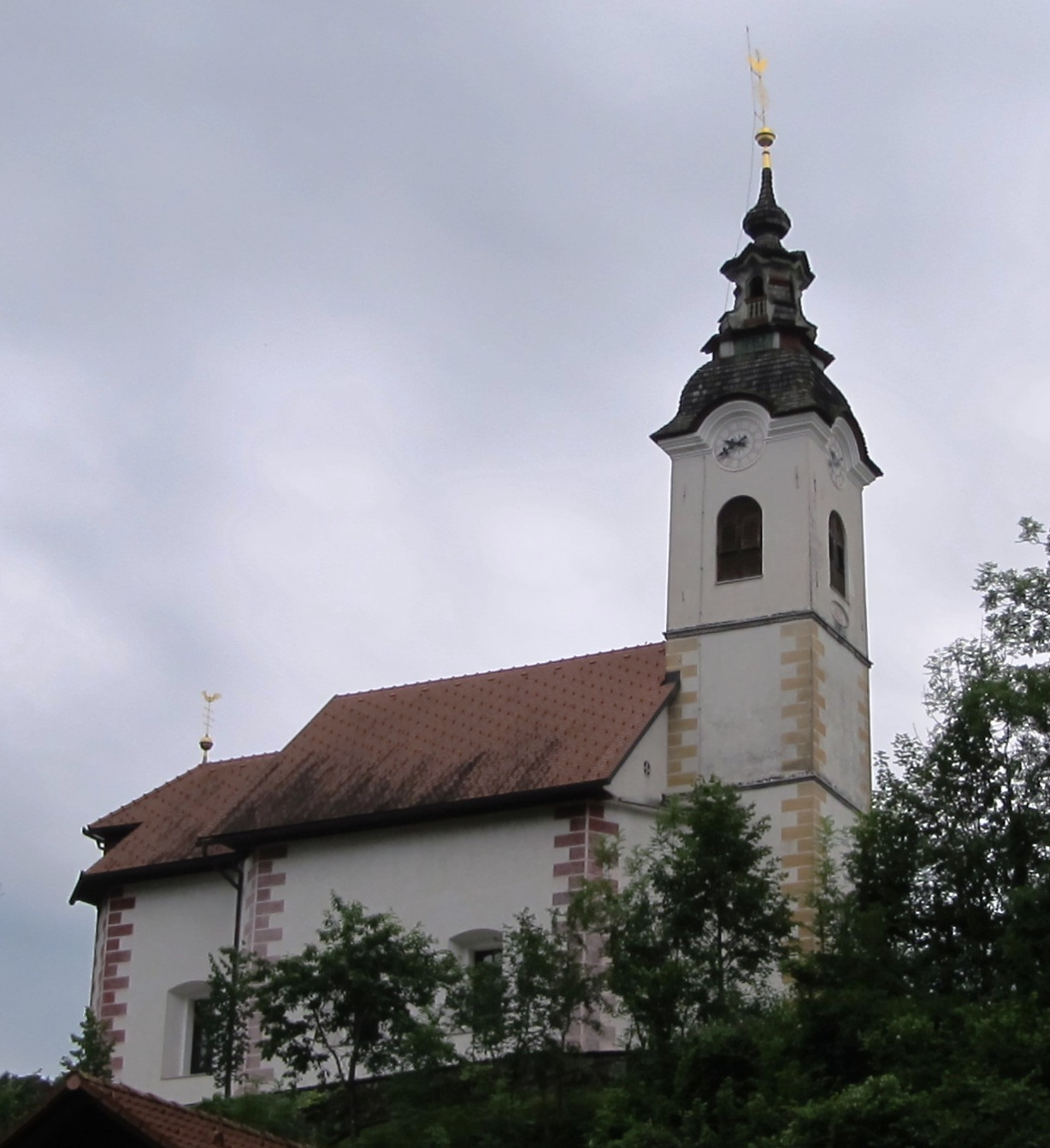
Saint Bricius' Church

The parish church in the settlement is dedicated to Saint Bricius and belongs to the Ljubljana Archdiocese.

== Notable people ==
Notable people that were born or lived in Podlipa include:

- Marija Brenčič-Jelen (1919–2000), poet
- Peter Hitzinger (1812–1867), historian
