= Padež (Leskovac) =

Padež Падеж
- Village
- Location within Serbia
- Coordinates: 42°51′18″N 22°01′37″E
- Country: Serbia
- District: Jablanica District
- Municipality: Leskovac

Population (2002)
  - Total: 58
- Time zone: UTC+1 (CET)
  - Summer (DST): UTC+2 (CEST)

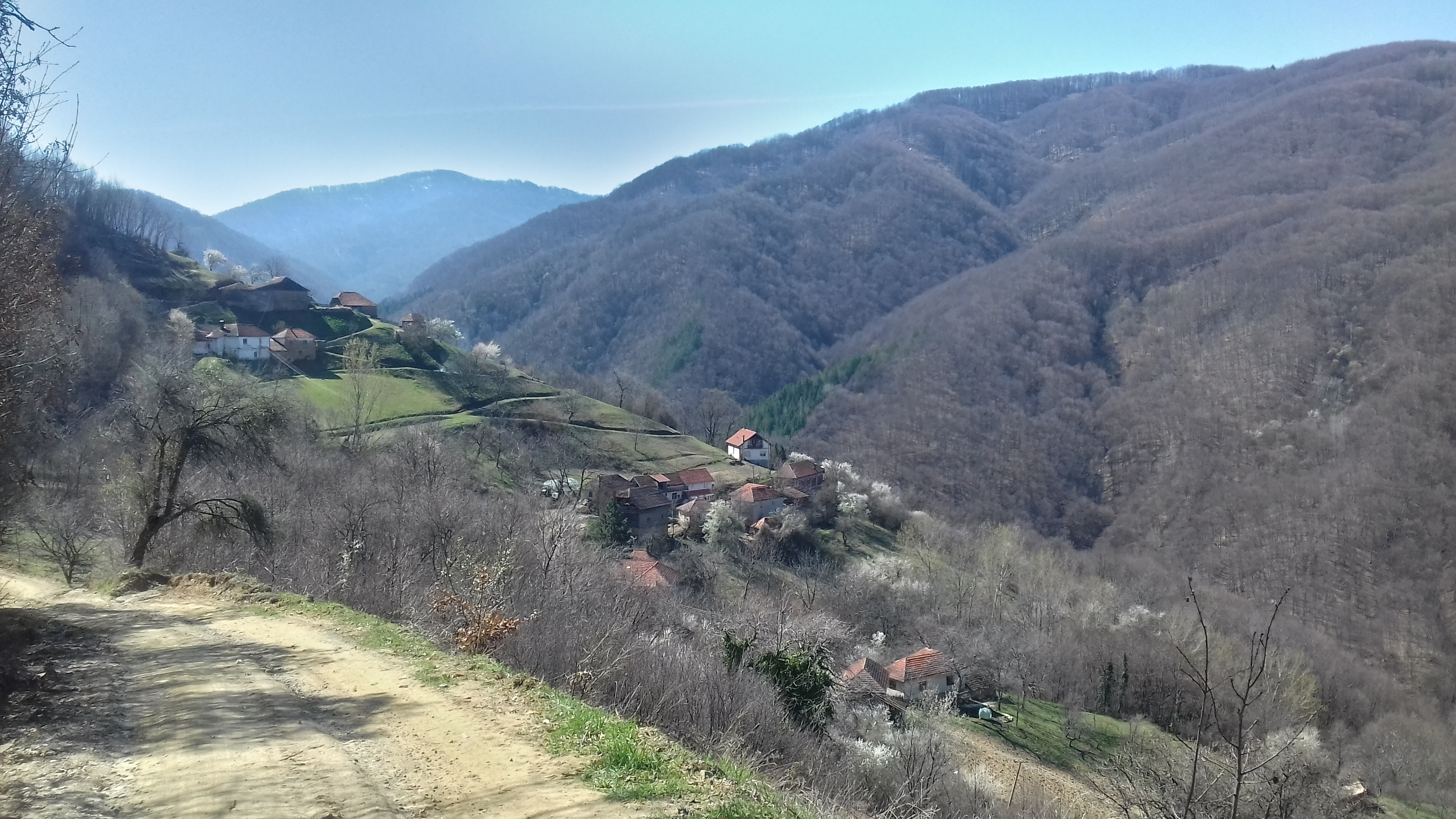

Padež is a village in the municipality of Leskovac, Serbia. According to the 2002 census, the village has a population of 58 people.
