= Municipality of Vrhnika =

Municipality of Slovenia

Municipality of Vrhnika Občina Vrhnika
- Municipality
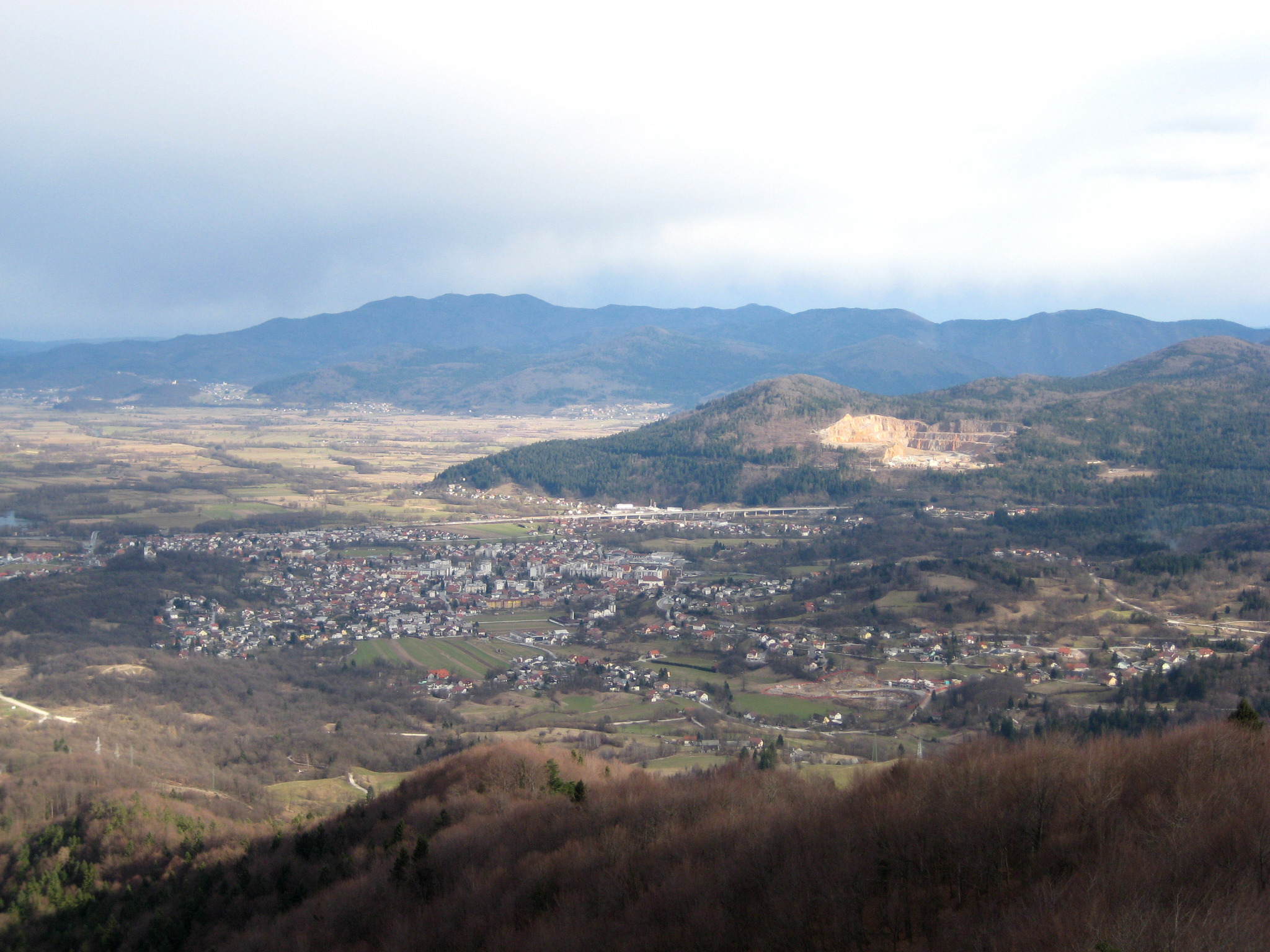

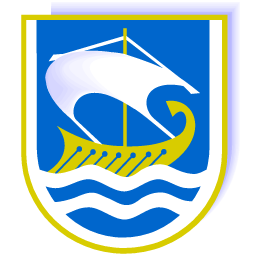
- Coat of arms

- Location of the Municipality of Vrhnika in Slovenia
- Coordinates: 45°58′N 14°18′E
- Country: Slovenia

Government
  - Mayor: Daniel Cukjati (SDS)

Area
  - Total: 116 km^{2} (45 sq mi)

Population (2012)
  - Total: 16,477
  - Density: 142/km^{2} (368/sq mi)
- Time zone: UTC+01 (CET)
  - Summer (DST): UTC+02 (CEST)
- Website: www.vrhnika.si

The Municipality of Vrhnika (pronounced [ˈʋəɾxnika]; Slovene: Občina Vrhnika) is a municipality in Slovenia. The administrative seat of the municipality is the town of Vrhnika.

== Settlements ==
In addition to the municipal seat of Vrhnika, the municipality also includes the following settlements:

- Bevke
- Bistra
- Blatna Brezovica
- Drenov Grič
- Jamnik
- Jerinov Grič
- Lesno Brdo
- Mala Ligojna
- Marinčev Grič
- Mirke
- Mizni Dol
- Padež
- Podlipa
- Pokojišče
- Prezid
- Sinja Gorica
- Smrečje
- Stara Vrhnika
- Strmica
- Trčkov Grič
- Velika Ligojna
- Verd
- Zaplana
- Zavrh pri Borovnici
