= Padež, Vrhnika =

Padež
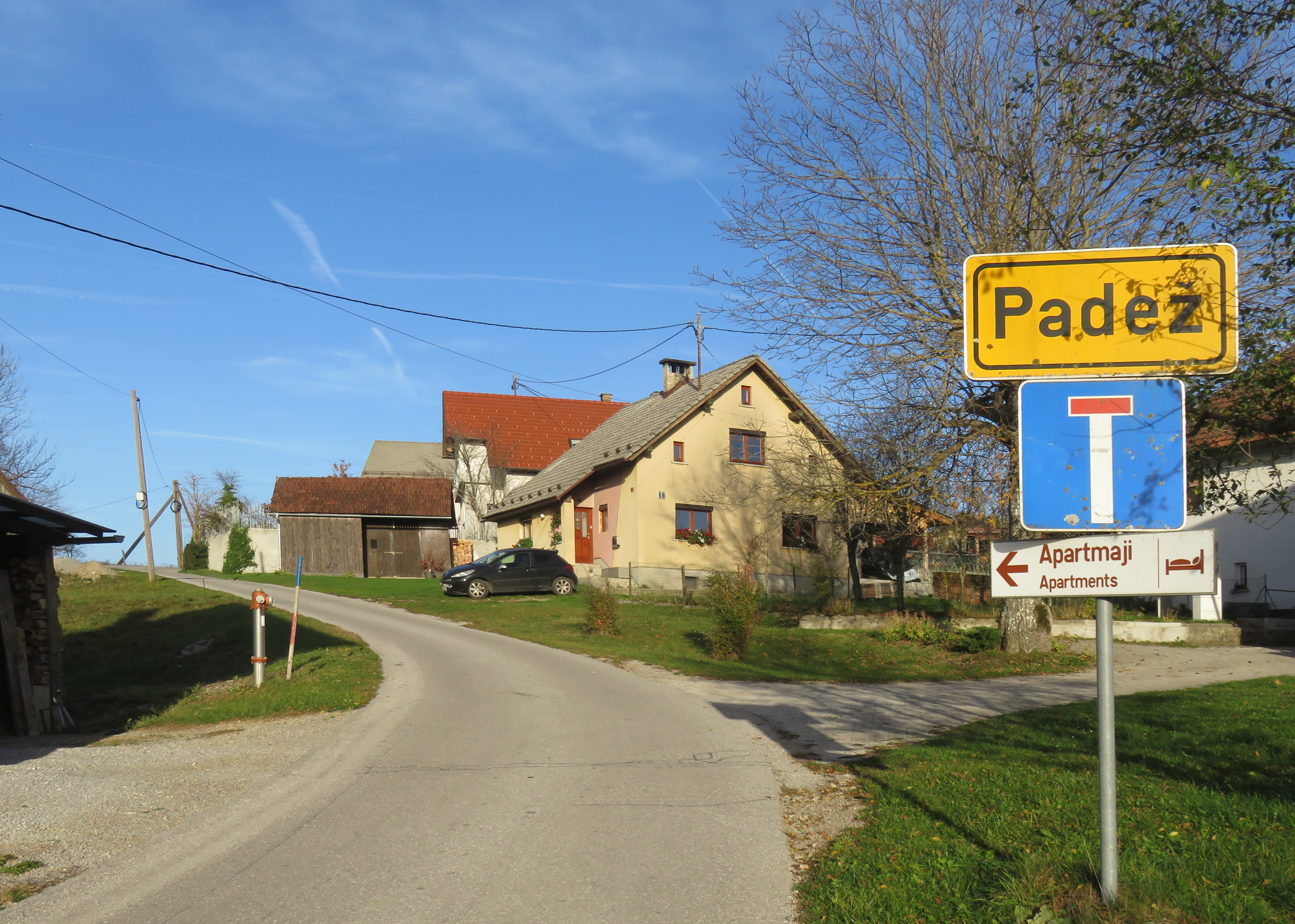

- Location in Slovenia
- Coordinates: 45°53′4.01″N 14°21′12.97″E
- Country: Slovenia
- Traditional region: Inner Carniola
- Statistical region: Central Slovenia
- Municipality: Vrhnika

Area
  - Total: 2.65 km^{2} (1.02 sq mi)
- Elevation: 728.7 m (2,391 ft)

Population (2002)
  - Total: 38

Padež (pronounced [ˈpaːdɛʃ]) is a small village in the hills south of Borovnica in the Inner Carniola region of Slovenia. It lies in the Municipality of Vrhnika.
