= Vrh =

Vrh or VRH may refer to:

== Places ==
=== Croatia ===
- Vrh, Istria County
- Vrh (Krk), Primorje-Gorski Kotar County

=== Montenegro ===
- Vrh, Bijelo Polje

=== Serbia ===
- Vrh (Kraljevo)

=== Slovenia ===
- Gorski Vrh, Tolmin
- Kanalski Vrh, Kanal ob Soči
- Planinski Vrh, Šentjur
- Selski Vrh, Šentjur
- Sveta Trojica, Domžale
- Sveti Vrh, Mokronog–Trebelno
- Vrh nad Krašnjo, Lukovica
- Vrh nad Laškim, Laško
- Vrh nad Želimljami, Škofljica
- Vrh pri Boštanju, Sevnica
- Vrh pri Dolskem, Dol pri Ljubljani
- Vrh pri Fari, Kostel
- Vrh pri Hinjah, Žužemberk
- Vrh pri Križu, Žužemberk
- Vrh pri Ljubnu, Novo Mesto
- Vrh pri Mlinšah, Zagorje ob Savi
- Vrh pri Pahi, Novo Mesto
- Vrh pri Poljanah, Ribnica
- Vrh pri Površju, Krško
- Vrh pri Šentjerneju, Šentjernej
- Vrh pri Sobračah, Ivančna Gorica
- Vrh pri Trebelnem, Mokronog–Trebelno
- Vrh pri Višnji Gori, Ivančna Gorica
- Vrh, Šmarje pri Jelšah, Šmarje pri Jelšah
- Vrh Svetih Treh Kraljev, Logatec
- Vrh, Trebnje, a former settlement

== Other uses ==
- Nissan VRH engine

== See also ==
- Vrh, Croatia (disambiguation)
