= Šmihel =

Šmihel (derived from *šent Mihael Saint Michael) may refer to:

Slovenia:

- Šmihel pri Novem Mestu
- Šmihel, Pivka
- Šmihel pri Žužemberku
- Šmihel pod Nanosom
- Šmihel, Laško
- Šmihel nad Mozirjem
- Šmihel, Nova Gorica
