= Gradenc =

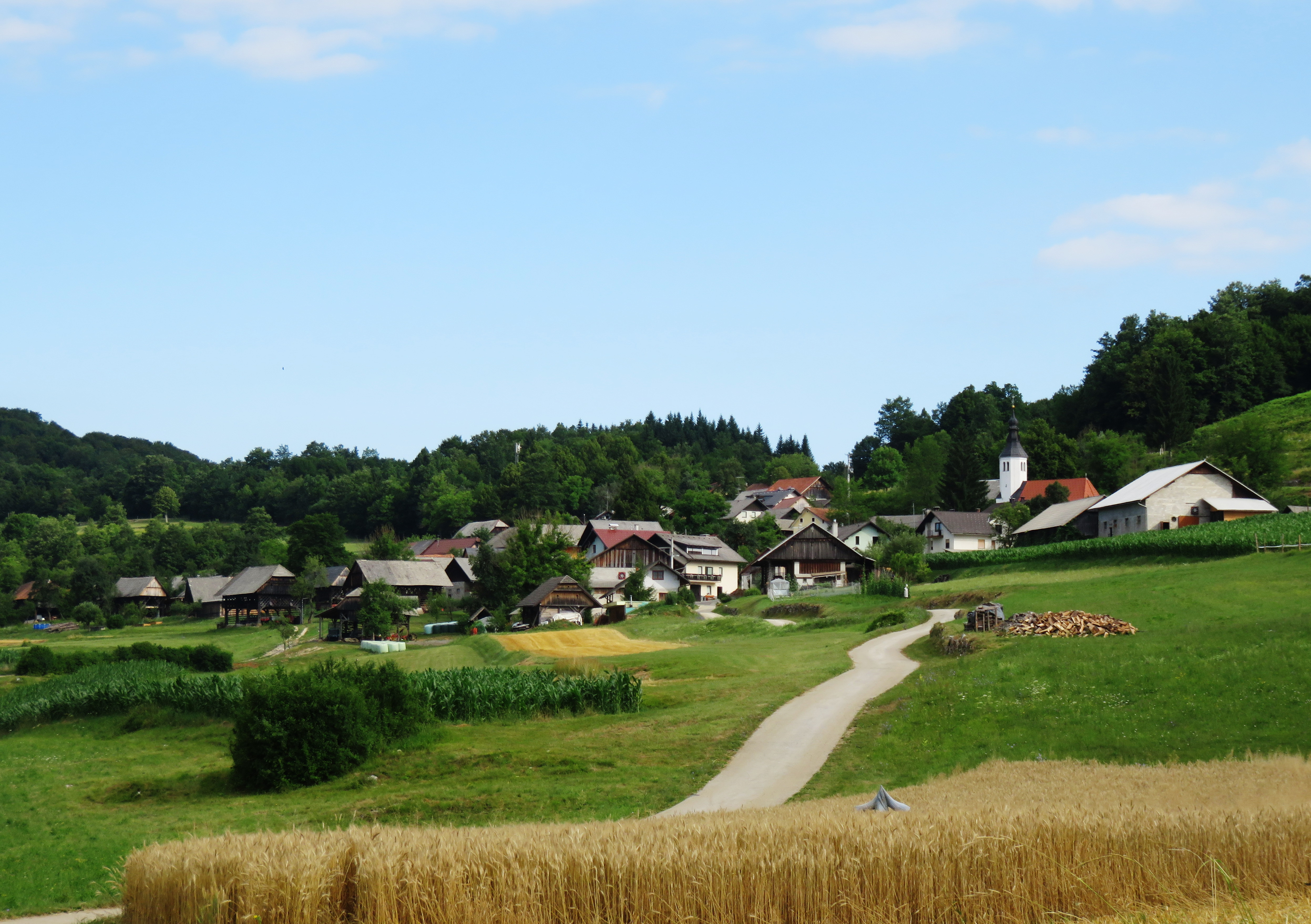

- Location in Slovenia
- Coordinates: 45°48′51.93″N 14°54′31.98″E
- Country: Slovenia
- Traditional region: Lower Carniola
- Statistical region: Southeast Slovenia
- Municipality: Žužemberk

Area
  - Total: 4.53 km^{2} (1.75 sq mi)
- Elevation: 331.2 m (1,087 ft)

Population (2002)
  - Total: 57

Gradenc (pronounced [ˈɡɾaːdɛnts]) is a small village in the Municipality of Žužemberk in southeastern Slovenia. It lies in the hills to the south of Žužemberk. The area is part of the historical region of Lower Carniola. The municipality is now included in the Southeast Slovenia Statistical Region.

== Church ==
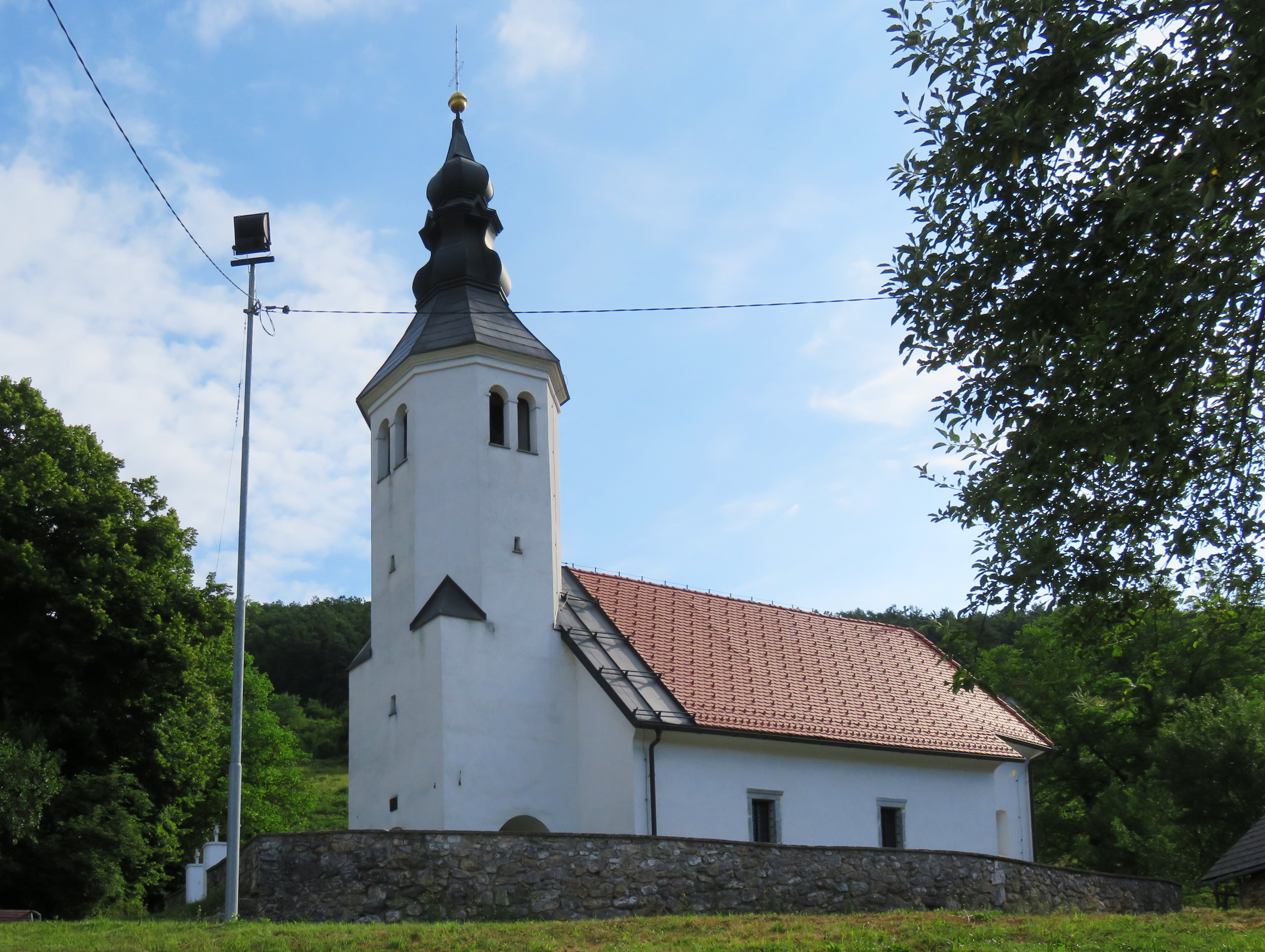
Saint Nicholas's Church

The local church is dedicated to Saint Nicholas and belongs to the Parish of Žužemberk. It was first mentioned in written documents dating to 1382, but was extensively rebuilt in the late 18th century.
