= Gornji Križ =

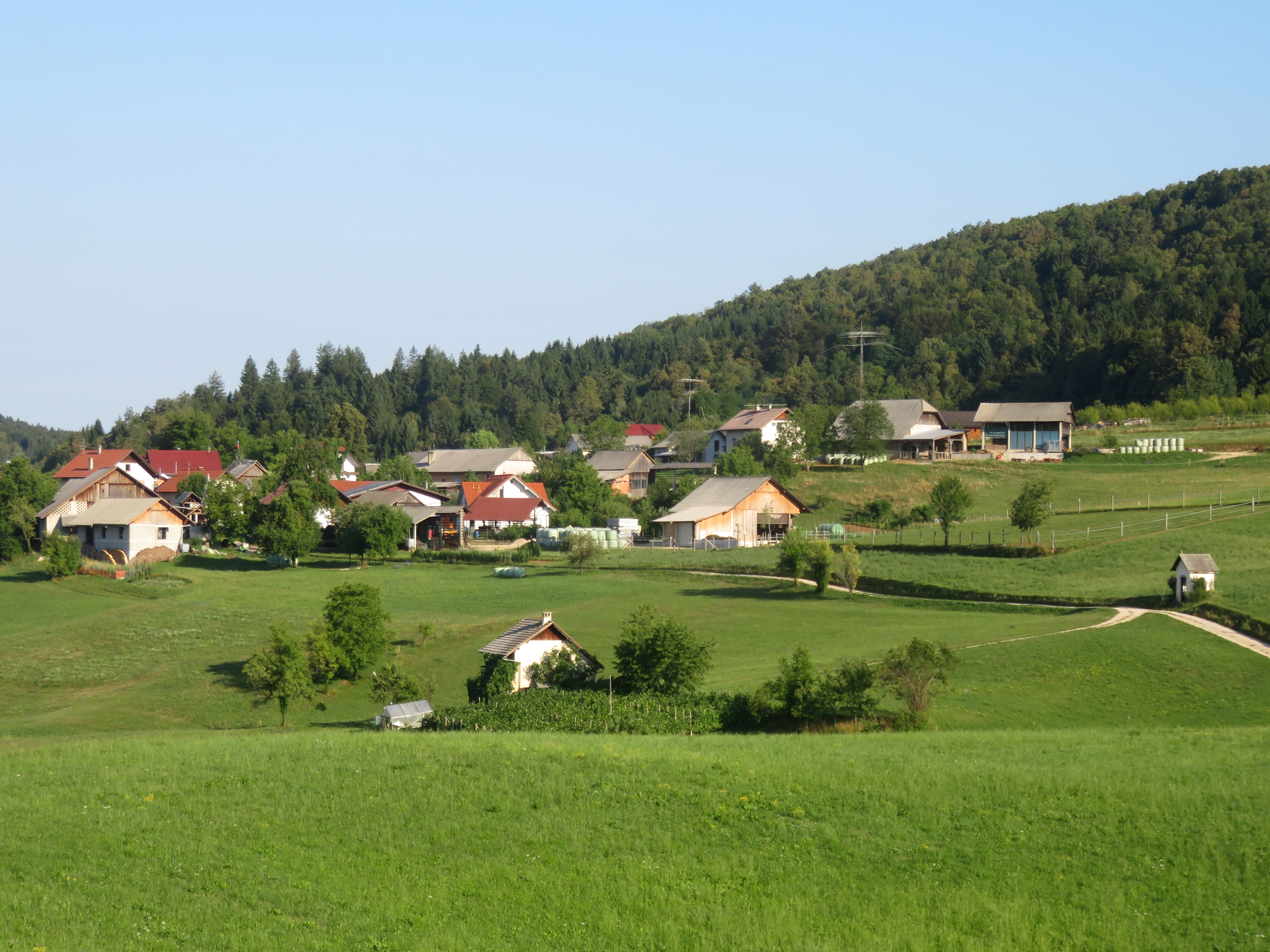

- Location in Slovenia
- Coordinates: 45°51′37.44″N 14°54′6.68″E
- Country: Slovenia
- Traditional region: Lower Carniola
- Statistical region: Southeast Slovenia
- Municipality: Žužemberk

Area
  - Total: 1.52 km^{2} (0.59 sq mi)
- Elevation: 340.6 m (1,117 ft)

Population (2002)
  - Total: 41

Gornji Križ (pronounced [ˈɡoːɾnji ˈkɾiːʃ]) is a small settlement in the Municipality of Žužemberk in southeastern Slovenia. The municipality is included in the Southeast Slovenia Statistical Region. The entire area is part of the historical region of Lower Carniola.
