= Drašča Vas =

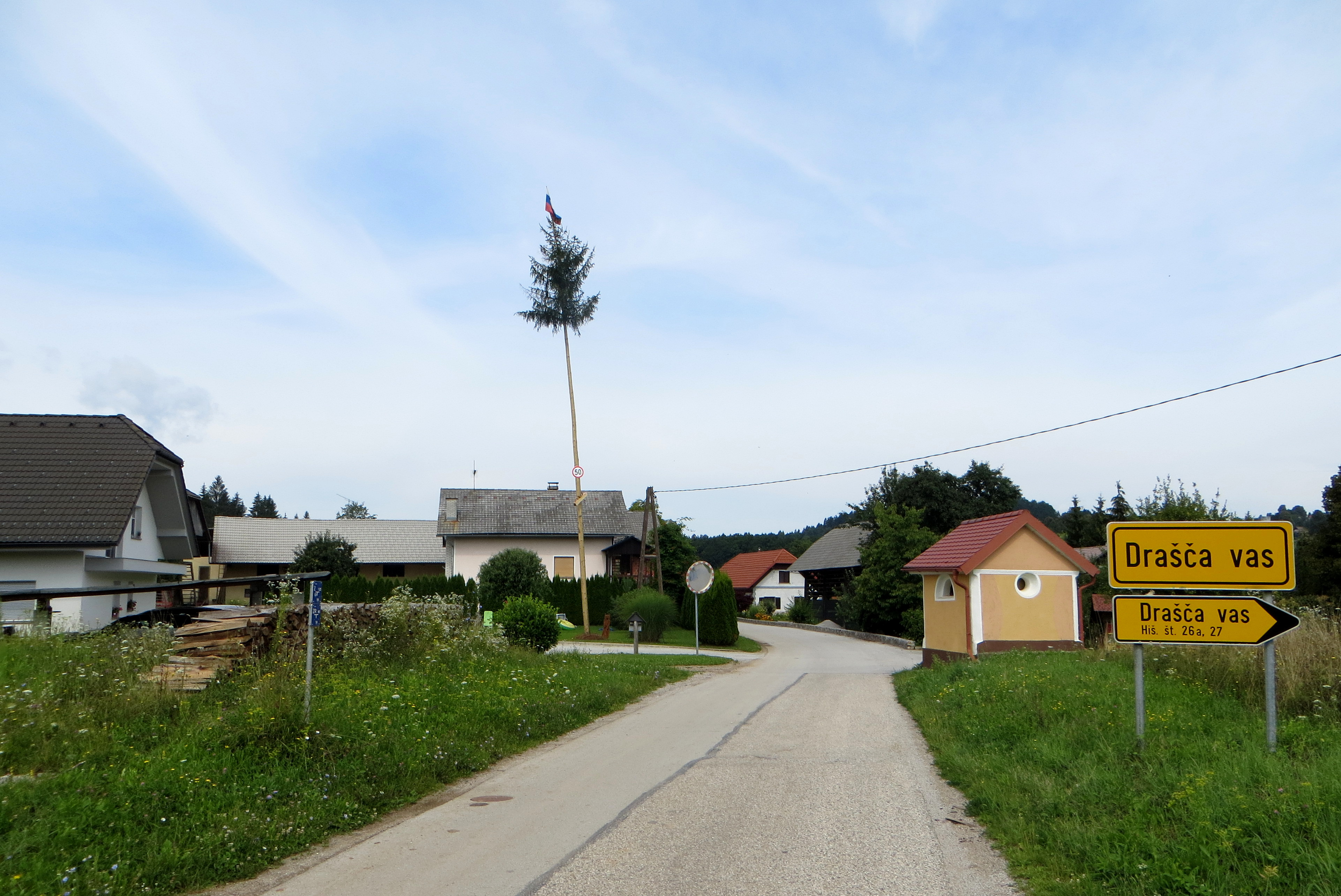

- Location in Slovenia
- Coordinates: 45°51′18.81″N 14°51′27.71″E
- Country: Slovenia
- Traditional region: Lower Carniola
- Statistical region: Southeast Slovenia
- Municipality: Žužemberk

Area
  - Total: 3.84 km^{2} (1.48 sq mi)
- Elevation: 252.1 m (827 ft)

Population (2002)
  - Total: 89

Drašča Vas (pronounced [ˈdɾaːʃtʃa ˈʋaːs]; Slovene: Drašča vas) is a village in the Municipality of Žužemberk in southeastern Slovenia. It lies on the right bank of the Krka River in the historical region of Lower Carniola. The municipality is now included in the Southeast Slovenia Statistical Region.
