= Prevole =

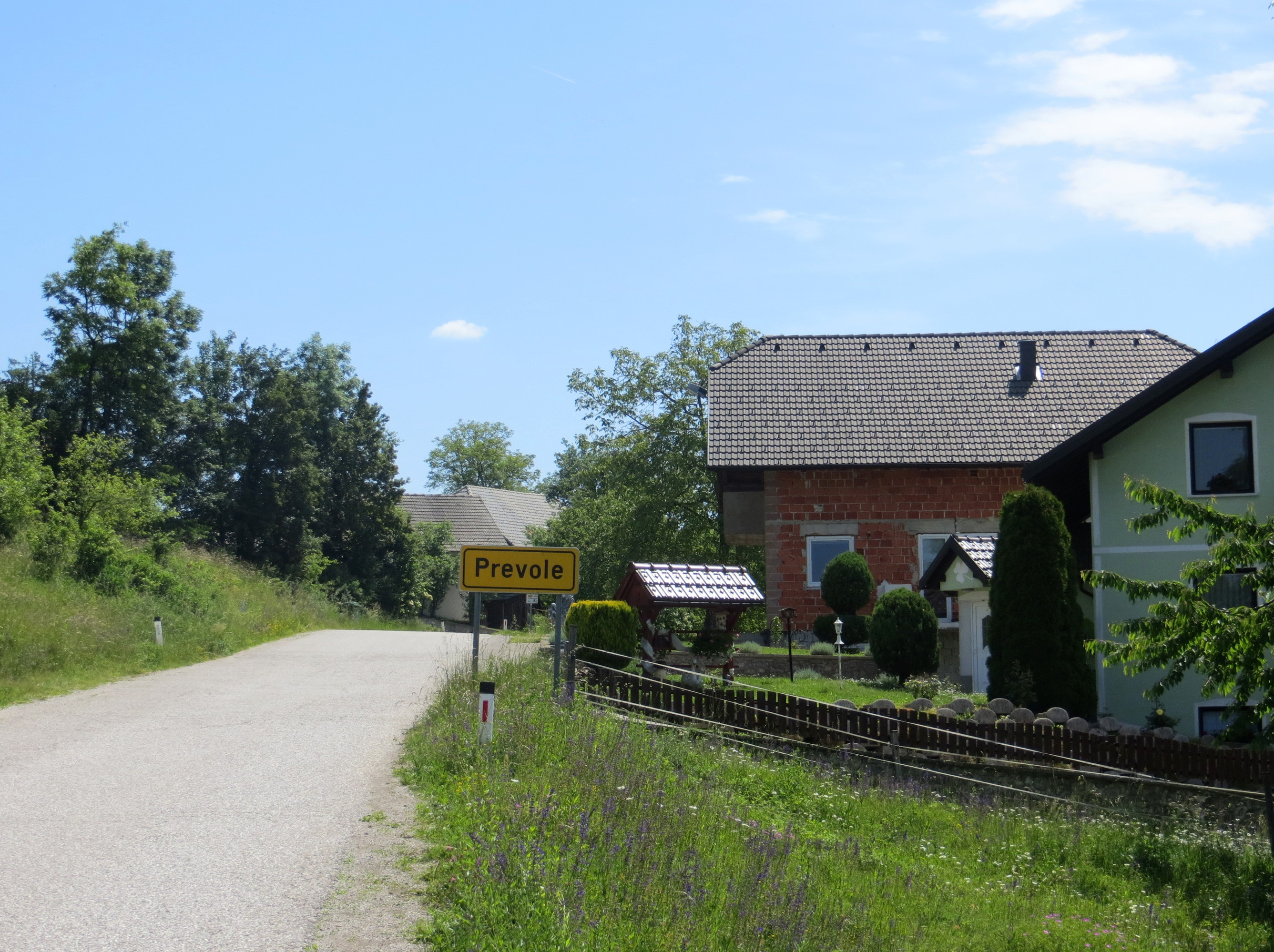

- Location in Slovenia
- Coordinates: 45°46′24.68″N 14°51′27.98″E
- Country: Slovenia
- Traditional region: Lower Carniola
- Statistical region: Southeast Slovenia
- Municipality: Žužemberk

Area
  - Total: 4.85 km^{2} (1.87 sq mi)
- Elevation: 478.1 m (1,569 ft)

Population (2002)
  - Total: 94

Prevole (pronounced [ˈpɾeːʋɔlɛ]) is a village in the Municipality of Žužemberk in southeastern Slovenia. The area is part of the historical region of Lower Carniola. The municipality is now included in the Southeast Slovenia Statistical Region.

== Church ==
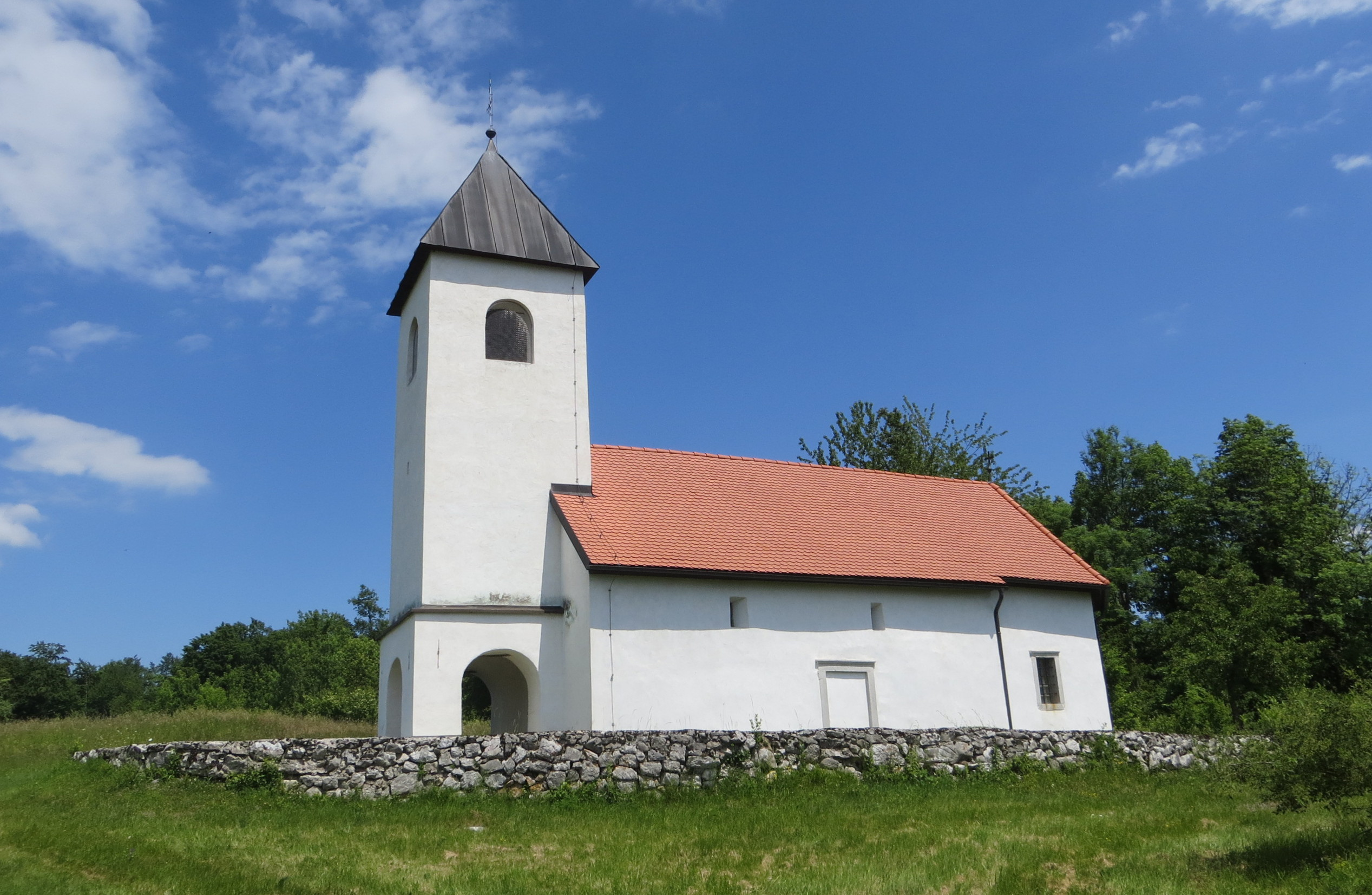
Holy Cross Church

The local church is dedicated to the Holy Cross (Slovene: Sveti Križ) and belongs to the Parish of Hinje. It has a 13th-century Romanesque nave and was extended in the 17th century.
