= Dolnji Križ =

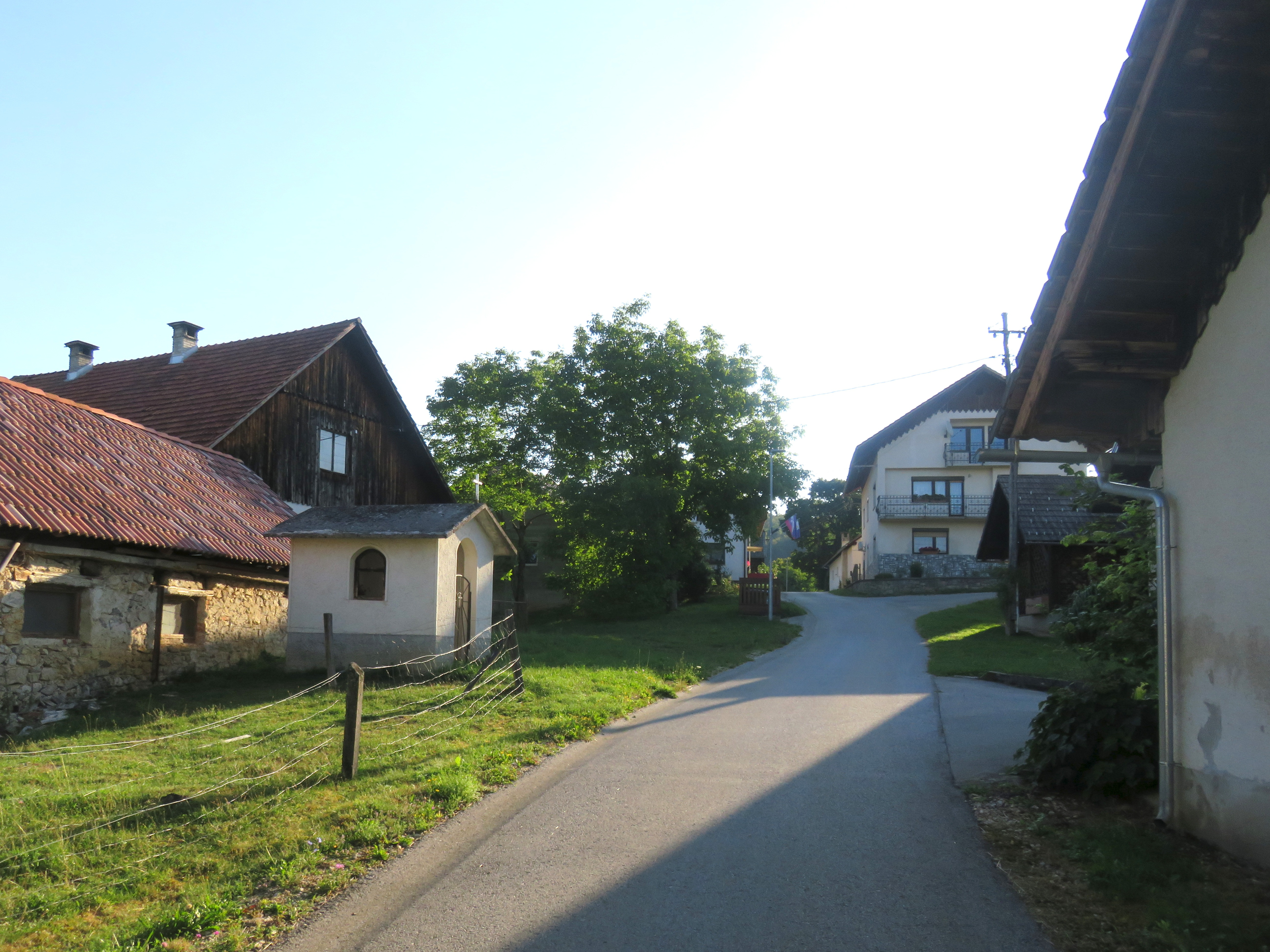

- Location in Slovenia
- Coordinates: 45°51′22.23″N 14°54′26.18″E
- Country: Slovenia
- Traditional region: Lower Carniola
- Statistical region: Southeast Slovenia
- Municipality: Žužemberk

Area
  - Total: 1.46 km^{2} (0.56 sq mi)
- Elevation: 316.9 m (1,040 ft)

Population (2002)
  - Total: 17

Dolnji Križ (pronounced [ˈdoːlnji ˈkɾiːʃ]) is a small settlement in the Municipality of Žužemberk in southeastern Slovenia. The municipality is included in the Southeast Slovenia Statistical Region. The area is part of the traditional region of Lower Carniola.
