= Vrhovo pri Žužemberku =

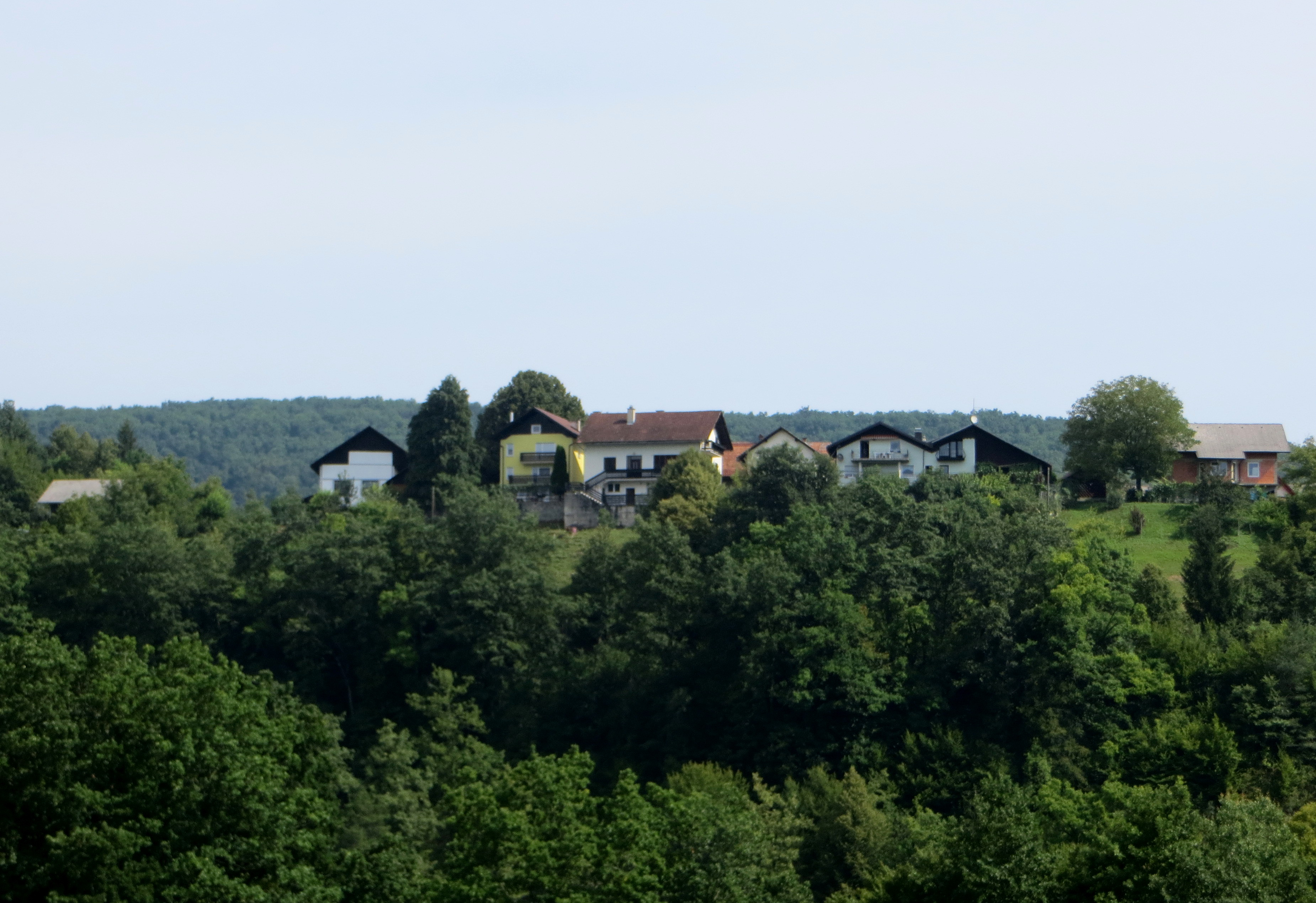

- Location in Slovenia
- Coordinates: 45°51′6.02″N 14°54′5.35″E
- Country: Slovenia
- Traditional region: Lower Carniola
- Statistical region: Southeast Slovenia
- Municipality: Žužemberk

Area
  - Total: 1.05 km^{2} (0.41 sq mi)
- Elevation: 272.1 m (893 ft)

Population (2002)
  - Total: 27

Vrhovo pri Žužemberku (pronounced [ʋəɾˈxɔːʋɔ pɾi ˈʒuːʒɛmbɛɾku]) is a small settlement above the left bank of the Krka River in the Municipality of Žužemberk in southeastern Slovenia. The area is part of the historical region of Lower Carniola. The municipality is now included in the Southeast Slovenia Statistical Region.

== Name ==
The name of the settlement was changed from Vrhovo to Vrhovo pri Žužemberku in 1953.

== Church ==
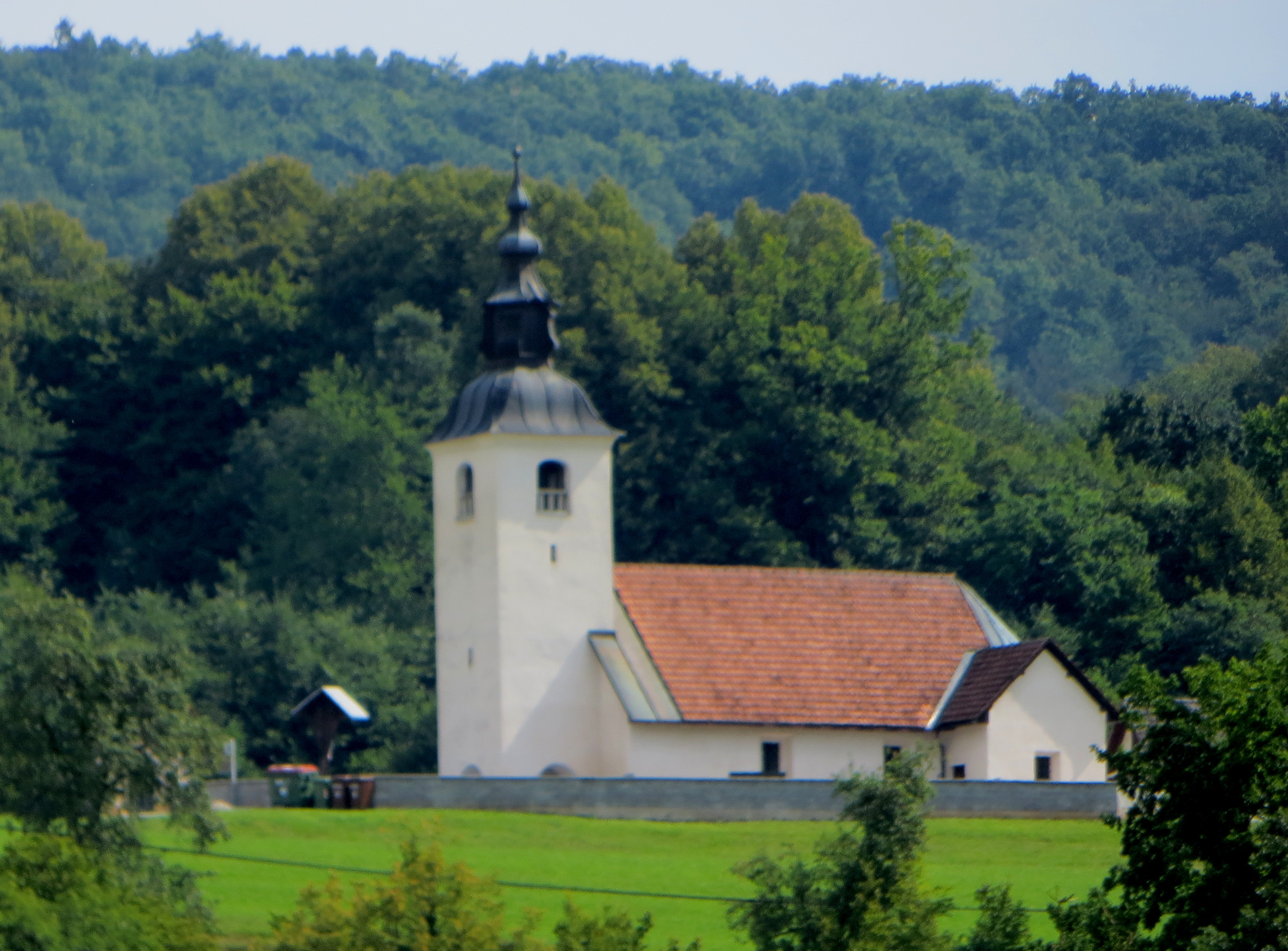
Holy Cross Church

The local church is dedicated to the Holy Cross and belongs to the Parish of Žužemberk. It is a medieval building first mentioned in written documents dating to 1526. It was completely restyled in the Baroque in the 17th century.
