= Dolnji Kot =

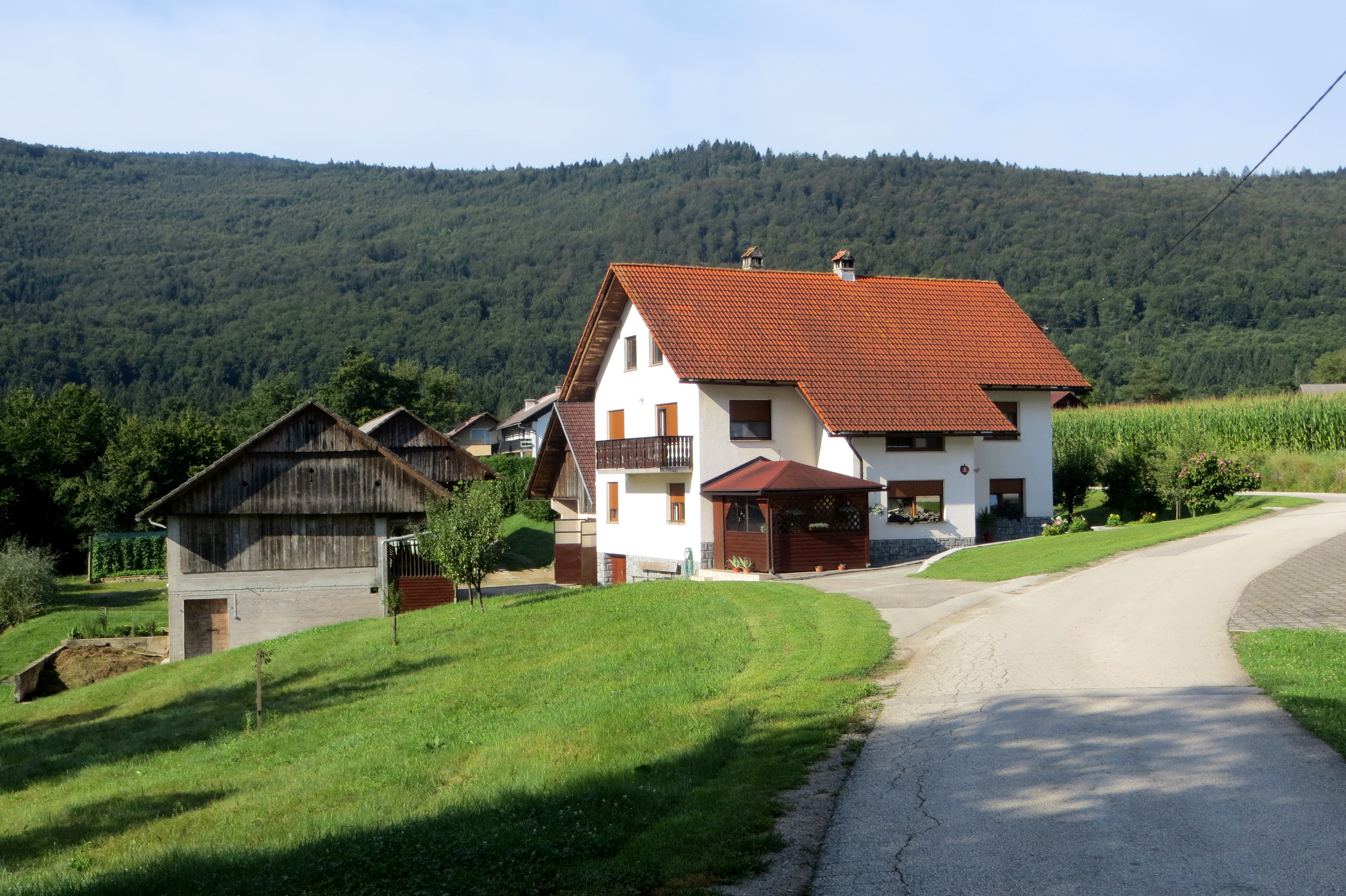

- Location in Slovenia
- Coordinates: 45°47′35.6″N 14°58′39.84″E
- Country: Slovenia
- Traditional region: Lower Carniola
- Statistical region: Southeast Slovenia
- Municipality: Žužemberk

Area
  - Total: 1.98 km^{2} (0.76 sq mi)
- Elevation: 203.7 m (668 ft)

Population (2002)
  - Total: 37

Dolnji Kot (pronounced [ˈdoːlnji ˈkoːt], German: Unterwinkel) is a settlement on the left bank of the Krka River in the Municipality of Žužemberk in southeastern Slovenia. The area is part of the historical region of Lower Carniola. The municipality is now included in the Southeast Slovenia Statistical Region.

A roadside chapel-shrine in the northern part of the settlement was built in 1898.
