= Sadinja Vas pri Dvoru =

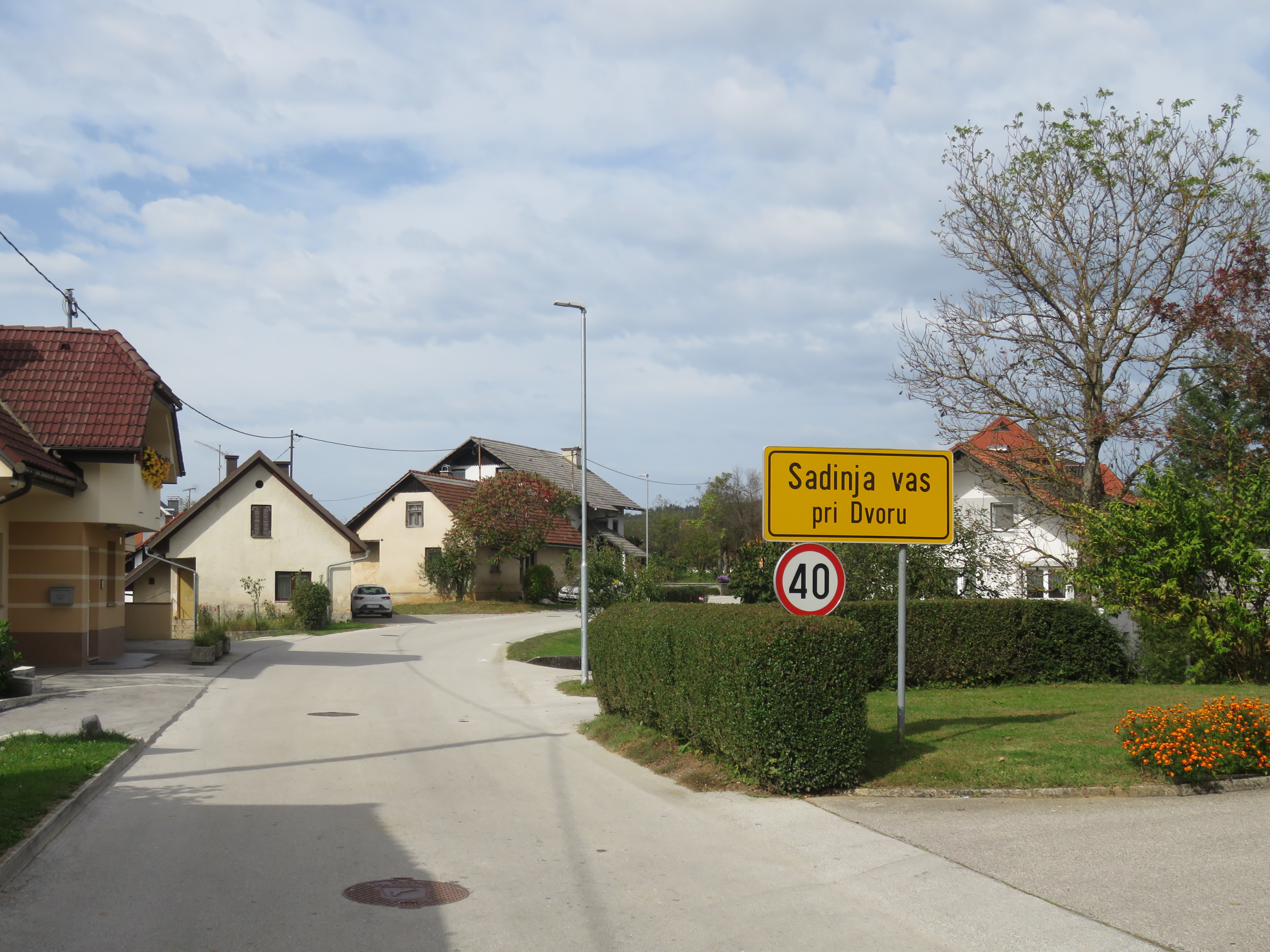

- Location in Slovenia
- Coordinates: 45°49′17.63″N 14°57′51.16″E
- Country: Slovenia
- Traditional region: Lower Carniola
- Statistical region: Southeast Slovenia
- Municipality: Žužemberk

Area
  - Total: 2.76 km^{2} (1.07 sq mi)
- Elevation: 248.2 m (814 ft)

Population (2002)
  - Total: 161

Sadinja Vas pri Dvoru (pronounced [saˈdiːnja ˈʋaːs pɾi ˈdʋɔːɾu]; Slovene: Sadinja vas pri Dvoru, German: Schöpfendorf) is a village in the Municipality of Žužemberk in southeastern Slovenia. It lies on the left bank of the Krka River just off the regional road from Žužemberk to Dvor. The area is part of the historical region of Lower Carniola. The municipality is now included in the Southeast Slovenia Statistical Region.

== Name ==
The name of the settlement was recorded as Schependorf in 1286, Scheffendorff in 1416, and Schephendorf and Schephndorf in 1454. The Slovene name developed from *Sodinja vas 'village belonging to a sodij (village judge)', which is also confirmed by the Middle High German equivalent with schep(f)e 'member of the judicial bench' who assisted the lord of the estate in judicial matters. The name of the settlement was changed from Sadinja vas to Sadinja vas pri Dvoru in 1955.
