= Boršt pri Dvoru =

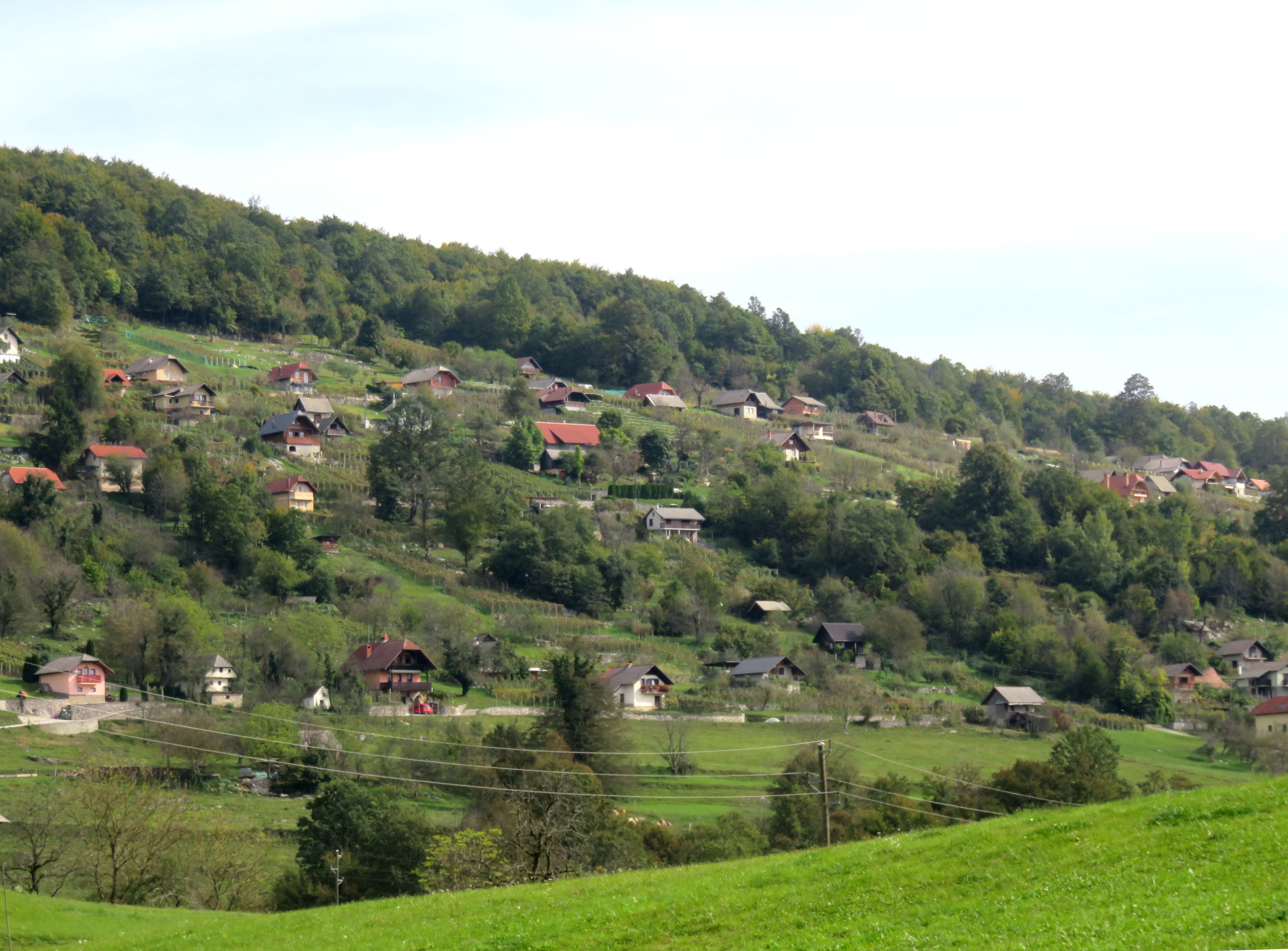

- Location in Slovenia
- Coordinates: 45°49′13.43″N 15°0′17.1″E
- Country: Slovenia
- Traditional region: Lower Carniola
- Statistical region: Southeast Slovenia
- Municipality: Žužemberk

Area
  - Total: 1.42 km^{2} (0.55 sq mi)
- Elevation: 415.8 m (1,364 ft)

Population (2002)
  - Total: 22

Boršt pri Dvoru (pronounced [ˈbɔɾʃt pɾi ˈdʋɔːɾu]) is a settlement in the Municipality of Žužemberk in southeastern Slovenia. The area is part of the historical region of Lower Carniola. The municipality is now included in the Southeast Slovenia Statistical Region.

== Name ==
The name of the settlement was changed from Boršt to Boršt pri Dvoru in 1955.

== Cultural heritage ==
A small roadside chapel-shrine in the northern part of the village dates to 1851.
