= Podgozd, Žužemberk =

Podgozd
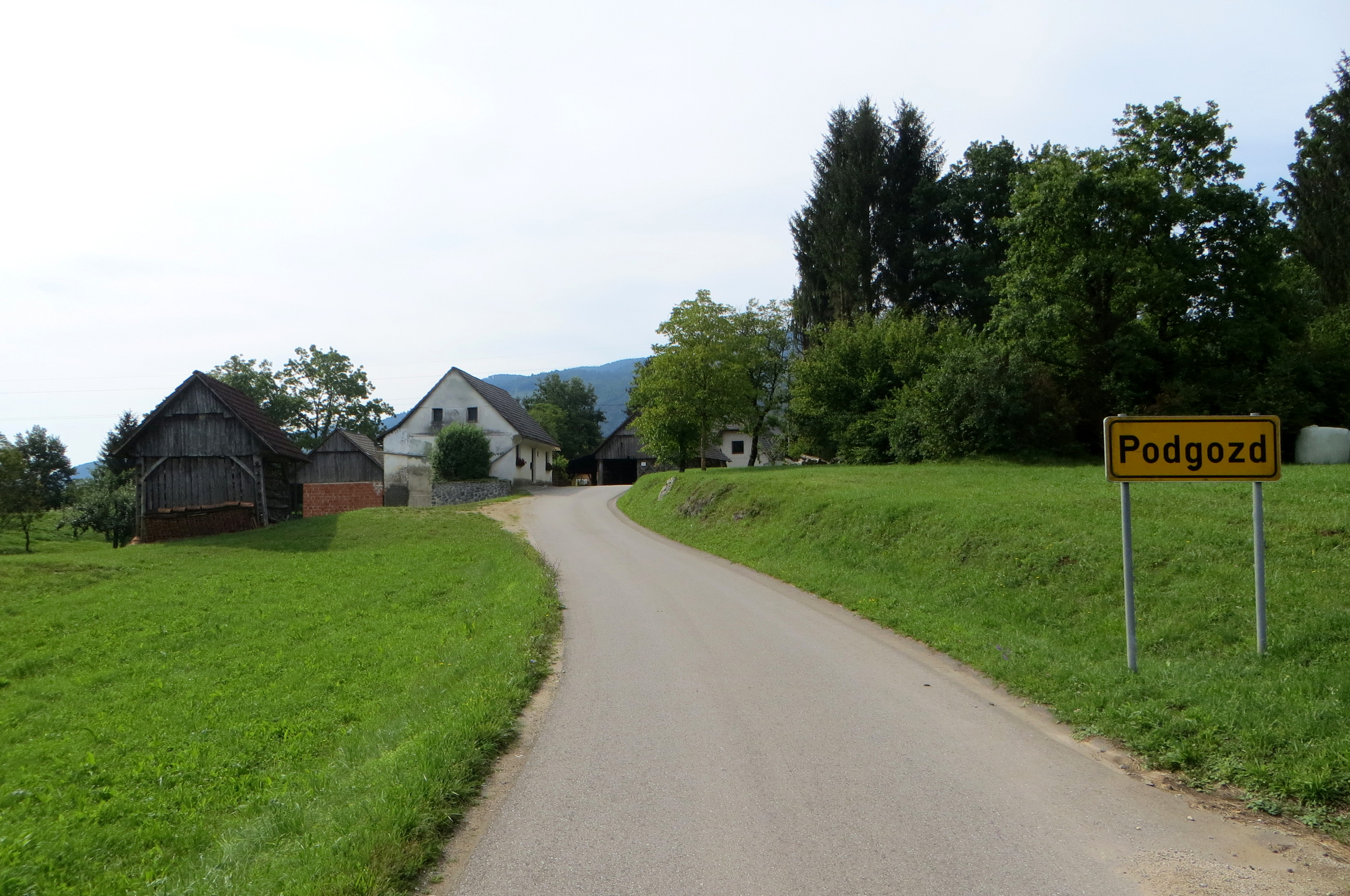

- Location in Slovenia
- Coordinates: 45°48′2.15″N 14°57′54.91″E
- Country: Slovenia
- Traditional region: Lower Carniola
- Statistical region: Southeast Slovenia
- Municipality: Žužemberk

Area
  - Total: 1.7 km^{2} (0.66 sq mi)
- Elevation: 204.7 m (672 ft)

Population (2002)
  - Total: 89

Podgozd (pronounced [pɔdˈɡɔst], German: Unterwald) is a village in the Municipality of Žužemberk in southeastern Slovenia. It lies south of Dvor on the right bank of the Krka River. The area is part of the historical region of Lower Carniola. The municipality is now included in the Southeast Slovenia Statistical Region.
