= Budganja Vas =

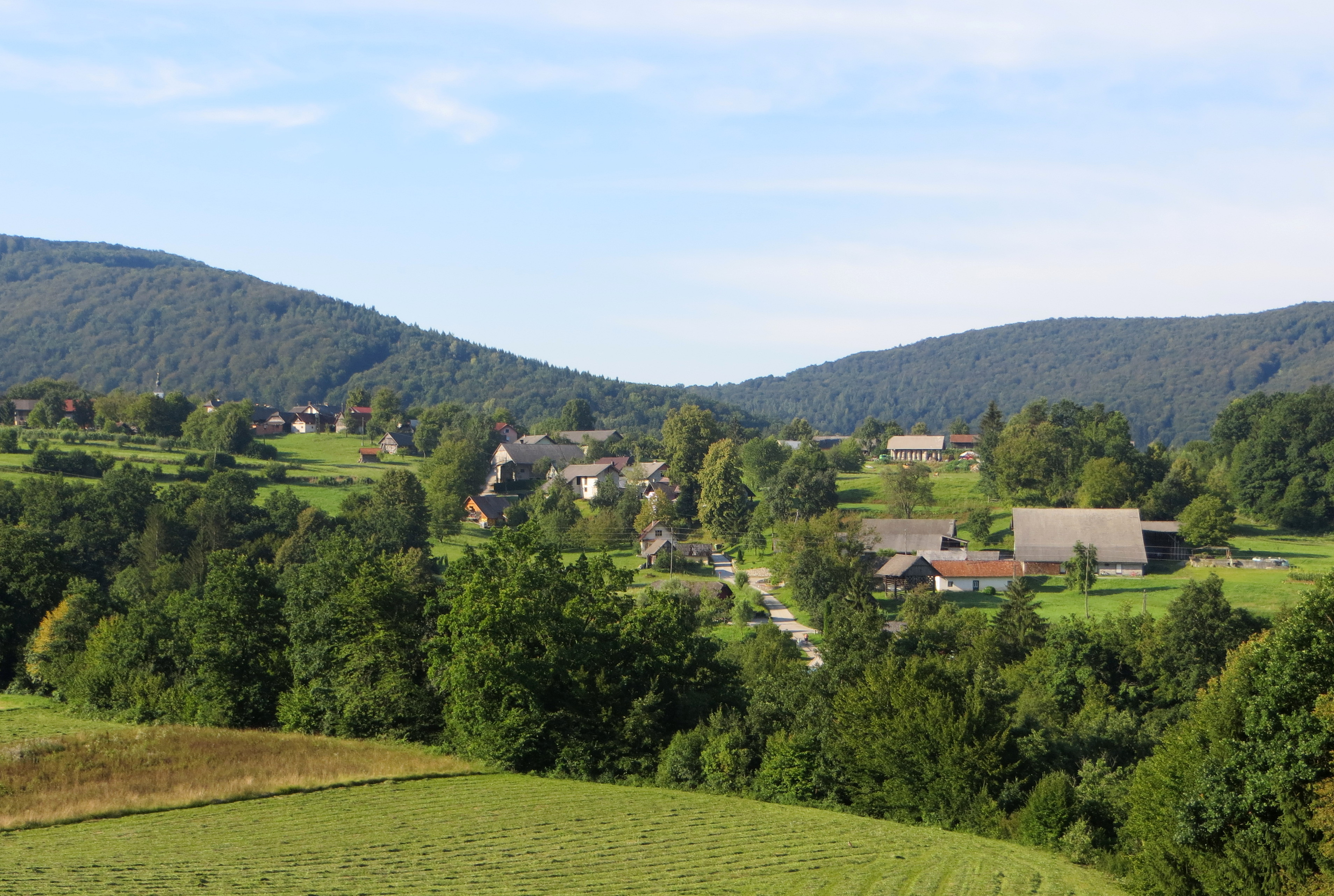

- Location in Slovenia
- Coordinates: 45°50′10.97″N 14°54′32.32″E
- Country: Slovenia
- Traditional region: Lower Carniola
- Statistical region: Southeast Slovenia
- Municipality: Žužemberk

Area
  - Total: 3.74 km^{2} (1.44 sq mi)
- Elevation: 258 m (846 ft)

Population (2002)
  - Total: 97

Budganja Vas (pronounced [budˈɡaːnja ˈʋaːs]; Slovene: Budganja vas) is a village on the right bank of the Krka River in the Municipality of Žužemberk in southeastern Slovenia. The area is part of the historical region of Lower Carniola. The municipality is now included in the Southeast Slovenia Statistical Region.

The local church is dedicated to Saint Oswald (Slovene: sveti Ožbolt) and belongs to the Parish of Žužemberk. It is a medieval building that was restyled in the Baroque in the 17th century. A new belfry was built in the 1990s.
