= Gornji Kot =

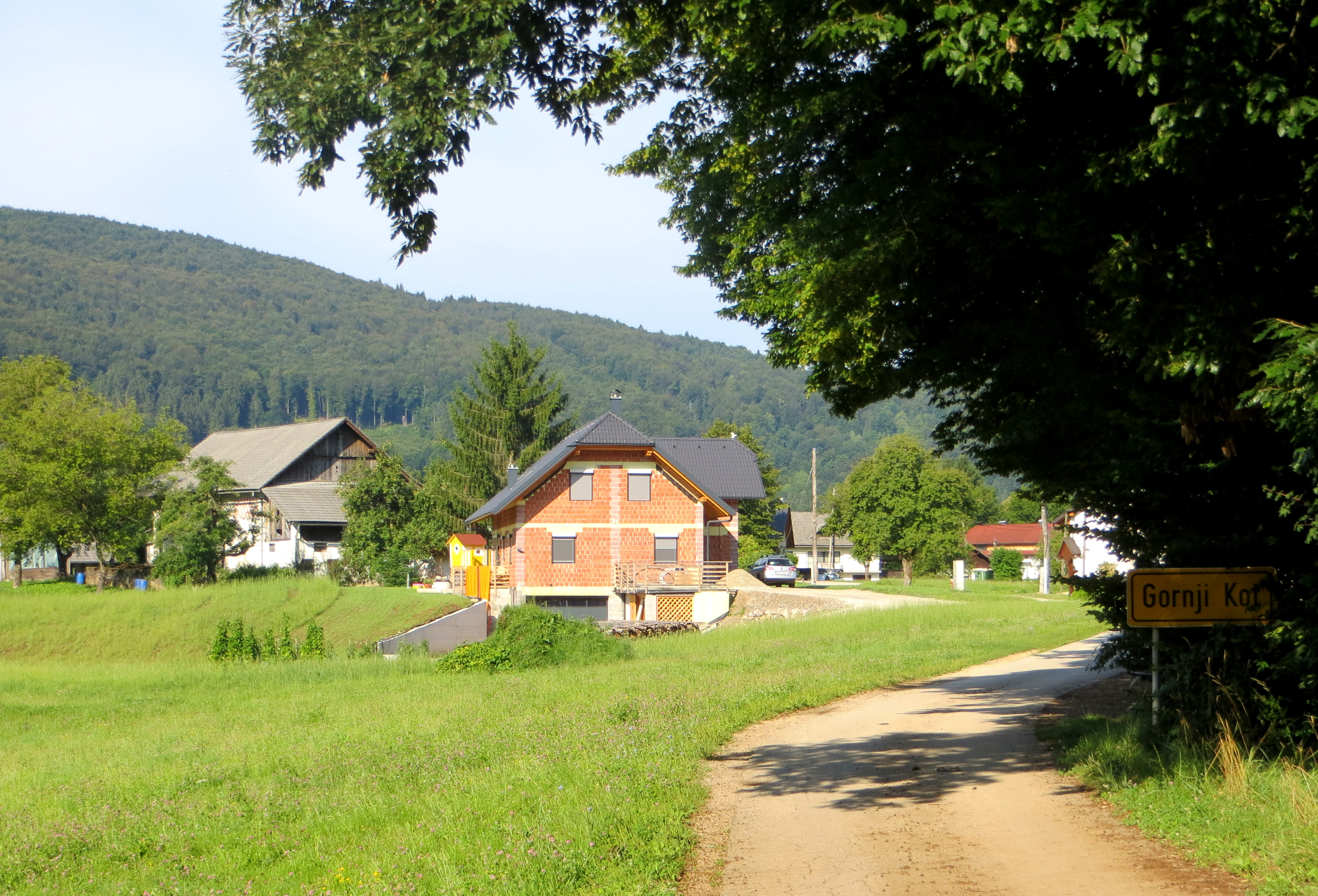

- Location in Slovenia
- Coordinates: 45°47′53.74″N 14°58′16.68″E
- Country: Slovenia
- Traditional region: Lower Carniola
- Statistical region: Southeast Slovenia
- Municipality: Žužemberk

Area
  - Total: 0.62 km^{2} (0.24 sq mi)
- Elevation: 206.2 m (677 ft)

Population (2002)
  - Total: 54

Gornji Kot (pronounced [ˈɡoːɾnji ˈkoːt], German: Oberwinkel) is a small village on the left bank of the Krka River in the Municipality of Žužemberk in southeastern Slovenia. The area is part of the historical region of Lower Carniola. The municipality is now included in the Southeast Slovenia Statistical Region.

The local church is dedicated to Saint Anthony of Padua and belongs to the Parish of Žužemberk. It has a cruciform floor plan was built in the late 17th century.
