= Srednji Lipovec =

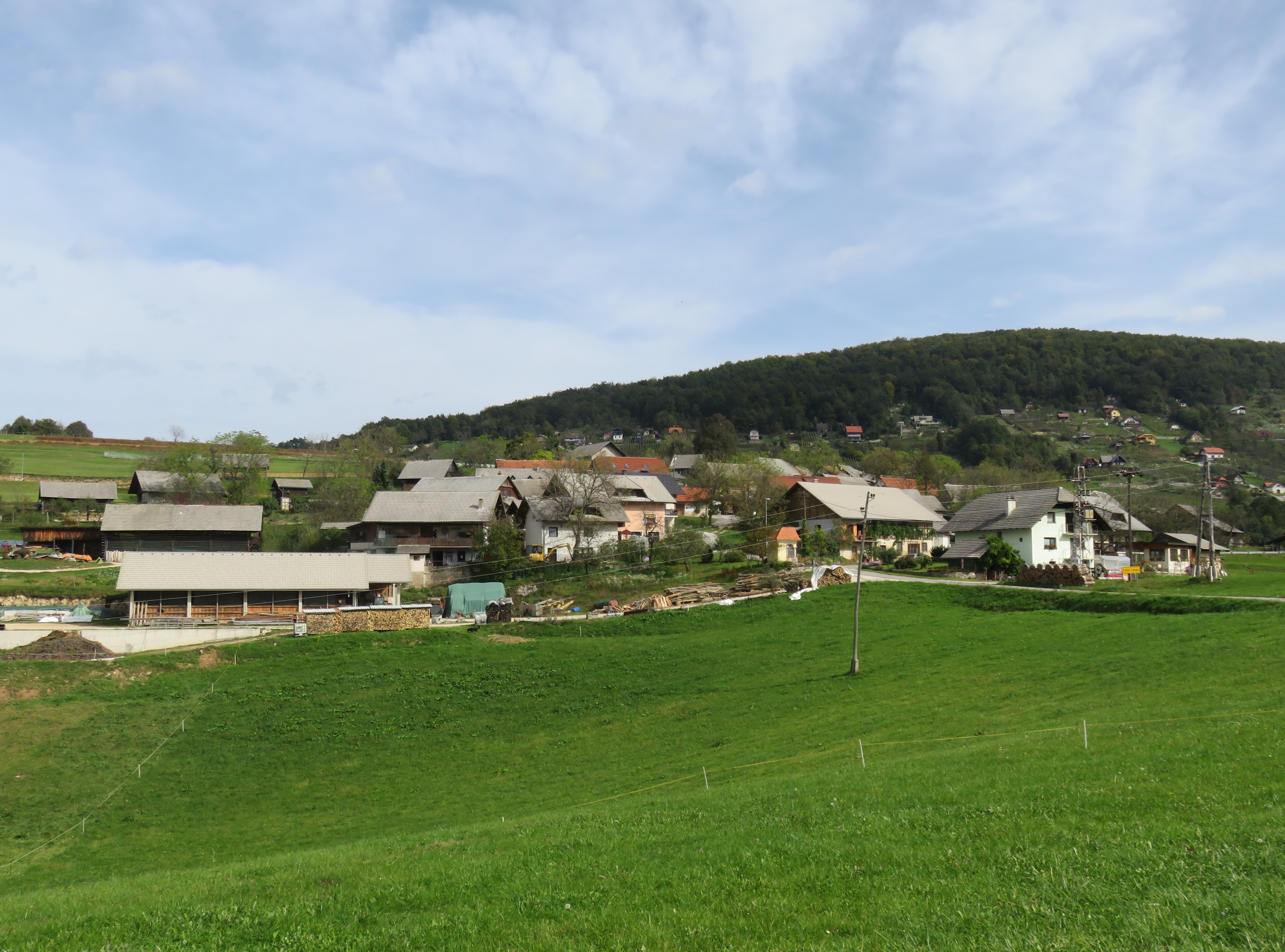

- Location in Slovenia
- Coordinates: 45°49′9.22″N 14°59′52.08″E
- Country: Slovenia
- Traditional region: Lower Carniola
- Statistical region: Southeast Slovenia
- Municipality: Žužemberk

Area
  - Total: 1.24 km^{2} (0.48 sq mi)
- Elevation: 345.6 m (1,134 ft)

Population (2002)
  - Total: 84

Srednji Lipovec (pronounced [ˈsɾeːdnji ˈliːpɔʋəts]) is a settlement in the Municipality of Žužemberk in southeastern Slovenia. The area is part of the historical region of Lower Carniola. The municipality is now included in the Southeast Slovenia Statistical Region.

A small roadside chapel-shrine south of the settlement dates to the 19th century.
