= Sela pri Hinjah =

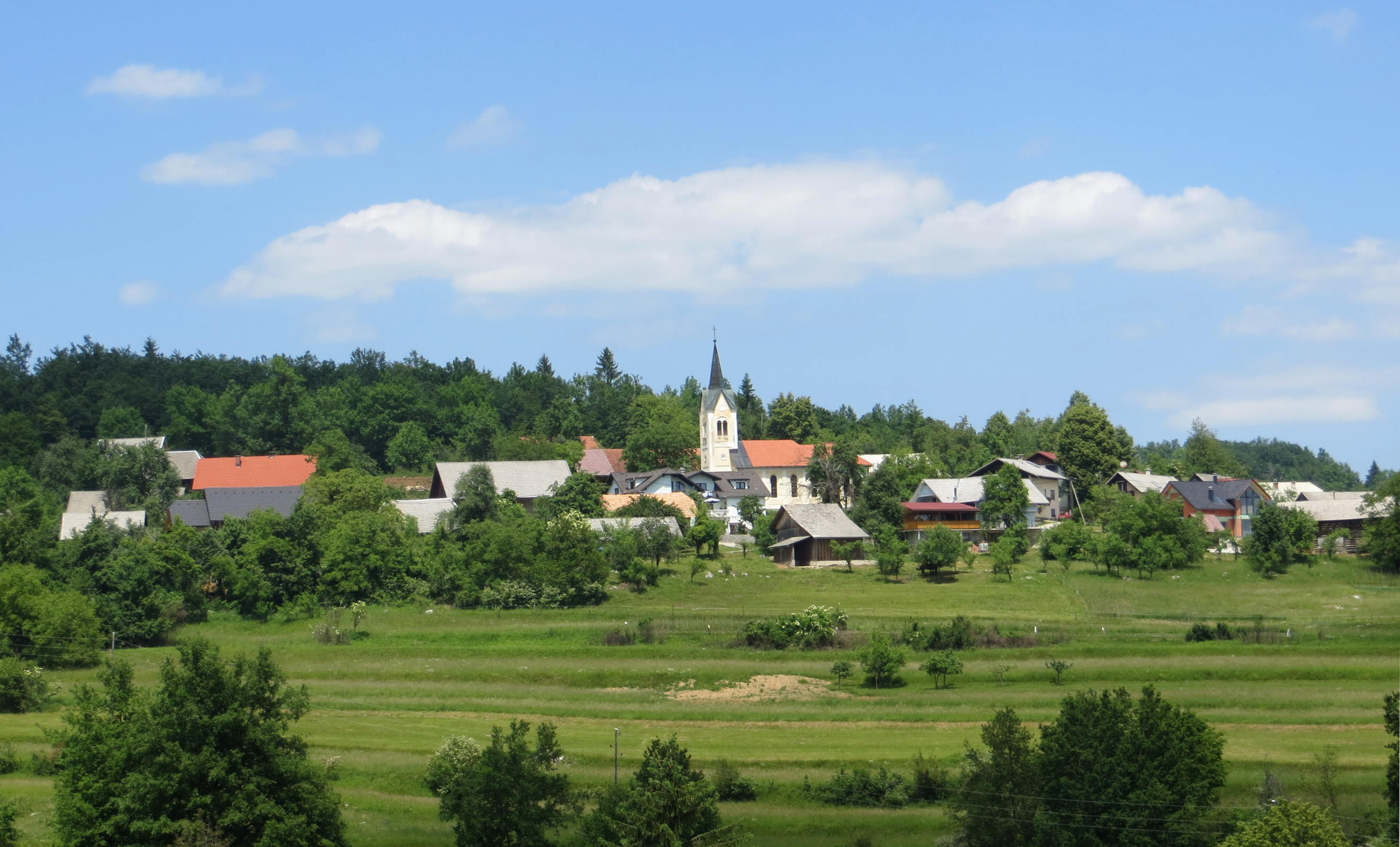

- Location in Slovenia
- Coordinates: 45°47′47.4″N 14°53′14.75″E
- Country: Slovenia
- Traditional region: Lower Carniola
- Statistical region: Southeast Slovenia
- Municipality: Žužemberk

Area
  - Total: 2.78 km^{2} (1.07 sq mi)
- Elevation: 438.2 m (1,438 ft)

Population (2002)
  - Total: 43

Sela pri Hinjah (pronounced [ˈseːla pɾi ˈxiːnjax]) is a village in the Municipality of Žužemberk in southeastern Slovenia. The area is part of the historical region of Lower Carniola. The municipality is now included in the Southeast Slovenia Statistical Region.

== Church ==
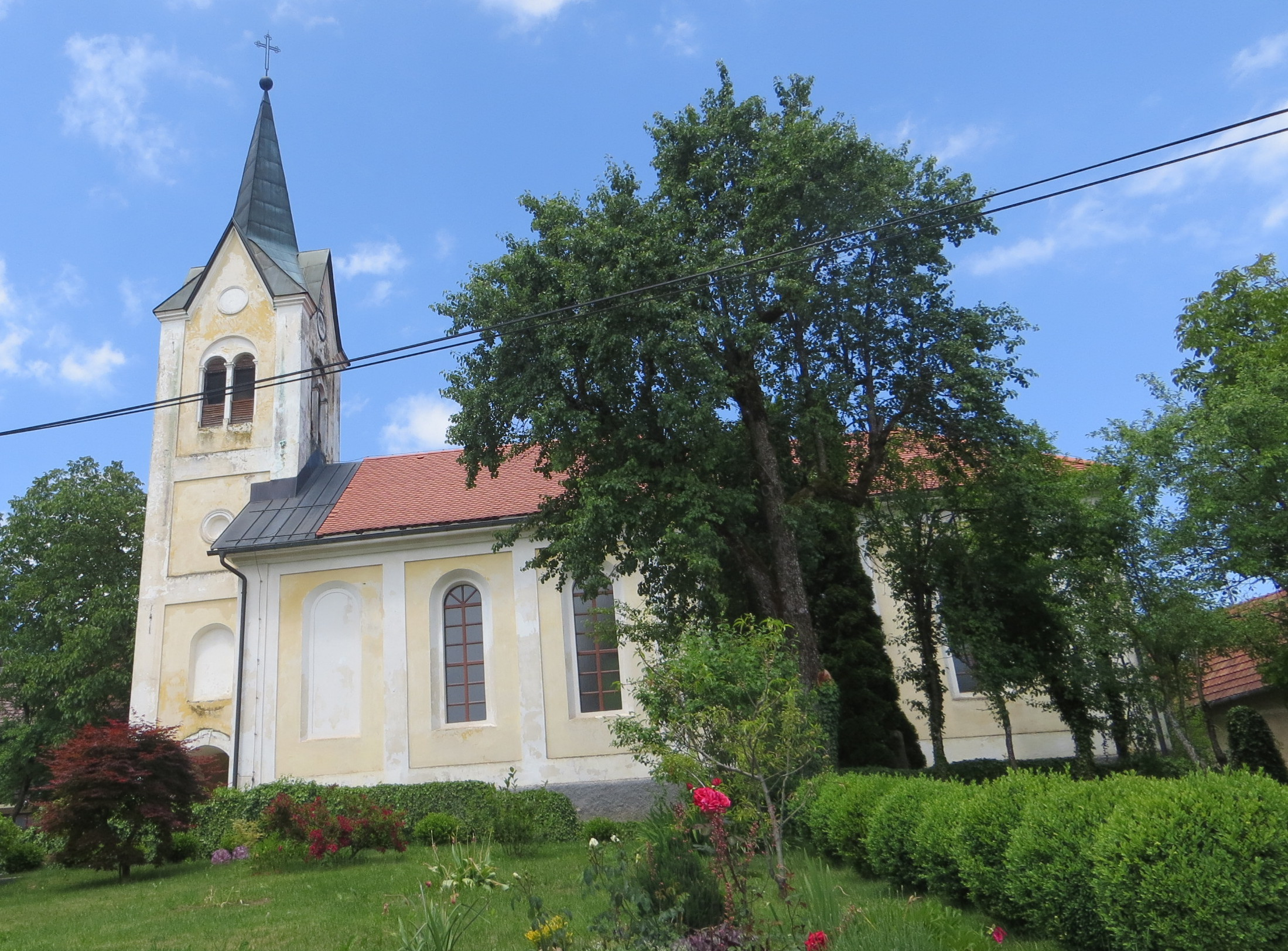
Saint George's Church

The local church is dedicated to Saint George (Slovene: sveti Jurij) and belongs to the Parish of Hinje. It was built in 1901.
