= Lazina =

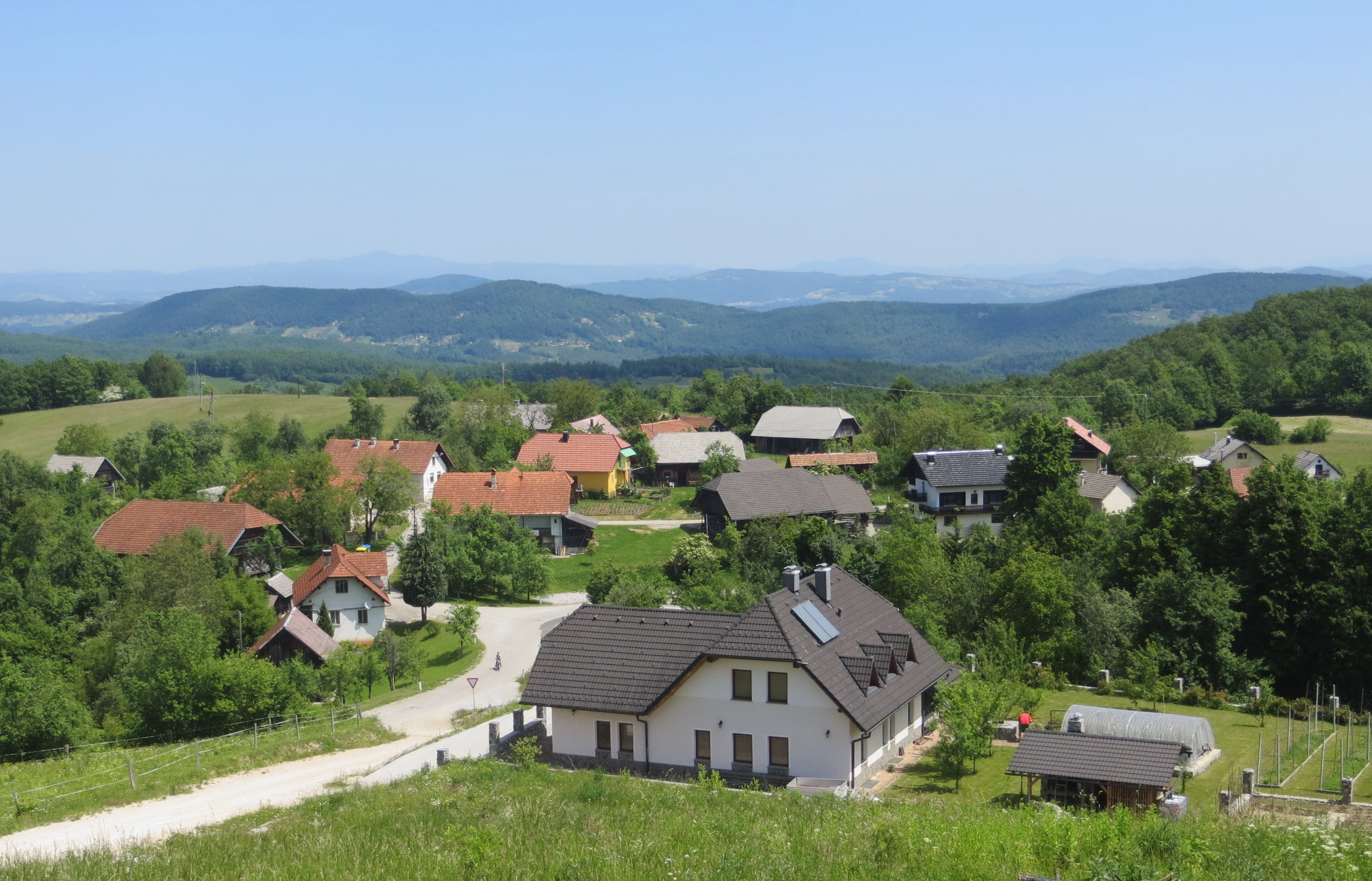

- Location in Slovenia
- Coordinates: 45°46′9.91″N 14°53′28.83″E
- Country: Slovenia
- Traditional region: Lower Carniola
- Statistical region: Southeast Slovenia
- Municipality: Žužemberk

Area
  - Total: 2.33 km^{2} (0.90 sq mi)
- Elevation: 501.1 m (1,644 ft)

Population (2002)
  - Total: 21

Lazina (pronounced [ˈlaːzina]) is a small village east of Hinje in the Municipality of Žužemberk in southeastern Slovenia. The area is part of the historical region of Lower Carniola. The municipality is now included in the Southeast Slovenia Statistical Region.
