= Visejec =

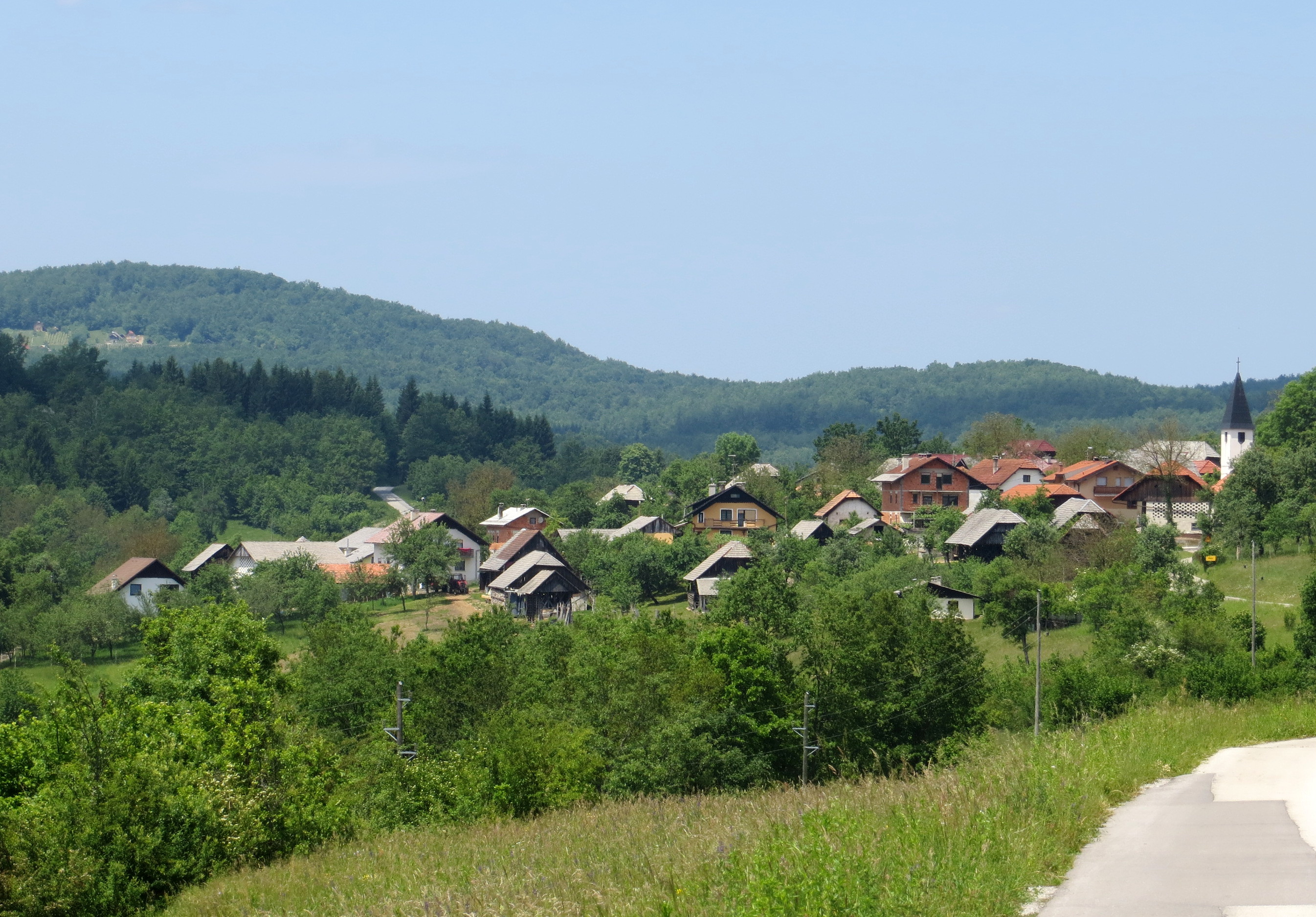

- Location in Slovenia
- Coordinates: 45°48′40.14″N 14°52′14.89″E
- Country: Slovenia
- Traditional region: Lower Carniola
- Statistical region: Southeast Slovenia
- Municipality: Žužemberk

Area
  - Total: 4.29 km^{2} (1.66 sq mi)
- Elevation: 392 m (1,286 ft)

Population (2002)
  - Total: 102

Visejec (pronounced [ʋiˈsɛːjəts] or [ʋiˈseːjəts]) is a small village on the right bank of the Krka River in the Municipality of Žužemberk in southeastern Slovenia. The area is part of the historical region of Lower Carniola. The municipality is now included in the Southeast Slovenia Statistical Region.

The local church is dedicated to Mary Help of Christians and belongs to the Parish of Hinje.
