= Municipality of Žužemberk =

Municipality of Slovenia

Municipality of Žužemberk Občina Žužemberk
- Municipality
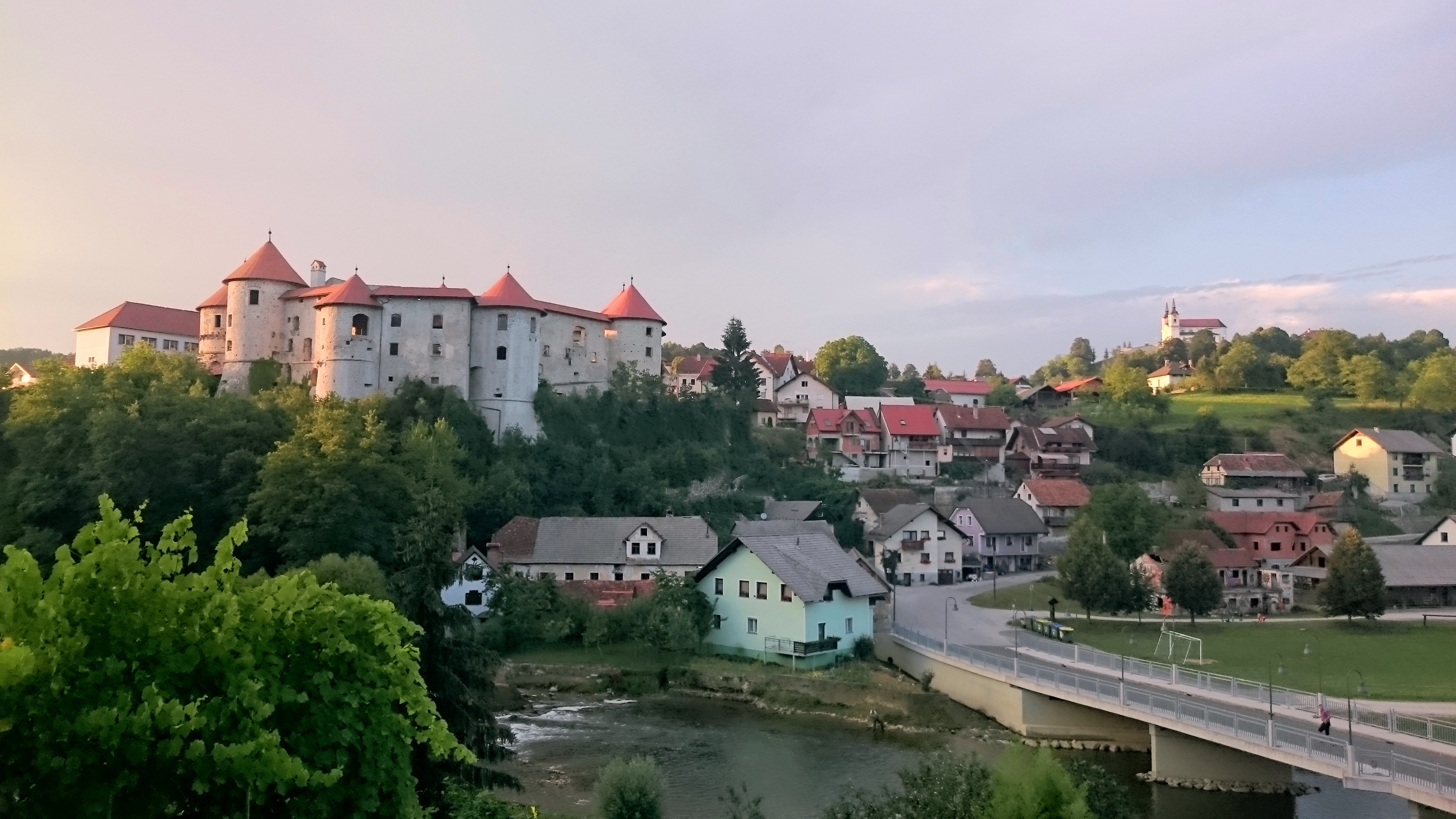

- Location of the Municipality of Žužemberk in Slovenia
- Coordinates: 45°50′N 14°56′E
- Country: Slovenia

Government
  - Mayor: Jože Papež

Area
  - Total: 164.3 km^{2} (63.4 sq mi)

Population (2002)
  - Total: 4,579
  - Density: 27.87/km^{2} (72.18/sq mi)
- Time zone: UTC+01 (CET)
  - Summer (DST): UTC+02 (CEST)
- Website: www.zuzemberk.si

The Municipality of Žužemberk (pronounced [ˈʒuːʒɛmbɛɾk]; Slovene: Občina Žužemberk) is a municipality southeast of the capital of Ljubljana in southeastern Slovenia. Its seat is the town of Žužemberk. The area is part of the traditional region of Lower Carniola. The municipality is now included in the Southeast Slovenia Statistical Region.

== Settlements ==
In addition to the municipal seat of Žužemberk, the municipality also includes the following settlements:

- Boršt pri Dvoru
- Brezova Reber pri Dvoru
- Budganja Vas
- Dešeča Vas
- Dolnji Ajdovec
- Dolnji Kot
- Dolnji Križ
- Drašča Vas
- Dvor
- Gornji Ajdovec
- Gornji Kot
- Gornji Križ
- Gradenc
- Hinje
- Hrib pri Hinjah
- Jama pri Dvoru
- Klečet
- Klopce
- Lašče
- Lazina
- Lopata
- Mačkovec pri Dvoru
- Mali Lipovec
- Malo Lipje
- Pleš
- Plešivica
- Podgozd
- Podlipa
- Poljane pri Žužemberku
- Prapreče
- Prevole
- Ratje
- Reber
- Sadinja Vas pri Dvoru
- Sela pri Ajdovcu
- Sela pri Hinjah
- Šmihel pri Žužemberku
- Srednji Lipovec
- Stavča Vas
- Trebča Vas
- Veliki Lipovec
- Veliko Lipje
- Vinkov Vrh
- Visejec
- Vrh pri Hinjah
- Vrh pri Križu
- Vrhovo pri Žužemberku
- Zafara
- Zalisec
- Žvirče
