= Sela pri Ajdovcu =

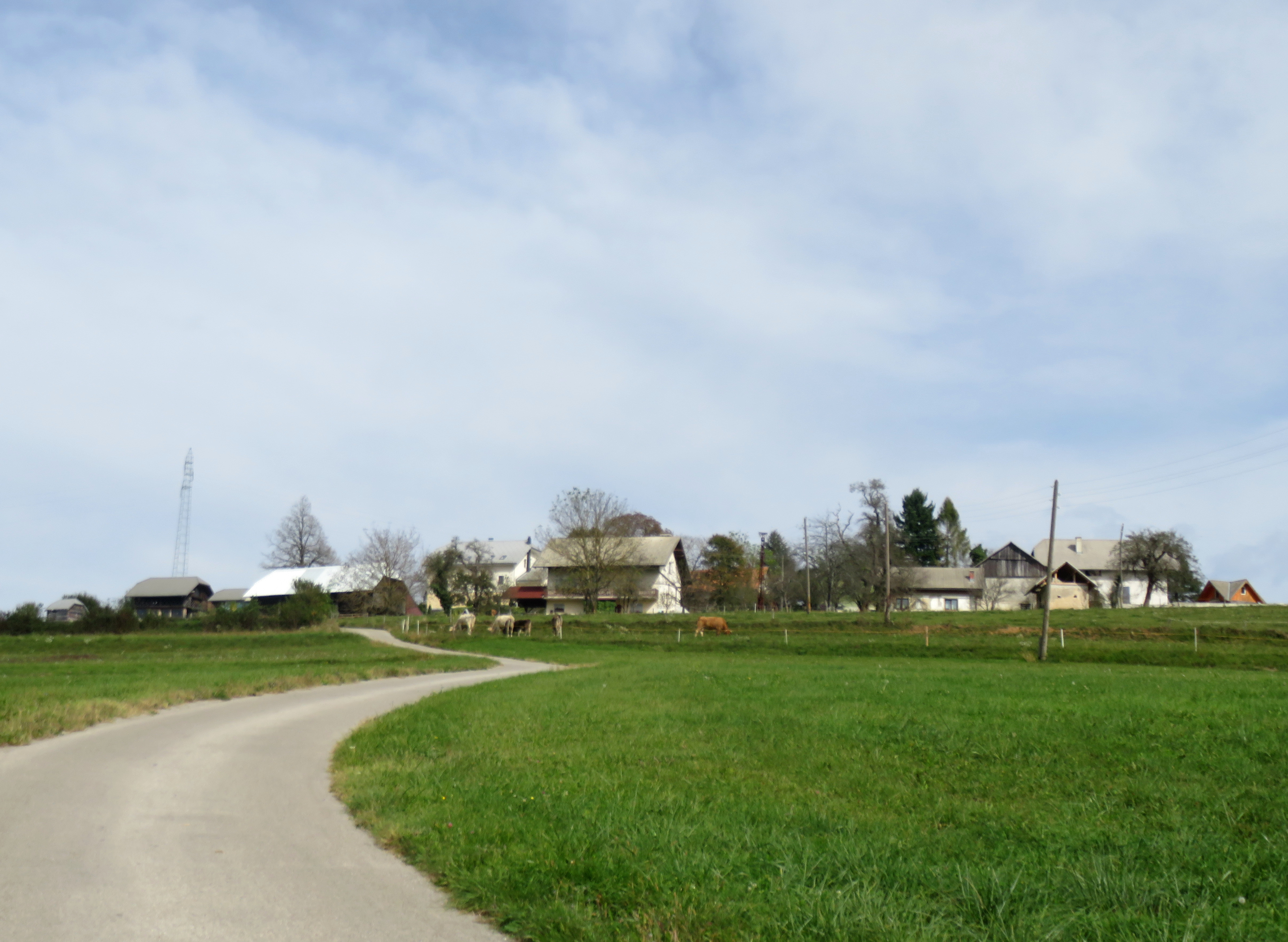

- Location in Slovenia
- Coordinates: 45°48′42.98″N 15°1′7.12″E
- Country: Slovenia
- Traditional region: Lower Carniola
- Statistical region: Southeast Slovenia
- Municipality: Žužemberk

Area
  - Total: 2.05 km^{2} (0.79 sq mi)
- Elevation: 484.6 m (1,590 ft)

Population (2002)
  - Total: 12

Sela pri Ajdovcu (pronounced [ˈseːla pɾi ˈaːi̯dɔu̯tsu]) is a small village in the Municipality of Žužemberk in southeastern Slovenia. The area is part of the historical region of Lower Carniola. The municipality is now included in the Southeast Slovenia Statistical Region.

== Church ==
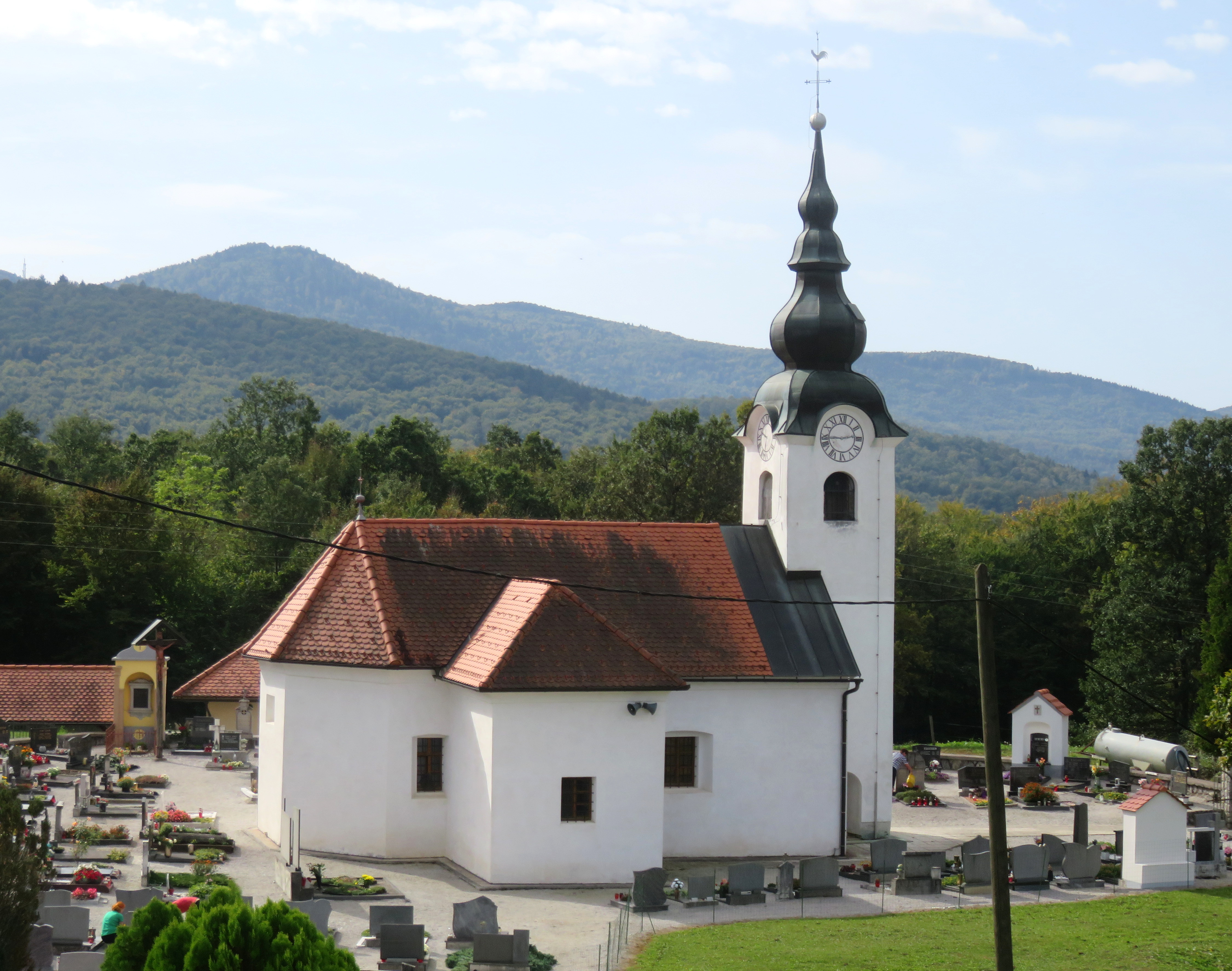
Saint Nicholas's Church

The local church is dedicated to Saint Nicholas and belongs to the Parish of Ajdovec. It was first mentioned in written documents dating to 1526 and was restyled in the Baroque style in the 18th century.
