= Hrib pri Hinjah =

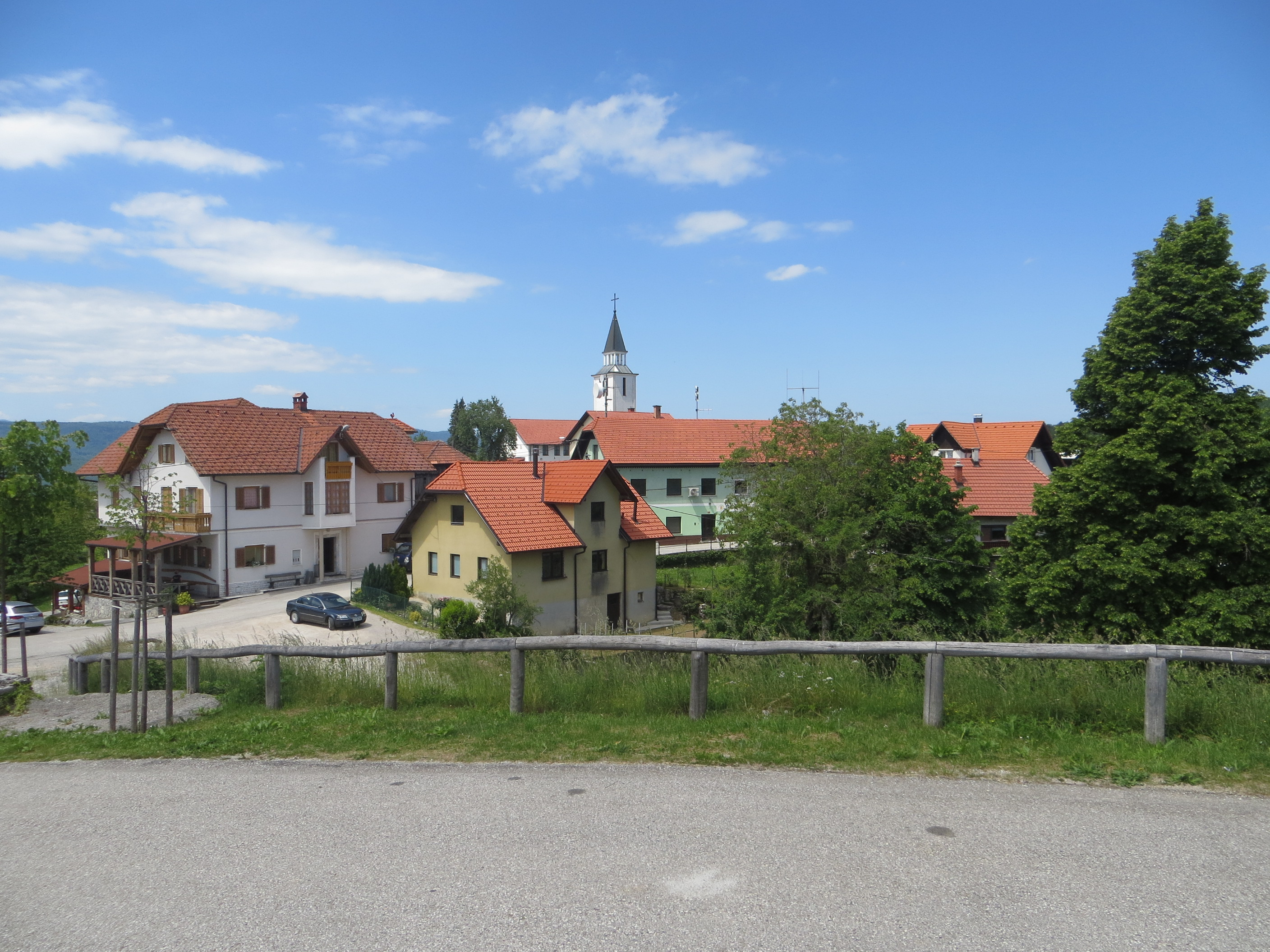

- Location in Slovenia
- Coordinates: 45°46′1.81″N 14°53′21.9″E
- Country: Slovenia
- Traditional region: Lower Carniola
- Statistical region: Southeast Slovenia
- Municipality: Žužemberk

Area
  - Total: 1.42 km^{2} (0.55 sq mi)
- Elevation: 528.3 m (1,733 ft)

Population (2002)
  - Total: 26

Hrib pri Hinjah (pronounced [ˈxɾiːp pɾi ˈxiːnjax]) is a small settlement just east of Hinje in the Municipality of Žužemberk in southeastern Slovenia. The area is part of the historical region of Lower Carniola. The municipality is now included in the Southeast Slovenia Statistical Region.
