= Gornji Ajdovec =

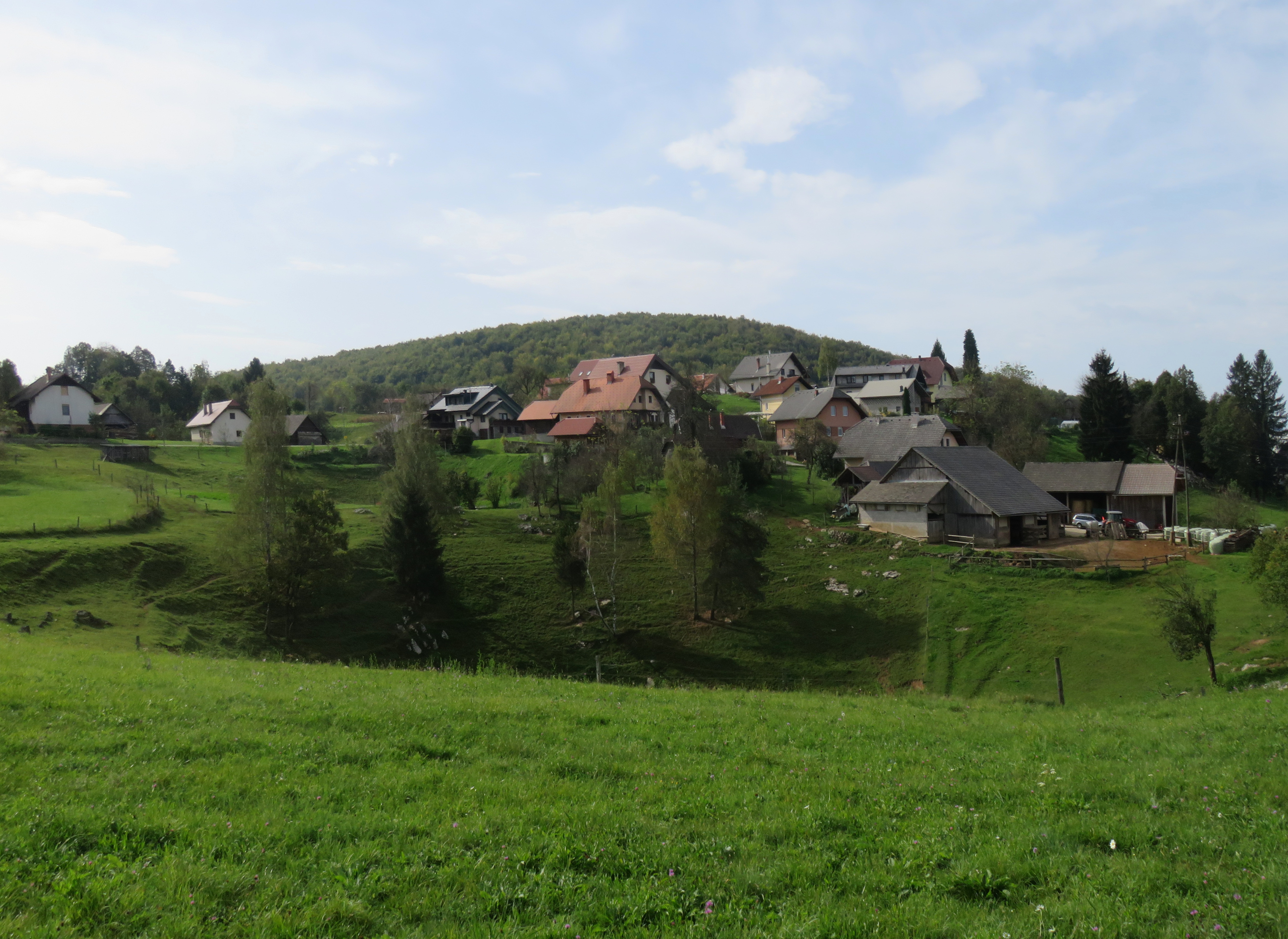

- Location in Slovenia
- Coordinates: 45°49′34.49″N 15°0′50.93″E
- Country: Slovenia
- Traditional region: Lower Carniola
- Statistical region: Southeast Slovenia
- Municipality: Žužemberk

Area
  - Total: 1.08 km^{2} (0.42 sq mi)
- Elevation: 454.9 m (1,492 ft)

Population (2002)
  - Total: 47

Gornji Ajdovec (pronounced [ˈɡoːɾnji ˈaːi̯dɔʋəts], in older sources Gorenja Ajdovica, German: Oberhaidowitz) is a settlement in the Municipality of Žužemberk in southeastern Slovenia. It lies in the hills to the east of Dvor in the historical region of Lower Carniola. The municipality is now included in the Southeast Slovenia Statistical Region.
