= Klečet =

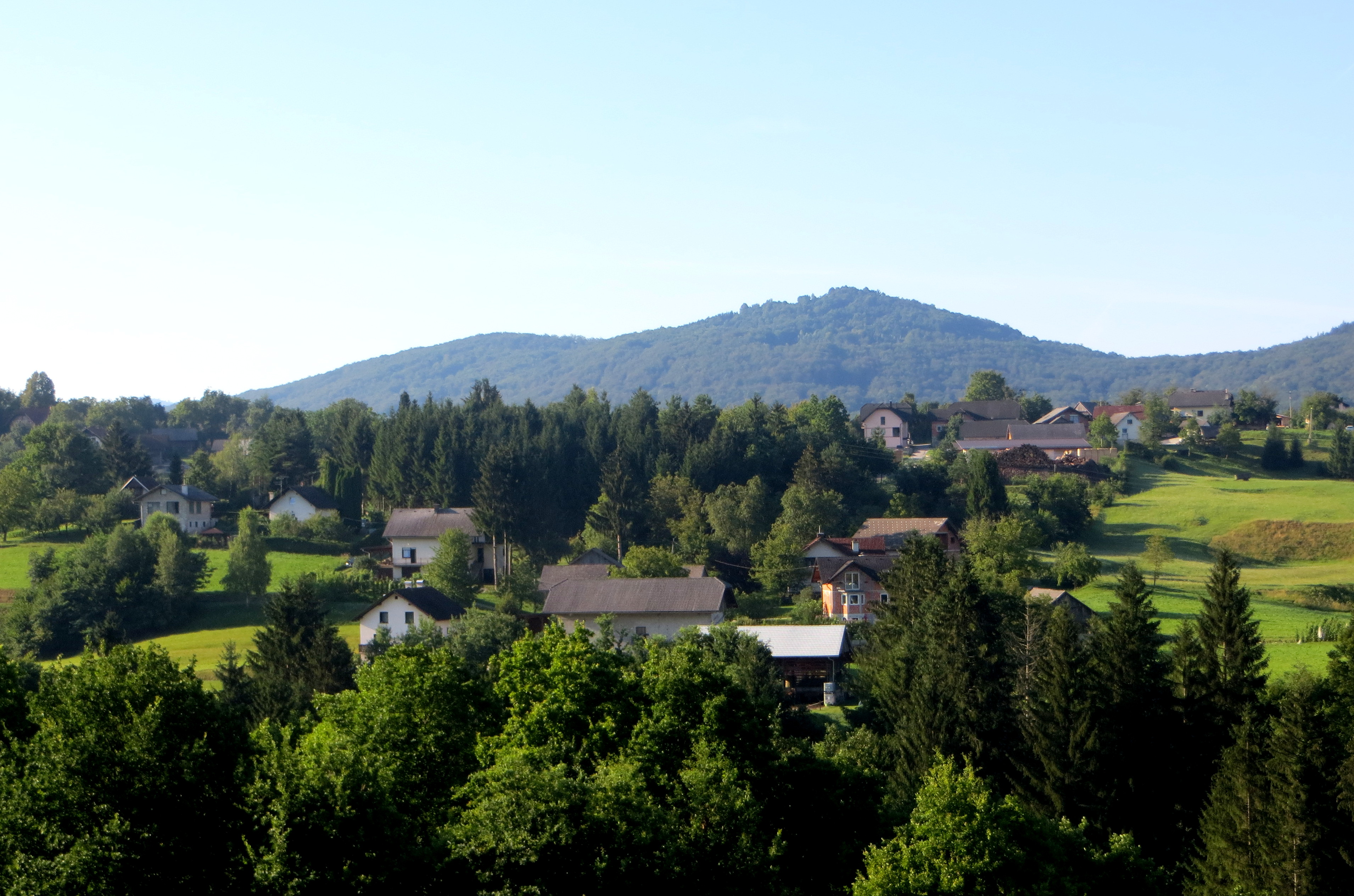

- Location in Slovenia
- Coordinates: 45°51′1.07″N 14°52′32.65″E
- Country: Slovenia
- Traditional region: Lower Carniola
- Statistical region: Southeast Slovenia
- Municipality: Žužemberk

Area
  - Total: 1.84 km^{2} (0.71 sq mi)
- Elevation: 280.7 m (921 ft)

Population (2002)
  - Total: 138

Klečet (pronounced [ˈkleːtʃɛt]) is a small village in the Municipality of Žužemberk in southeastern Slovenia. It lies on the right bank of the Krka River in the historical region of Lower Carniola. The municipality is included in the Southeast Slovenia Statistical Region.
