= Zalisec =

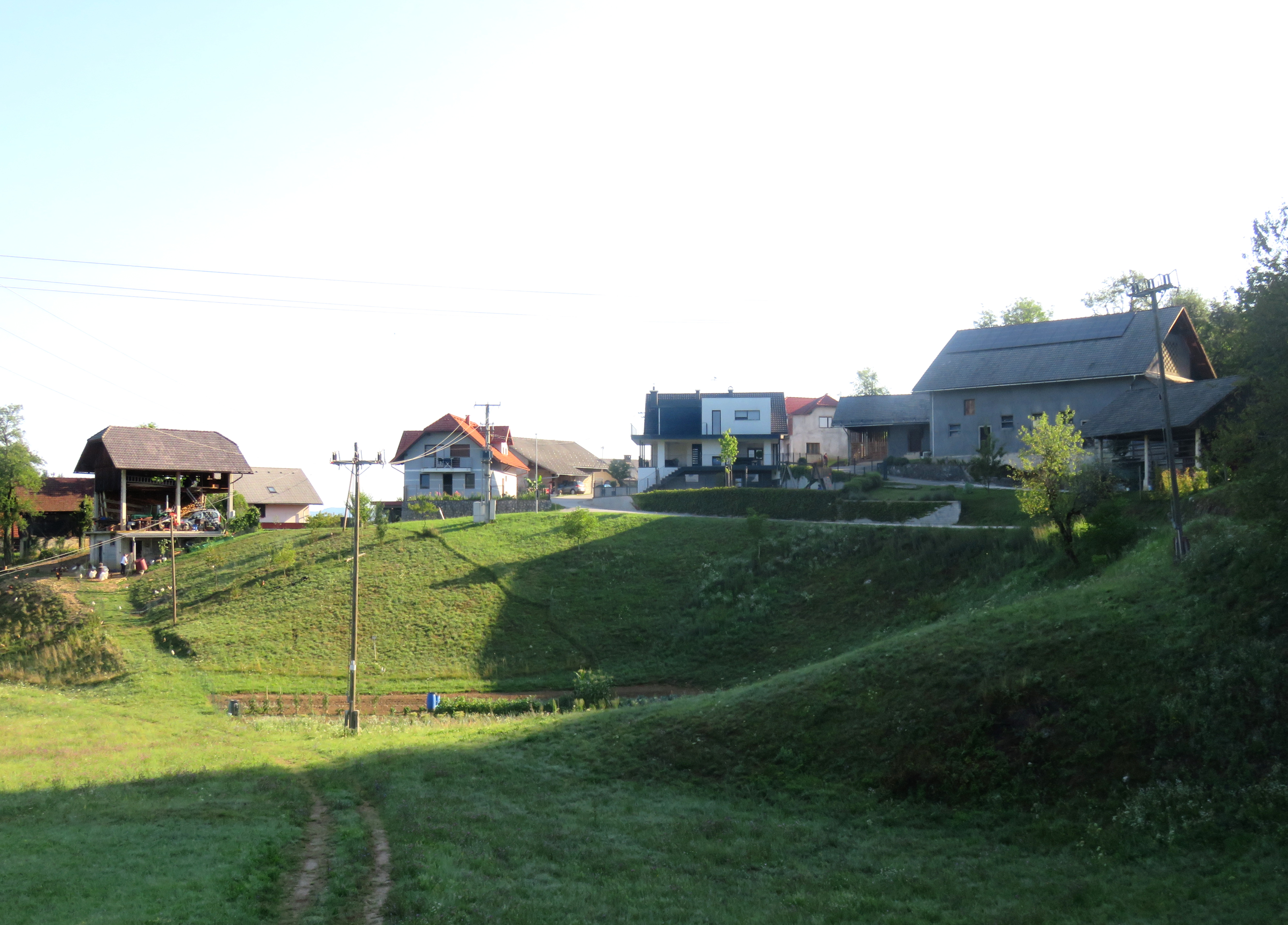

- Location in Slovenia
- Coordinates: 45°51′31.4″N 14°56′14.23″E
- Country: Slovenia
- Traditional region: Lower Carniola
- Statistical region: Southeast Slovenia
- Municipality: Žužemberk

Area
  - Total: 2.61 km^{2} (1.01 sq mi)
- Elevation: 315.8 m (1,036 ft)

Population (2002)
  - Total: 49

Zalisec (pronounced [zaˈliːsəts]) is a small settlement in the Municipality of Žužemberk in the historical region of Lower Carniola in southeastern Slovenia. The municipality is now included in the Southeast Slovenia Statistical Region.
