= Poljane pri Žužemberku =

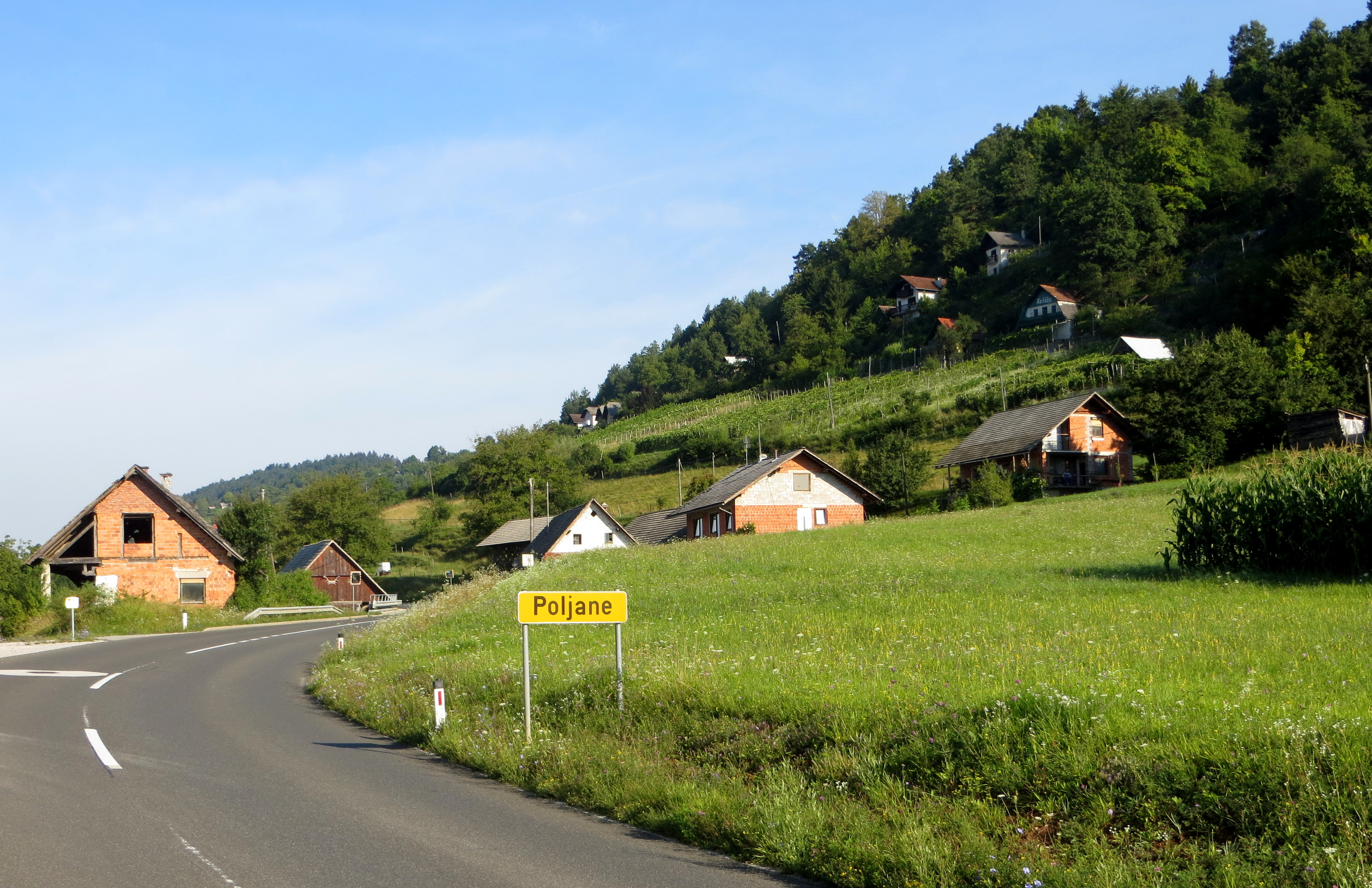

- Location in Slovenia
- Coordinates: 45°51′16.34″N 14°53′25″E
- Country: Slovenia
- Traditional region: Lower Carniola
- Statistical region: Southeast Slovenia
- Municipality: Žužemberk

Area
  - Total: 0.48 km^{2} (0.19 sq mi)
- Elevation: 271 m (889 ft)

Population (2002)
  - Total: 27

Poljane pri Žužemberku (pronounced [pɔˈljaːnɛ pɾi ˈʒuːʒɛmbɛɾku]) is a small settlement on the left bank of the Krka River in the Municipality of Žužemberk in southeastern Slovenia. The area belongs to the traditional region of Lower Carniola. The municipality is now included in the Southeast Slovenia Statistical Region.

== Name ==
The name of the settlement was changed from Poljane to Poljane pri Žužemberku in 1953.
