= Dešeča Vas =

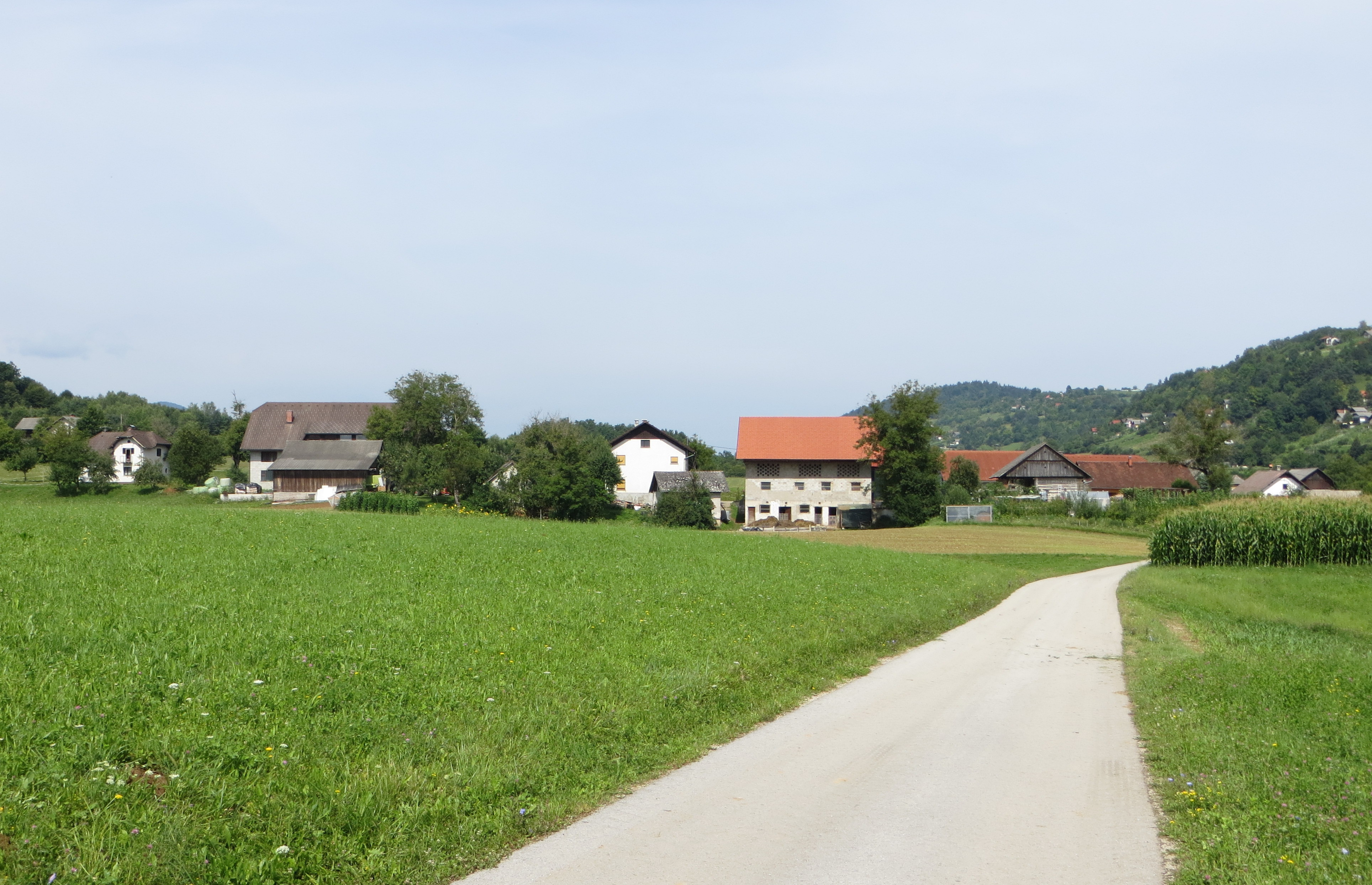

- Location in Slovenia
- Coordinates: 45°51′0.17″N 14°53′44.5″E
- Country: Slovenia
- Traditional region: Lower Carniola
- Statistical region: Southeast Slovenia
- Municipality: Žužemberk

Area
  - Total: 2.05 km^{2} (0.79 sq mi)
- Elevation: 235.4 m (772 ft)

Population (2002)
  - Total: 86

Dešeča Vas (pronounced [dɛˈʃeːtʃa ˈʋaːs]; Slovene: Dešeča vas) is a village on the right bank of the Krka River northwest of Žužemberk in southeastern Slovenia. The area is part of the historical region of Lower Carniola. The entire Municipality of Žužemberk is now included in the Southeast Slovenia Statistical Region.
