= Vrh pri Križu =

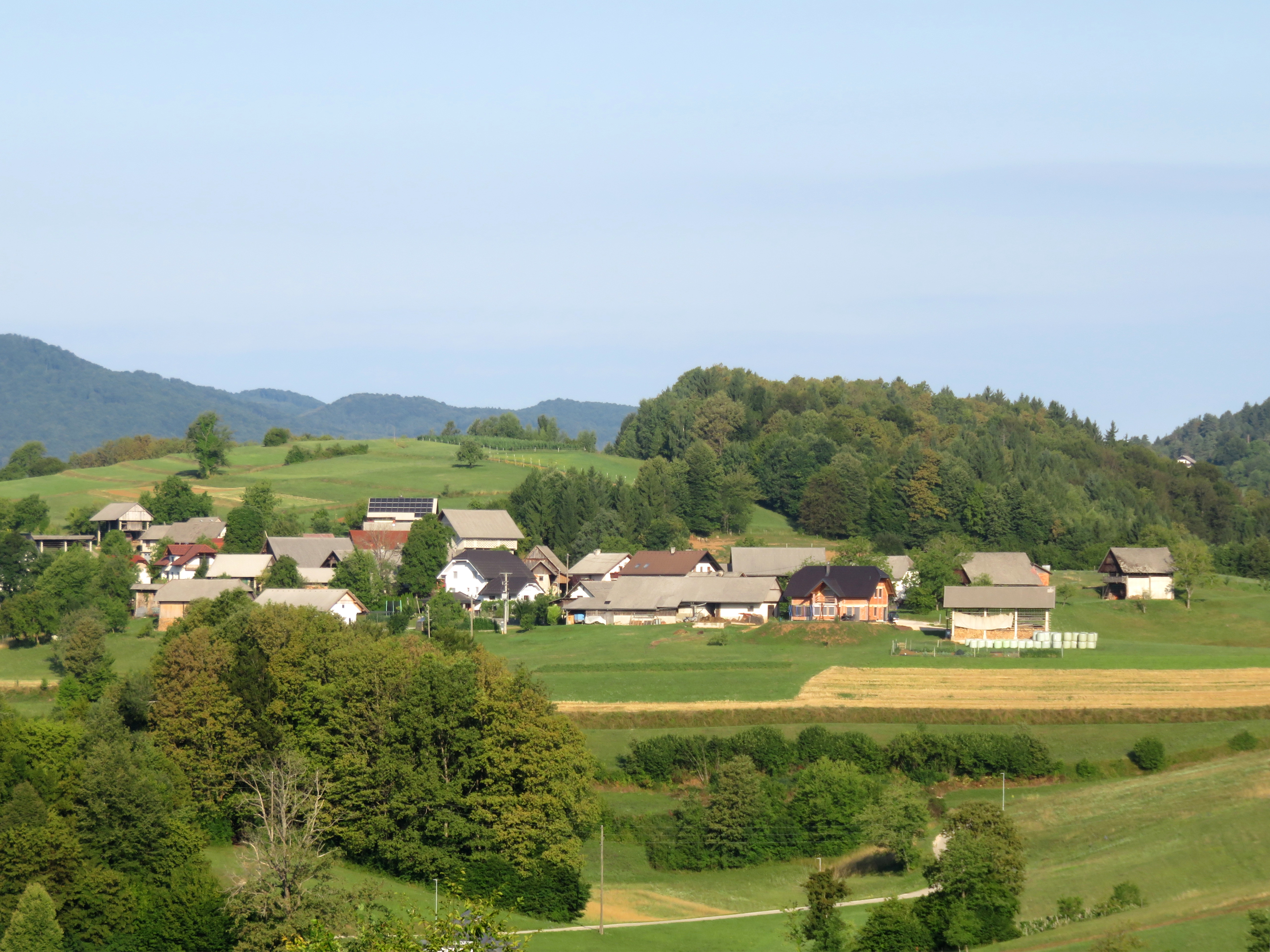

- Location in Slovenia
- Coordinates: 45°51′32.23″N 14°53′44.44″E
- Country: Slovenia
- Traditional region: Lower Carniola
- Statistical region: Southeast Slovenia
- Municipality: Žužemberk

Area
  - Total: 1.5 km^{2} (0.58 sq mi)
- Elevation: 342.7 m (1,124 ft)

Population (2002)
  - Total: 48

Vrh pri Križu (pronounced [ˈʋəɾx pɾi ˈkɾiːʒu]) is a village in the Municipality of Žužemberk in southeastern Slovenia. It lies above the left bank of the Krka River northwest of Žužemberk. The area is part of the historical region of Lower Carniola. The municipality is now included in the Southeast Slovenia Statistical Region.

== Church ==
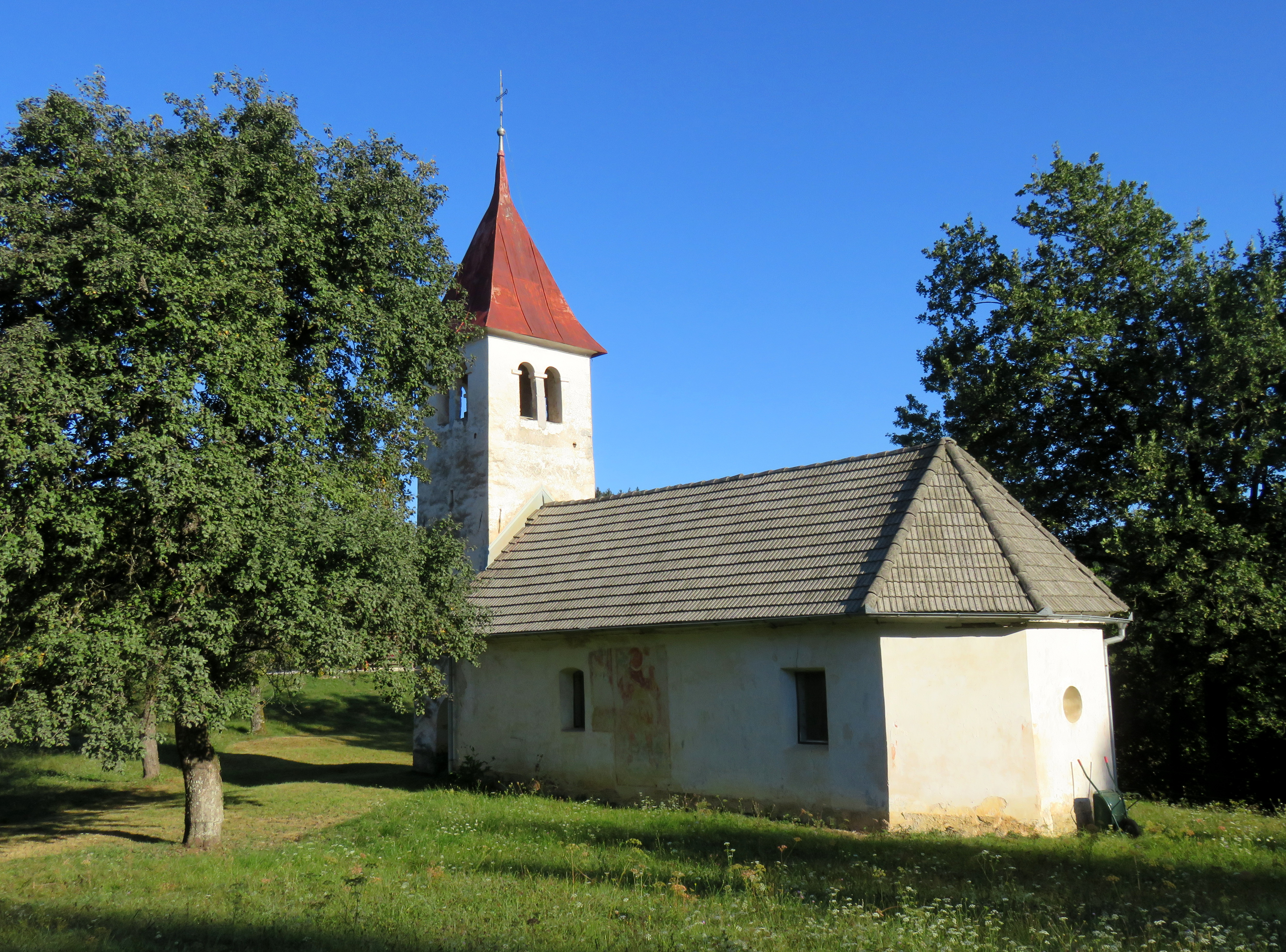
Saint Margaret's Church

The local church built outside the settlement to the northwest is dedicated to Saint Margaret (Slovene: sveta Marjeta) and belongs to the Parish of Žužemberk. It is a medieval building that was restyled in the Baroque style in the early 18th century.
