= Vrh pri Hinjah =

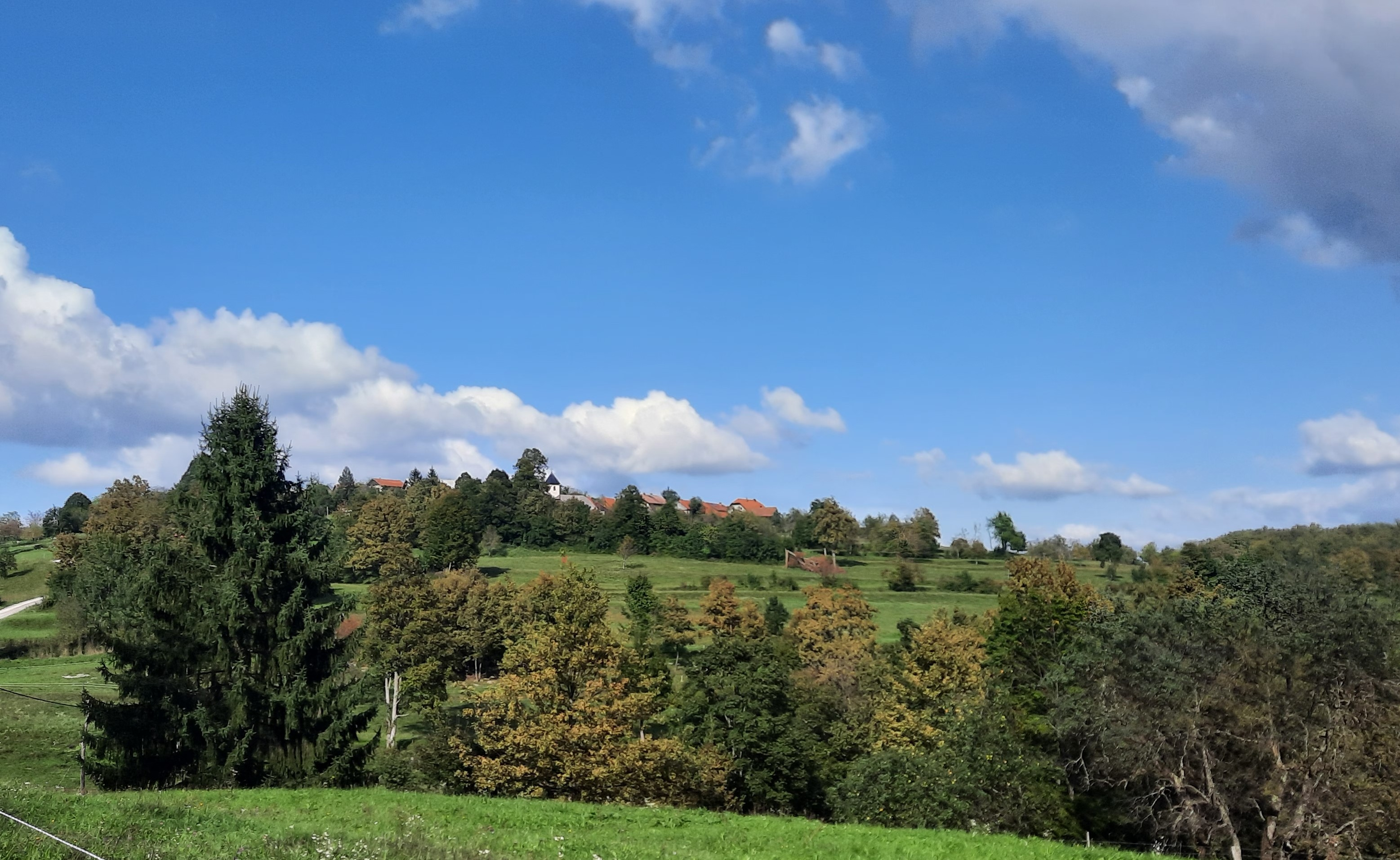

- Location in Slovenia
- Coordinates: 45°48′5.88″N 14°53′30.92″E
- Country: Slovenia
- Traditional region: Lower Carniola
- Statistical region: Southeast Slovenia
- Municipality: Žužemberk

Area
  - Total: 2.39 km^{2} (0.92 sq mi)
- Elevation: 472.3 m (1,550 ft)

Population (2002)
  - Total: 49

Vrh pri Hinjah (pronounced [ˈʋəɾx pɾi ˈxiːnjax]) is a small village in the Municipality of Žužemberk in southeastern Slovenia. The area is part of the historical region of Lower Carniola. The municipality is now included in the Southeast Slovenia Statistical Region.

== Name ==
The name of the settlement was changed from Vrh to Vrh pri Hinjah in 1953.

== Church ==
The local church is dedicated to Saint Thomas and belongs to the Parish of Hinje. It is a small 17th-century building with a 19th-century altar.
