= Šmihel pri Žužemberku =

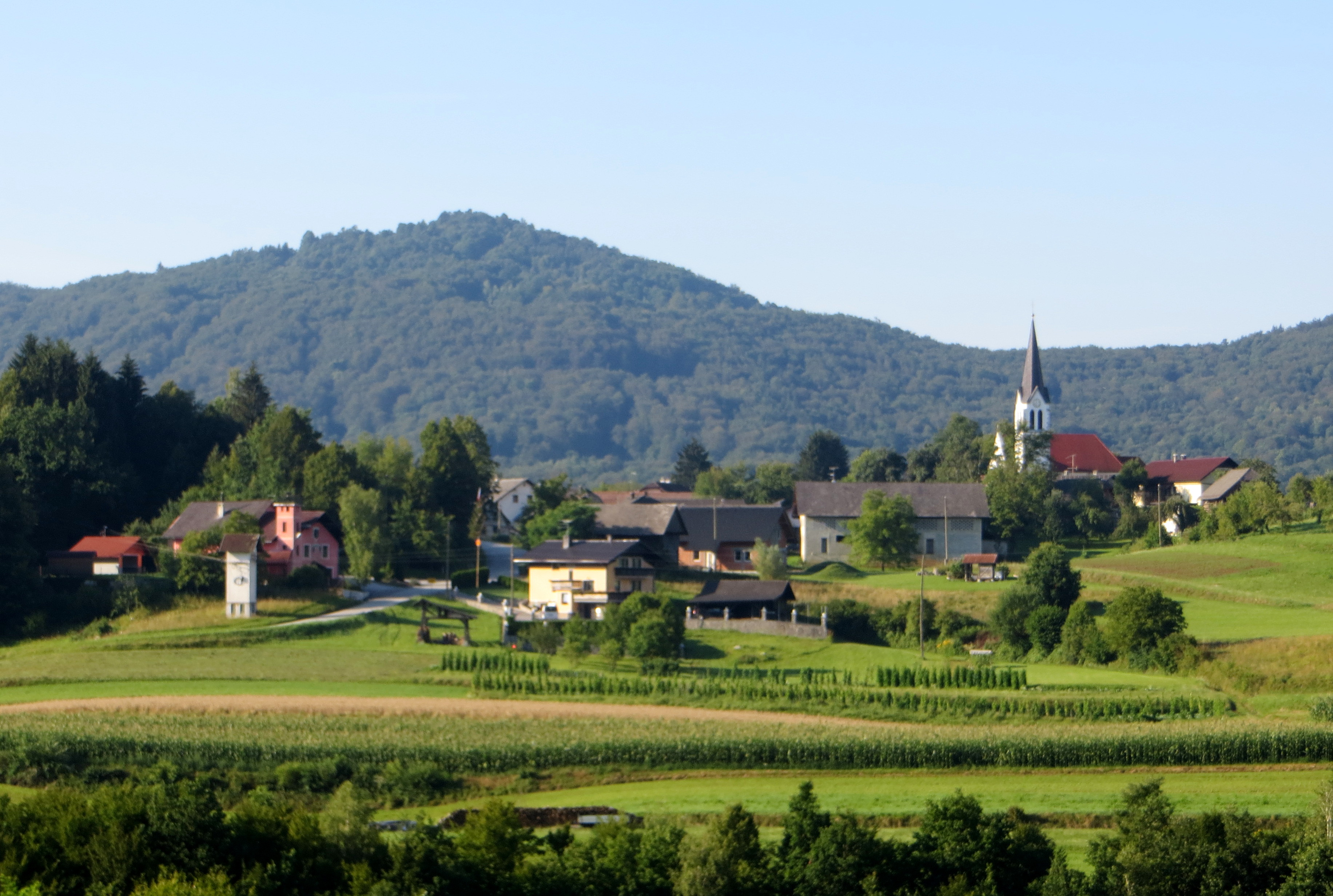

- Location in Slovenia
- Coordinates: 45°50′57.2″N 14°52′53.51″E
- Country: Slovenia
- Traditional region: Lower Carniola
- Statistical region: Southeast Slovenia
- Municipality: Žužemberk

Area
  - Total: 1.8 km^{2} (0.69 sq mi)
- Elevation: 273.8 m (898 ft)

Population (2002)
  - Total: 110

Šmihel pri Žužemberku (pronounced [ʃmiˈxeːu̯ pɾi ˈʒuːʒɛmbɛɾku]) is a village on the right bank of the Krka River in the Municipality of Žužemberk in southeastern Slovenia. The area is part of the historical region of Lower Carniola. The municipality is now included in the Southeast Slovenia Statistical Region.

== Name ==
The name of the settlement was changed from Šmihel to Šmihel pri Žužemberku in 1955.

== Church ==
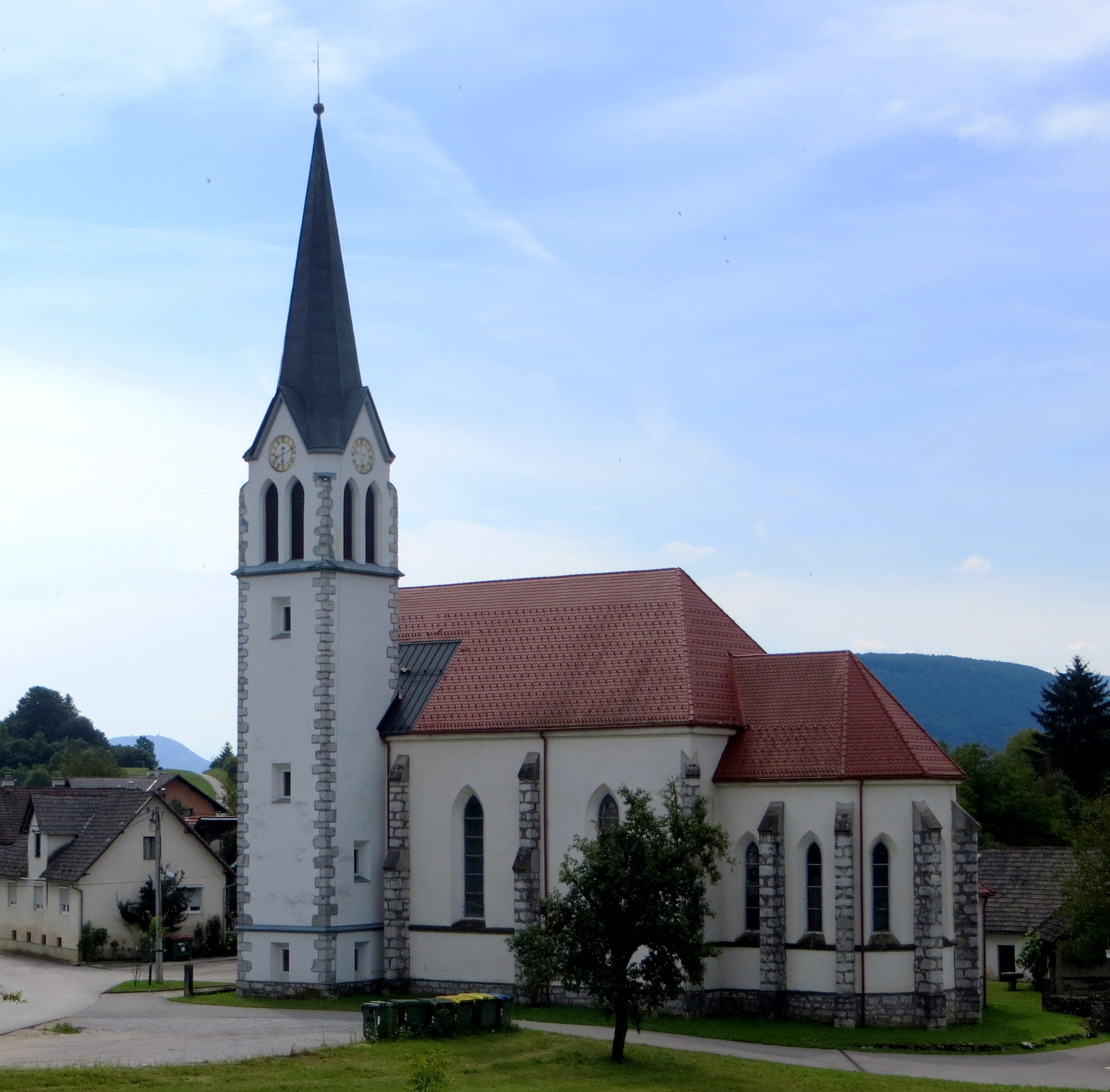
Archangel Michael Church

The local church from which the settlement gets its name is dedicated to Saint Michael and belongs to the Parish of Žužemberk. It was built in 1908 on the site of a previous church first mentioned in written documents dating to 1136.
