= Koglo =

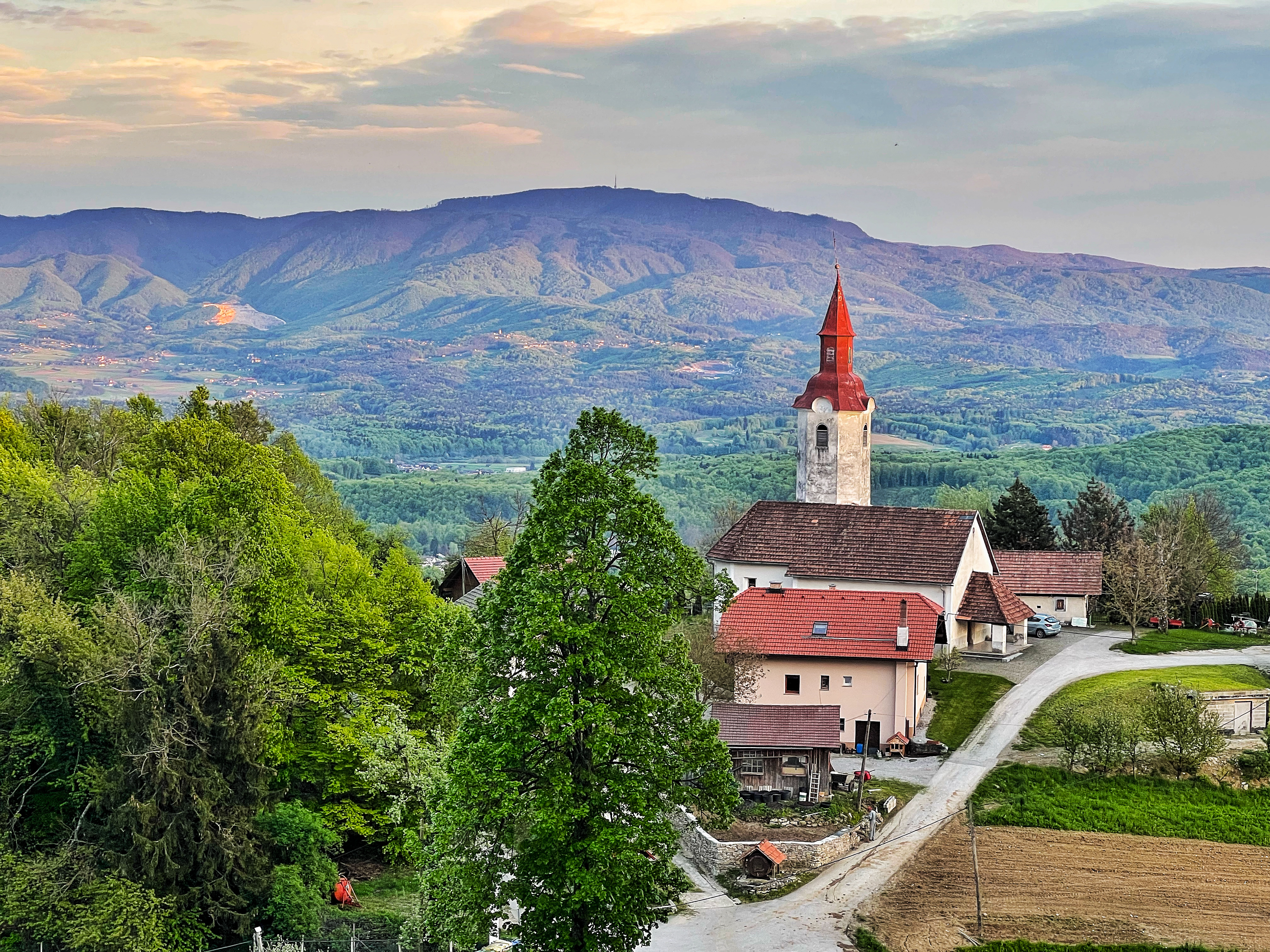
- Koglo with St. Leonard's Church

- Location in Slovenia
- Coordinates: 45°53′29.84″N 15°13′22.48″E
- Country: Slovenia
- Traditional region: Lower Carniola
- Statistical region: Southeast Slovenia
- Municipality: Šmarješke Toplice

Area
  - Total: 1.23 km^{2} (0.47 sq mi)
- Elevation: 403.6 m (1,324 ft)

Population (2002)
  - Total: 43

Koglo (pronounced [ˈkoːɡlɔ]) is a settlement in the Municipality of Šmarješke Toplice in southeastern Slovenia. The area is part of the historical region of Lower Carniola. The municipality is now included in the Southeast Slovenia Statistical Region.

== History ==
Koglo was created as a separate settlement in 1996, when its territory was administratively separated from the villages of Radovlja, Sela pri Zburah, and Žaloviče.

== Church ==
The local church is dedicated to Saint Leonard and belongs to the Parish of Šmarjeta. It is a medieval church that was restyled in the Baroque in the 17th century, but retains a number of its original Gothic features.
