= Gorenja Vas =

Gorenja Vas may refer to several places in Slovenia:

Current settlements

- Gorenja Vas, Gorenja Vas–Poljane, a settlement in the Municipality of Gorenja Vas–Poljane, northwestern Slovenia
- Gorenja Vas, Ivančna Gorica, a settlement in the Municipality of Ivančna Gorica, southeastern Slovenia
- Gorenja Vas, Kanal ob Soči, a settlement in the Municipality of Kanal ob Soči, western Slovenia
- Gorenja Vas, Ribnica, a former settlement in the Municipality of Ribnica, southern Slovenia
- Gorenja Vas, Zagorje ob Savi, a settlement in the Municipality of Zagorje ob Savi, central Slovenia
- Gorenja Vas pri Čatežu, a former settlement in the Municipality of Trebnje, southeastern Slovenia
- Gorenja Vas pri Mirni, a settlement in the Municipality of Mirna, southeastern Slovenia
- Gorenja Vas–Reteče, a settlement in the Municipality of Škofja Loka, northwestern Slovenia
- Municipality of Gorenja Vas–Poljane, a municipality in northwestern Slovenia

Former settlements

- Gorenja Vas pri Leskovcu, a former settlement in the Municipality of Krško, southeastern Slovenia
- Gorenja Vas pri Mokronogu, a former settlement in the Municipality of Mokronog, southeastern Slovenia
- Gorenja Vas pri Polici, a former settlement in the Municipality of Grosuplje, southeastern Slovenia
- Gorenja Vas pri Šmarjeti, a former settlement in the Municipality of Šmarješke Toplice, southeastern Slovenia

In the past, it was also the name of

- Cerknica, the town in southwestern Slovenia, the administrative centre of the Municipality of Cerknica, southwestern Slovenia
- Gorenje, Kočevje, a settlement in the Municipality of Kočevje, southern Slovenia
