= Dragaš =

Dragaš may refer to:

- Dragaš (surname)
- Dejanović noble family, also known as Dragaš noble family (fl. 1355–1395), of the Serbian Empire
- Dragash, also known as Dragaš, a town and municipality in Kosovo

== See also ==
- Dragas, a surname
- Drago (disambiguation)
- Draga (disambiguation)
