= Draga =

Draga may refer to:

== People ==
- Draga (surname)
- Draga (given name)

== Geography ==
In Bosnia:

- Grabova Draga, a village in Široki Brijeg

In Croatia:

- Mošćenička Draga, a village and a municipality in Primorje-Gorski Kotar County
- Barić Draga, a village in Karlobag, Lika-Senj County
- Brcković Draga, a village in Generalski Stol, Karlovac County
- Brestova Draga, a village in Mrkopalj, Primorje-Gorski Kotar County
- Brinjeva Draga, a village in Čabar, Primorje-Gorski Kotar County
- Careva Draga, a village in Krašić, Zagreb County
- Crna Draga, a village in Lasinja, Karlovac County
- Čunkova Draga, a village in Krašić, Zagreb County
- Dolića Draga, a village in Lokvičići, Split-Dalmatia County
- Donja Lamana Draga, a village in Brod Moravice, Primorje-Gorski Kotar County
- Draga (Novigrad Sea), a stream that flows into the Novigrad Sea
- Draga, Požega-Slavonia County, a village near Velika, Croatia
- Draga, Rijeka, an area of the city of Rijeka, Primorje-Gorski Kotar County
- Draga Bašćanska, a village on Krk in Primorje-Gorski Kotar County
- Draga Lukovdolska, a village in Vrbovsko, Primorje-Gorski Kotar County
- Draga Svetojanska, a village in Jastrebarsko, Zagreb County
- Galezova Draga, a village in Ozalj, Karlovac County
- Gornja Lamana Draga, a village in Brod Moravice, Primorje-Gorski Kotar County
- Leskova Draga, a village in Ravna Gora, Primorje-Gorski Kotar County
- Lim valley, a valley that ends in the Lim bay in Istria
- Lovranska Draga, a village in Lovran, Primorje-Gorski Kotar County
- Lukunić Draga, a village in Ozalj, Karlovac County
- Medven Draga, a village in Krašić, Zagreb County
- Medvidovića Draga, a village in Imotski, Split-Dalmatia County
- Prhutova Draga, a village in Čabar, Primorje-Gorski Kotar County
- Puntarska draga, a bay on Krk
- Senjska Draga, a village near Senj
- Srednja Draga, a village in Čabar, Primorje-Gorski Kotar County
- Supetarska Draga, a village on Rab, Primorje-Gorski Kotar County
- Vela Draga or Vranjska Draga, a valley in Istria
- Vodena Draga, a village in Bosiljevo, Karlovac County
- Vrbanska Draga, a village in Ozalj, Karlovac County
- Zrinska Draga, a village in Dvor, Sisak-Moslavina County

In Hungary:

- Draga, another name of Drágszél in Bács-Kiskun County

In Romania:

- Valea Dragă River, Romania
- Draga, a village in Silivașu de Câmpie Commune, Bistriţa-Năsăud County, Romania

In Serbia:

- Draga (Tutin), a village in the Municipality of Sandzak

In Slovenia:

- Draga, Ig, a settlement in the Municipality of Ig
- Draga, Loški Potok, a settlement in the Municipality of Loški Potok
- Draga, Nova Gorica, a settlement in the Municipality of Nova Gorica
- Draga pri Šentrupertu, a settlement in the Municipality of Šentrupert
- Draga pri Sinjem Vrhu, a settlement in the Municipality of Črnomelj
- Draga, Škofja Loka, a settlement in the Municipality of Škofja Loka
- Draga, Šmarješke Toplice, a settlement in the Municipality of Šmarješke Toplice
- Draga, Štore, a settlement in the Municipality of Štore
- Draga (valley), a valley in Begunje na Gorenjskem
- Spodnja Draga, a settlement in the Municipality of Ivančna Gorica
- Volčja Draga, a settlement in the Municipality of Renče–Vogrsko
- Zgornja Draga, a settlement in the Municipality of Ivančna Gorica

== Literature ==
- Draga, rapska pastirica, a poem by Juraj Baraković

== Other ==
- NK Draga, Croatian football team
- Draga (Stargate), a fictional character in Stargate Infinity

== See also ==
- Draaga, fictional character in DC Comics
- Drage (disambiguation)
