= Strmica =

Strmica can refer to:

In Croatia:

- Strmica, Croatia, a village in the Municipality of Knin

In Slovenia:

- Mala Strmica, a settlement in the Municipality of Šmarješke Toplice
- Strmca, Postojna, a settlement in the Municipality of Postojna (known as Strmica until 1994)
- Strmica, Škofja Loka, a settlement in the Municipality of Škofja Loka
- Strmica, Vrhnika, a settlement in the Municipality of Vrhnika
- Velika Strmica, a settlement in the Municipality of Mokronog-Trebelno
