= Brezovica, Šmarješke Toplice =

Brezovica
- Location in Slovenia
- Coordinates: 45°52′41.77″N 15°14′25.36″E
- Country: Slovenia
- Traditional region: Lower Carniola
- Statistical region: Southeast Slovenia
- Municipality: Šmarješke Toplice

Area
  - Total: 3.17 km^{2} (1.22 sq mi)
- Elevation: 183.1 m (601 ft)

Population (2002)
  - Total: 186

Brezovica (pronounced [ˈbɾéːzɔʋitsa]) is a village in the Municipality of Šmarješke Toplice in southeastern Slovenia. It lies between Šmarješke Toplice and Šmarjeta in the historical region of Lower Carniola. The municipality is now included in the Southeast Slovenia Statistical Region.

== Clandestine grave ==
Brezovica is the site of a clandestine grave associated with the Second World War. The Sela Grave (Slovene: Grobišče Sela) is located in the woods northwest of the village. It contains the remains of a Hungarian doctor and partisan that was killed by the Partisans in 1943.
