= Novo Mesto helmet =

Eastern Celtic helmet

The Novo Mesto helmet (also known as "Šmarjeta type" or "Molnik group") refer to an Eastern Celtic type of bowl-shaped helmets, with specimen found at the archaeological sites of Mihovo, Šmarjeta and Novo Mesto in Slovenia, Siemiechów in Poland (spoils, non-native), Boiko-Ponura in Russia.

A specimen of a Late Celtic bowl-shaped bronze helmet found at Šmarjeta-Vinji Vrh archaeological site in Slovenia was buried together with a Noric sword, round shield, horse equipment, and La Tène finds.

== Bibliography ==
- Guštin, Mitja (2020). ""The Amber Route" during the late Iron Age and Roman imperial periods, from the 5th century BC to the 3rd century AD". Revisiting Dispersions: Celtic and Germanic ca 400.
- Hvala, S.T. (2017). Molnik pri Ljubljani v starejši železni dobi. Opera Instituti Archaeologici Sloveniae (in Slovenian). Založba ZRC. ISBN 978-961-05-0020-9.
- Hvala, Sneža Tecco (2012-01-01). Magdalenska gora: družbena struktura in grobni rituali železnodobne skupnosti (in Slovenian). Založba ZRC. ISBN 978-961-254-400-3.
- Kmecl, Matjaž (1987). Treasure Chest of Slovenia. Cankarjeva založba. ISBN 978-86-361-0549-8.
- Olmsted, Garrett S. (2001). Celtic Art in Transition During the First Century BC: An Examination of the Creations of Mint Masters and Metal Smiths, and an Analysis of Stylistic Development During the Phase Between La Tène and Provincial Roman. Inst. für Sprachen u. Literatur. ISBN 978-3-85124-203-4.
- Woźniak, Zenon; Grygiel, Michał; Machajewski, Henryk; Michałowski, Andrzej (2013). The Jastorf Culture in Poland. Archaeopress. ISBN 978-1-4073-1202-6.
- "Vjesnik Arheološkog muzeja u Zagrebu". Vjesnik Arheološkog muzeja u Zagrebu (in Croatian). 40. 2007.
