= Zbure =

- Location in Slovenia
- Coordinates: 45°54′28.6″N 15°14′53.2″E
- Country: Slovenia
- Traditional region: Lower Carniola
- Statistical region: Southeast Slovenia
- Municipality: Šmarješke Toplice

Area
  - Total: 2.62 km^{2} (1.01 sq mi)
- Elevation: 179.7 m (590 ft)

Population (2002)
  - Total: 155

Zbure (pronounced [ˈzbuːɾɛ]; German: Swur) is a village in the Municipality of Šmarješke Toplice in southeastern Slovenia. It lies north of Šmarjeta at the intersection of roads leading west to Mokronog and east to Škocjan. The area is part of the historical region of Lower Carniola. The municipality is now included in the Southeast Slovenia Statistical Region.
