= Sela, Šmarješke Toplice =

Sela
- Location in Slovenia
- Coordinates: 45°52′8.22″N 15°15′49.15″E
- Country: Slovenia
- Traditional region: Lower Carniola
- Statistical region: Southeast Slovenia
- Municipality: Šmarješke Toplice

Area
  - Total: 0.27 km^{2} (0.10 sq mi)
- Elevation: 201 m (659 ft)

Population (2002)
  - Total: 26

Sela (pronounced [ˈseːla]) is a small settlement west of Bela Cerkev in the Municipality of Šmarješke Toplice in southeastern Slovenia. The area is part of the historical region of Lower Carniola. The municipality is now included in the Southeast Slovenia Statistical Region.
