= Hrib, Šmarješke Toplice =

Hrib
- Location in Slovenia
- Coordinates: 45°52′19.98″N 15°17′20.55″E
- Country: Slovenia
- Traditional region: Lower Carniola
- Statistical region: Southeast Slovenia
- Municipality: Šmarješke Toplice

Area
  - Total: 0.13 km^{2} (0.050 sq mi)
- Elevation: 212.1 m (696 ft)

Population (2002)
  - Total: 31

Hrib (pronounced [ˈxɾiːp]) is a small settlement in the Municipality of Šmarješke Toplice in southeastern Slovenia. It lies on the left bank of the Krka River east of Bela Cerkev in the historical region of Lower Carniola. The municipality is now included in the Southeast Slovenia Statistical Region.
