= Čelevec =

Čelevec may refer to:

- Čelevec, North Macedonia, in the municipality of Demir Kapija
- Čelevec, Šmarješke Toplice, Slovenia
