= Vinica pri Šmarjeti =

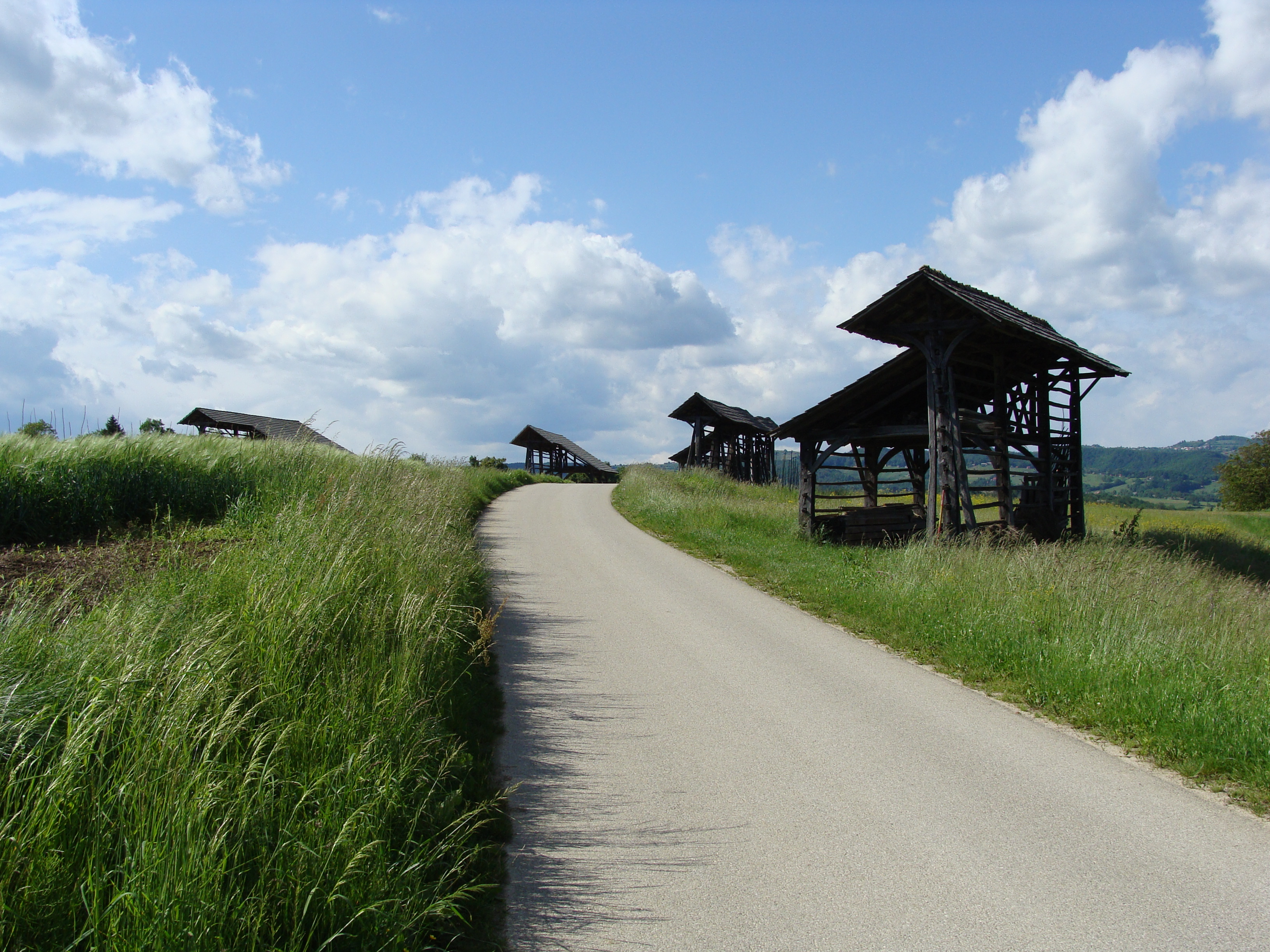

- Location in Slovenia
- Coordinates: 45°53′45.71″N 15°15′51″E
- Country: Slovenia
- Traditional region: Lower Carniola
- Statistical region: Southeast Slovenia
- Municipality: Šmarješke Toplice

Area
  - Total: 1.75 km^{2} (0.68 sq mi)
- Elevation: 228.2 m (749 ft)

Population (2002)
  - Total: 135

Vinica pri Šmarjeti (pronounced [ˈʋiːnitsa pɾi ʃmaˈɾjeːti]) is a village in the Municipality of Šmarješke Toplice in southeastern Slovenia. It lies northeast of Šmarjeta. The area is part of the historical region of Lower Carniola. The municipality is now included in the Southeast Slovenia Statistical Region.

== Name ==
The name of the settlement was changed from Vinica to Vinica pri Šmarjeti in 1955.

== Church ==
The local church is dedicated to Saint Martin and belongs to the Parish of Šmarjeta. It is a medieval church that was restyled in the Baroque in 1742.
