= Dol pri Šmarjeti =

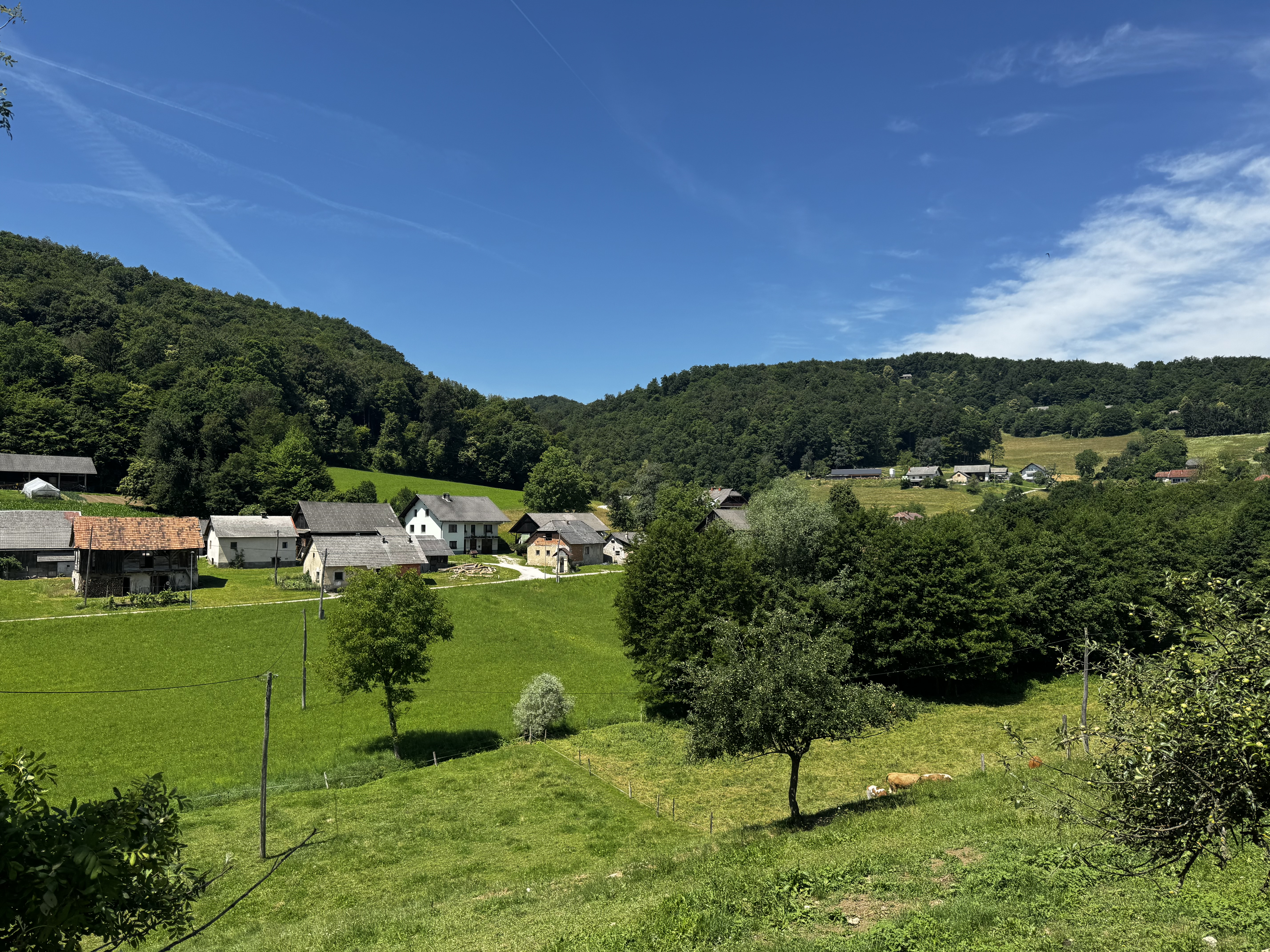

- Location in Slovenia
- Coordinates: 45°54′57.61″N 15°13′29.33″E
- Country: Slovenia
- Traditional region: Lower Carniola
- Statistical region: Southeast Slovenia
- Municipality: Šmarješke Toplice

Area
  - Total: 0.67 km^{2} (0.26 sq mi)
- Elevation: 208.3 m (683 ft)

Population (2002)
  - Total: 37

Dol pri Šmarjeti (pronounced [ˈdoːl pɾi ʃmaˈɾjeːti]) is a small settlement in the historical region of Lower Carniola in southeastern Slovenia. It lies in the Municipality of Šmarješke Toplice, which is included in the Southeast Slovenia Statistical Region.

== Name ==
The name of the settlement was changed from Dol to Dol pri Šmarjeti in 1953.

== Clandestine grave ==
Dol pri Šmarjeti is the site of a clandestine grave from the Second World War. The Dol pri Šmarjeti Grave (Slovene: Grobišče Dol pri Šmarjeti) is located on a hilly slope in a woods 100 m east of the road from Šmarjeta to Mokronog, north of the hamlet of Preloge. It contains the remains of 13-year-old boy that was shot by the Partisans in 1942 for allegedly spying for German forces.
