= David Per =

Slovenian cyclist

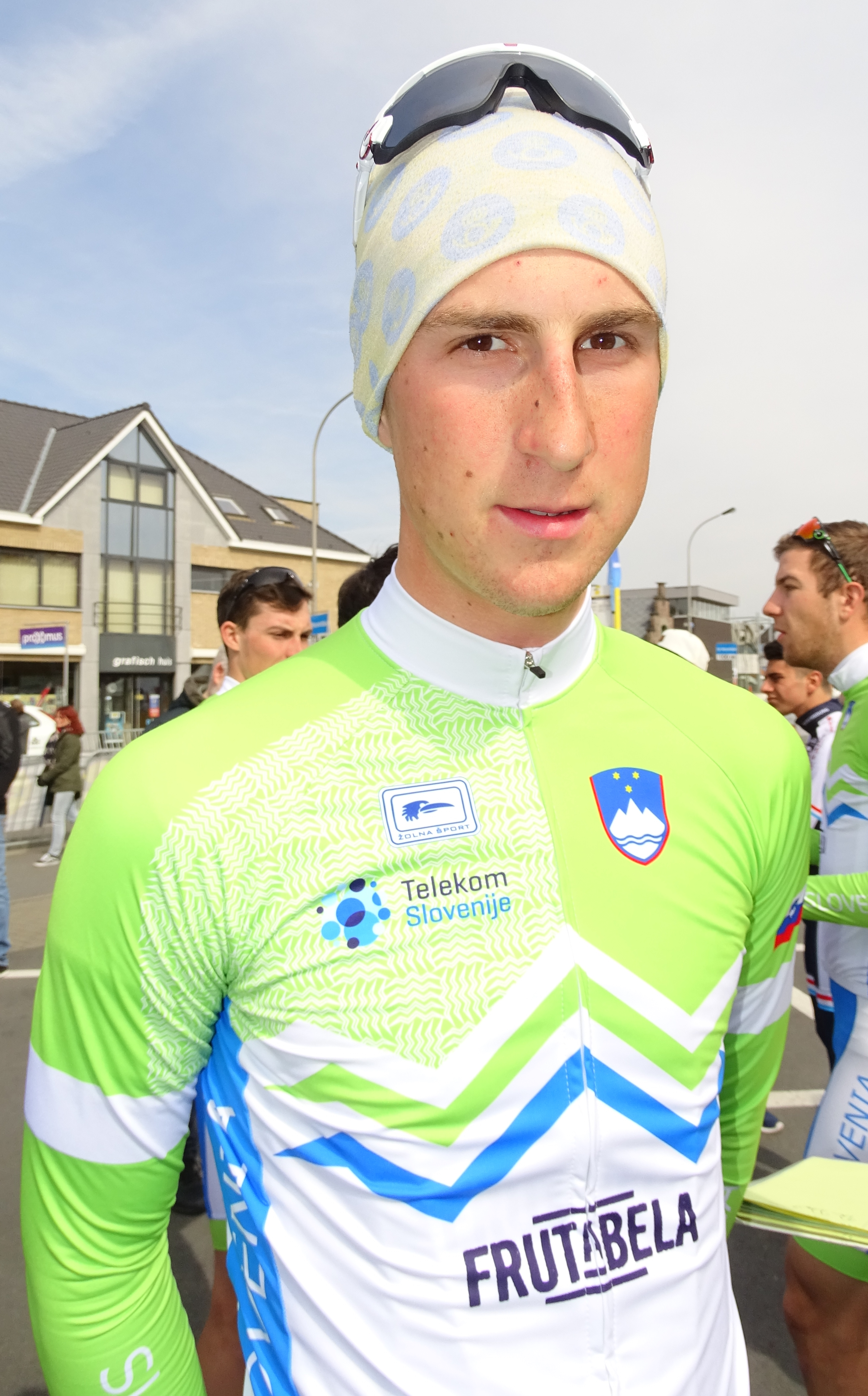
- Per in 2016

Personal information
- Full name: David Per
- Born: 13 February 1995 (age 31) Dolenje Kronovo, Slovenia
- Height: 1.92 m (6 ft 4 in)
- Weight: 81 kg (179 lb)

Cycling career
- Sport: Cycling
- Discipline: Road
- Role: Rider

Professional teams
- 2014–2016: Adria Mobil
- 2017–2018: Bahrain–Merida
- 2019–2022: Adria Mobil

David Per (born 13 February 1995 in Dolenje Kronovo) is a Slovenian cyclist, who last rode for UCI Continental team Kolesarski Klub Novo Mesto.

== Major results ==
2012
National Junior Road Championships

1st Time trial
2nd Road race

2013
National Junior Road Championships

1st Time trial
3rd Road race

1st Overall Oberösterreich Juniorenrundfahrt

1st Stage 2

2nd Overall Tour of Istria

1st Stage 1

6th Overall Trofeo Karlsberg
9th Trofeo Guido Dorigo
2014
1st Time trial, National Under-23 Road Championships
5th Overall Tour of Al Zubarah

1st Young rider classification

2015
1st Time trial, National Under-23 Road Championships
2016
1st Ronde van Vlaanderen Beloften
2nd GP Laguna
National Road Championships

3rd Time trial
3rd Road race

4th Kattekoers
4th GP Adria Mobil
2018
6th Time trial, National Road Championships
2019
4th GP Adria Mobil
2021
4th GP Slovenia
4th GP Czech Republic
5th GP Adria Mobil
7th GP Kranj
2022
9th GP Adria Mobil
