= Gorenja Vas pri Šmarjeti =

- Location in Slovenia
- Coordinates: 45°53′14.49″N 15°14′24.11″E
- Country: Slovenia
- Traditional region: Lower Carniola
- Statistical region: Southeast Slovenia
- Municipality: Šmarješke Toplice

Area
  - Total: 1.34 km^{2} (0.52 sq mi)
- Elevation: 204.9 m (672 ft)

Population (2002)
  - Total: 197

Gorenja Vas pri Šmarjeti (pronounced [ɡɔˈɾeːnja ˈʋaːs pɾi ʃmaˈɾjeːti]; Slovene: Gorenja vas pri Šmarjeti, German: Oberdorf) is a village immediately west of Šmarjeta in the Municipality of Šmarješke Toplice in southeastern Slovenia. The area is part of the historical region of Lower Carniola. The municipality is now included in the Southeast Slovenia Statistical Region. The settlement includes the hamlets of Mevce to the northwest, Podkrajec to the north, and Dolina, Hrib, and Ravnik to the west.

== Name ==
The name of the settlement was changed from Gorenja vas (literally 'upper village') to Gorenja vas pri Šmarjeti (literally, 'upper village near Šmarjeta') in 1953. In the past the German name was Oberdorf.

== History ==
A manor farm belonging to Šuta Castle in Šmarjeta once stood in the village. It was subdivided and sold off by Ignac Bogataj in 1857. During the Second World War, the Partisans had an encampment in the hills west of the village.
