= Vinji Vrh, Šmarješke Toplice =

Vinji Vrh
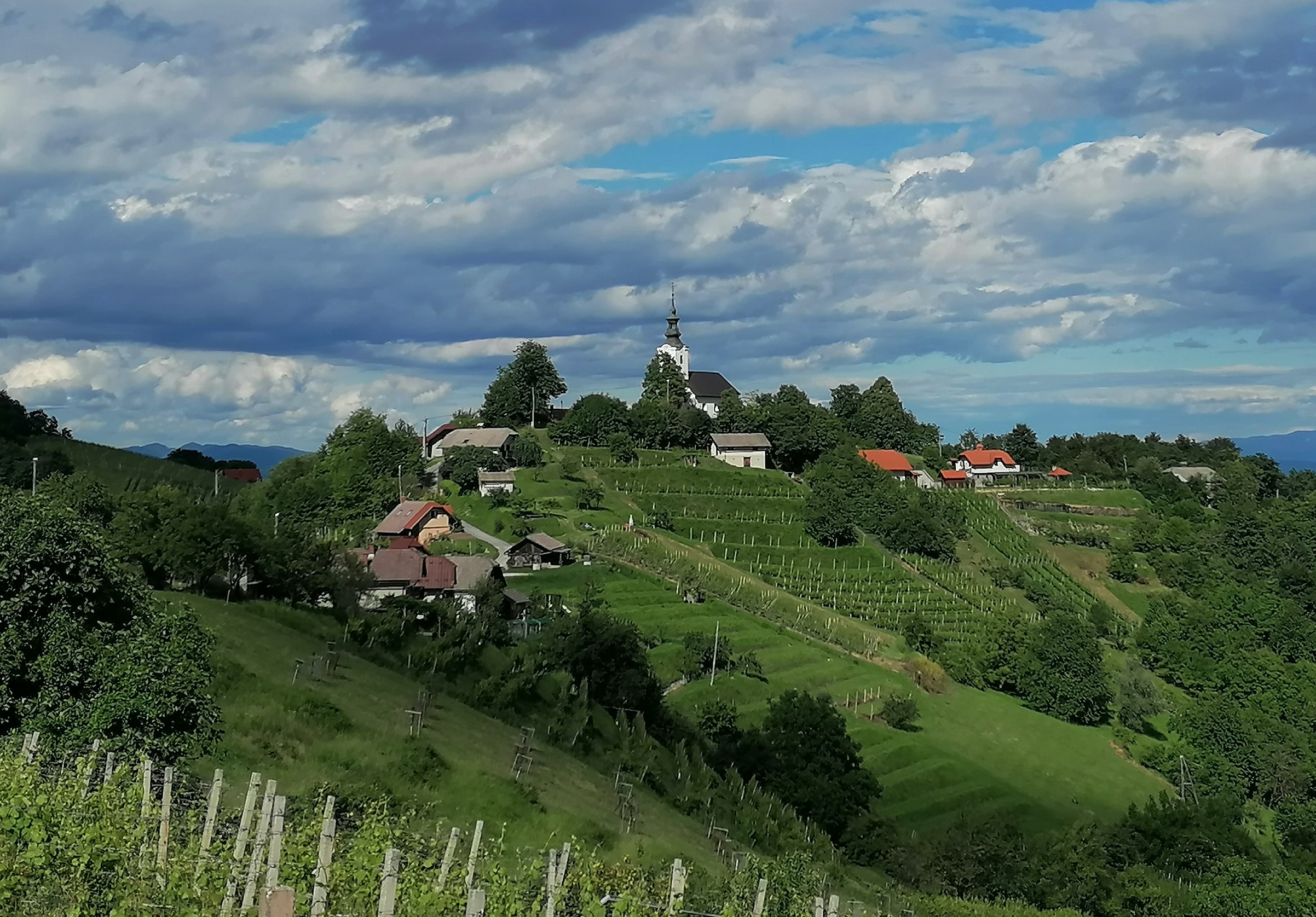

- Location in Slovenia
- Coordinates: 45°52′38.13″N 15°17′18.33″E
- Country: Slovenia
- Traditional region: Lower Carniola
- Statistical region: Southeast Slovenia
- Municipality: Šmarješke Toplice

Area
  - Total: 2.22 km^{2} (0.86 sq mi)
- Elevation: 232.6 m (763 ft)

Population (2002)
  - Total: 161

Vinji Vrh (pronounced [ˈʋiːnji ˈʋəɾx]) is a settlement in the Municipality of Šmarješke Toplice in southeastern Slovenia. The area is part of the historical region of Lower Carniola. The municipality is now included in the Southeast Slovenia Statistical Region.

The local church is dedicated to John the Baptist and belongs to the Parish of Bela Cerkev. It dates to the 17th century.
