= Dragaš (surname) =

Dragaš is a surname associated with the Dragaš noble family.

- Aleksandar Dragaš, Croatian rock critic and journalist
- Jovan Dragaš (1343–1378), nobleman
- Helena Dragaš (Serbian Latin: Jelena Dragaš), Empress consort of the Byzantine Empire, married to Manuel II Palaiologos
- Konstantin Dejanović Dragaš (d. 1395), nobleman
- Konstantin Paleolog Dragaš or Constantine XI Palaiologos, the last Byzantine Emperor
- Miloš Dragaš (born 1990), Serbian handball player
- Mirjana Dragaš (born 1950), Serbian politician
- Nikola Dragaš (b. 1944), Croatian 9-pin-bowler
- Špela Dragaš, Slovenian-Italian rhythmic gymnastics coach
- Žarko Dragaš, Montenegrin footballer

== See also ==
- Dragaš (disambiguation)
- Drago (disambiguation)
- Draga (disambiguation)
