= Blatnik pri Črmošnjicah =

- Location in Slovenia
- Coordinates: 45°38′45.03″N 15°8′9.04″E
- Country: Slovenia
- Traditional region: Lower Carniola
- Statistical region: Southeast Slovenia
- Municipality: Semič

Area
  - Total: 3.65 km^{2} (1.41 sq mi)
- Elevation: 502 m (1,647 ft)

Population (2002)
  - Total: 11

Blatnik pri Črmošnjicah (pronounced [ˈbláːtnik pɾi tʃəɾmɔˈʃnjìːtsax, -njíː-]; German: Rußbach) is a small settlement in the Municipality of Semič in Slovenia. It was inhabited by Gottschee Germans that were mostly expelled in 1941 during the Second World War. The area is part of the historical region of Lower Carniola. The municipality is now included in the Southeast Slovenia Statistical Region.

== Name ==
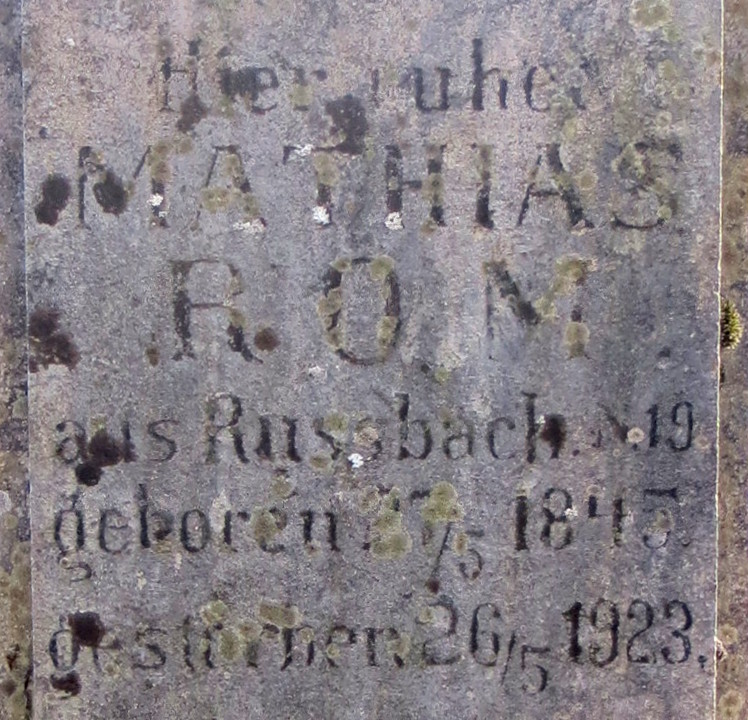
Gottschee German gravestone with the toponym Russbach

Blatnik pri Črmošnjicah was attested in written sources as Ruespach in 1574. The toponym Blatnik is relatively common in Slovenia and generally refers to low-lying areas near water; it is also found as a hydronym and surname. The name is derived from the common noun blato 'mud; swamp, marsh', which is also the root of names like Blače, Blatno, and Blate. In this case, the settlement lies in an area with several karst springs feeding Blatnik Creek (Blatniški potok), a tributary of Vrčica Creek. In the past, Blatnik pri Črmošnjicah was known as Rußbach in German. The name Rußbach is a compound of Ruß 'soot(y), black' and bach 'creek', referring to the former name of Blatnik Creek (cf. also medieval Růzpach, now Sajevec).

== Church ==
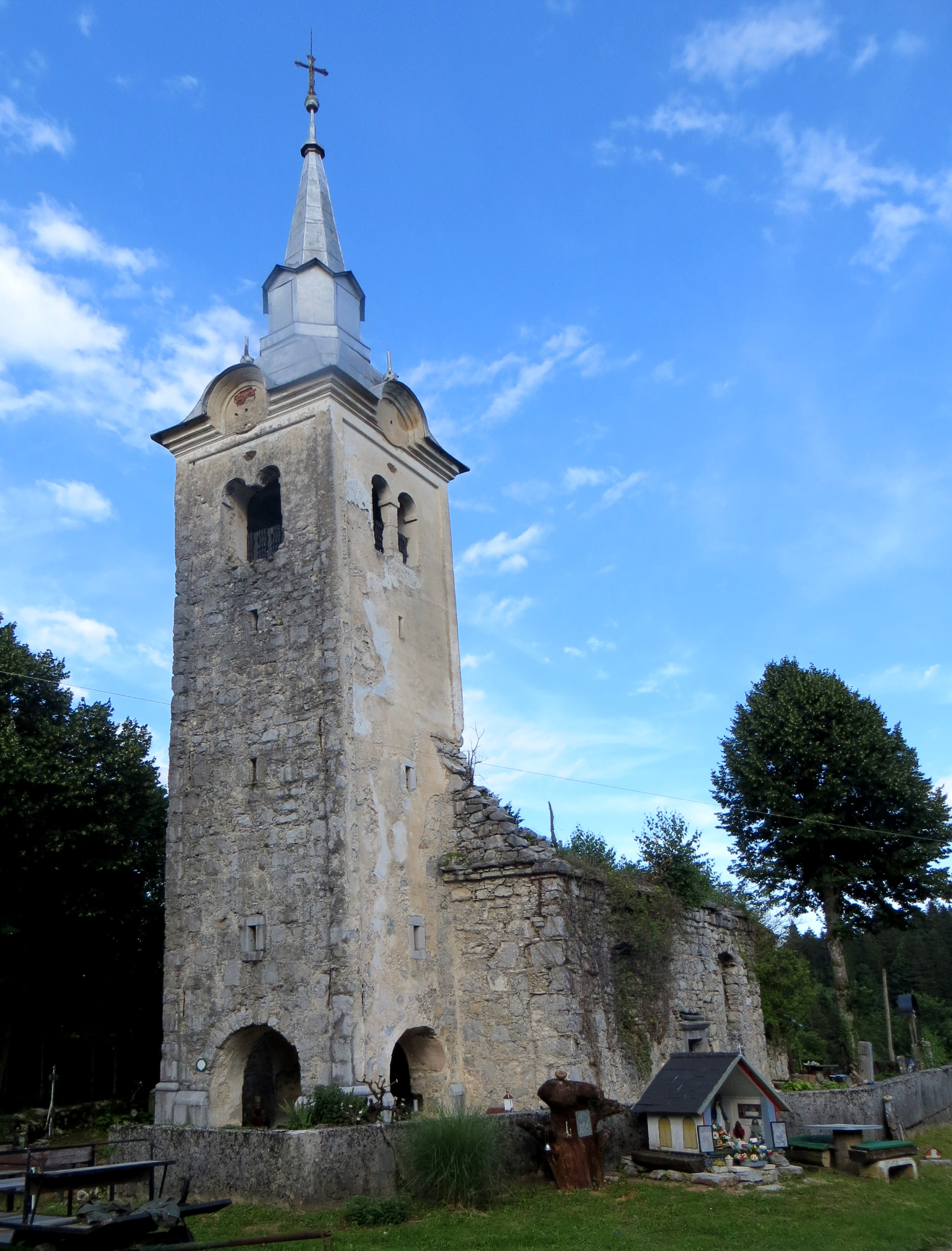
View from west

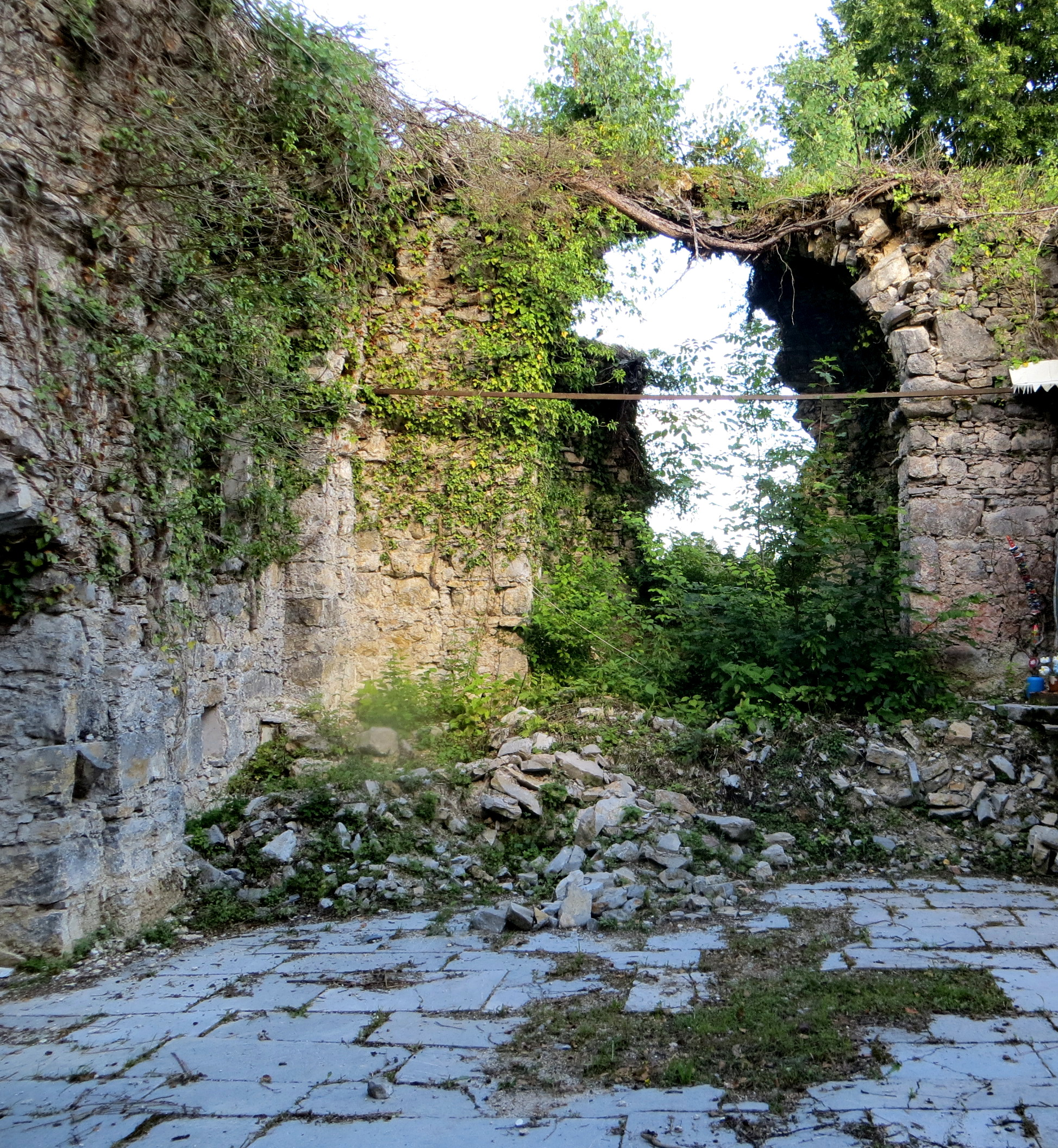
Interior

Holy Cross Church

The local church is now only a ruin. It was dedicated to the Holy Cross and was a Baroque building from the mid-17th century.
