= Radovlja =

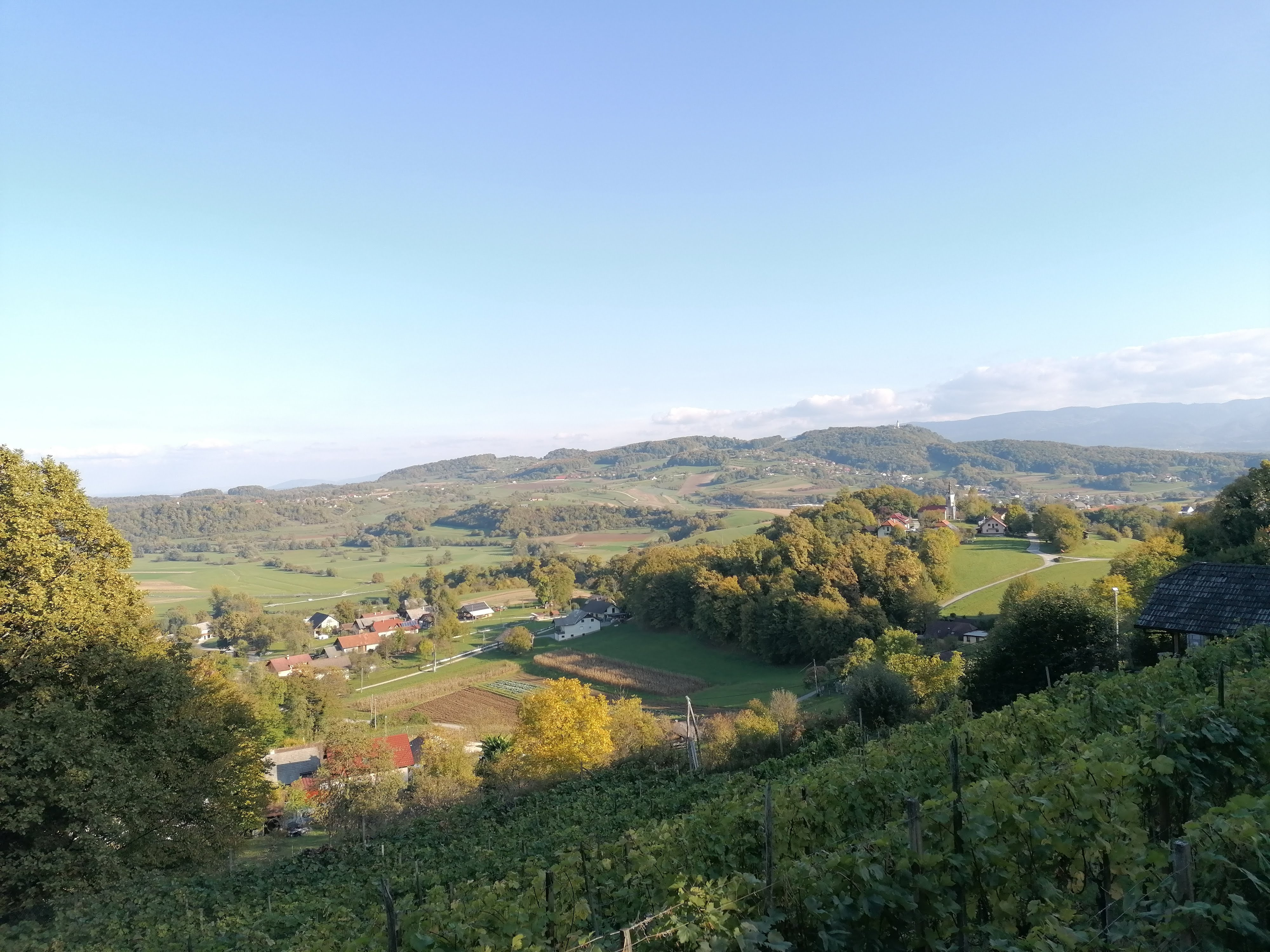

- Location in Slovenia
- Coordinates: 45°53′40.75″N 15°14′11.7″E
- Country: Slovenia
- Traditional region: Lower Carniola
- Statistical region: Southeast Slovenia
- Municipality: Šmarješke Toplice

Area
  - Total: 1.26 km^{2} (0.49 sq mi)
- Elevation: 239.9 m (787 ft)

Population (2002)
  - Total: 152

Radovlja (pronounced [ˈɾaːdɔu̯lja]) is a settlement northwest of Šmarjeta in the Municipality of Šmarješke Toplice in southeastern Slovenia. The area is part of the historical region of Lower Carniola and is now included in the Southeast Slovenia Statistical Region.

== Church ==
Saint James's Church

The church in Radovlja is dedicated to Saint James.
