= Dragas =

Dragas is a surname. Notable people with the surname include:

- George Dragas (born 1944), Greek-born Orthodox Christian priest in America
- Helen Dragas, American business executive
- Tara Dragas (born 2007), Italian rhythmic gymnast

== See also ==
- Dragaš (surname)
