= Draga, Šmarješke Toplice =

Draga
- Location in Slovenia
- Coordinates: 45°52′15.5″N 15°16′58.74″E
- Country: Slovenia
- Traditional region: Lower Carniola
- Statistical region: Southeast Slovenia
- Municipality: Šmarješke Toplice

Area
  - Total: 0.24 km^{2} (0.093 sq mi)
- Elevation: 165.8 m (544 ft)

Population (2002)
  - Total: 14

Draga (pronounced [ˈdɾaːɡa]) is a small settlement in the Municipality of Šmarješke Toplice in southeastern Slovenia. It lies on the left bank of the Krka River east of Bela Cerkev. The area is part of the historical region of Lower Carniola. The municipality is now included in the Southeast Slovenia Statistical Region.

== Name ==
The name Draga is derived from the Slovene common noun draga 'small, narrow valley', which refers to the geographical location of the settlement.

== Church ==
The local church is dedicated to Saint Helena and belongs to the Parish of Bela Cerkev. It was first mentioned in written documents dating to 1531. It was renovated in the Baroque style in the 18th century.
