= Gradenje =

- Location in Slovenia
- Coordinates: 45°52′22.48″N 15°15′46.43″E
- Country: Slovenia
- Traditional region: Lower Carniola
- Statistical region: Southeast Slovenia
- Municipality: Šmarješke Toplice

Area
  - Total: 0.31 km^{2} (0.12 sq mi)
- Elevation: 221.3 m (726 ft)

Population (2002)
  - Total: 28

Gradenje (pronounced [ɡɾaˈdeːnjɛ]) is a small settlement in the Municipality of Šmarješke Toplice in southeastern Slovenia. The municipality is included in the Southeast Slovenia Statistical Region and was part of the historical region of Lower Carniola.
