= Mala Strmica =

- Location in Slovenia
- Coordinates: 45°54′28.49″N 15°13′8.8″E
- Country: Slovenia
- Traditional region: Lower Carniola
- Statistical region: Southeast Slovenia
- Municipality: Šmarješke Toplice

Area
  - Total: 0.93 km^{2} (0.36 sq mi)
- Elevation: 369.1 m (1,211 ft)

Population (2002)
  - Total: 26

Mala Strmica (pronounced [ˈmaːla ˈstəɾmitsa]) is a settlement in the Municipality of Šmarješke Toplice in southeastern Slovenia. It lies in the hills northwest of Šmarjeta in the historical region of Lower Carniola. The municipality is now included in the Southeast Slovenia Statistical Region.
