= Dolenje Kronovo =

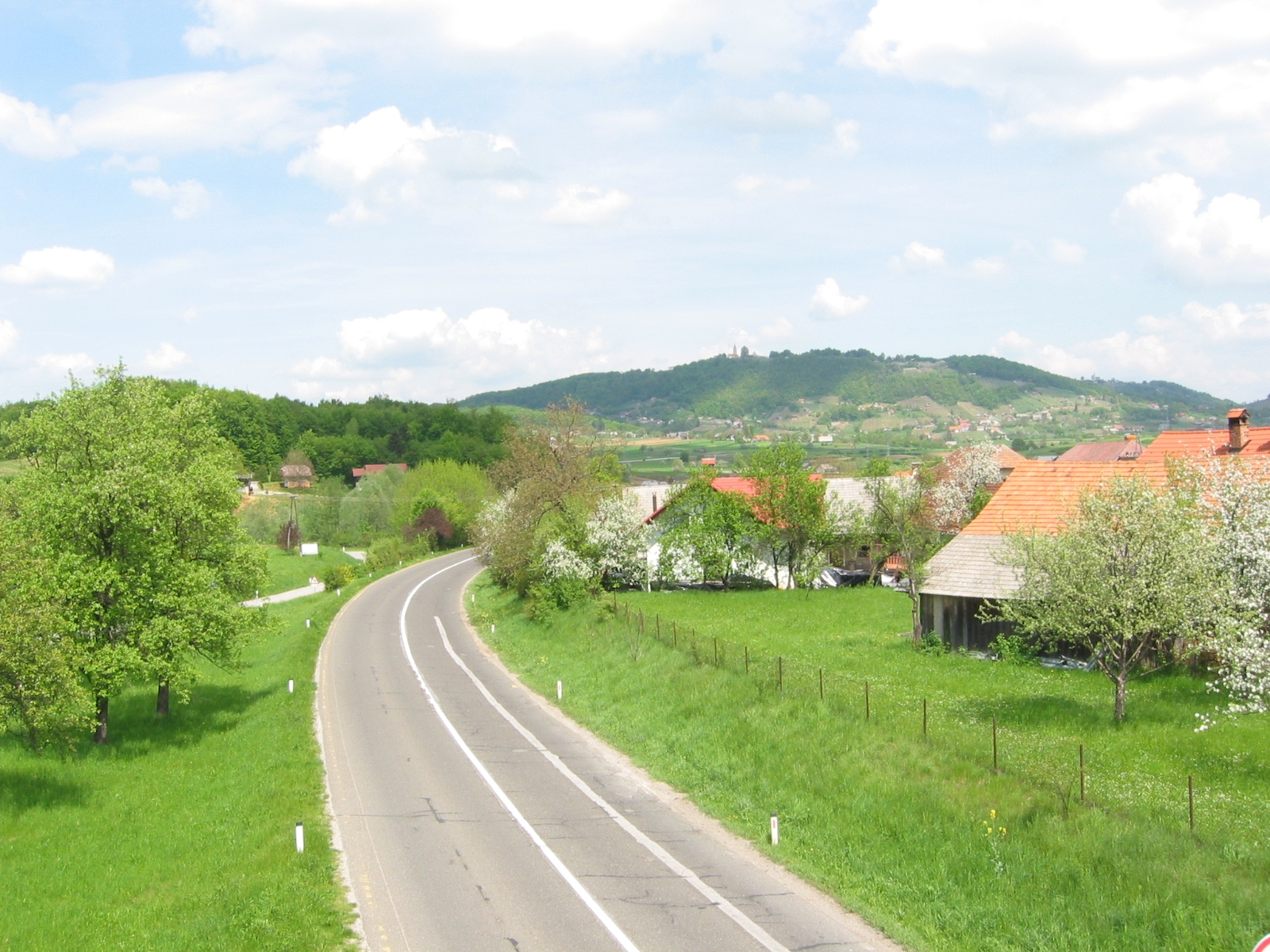

- Location in Slovenia
- Coordinates: 45°51′16.12″N 15°15′24.79″E
- Country: Slovenia
- Traditional region: Lower Carniola
- Statistical region: Southeast Slovenia
- Municipality: Šmarješke Toplice

Area
  - Total: 1.87 km^{2} (0.72 sq mi)
- Elevation: 158.1 m (519 ft)

Population (2002)
  - Total: 135

Dolenje Kronovo (pronounced [dɔˈleːnjɛ ˈkɾoːnɔʋɔ]) is a village in the Municipality of Šmarješke Toplice in southeastern Slovenia. The area is part of the historical region of Lower Carniola. The municipality is now included in the Southeast Slovenia Statistical Region.

The local church is dedicated to Saint Nicholas and belongs to the Parish of Bela Cerkev. It is a medieval church that was restyled in the Baroque in 1739.
