= Žaloviče =

- Location in Slovenia
- Coordinates: 45°52′35.16″N 15°12′49.8″E
- Country: Slovenia
- Traditional region: Lower Carniola
- Statistical region: Southeast Slovenia
- Municipality: Šmarješke Toplice

Area
  - Total: 2.64 km^{2} (1.02 sq mi)
- Elevation: 370.5 m (1,216 ft)

Population (2002)
  - Total: 93

Žaloviče (pronounced [ˈʒaːlɔʋitʃɛ]) is a village in the Municipality of Šmarješke Toplice in southeastern Slovenia. The area is part of the historical region of Lower Carniola. The municipality is now included in the Southeast Slovenia Statistical Region.

The local parish church is dedicated to Saint Ulrich (Slovene: sveti Urh) and belongs to the Parish of Šmarjeta. It was built in 1807.
