= Gorenja Vas, Ribnica =

Gorenja Vas
- Location in Slovenia
- Coordinates: 45°44′34.39″N 14°43′26.08″E
- Country: Slovenia
- Traditional region: Lower Carniola
- Statistical region: Southeast Slovenia
- Municipality: Ribnica
- Elevation: 494 m (1,621 ft)

Gorenja Vas (pronounced [ɡɔˈɾeːnja ˈʋaːs]; Slovene: Gorenja vas, sometimes Gorenja vas pri Ribnici; German: Oberdorf) is a formerly independent settlement in the Municipality of Ribnica in southern Slovenia. It is now part of the town of Ribnica. The area is part of the traditional region of Lower Carniola and is now included in the Southeast Slovenia Statistical Region. The settlement included the hamlet of Lepovče to the east, on the other side of the railroad tracks.

== Name ==
The name Gorenja vas literally means 'upper village'. Gorenja vas and names like it are common in Slovenia and other Slavic countries, and they indicate that the settlement lay at a higher elevation than nearby settlements. In the past it was known as Oberdorf in German.

== History ==
There were formerly two grain mills and a sawmill along the Bistrica River in the village, but these have been abandoned. Water mains were installed in Gorenja Vas in 1940, connected to the spring below St. Francis' church in neighboring Sajevec. Gorenja Vas was annexed by the town of Ribnica in 1968, ending its existence as an independent settlement.

== Church ==
A church in the village's former territory is dedicated to Saint Anne and stands to the northeast, in the Little Mountains (Slovene: Mala gora) chain. It belongs to the Parish of Ribnica and is now part of the territory of Zapuže pri Ribnici. It was first mentioned in written documents dating to 1576, but was rebuilt in 1623 and in the 19th century. Its main altar dates to 1889. The church is built on the site of a prehistoric structure. In the Middle Ages, the church was fortified to serve as a refuge during Ottoman attacks.

== Notable people ==
Notable people that were born or lived in Gorenja Vas include:

- Matija Maležič (1916–1995), politician
- Janez Pucelj (a.k.a. Ivan Pucelj) (1890–1964), poet and translator
