= Municipality of Šmarješke Toplice =

Municipality of Slovenia

Municipality of Šmarješke Toplice Občina Šmarješke Toplice
- Municipality
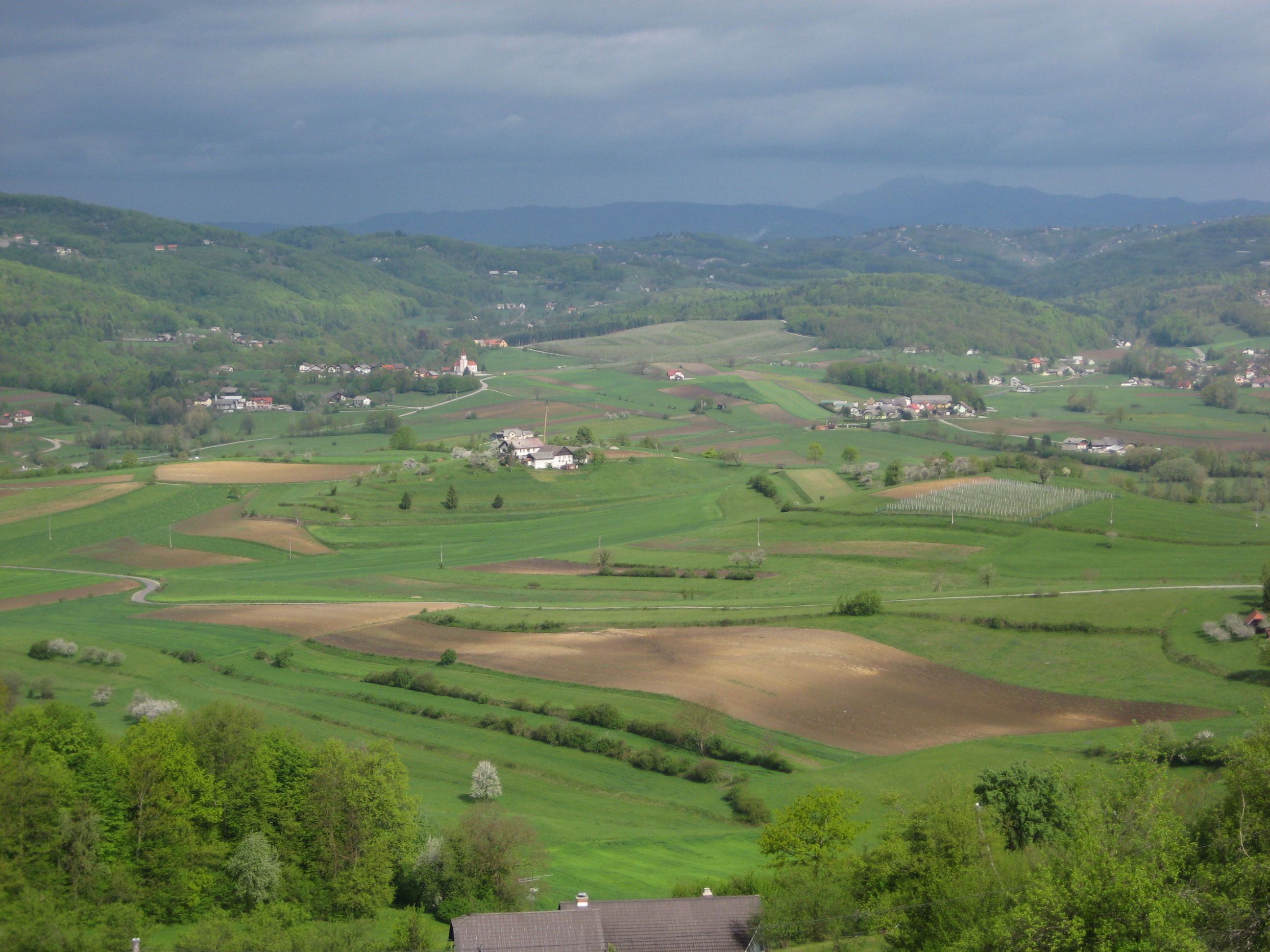

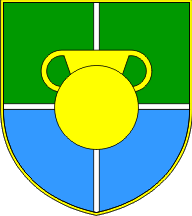
- Coat of arms

- Location of the Municipality of Šmarješke Toplice in Slovenia
- Coordinates: 45°51′44″N 15°13′17″E
- Country: Slovenia

Government
  - Mayor: Bernardka Krnc
- Time zone: UTC+01 (CET)
  - Summer (DST): UTC+02 (CEST)
- Website: www.smarjeske-toplice.si

The Municipality of Šmarješke Toplice (pronounced [ʃmaˈɾjeːʃkɛ tɔˈpliːtsɛ]) is a municipality in the traditional region of Lower Carniola in southeastern Slovenia. The seat of the municipality is the town of Šmarješke Toplice. The municipality is now included in the Southeast Slovenia Statistical Region.

== Settlements ==
In addition to the municipal seat of Šmarješke Toplice, the municipality also includes the following settlements:

- Bela Cerkev
- Brezovica
- Čelevec
- Dol pri Šmarjeti
- Dolenje Kronovo
- Draga
- Družinska Vas
- Gorenja Vas pri Šmarjeti
- Gradenje
- Grič pri Klevevžu
- Hrib
- Koglo
- Mala Strmica
- Orešje
- Radovlja
- Sela
- Sela pri Zburah
- Šmarjeta
- Strelac
- Vinica pri Šmarjeti
- Vinji Vrh
- Zbure
- Žaloviče
