= Drage =

Drage may refer to:

- Drage, Metlika, a village in Slovenia
- Drage, Nordfriesland, a village in Schleswig-Holstein, Germany
- Drage, Steinburg, a village in Schleswig-Holstein, Germany
- Drage, Lower Saxony, a village in Lower Saxony, Germany
- the German name for the river Drawa in Poland
- Drage, Zadar County, a village near Pakoštane, Croatia
- Drage, Karlovac County, a village near Rakovica, Croatia
- Velike Drage, a village near Brod Moravice, Croatia

== See also ==
- Draga (disambiguation)
