= Grič pri Klevevžu =

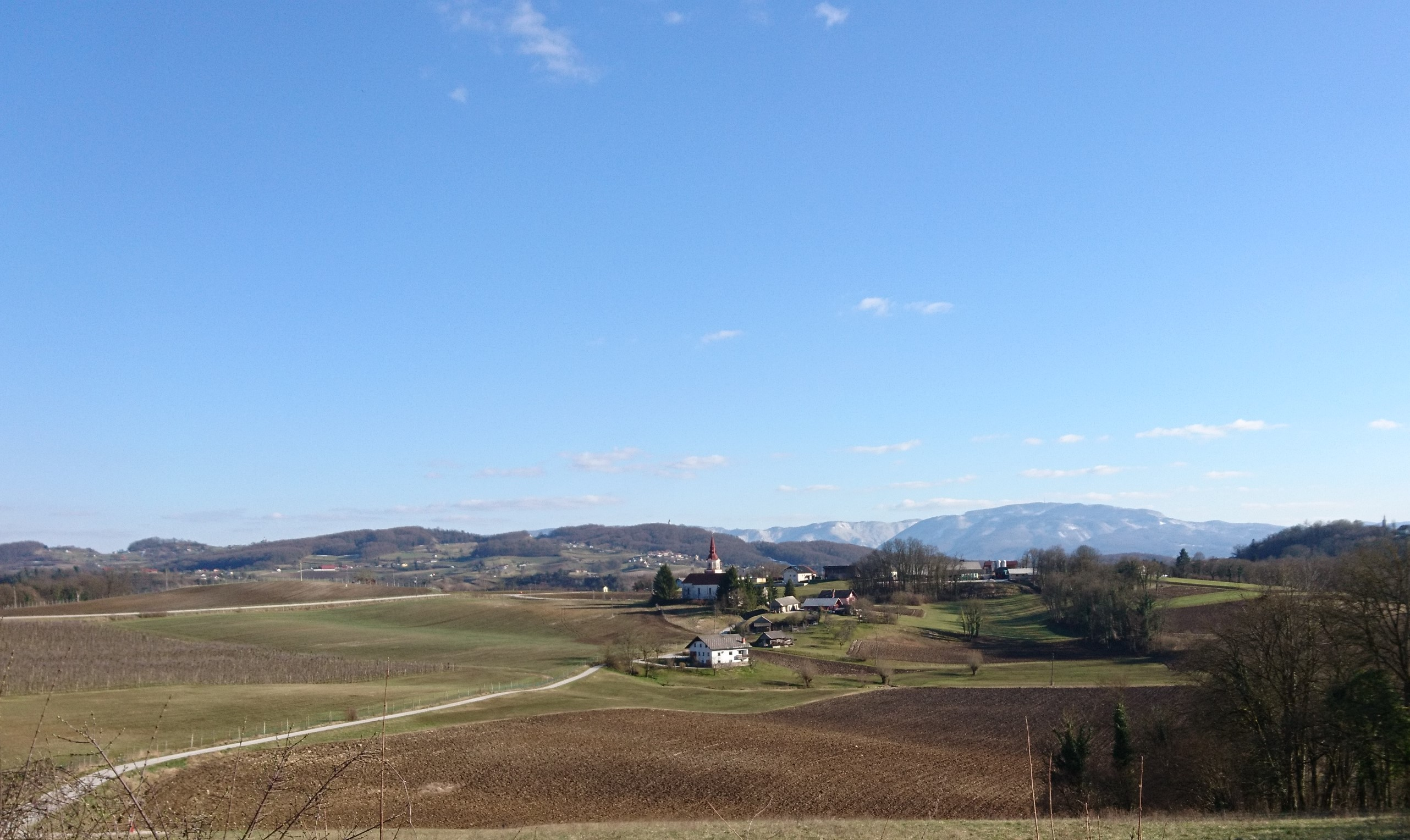

- Location in Slovenia
- Coordinates: 45°54′19.02″N 15°13′50.99″E
- Country: Slovenia
- Traditional region: Lower Carniola
- Statistical region: Southeast Slovenia
- Municipality: Šmarješke Toplice

Area
  - Total: 1.46 km^{2} (0.56 sq mi)
- Elevation: 226.8 m (744 ft)

Population (2002)
  - Total: 44

Grič pri Klevevžu (pronounced [ˈɡɾiːtʃ pɾi klɛˈʋeːu̯ʒu]) is a settlement in the Municipality of Šmarješke Toplice in southeastern Slovenia. The area is part of the historical region of Lower Carniola. The municipality is now included in the Southeast Slovenia Statistical Region.

== Name ==
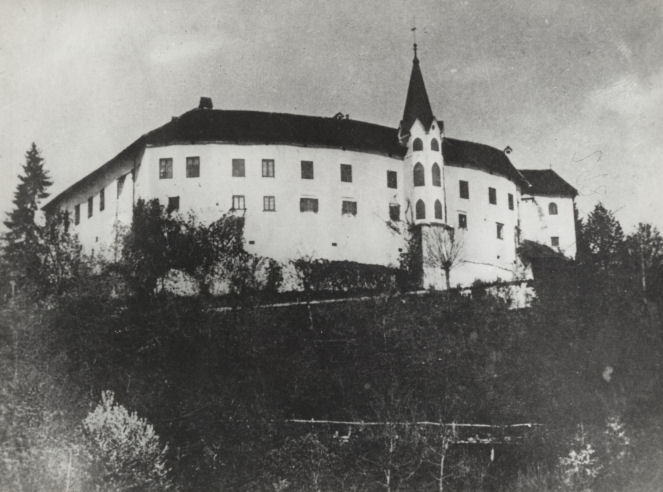
Klevevž Castle, about 1941

The name Grič pri Klevevžu literally means 'hillock near Klevevž'. The name refers to medieval Klevevž Castle (German: Klingenfels), first mentioned in written documents dating to 1267. It was burned down by the Yugoslav Partisans during World War II.

== Mass graves ==
Grič pri Klevevžu is the site of three known mass graves associated with the Second World War. The Klevevž 1–3 mass graves (Slovene: Grobišče Klevevž 1–3) are located north of the settlement. They are also known as the Kačja Rid, Bričevka, or Jurjevci mass graves. They contain the remains of Slovene and Romani civilians murdered by the Partisans in the spring and early summer of 1942 while the staff of the Krka Detachment was at Klevevž Castle. The first grave is located in the woods 30 meters (98 ft) from the main road and 10 meters (33 ft) from a forest path; it contains the remains of 30 victims. The second grave lies in front of a sinkhole next to a path in the woods, about 180 meters (590 ft) from the main road, and contains the remains of several dozen victims. The third grave lies in front of another sinkhole next to the same path in the woods, about 220 meters (720 ft) from the main road, and contains the remains of several dozen victims.
