= Družinska Vas =

- Location in Slovenia
- Coordinates: 45°51′38.47″N 15°15′25.82″E
- Country: Slovenia
- Traditional region: Lower Carniola
- Statistical region: Southeast Slovenia
- Municipality: Šmarješke Toplice

Area
  - Total: 1.59 km^{2} (0.61 sq mi)
- Elevation: 164.3 m (539 ft)

Population (2002)
  - Total: 295

Družinska Vas (pronounced [dɾuˈʒiːnska ˈʋaːs]; Slovene: Družinska vas, German: Gesindeldorf) is a village on the left bank of the Krka River in the Municipality of Šmarješke Toplice in southeastern Slovenia. The area is part of the historical region of Lower Carniola. The municipality is now included in the Southeast Slovenia Statistical Region.

== Name ==
Družinska Vas was attested in historical sources as Droschendorf in 1386 and Drosindorf in 1483. The name is derived from the nickname *Druganъ, presumably referring to an early inhabitant of the village, and therefore means 'Druganъ's village'.
