= Draga (Tutin) =

- Village (Selo)
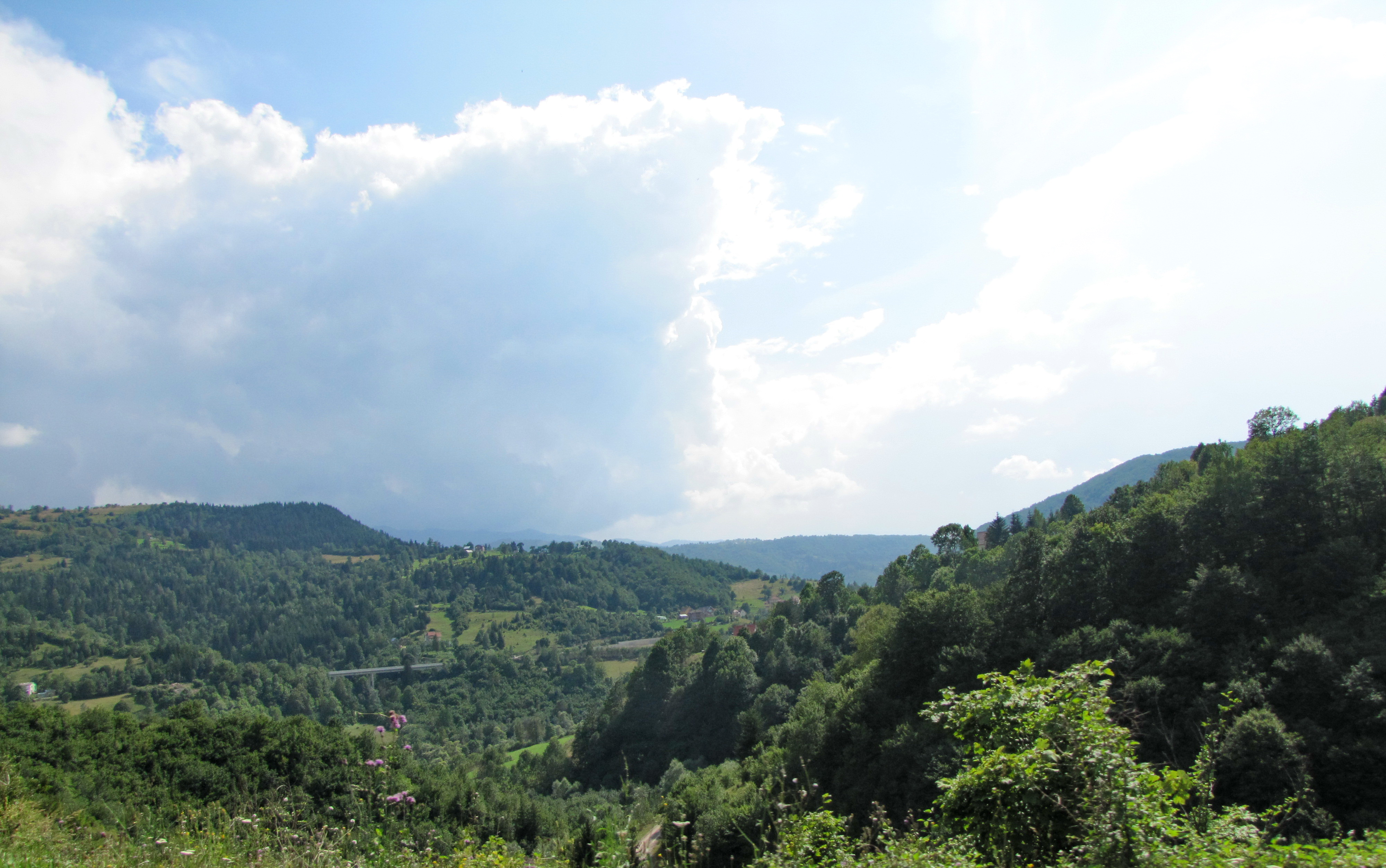

- Location within Serbia
- Coordinates: 42°54′N 20°22′E
- Country: Serbia
- District: Sandzak District
- Municipality: Tutin

Population (2002)
  - Total: 950
- Time zone: UTC+1 (CET)
  - Summer (DST): UTC+2 (CEST)

Draga is a village in the municipality of Tutin, in the Sandzak-Region of southwestern Serbia. According to the 2002 census, the village had a population of 950 people.

== Name ==
This villages name means "dear" in the native Serbian language
