= Draga (surname) =

Draga is a surname.

Those bearing it include:

- Hajdin bej Draga (fl. 1910s), Albanian activist
- Nexhip Draga (1867–1920), Albanian politician

== See also ==
- Draga (given name)
