= Gorenja Vas, Ivančna Gorica =

Gorenja Vas
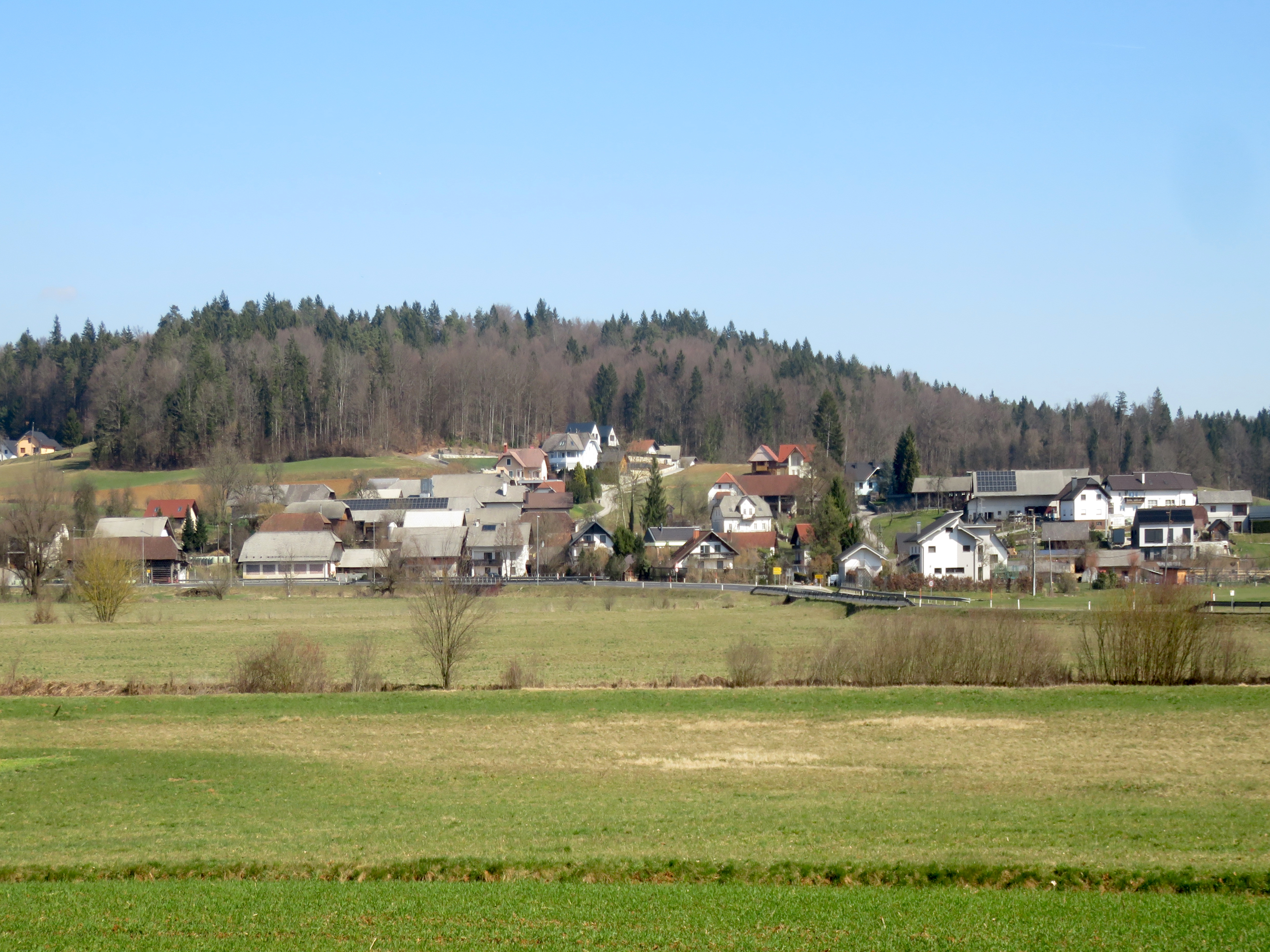

- Location in Slovenia
- Coordinates: 45°55′4.97″N 14°48′27.99″E
- Country: Slovenia
- Traditional region: Lower Carniola
- Statistical region: Central Slovenia
- Municipality: Ivančna Gorica

Area
  - Total: 1.24 km^{2} (0.48 sq mi)
- Elevation: 318.9 m (1,046 ft)

Population (2002)
  - Total: 89

Gorenja Vas (pronounced [ɡɔˈɾeːnja ˈʋaːs]; Slovene: Gorenja vas, German: Oberdorf) is a small village in the Municipality of Ivančna Gorica in central Slovenia. It lies just off the regional road leading south out of Ivančna Gorica towards Muljava. The area is part of the historical region of Lower Carniola. The municipality is now included in the Central Slovenia Statistical Region.
