= Čelevec, Šmarješke Toplice =

Čelevec
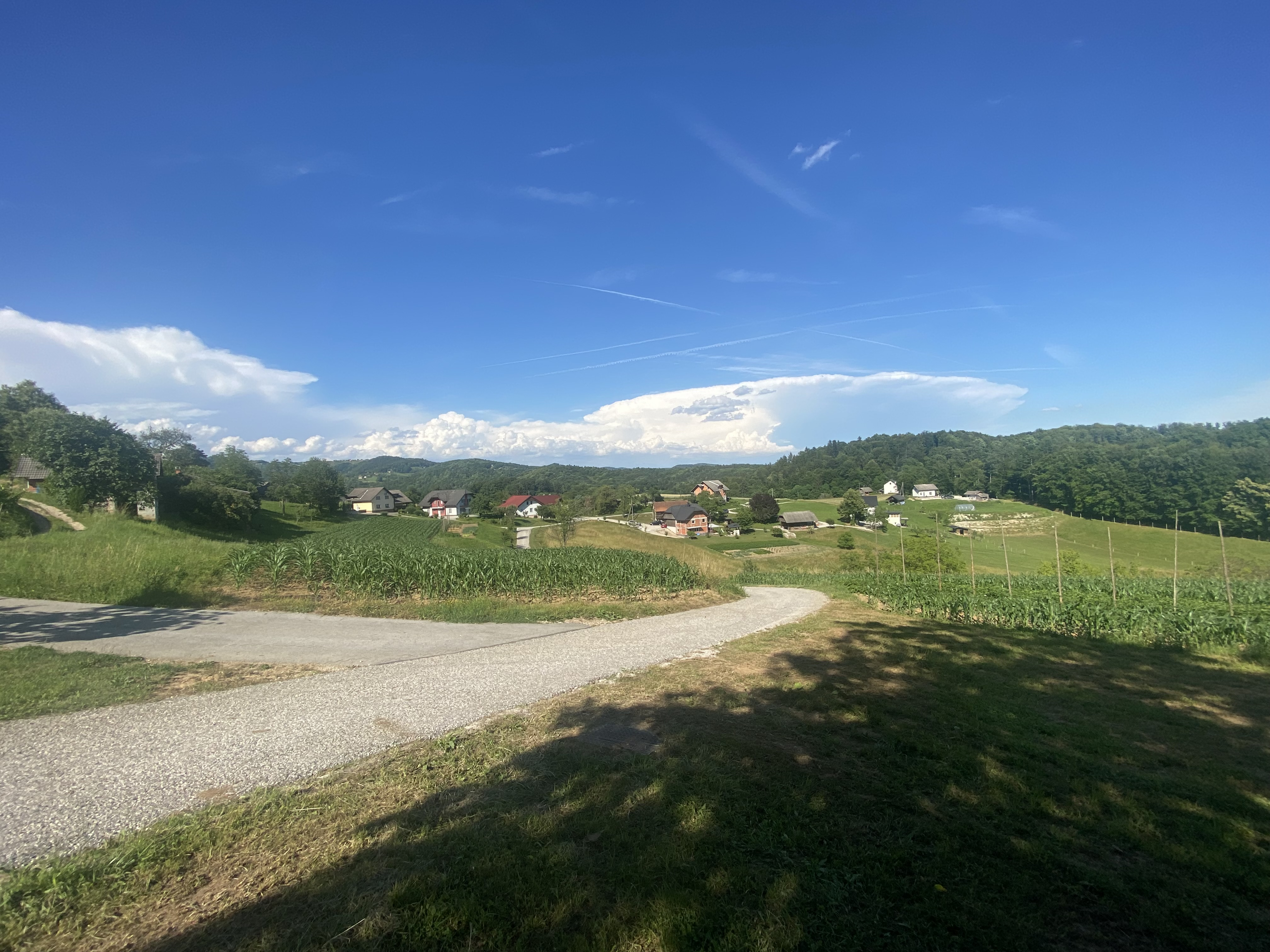

- Location in Slovenia
- Coordinates: 45°55′15.42″N 15°13′28.94″E
- Country: Slovenia
- Traditional region: Lower Carniola
- Statistical region: Southeast Slovenia
- Municipality: Šmarješke Toplice

Area
  - Total: 1.21 km^{2} (0.47 sq mi)
- Elevation: 251.7 m (826 ft)

Population (2002)
  - Total: 52

Čelevec (pronounced [tʃɛˈleːʋəts], German: Tscheleutsch) is a small settlement in the Municipality of Šmarješke Toplice in the historical region of Lower Carniola in southeastern Slovenia. The municipality is now included in the Southeast Slovenia Statistical Region.
