= Spodnja Draga =

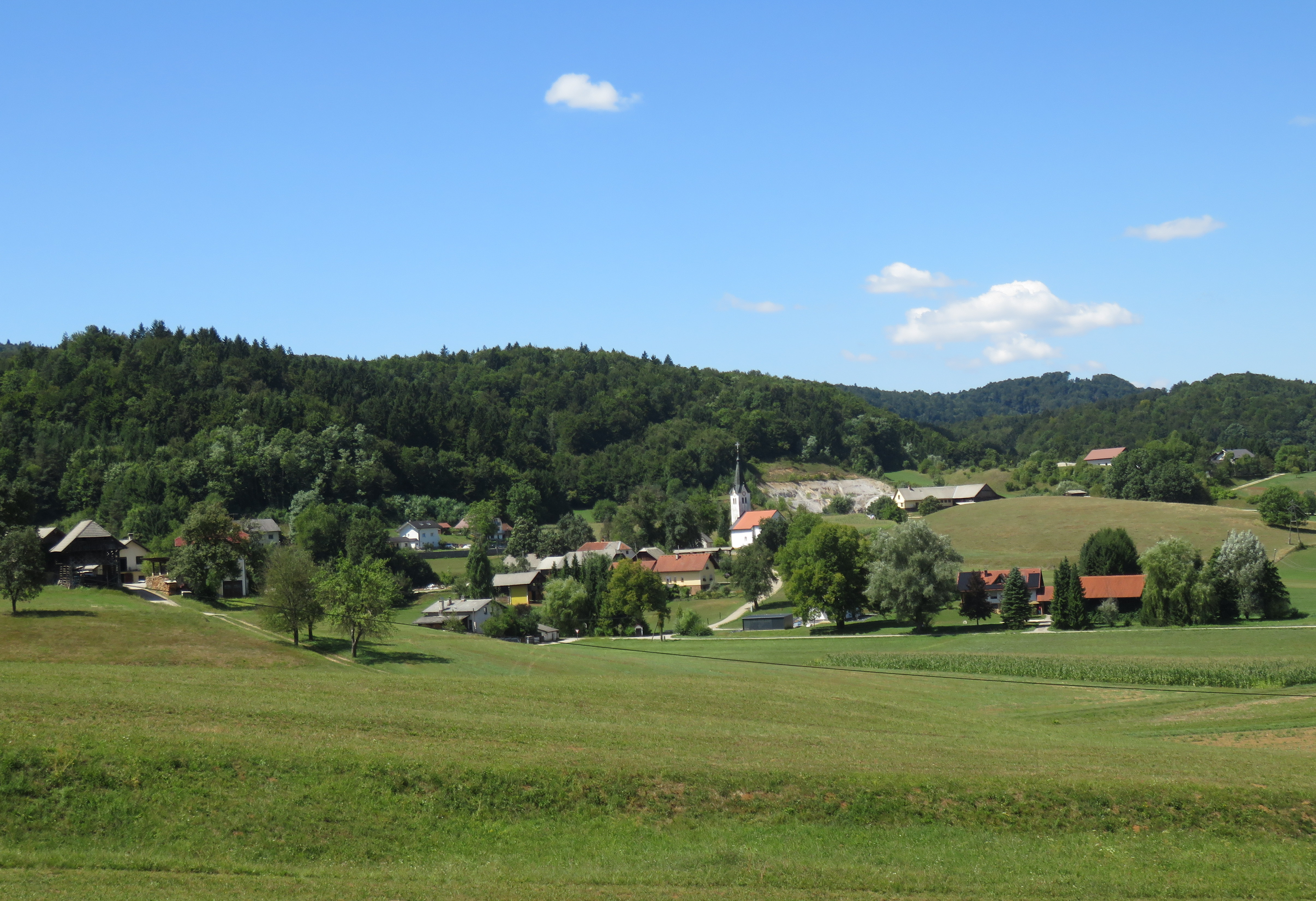

- Location in Slovenia
- Coordinates: 45°56′2.45″N 14°46′46.59″E
- Country: Slovenia
- Traditional region: Lower Carniola
- Statistical region: Central Slovenia
- Municipality: Ivančna Gorica

Area
  - Total: 1.79 km^{2} (0.69 sq mi)
- Elevation: 338.5 m (1,111 ft)

Population (2002)
  - Total: 112

Spodnja Draga (pronounced [ˈspoːdnja ˈdɾaːɡa]) is a village west of Ivančna Gorica in the historical region of Lower Carniola in Slovenia. The Municipality of Ivančna Gorica is included in the Central Slovenia Statistical Region.

== Name ==
The name Spodnja Draga literally means 'lower Draga', distinguishing the settlement from neighboring Zgornja Draga (literally, 'upper Draga'). The name is derived from the Slovene common noun draga 'small, narrow valley', referring to the geographical location of the settlement.

== Church ==
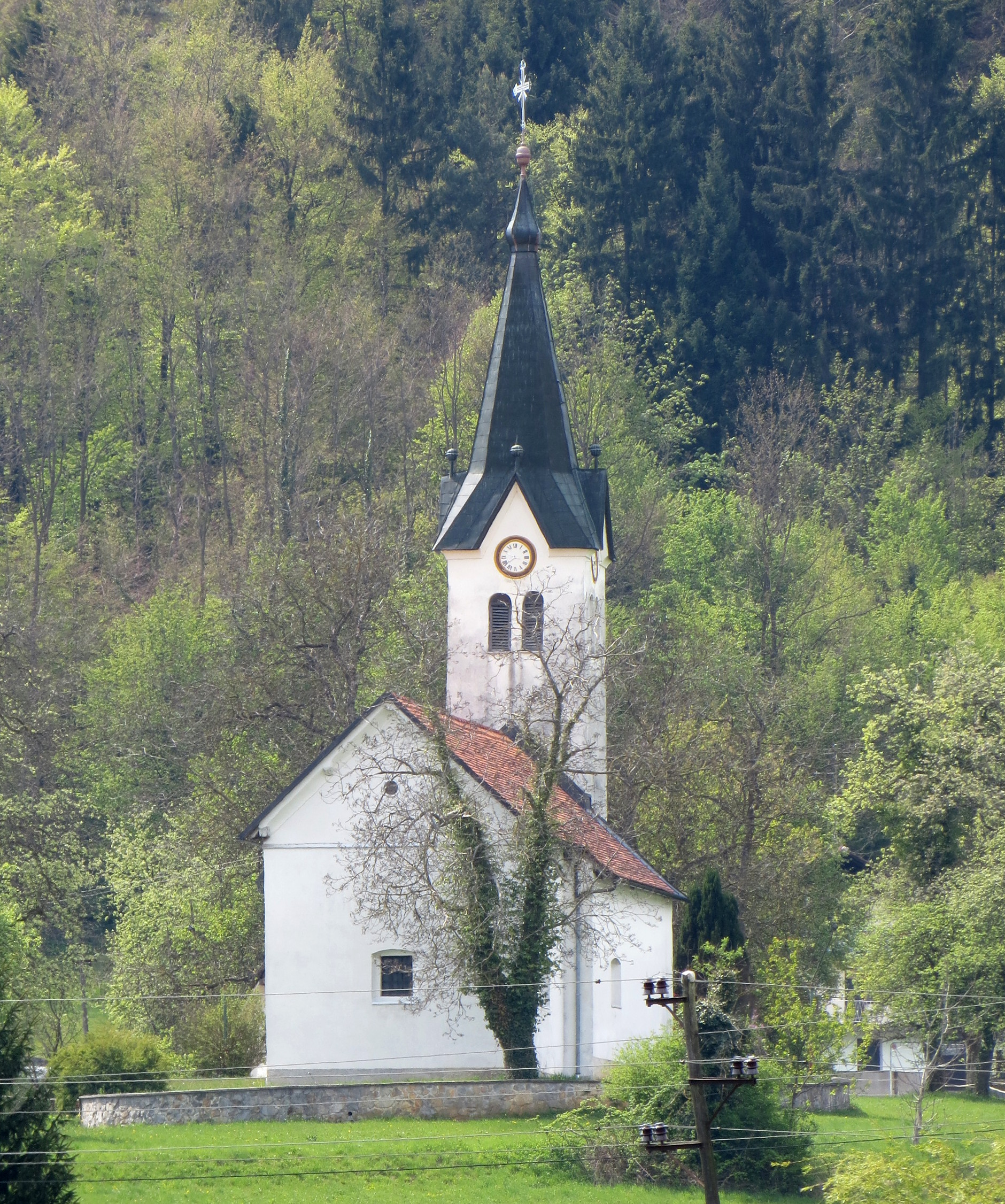
Saint Thomas's Church

The local church is dedicated to Saint Thomas and belongs to the Parish of Ivančna Gorica. It dates to the 14th century.
