= Šmarješke Toplice =

Šmarješke Toplice Toplice (until 1953)
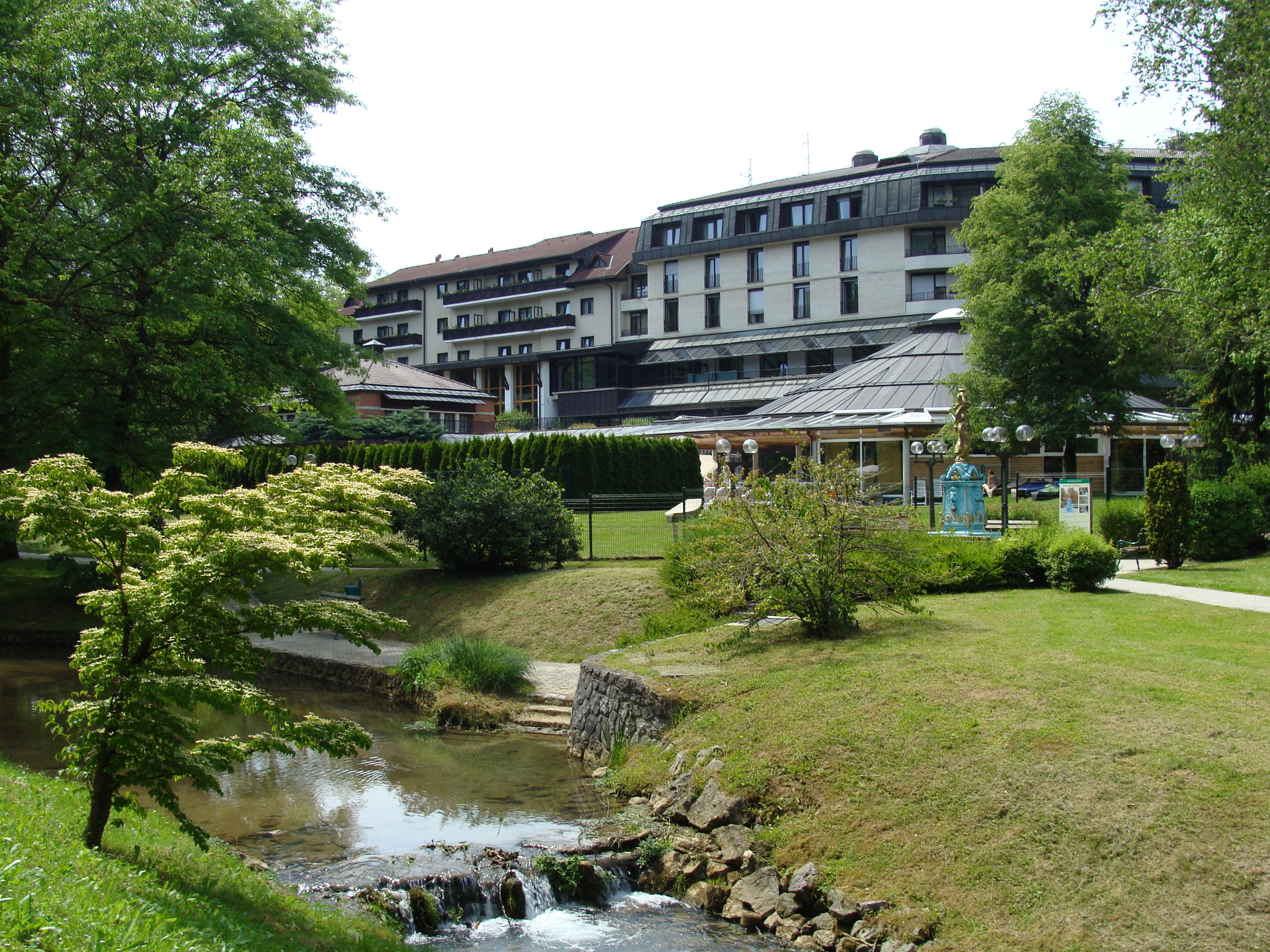
- Thermal spa

- Flag Coat of arms

- Location of the settlement of Šmarješke Toplice in Slovenia
- Coordinates: 45°51′44″N 15°13′17″E
- Country: Slovenia
- Traditional region: Lower Carniola
- Statistical region: Southeast Slovenia
- Municipality: Šmarješke Toplice
- Elevation: 279 m (915 ft)

Population (2002)
  - Total: 492
- Time zone: UTC+01 (CET)
  - Summer (DST): UTC+02 (CEST)

Šmarješke Toplice (pronounced [ʃmaˈɾjeːʃkɛ tɔˈpliːtsɛ]) is a settlement in the traditional region of Lower Carniola in southeastern Slovenia. It is the seat of the Municipality of Šmarješke Toplice. The municipality is now included in the Southeast Slovenia Statistical Region. The settlement is best known for its spa.

== Name ==
The name of the settlement was changed from Toplice to Šmarješke Toplice in 1953.

== Church ==
The local church in Šmarješke Toplice is dedicated to Saint Stephen and belongs to the nearby Parish of Šmarjeta. It is a medieval building that was restyled in the Baroque style in the 18th century.
