= Gorenja Vas pri Čatežu =

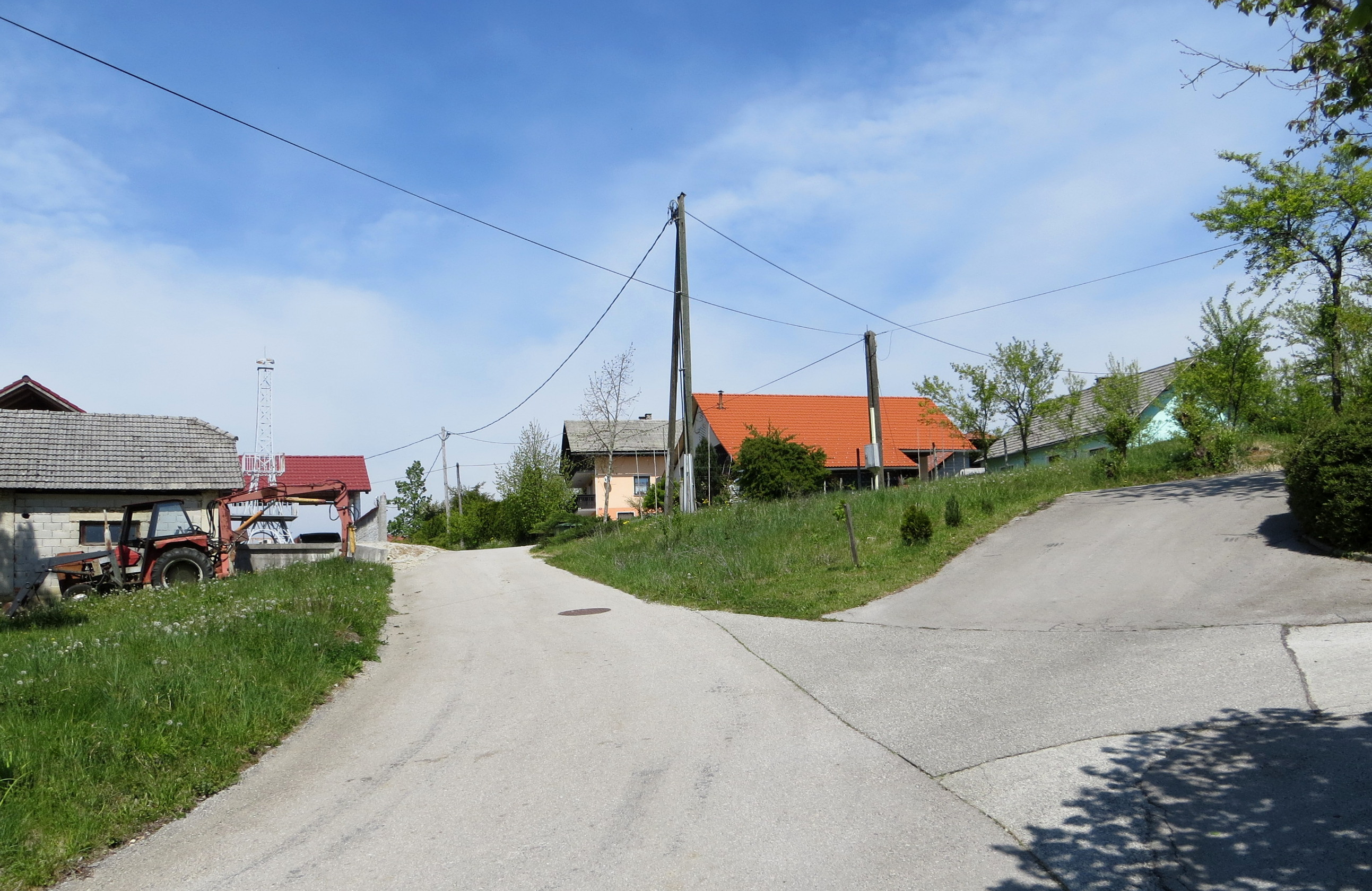

- Location in Slovenia
- Coordinates: 45°57′55.92″N 14°58′21.97″E
- Country: Slovenia
- Traditional region: Lower Carniola
- Statistical region: Southeast Slovenia
- Municipality: Trebnje

Area
  - Total: 0.53 km^{2} (0.20 sq mi)
- Elevation: 442.1 m (1,450 ft)

Population (2002)
  - Total: 31

Gorenja Vas pri Čatežu (pronounced [ɡɔˈɾeːnja ˈʋaːs pɾi ˈtʃaːtɛʒu]; Slovene: Gorenja vas pri Čatežu) is a small settlement to the east of Čatež in the Municipality of Trebnje in eastern Slovenia. The area is part of the traditional region of Lower Carniola and is now included in the Southeast Slovenia Statistical Region.

== Name ==
Gorenja Vas pri Čatežu was attested in historical sources as Obern Szates in 1420, Ober Zathes in 1425, Ober Tschattes in 1448, and Obern Tschates in 1465. The name of the settlement was changed from Gorenja vas to Gorenja vas pri Čatežu in 1953.
