= Mirjana Dragaš =

Serbian politician (born 1950)

Mirjana Dragaš (Serbian Cyrillic: Мирјана Драгаш; born June 6, 1950) is a politician in Serbia. She is currently serving her third term in the National Assembly of Serbia as a member of the Socialist Party of Serbia.

== Early life and career ==
Dragaš was born in Belgrade, then part of the People's Republic of Serbia in the Federal People's Republic of Yugoslavia. She is a graduate of sociology and is administrator of the Dositej Obradović Foundation. Between 1998 and 2000, she was the deputy minister of labour, health, and social security in the Federal Republic of Yugoslavia. Dragaš is the president of the social policy council of the Socialist Party and has served on the party's executive board and women's forum.

== Parliamentarian ==
Dragaš received the twenty-first position on a coalition electoral list led by the Socialist Party in the 2012 Serbian parliamentary election and was elected when the list won forty-four mandates. She received the forty-fifth position on the list in the 2014 election and, as the list once again won forty-four mandates, narrowly missed direct re-election. She was, however, awarded a mandate on May 10, 2014, as a replacement for party leader Ivica Dačić, who had resigned to take a cabinet position. During this sitting of the assembly, she served as deputy chair of the committee on labour, social issues, social inclusion, and poverty reduction.

She received the thirty-ninth list position in the 2016 parliamentary election; as the Socialist-led list won twenty-nine mandates, she once again missed direct election. She was able to take her seat on October 12, 2017, as a replacement for Ivan Karić, who had resigned. The Socialist Party has been part of Serbia's coalition government since 2008, and Dragaš has been part of the government's parliamentary majority throughout her time in the assembly.
