= Sajevec =

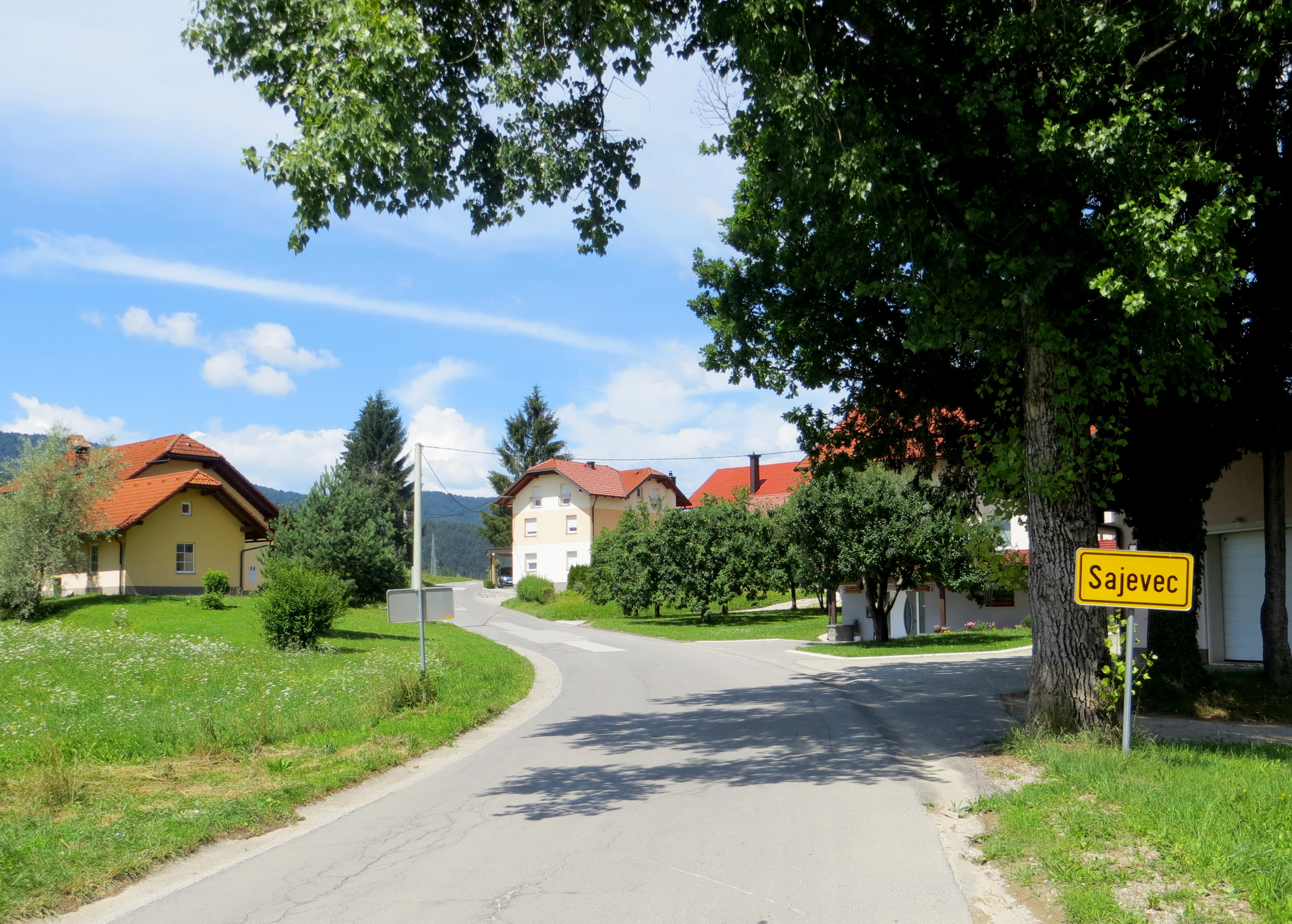

- Location in Slovenia
- Coordinates: 45°44′36.07″N 14°42′8.91″E
- Country: Slovenia
- Traditional region: Lower Carniola
- Statistical region: Southeast Slovenia
- Municipality: Ribnica

Area
  - Total: 1.13 km^{2} (0.44 sq mi)
- Elevation: 505.3 m (1,658 ft)

Population (2002)
  - Total: 151
- Postal code: 1310

Sajevec (pronounced [ˈsaːjɛʋəts]; German: Sajowitz) is a village west of the town of Ribnica in southern Slovenia. The area is part of the traditional region of Lower Carniola and is now included in the Southeast Slovenia Statistical Region.

== Name ==
Sajevec was attested in written sources in German in 1332 as Růzpach, referring to the creek there (and as Růspach in 1350 and Ruͤzzpach in 1368). The medieval names are a compound of the Middle High German element ruoʒ 'soot(y), black' + bach 'creek', probably referring to the dark soil that the creek runs through or its turbid water (cf. also Rußbach, now Blatnik pri Črmošnjicah). The Slovene name Sajevec contains the root saje 'soot', semantically corresponding to the medieval German name. In modern German, the village was known as Sajowitz, a name borrowed from Slovene.

== Church ==
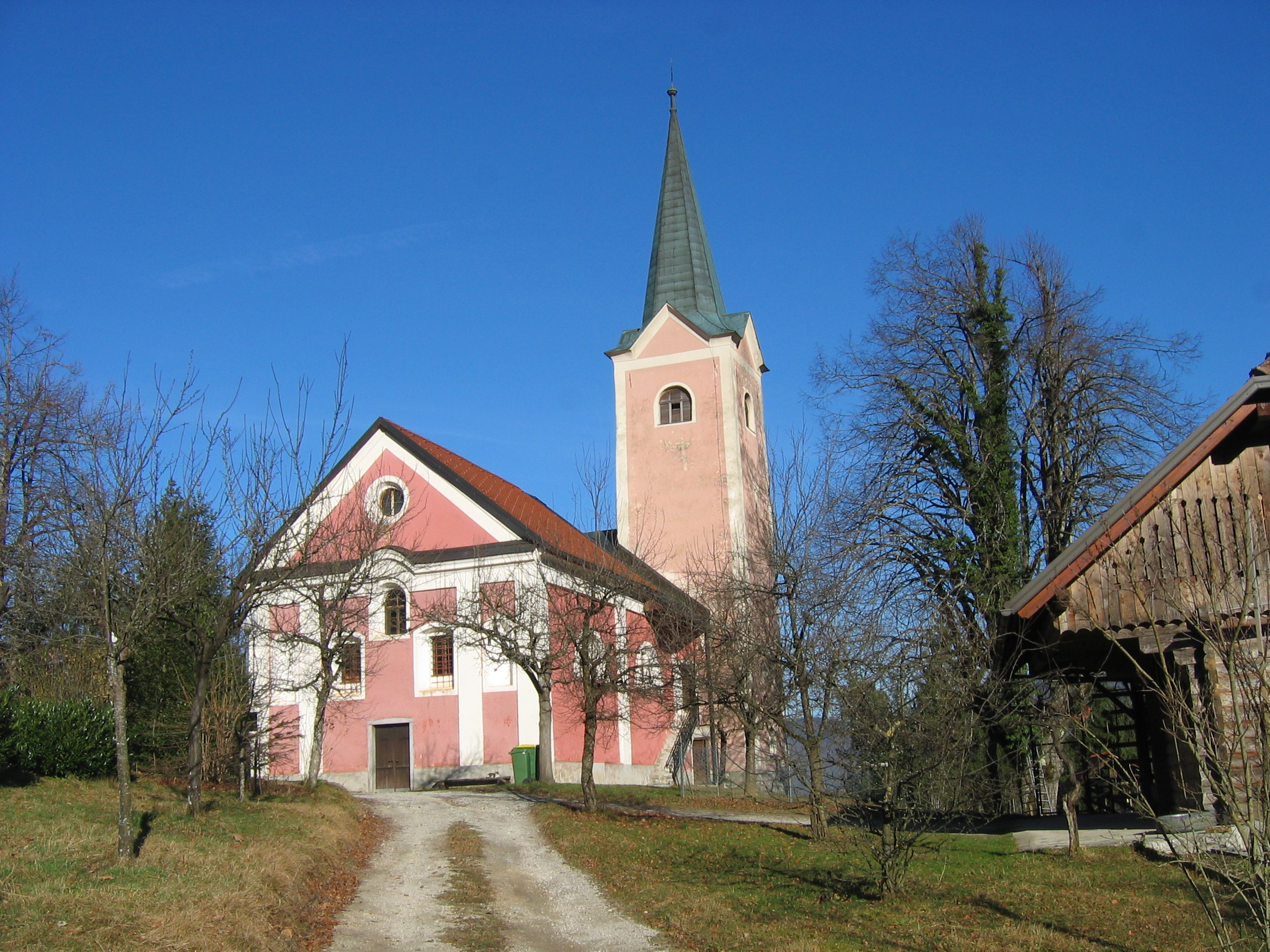
Saint Francis Xavier Church

The local church, built on a small hill southwest of the settlement, is dedicated to Saint Francis Xavier and belongs to the Parish of Ribnica. It is a single-naved building that was built between 1721 and 1730 and dedicated in 1743.
