= Sela pri Zburah =

- Location in Slovenia
- Coordinates: 45°53′54.11″N 15°13′32.32″E
- Country: Slovenia
- Traditional region: Lower Carniola
- Statistical region: Southeast Slovenia
- Municipality: Šmarješke Toplice

Area
  - Total: 0.79 km^{2} (0.31 sq mi)
- Elevation: 343.6 m (1,127 ft)

Population (2002)
  - Total: 22

Sela pri Zburah (pronounced [ˈseːla pɾi ˈzbuːɾax]) is a small settlement in the historical region of Lower Carniola in southeastern Slovenia. It belongs to the Municipality of Šmarješke Toplice. The municipality is now included in the Southeast Slovenia Statistical Region.

== Name ==
The name of the settlement was changed from Sela to Sela pri Zburah in 1953.
