= Zgornja Draga =

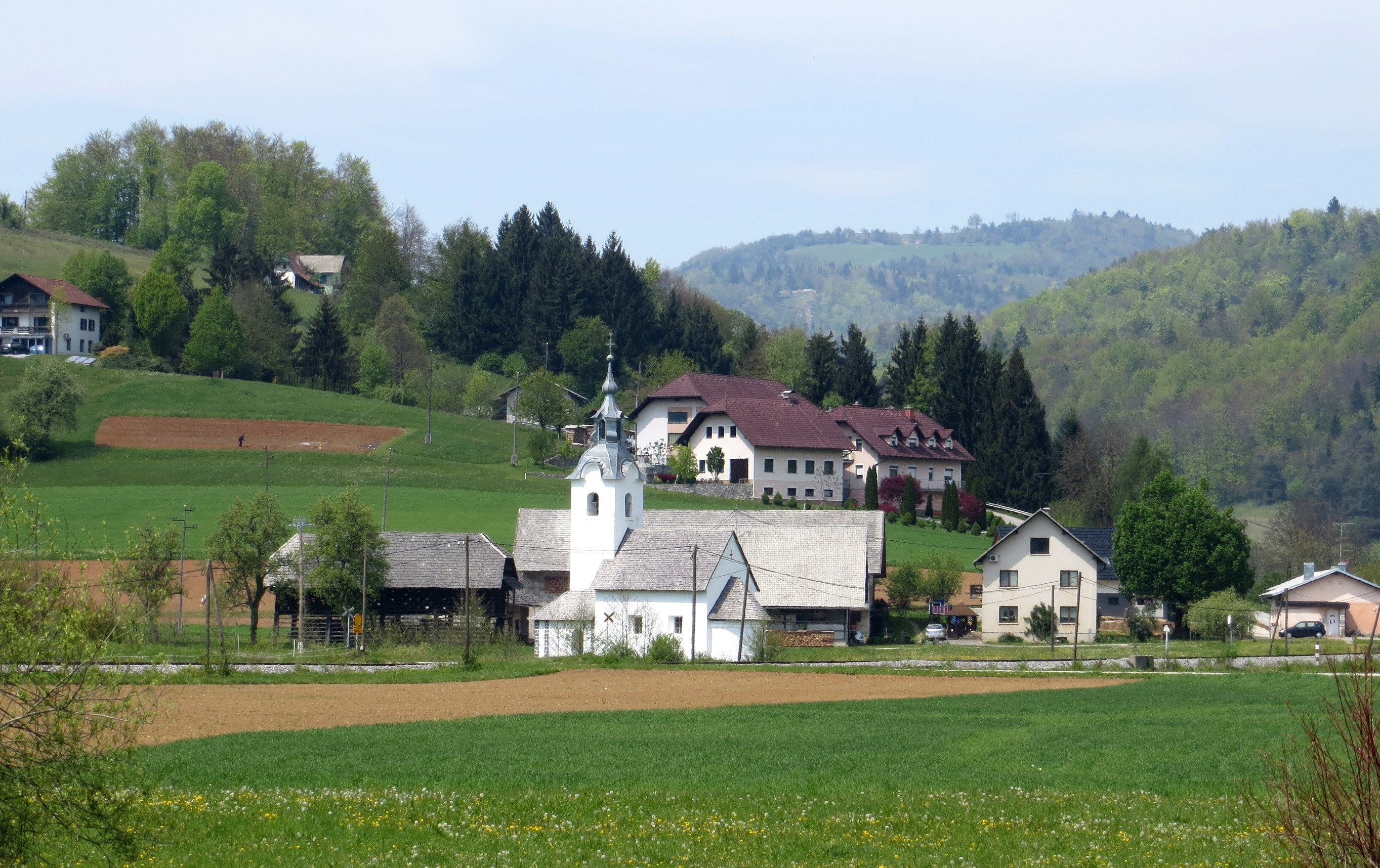

- Location in Slovenia
- Coordinates: 45°56′26.42″N 14°46′45.11″E
- Country: Slovenia
- Traditional region: Lower Carniola
- Statistical region: Central Slovenia
- Municipality: Ivančna Gorica

Area
  - Total: 2.34 km^{2} (0.90 sq mi)
- Elevation: 334.6 m (1,098 ft)

Population (2002)
  - Total: 131

Zgornja Draga (pronounced [ˈzɡoːɾnja ˈdɾaːɡa]) is a settlement just west of Ivančna Gorica in the historical region of Lower Carniola in central Slovenia. The Municipality of Ivančna Gorica is included in the Central Slovenia Statistical Region.

== Name ==
The name Zgornja Draga literally means 'upper Draga', distinguishing the settlement from neighboring Spodnja Draga (literally, 'lower Draga'). The name is derived from the Slovene common noun draga 'small, narrow valley', referring to the geographical location of the settlement.

== Church ==
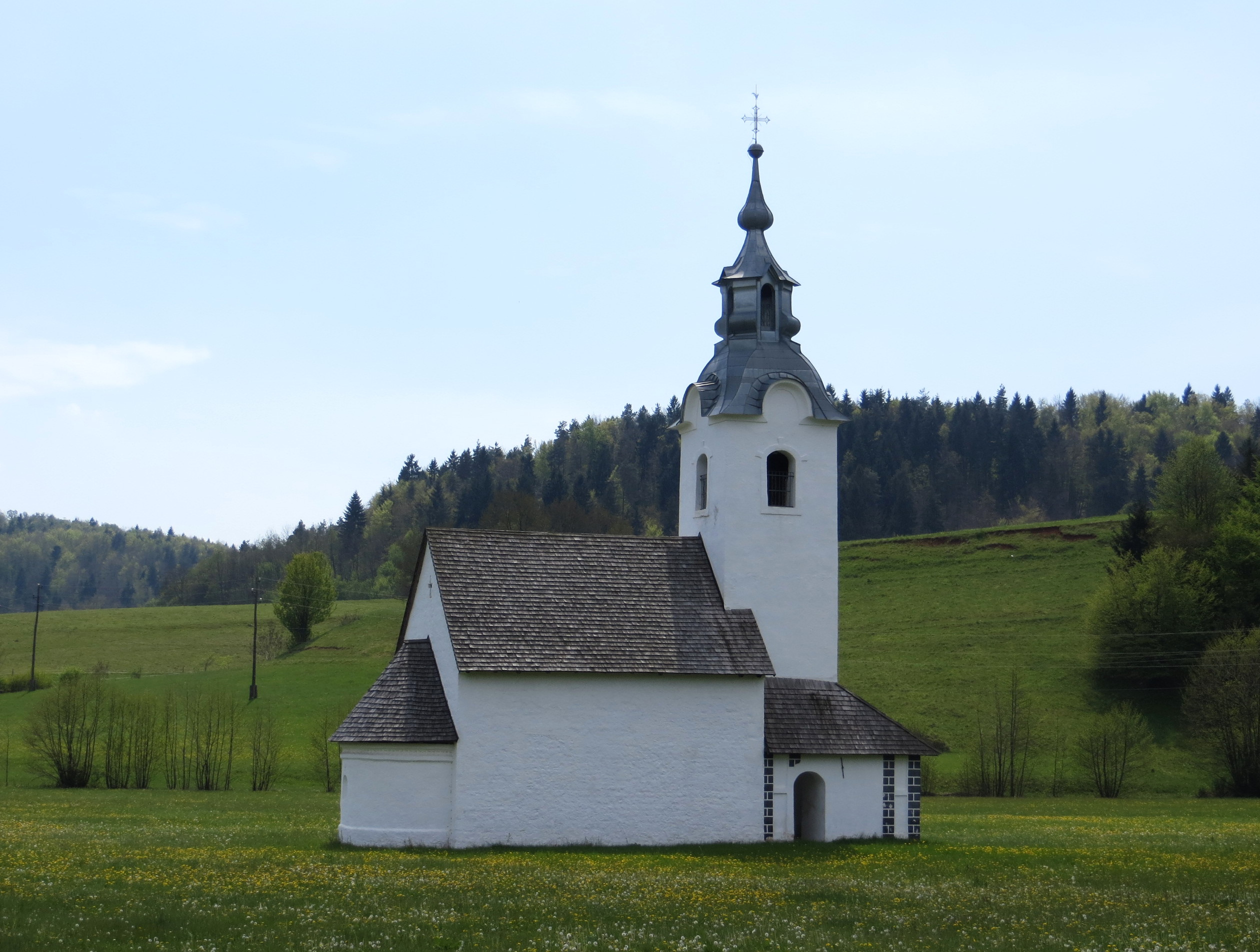
Saint Martin's Church

The local church is dedicated to Saint Martin and belongs to the Parish of Višnja Gora. It dates to the 12th century and has an 18th-century belfry.
