= Bela Cerkev =

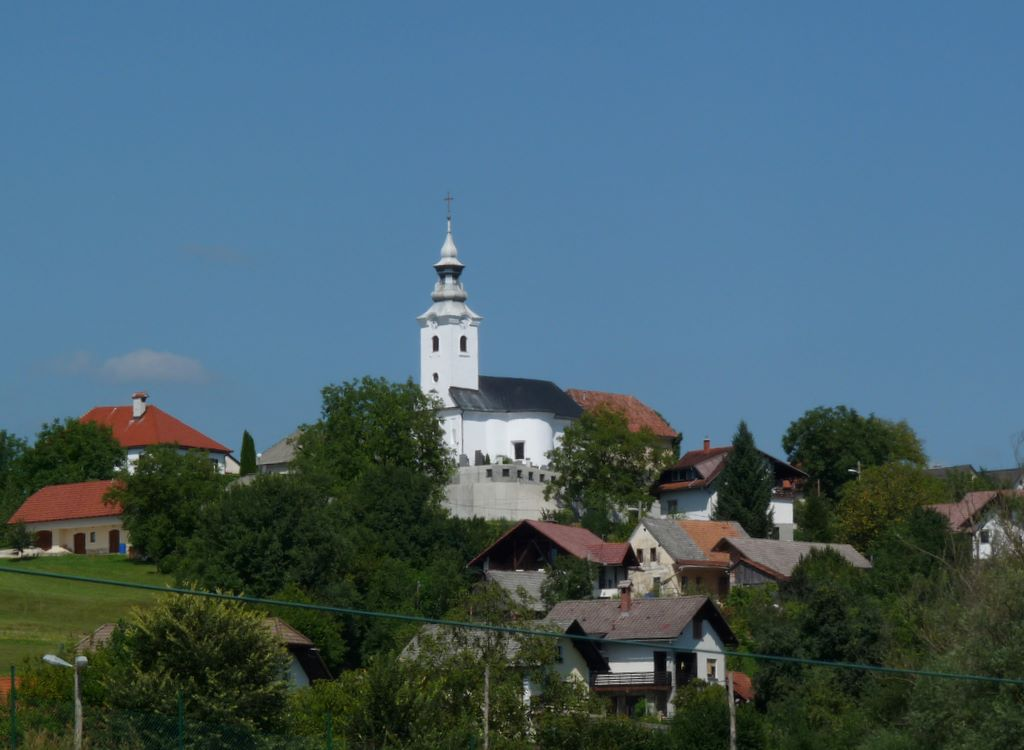

- Location in Slovenia
- Coordinates: 45°52′0.02″N 15°16′30.84″E
- Country: Slovenia
- Traditional region: Lower Carniola
- Statistical region: Southeast Slovenia
- Municipality: Šmarješke Toplice

Area
  - Total: 0.74 km^{2} (0.29 sq mi)
- Elevation: 190.4 m (625 ft)

Population (2002)
  - Total: 107

Bela Cerkev (pronounced [ˈbeːla ˈtseːɾkɛu̯]) is a settlement on the right bank of the Krka River in the Municipality of Šmarješke Toplice in southeastern Slovenia. The area is part of the historical region of Lower Carniola. The municipality is now included in the Southeast Slovenia Statistical Region.

== Name ==
Bela Cerkev was attested as Alba eccclesia in 1283 and Weysenchirchen in 1296, among other spellings of these names. All these names mean 'white church'.

== Church ==
The local parish church is dedicated to Saint Andrew and belongs to the Roman Catholic Diocese of Novo Mesto. It was built in 1813 on the site of an earlier building.
