= Šmarjeta =

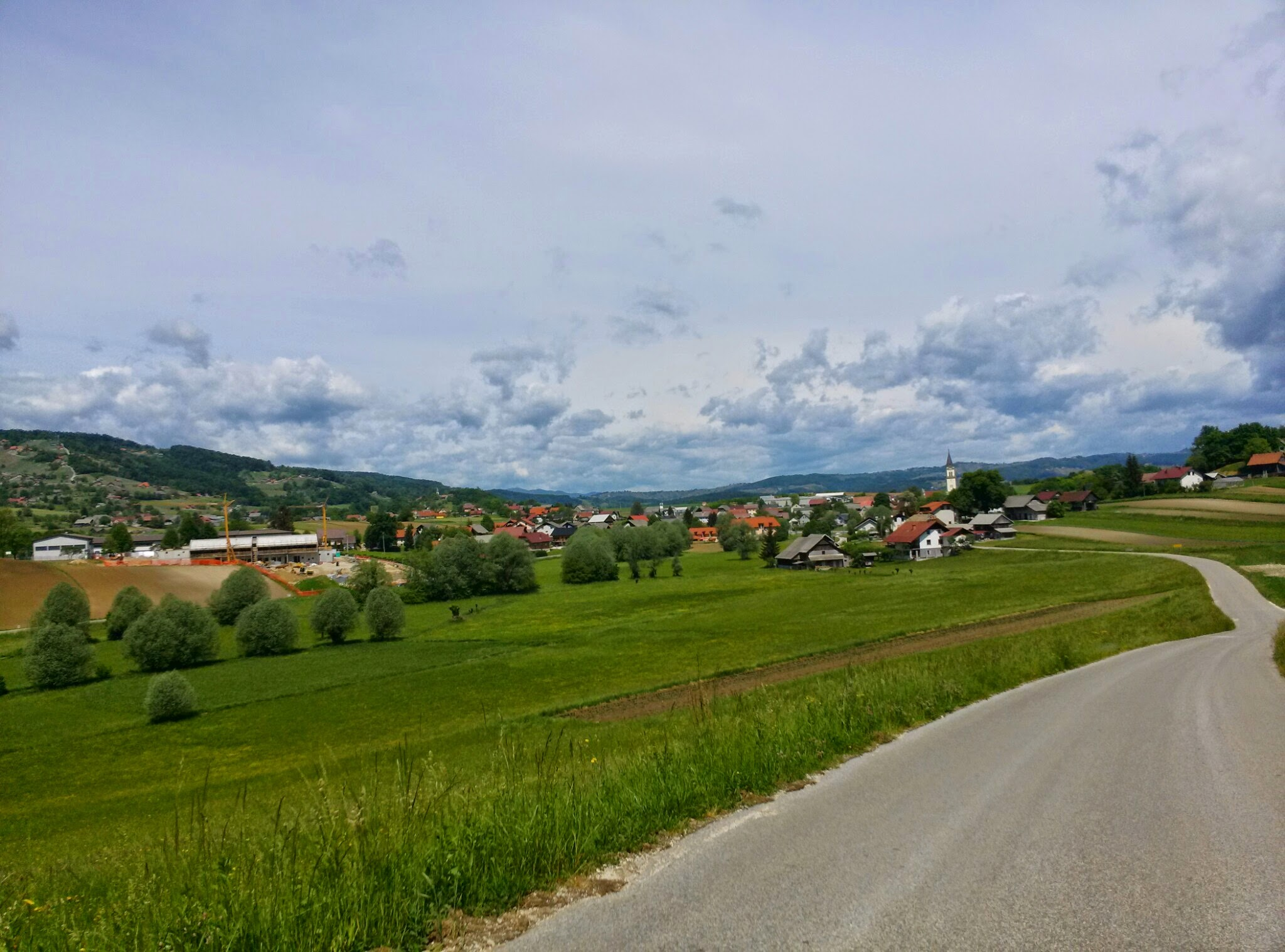

- Location in Slovenia
- Coordinates: 45°53′12.78″N 15°15′3.07″E
- Country: Slovenia
- Traditional region: Lower Carniola
- Statistical region: Southeast Slovenia
- Municipality: Šmarješke Toplice

Area
  - Total: 1.58 km^{2} (0.61 sq mi)
- Elevation: 189.8 m (623 ft)

Population (2002)
  - Total: 288

Šmarjeta (pronounced [ʃmaˈɾjéːta]; German: Sankt Margarethen) is a village in the Municipality of Šmarješke Toplice in southeastern Slovenia. The area is part of the historical region of Lower Carniola. The municipality is now included in the Southeast Slovenia Statistical Region. The village includes the hamlet of Dolenja Vas (Slovene: Dolenja vas, German: Unterdorf), formerly an independent village.

The local parish church from which the settlement gets its name is dedicated to Saint Margaret (Slovene: sveta Marjeta) and belongs to the Roman Catholic Diocese of Novo Mesto. It was built between 1910 and 1927 on the site of an earlier building.

== Notable people ==
Notable people that were born or lived in Šmarjeta include:

- Karel Bačer (1917–2008), literary historian, lexicographer, and educator
- Jože Karlovšek (1900–1963), Slovenian ethnographer, builder and ornamental painter
- Janez Volčič (1825–1887), priest and writer
