= Pugled =

Pugled may refer to several places in Slovenia:

- Pugled pri Karlovici, a settlement in the Municipality of Ribnica
- Pugled pri Mokronogu, a settlement in the Municipality of Mokronog–Trebelno
- Pugled pri Starem Logu, a settlement in the Municipality of Kočevje
- Pugled, Semič, a settlement in the Municipality of Semič
