= Ribjek, Mokronog-Trebelno =

Ribjek
- Location in Slovenia
- Coordinates: 45°56′20.42″N 15°7′43.79″E
- Country: Slovenia
- Traditional region: Lower Carniola
- Statistical region: Southeast Slovenia
- Municipality: Mokronog-Trebelno

Area
  - Total: 0.33 km^{2} (0.13 sq mi)
- Elevation: 257.2 m (844 ft)

Population (2002)
  - Total: 26

Ribjek (pronounced [ˈɾiːbjɛk]) is a small settlement in the Municipality of Mokronog-Trebelno in southeastern Slovenia. It lies just west of Mokronog, south of Beli Grič. The area is part of the historical region of Lower Carniola. The municipality is now included in the Southeast Slovenia Statistical Region.
