= Radna Vas =

- Location in Slovenia
- Coordinates: 45°53′59.9″N 15°6′44.53″E
- Country: Slovenia
- Traditional region: Lower Carniola
- Statistical region: Southeast Slovenia
- Municipality: Mokronog-Trebelno

Area
  - Total: 2.74 km^{2} (1.06 sq mi)
- Elevation: 407 m (1,335 ft)

Population (2002)
  - Total: 44

Radna Vas (pronounced [ˈɾaːdna ˈʋaːs]; Slovene: Radna vas, in older sources also Radnja Vas) is a small settlement in the Municipality of Mokronog-Trebelno in southeastern Slovenia. It lies in the hills west of Trebelno between Bitnja Vas and Poljane pri Mirni Peči. The area is part of the historical region of Lower Carniola. The municipality is now included in the Southeast Slovenia Statistical Region.
