= Jelševec =

Jelševec is a Slovene place name that may refer to:

- Jelševec, Krško, a village in the Municipality of Krško, southeastern Slovenia
- Jelševec, Mokronog-Trebelno, a village in the Municipality of Mokronog-Trebelno, southeastern Slovenia
