= Gorenji Mokronog =

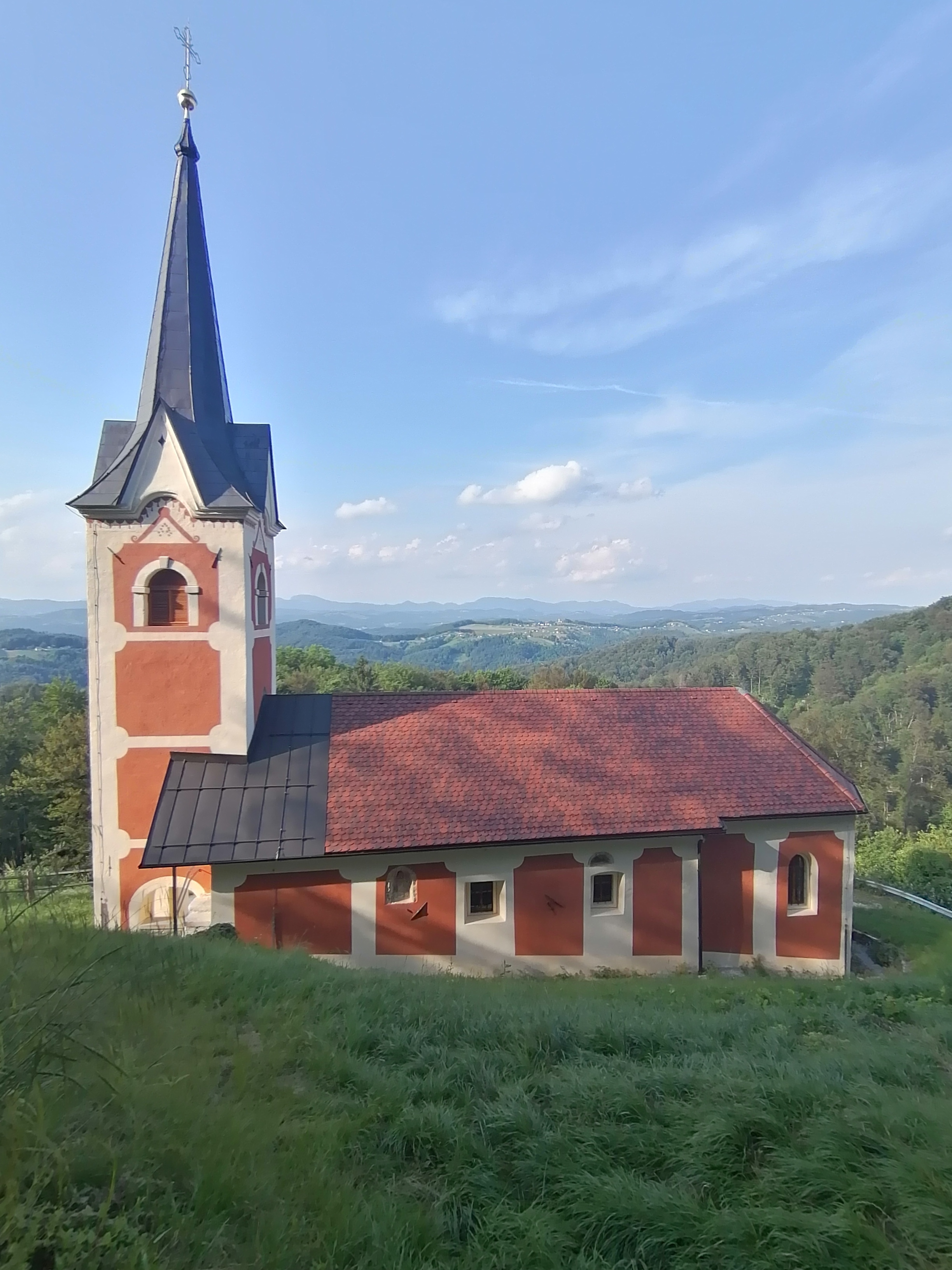

- Location in Slovenia
- Coordinates: 45°55′27.86″N 15°8′52.36″E
- Country: Slovenia
- Traditional region: Lower Carniola
- Statistical region: Southeast Slovenia
- Municipality: Mokronog-Trebelno

Area
  - Total: 1.57 km^{2} (0.61 sq mi)
- Elevation: 416.8 m (1,367 ft)

Population (2002)
  - Total: 15

Gorenji Mokronog (pronounced [ɡɔˈɾeːnji mɔˈkɾoːnɔk]; German: Obernassenfuß) is a dispersed settlement in the Municipality of Mokronog-Trebelno in southeastern Slovenia. It lies in the hills south of Mokronog in the historical region of Lower Carniola. The municipality is now included in the Southeast Slovenia Statistical Region.

The local church in the settlement is dedicated to Saint Peter. Until 1803 it was the parish church, but the parish was then moved to Trebelno. It is a medieval building with numerous later alterations.
