= Ostrožnik =

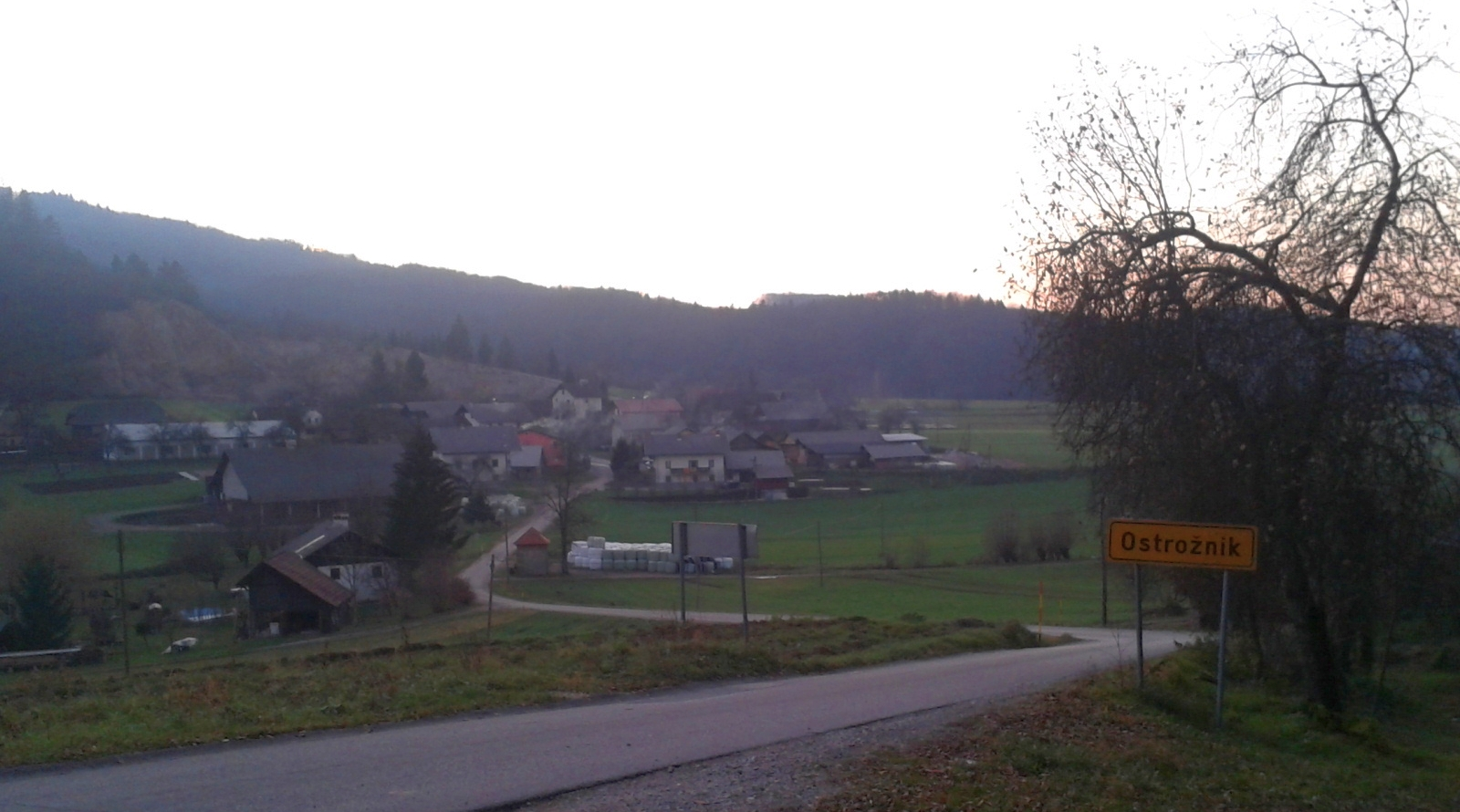

- Location in Slovenia
- Coordinates: 45°56′30.18″N 15°7′5.27″E
- Country: Slovenia
- Traditional region: Lower Carniola
- Statistical region: Southeast Slovenia
- Municipality: Mokronog-Trebelno

Area
  - Total: 0.86 km^{2} (0.33 sq mi)
- Elevation: 248.4 m (815 ft)

Population (2023)
  - Total: 56

Ostrožnik (pronounced [ɔˈstɾoːʒnik]; German: Ostroschnik) is a small village east of Mokronog in the Municipality of Mokronog-Trebelno in southeastern Slovenia. The municipality is part of the historical region of Lower Carniola and is now included in the Southeast Slovenia Statistical Region.
