= Srednje Laknice =

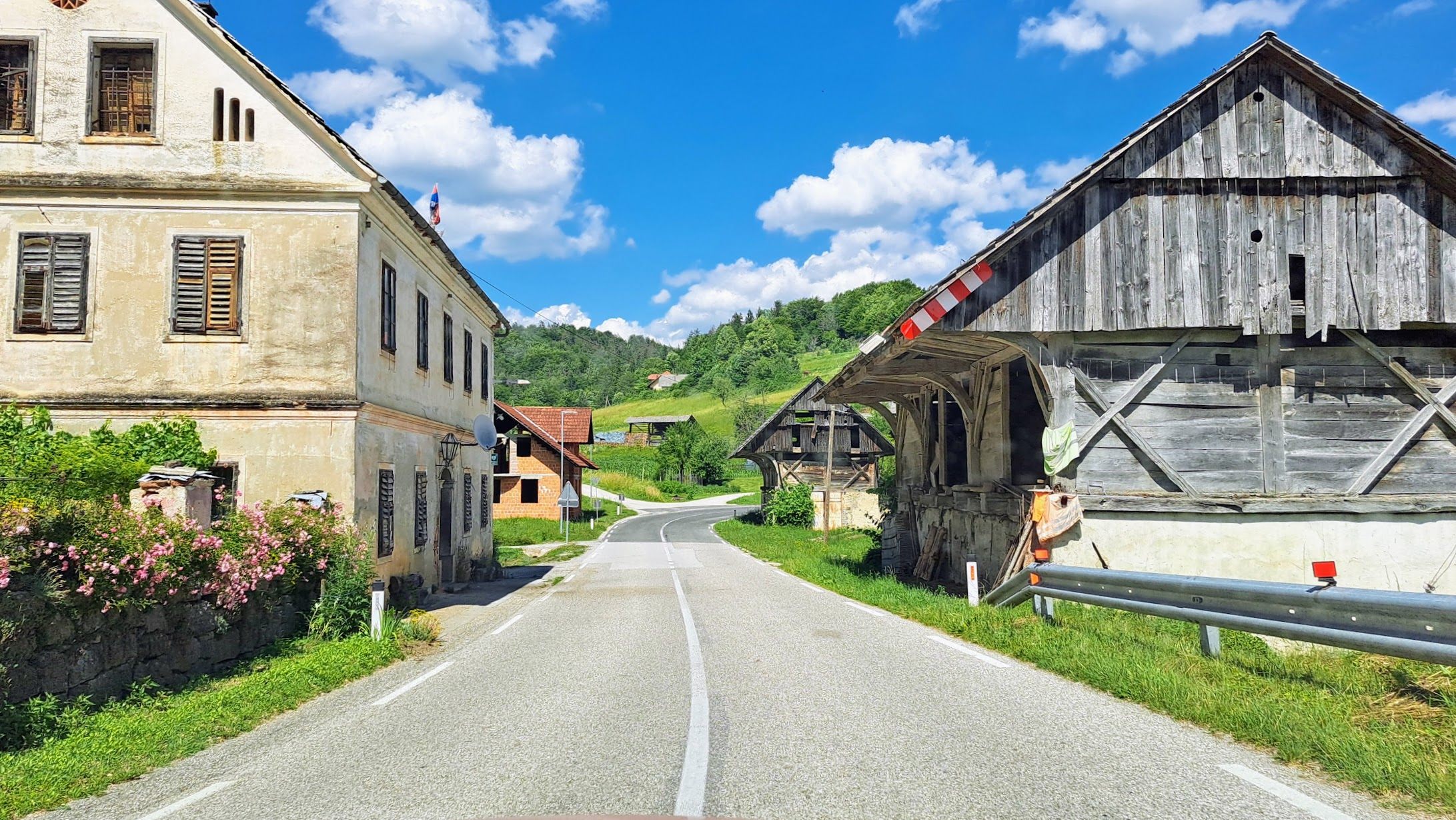

- Location in Slovenia
- Coordinates: 45°56′2.98″N 15°11′1.05″E
- Country: Slovenia
- Traditional region: Lower Carniola
- Statistical region: Southeast Slovenia
- Municipality: Mokronog-Trebelno

Area
  - Total: 2.44 km^{2} (0.94 sq mi)
- Elevation: 251.5 m (825 ft)

Population (2002)
  - Total: 38

Srednje Laknice (pronounced [ˈsɾeːdnjɛ ˈlaːknitsɛ]; German: Mitterlaknitz) is a settlement east of Mokronog in the Municipality of Mokronog-Trebelno in the historical region of Lower Carniola in southeastern Slovenia. The municipality is now included in the Southeast Slovenia Statistical Region.
