= Sveti Vrh =

Sveti Vrh Vrh nad Mokronogom (1955–1992)
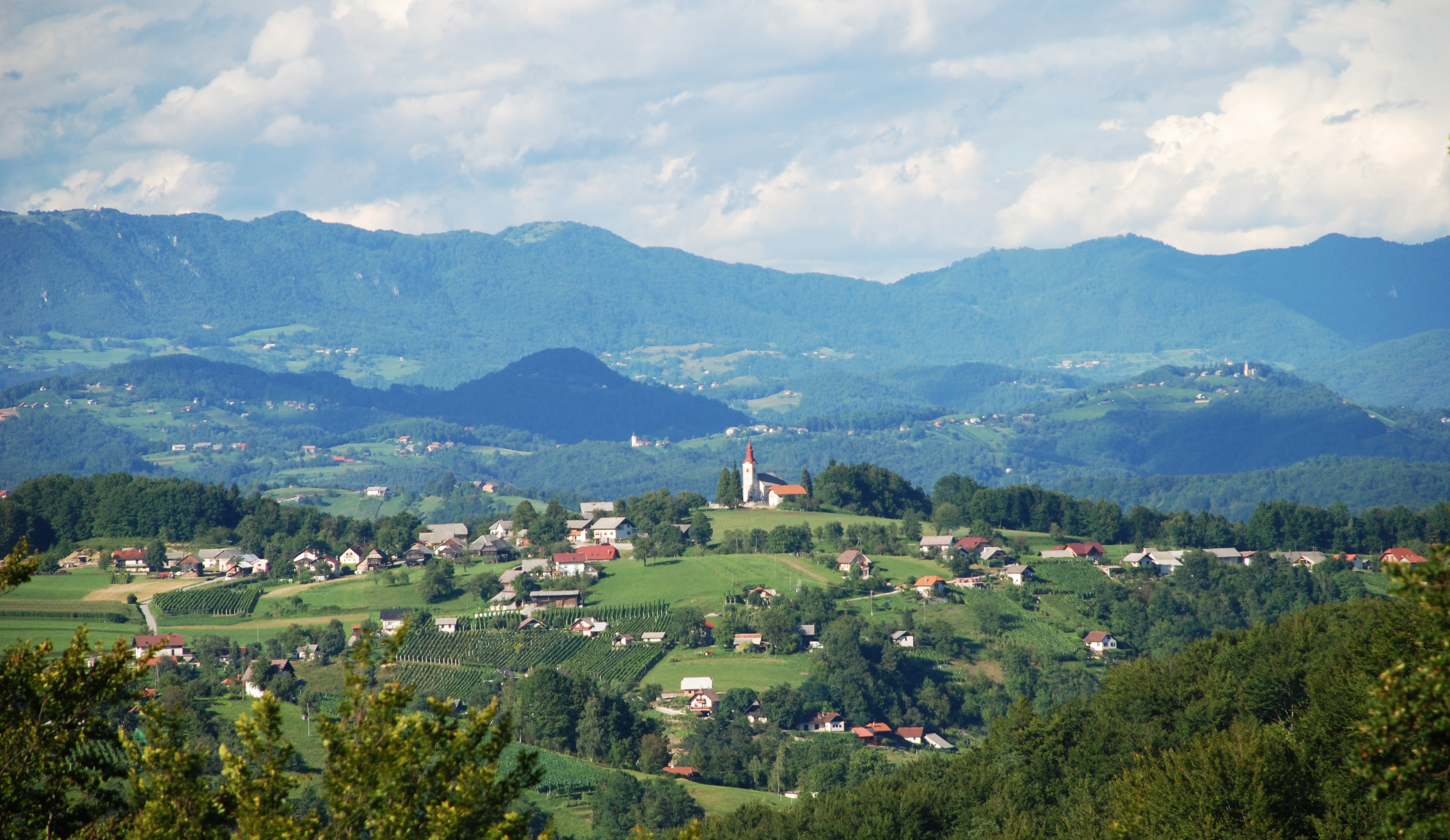

- Location in Slovenia
- Coordinates: 45°56′29.61″N 15°10′22.6″E
- Country: Slovenia
- Traditional region: Lower Carniola
- Statistical region: Southeast Slovenia
- Municipality: Mokronog-Trebelno

Area
  - Total: 1.74 km^{2} (0.67 sq mi)
- Elevation: 377.1 m (1,237 ft)

Population (2002)
  - Total: 92

Sveti Vrh (pronounced [ˈsʋeːti ˈʋəɾx]; German: Heiligenberg) is a settlement in the hills east of Mokronog in the Municipality of Mokronog-Trebelno in southeastern Slovenia. The area is part of the historical region of Lower Carniola. The municipality is now included in the Southeast Slovenia Statistical Region.

== Name ==
The name of the settlement was changed from Sveti Vrh (literally, 'holy peak') to Vrh nad Mokronogom (literally, 'peak above Mokronog') in 1955. The name was changed on the basis of the 1948 Law on Names of Settlements and Designations of Squares, Streets, and Buildings as part of efforts by Slovenia's postwar communist government to remove religious elements from toponyms. The name Sveti Vrh was restored in 1992. In the past the German name was Heiligenberg.

== Church ==
The local church is dedicated to the Assumption of Mary and belongs to the Parish of Mokronog. It dates to the early 15th century and preserves frescos dating to around 1430 on its interior walls. It was restyled in the Baroque in the 18th century.
