= Bruna Vas =

- Location in Slovenia
- Coordinates: 45°57′25.73″N 15°9′24.72″E
- Country: Slovenia
- Traditional region: Lower Carniola
- Statistical region: Southeast Slovenia
- Municipality: Mokronog-Trebelno

Area
  - Total: 1.2 km^{2} (0.46 sq mi)
- Elevation: 260.1 m (853 ft)

Population (2002)
  - Total: 48

Bruna Vas (pronounced [ˈbɾuːna ˈʋaːs]; Slovene: Bruna vas) is a small settlement in the Municipality of Mokronog-Trebelno in southeastern Slovenia. It lies on the regional road to Sevnica, just north of Mokronog on the right bank of the Mirna River. The area is part of the historical region of Lower Carniola. The municipality is now included in the Southeast Slovenia Statistical Region.
