= Podturn =

Podturn may refer to:

- Podturn, Rogaška Slatina, a village in the Municipality of Rogaška Slatina, eastern Slovenia
- Podturn, Mokronog-Trebelno, a village in the Municipality of Mokronog-Trebelno, southeastern Slovenia
- Podturn pri Dolenjskih Toplicah, a village in the Municipality of Dolenjske Toplice, southeastern Slovenia
- Tivoli Castle, originally named Podturn Manor, Ljubljana (the capital of Slovenia)
