= Martinja Vas pri Mokronogu =

- Location in Slovenia
- Coordinates: 45°57′7.7″N 15°7′57.83″E
- Country: Slovenia
- Traditional region: Lower Carniola
- Statistical region: Southeast Slovenia
- Municipality: Mokronog-Trebelno

Area
  - Total: 1.56 km^{2} (0.60 sq mi)
- Elevation: 256.6 m (842 ft)

Population (2002)
  - Total: 115

Martinja Vas pri Mokronogu (pronounced [maɾˈtiːnja ˈʋaːs pɾi mɔˈkɾoːnɔɡu]; Slovene: Martinja vas pri Mokronogu, German: Martinsdorf) is a village immediately north of Mokronog in the Municipality of Mokronog-Trebelno in southeastern Slovenia. The area is part of the historical region of Lower Carniola. The municipality is now included in the Southeast Slovenia Statistical Region.

== Name ==
The name of the settlement was changed from Martinja vas to Martinja vas pri Mokronogu in 1953. In the 19th century the German name was Martinsdorf.

== Church ==
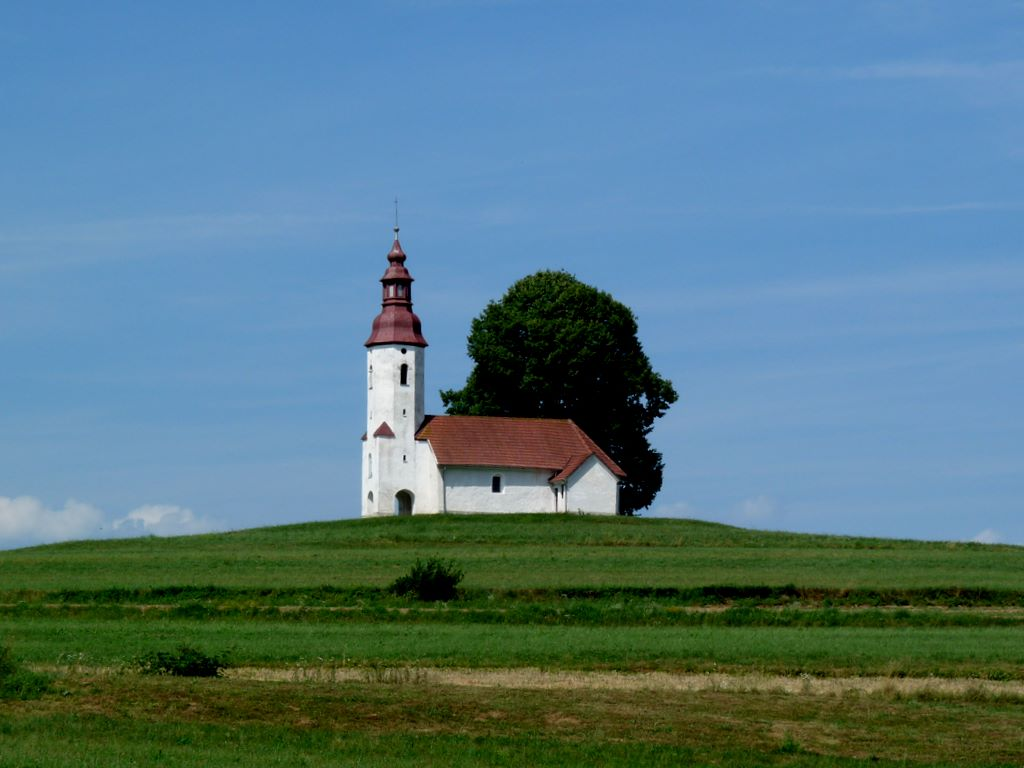
St. Nicholas's Church

The local church, built on a slight elevation east of the settlement, is dedicated to Saint Nicholas and belongs to the Parish of Mokronog. It was first mentioned in written documents dating to 1526 and was restyled in the Baroque in the 17th century. The main altar dates to 1877.
