= Češnjice pri Trebelnem =

- Location in Slovenia
- Coordinates: 45°53′46.83″N 15°8′25.18″E
- Country: Slovenia
- Traditional region: Lower Carniola
- Statistical region: Southeast Slovenia
- Municipality: Mokronog-Trebelno

Area
  - Total: 1.44 km^{2} (0.56 sq mi)
- Elevation: 424.6 m (1,393 ft)

Population (2002)
  - Total: 95

Češnjice pri Trebelnem (pronounced [ˈtʃéːʃnjitsɛ pɾi tɾɛˈbéːu̯nɛm]; German: Kerschdorf) is a small settlement south of Trebelno in the Municipality of Mokronog-Trebelno in southeastern Slovenia. The area is part of the historical region of Lower Carniola and is now included in the Southeast Slovenia Statistical Region.

== Name ==
The name of the settlement was changed from Češnjice to Češnjice pri Trebelnem in 1953. In the past, the German name was Kerschdorf.
