= Roje pri Trebelnem =

- Location in Slovenia
- Coordinates: 45°53′5.85″N 15°10′25.2″E
- Country: Slovenia
- Traditional region: Lower Carniola
- Statistical region: Southeast Slovenia
- Municipality: Mokronog-Trebelno

Area
  - Total: 6.9 km^{2} (2.7 sq mi)
- Elevation: 348.8 m (1,144 ft)

Population (2002)
  - Total: 58

Roje pri Trebelnem (pronounced [ˈɾoːjɛ pɾi tɾɛˈbéːu̯nɛm]) is a settlement in the hills south of Trebelno in the Municipality of Mokronog-Trebelno in southeastern Slovenia. It lies in the valley of Radulja Creek and its territory extends south to include most of the northern slopes of Radulja Hill. The area is part of the historical region of Lower Carniola. The municipality is now included in the Southeast Slovenia Statistical Region.

== Name ==
The name of the settlement was changed from Roje to Roje pri Trebelnem in 1953.
