= Čilpah =

- Location in Slovenia
- Coordinates: 45°53′54.65″N 15°7′49.47″E
- Country: Slovenia
- Traditional region: Lower Carniola
- Statistical region: Southeast Slovenia
- Municipality: Mokronog-Trebelno

Area
  - Total: 1.04 km^{2} (0.40 sq mi)
- Elevation: 433.9 m (1,424 ft)

Population (2002)
  - Total: 37

Čilpah (pronounced [ˈtʃiːlpax]; in older sources also Cilpah, locally Čilpoh) is a small settlement to the southwest of Trebelno in the Municipality of Mokronog-Trebelno in southeastern Slovenia. The area is part of the traditional region of Lower Carniola. The municipality is now included in the Southeast Slovenia Statistical Region.
