= Puščava =

Puščava (meaning "desert, a barren area of land") is a Slovene place name that may refer to:

- Puščava, Lovrenc na Pohorju, a village in the Municipality of Lovrenc na Pohorju, northeastern Slovenia
- Puščava, Mokronog-Trebelno, a village in the Municipality of Mokronog-Trebelno, southeastern Slovenia
