= Gorenje Laknice =

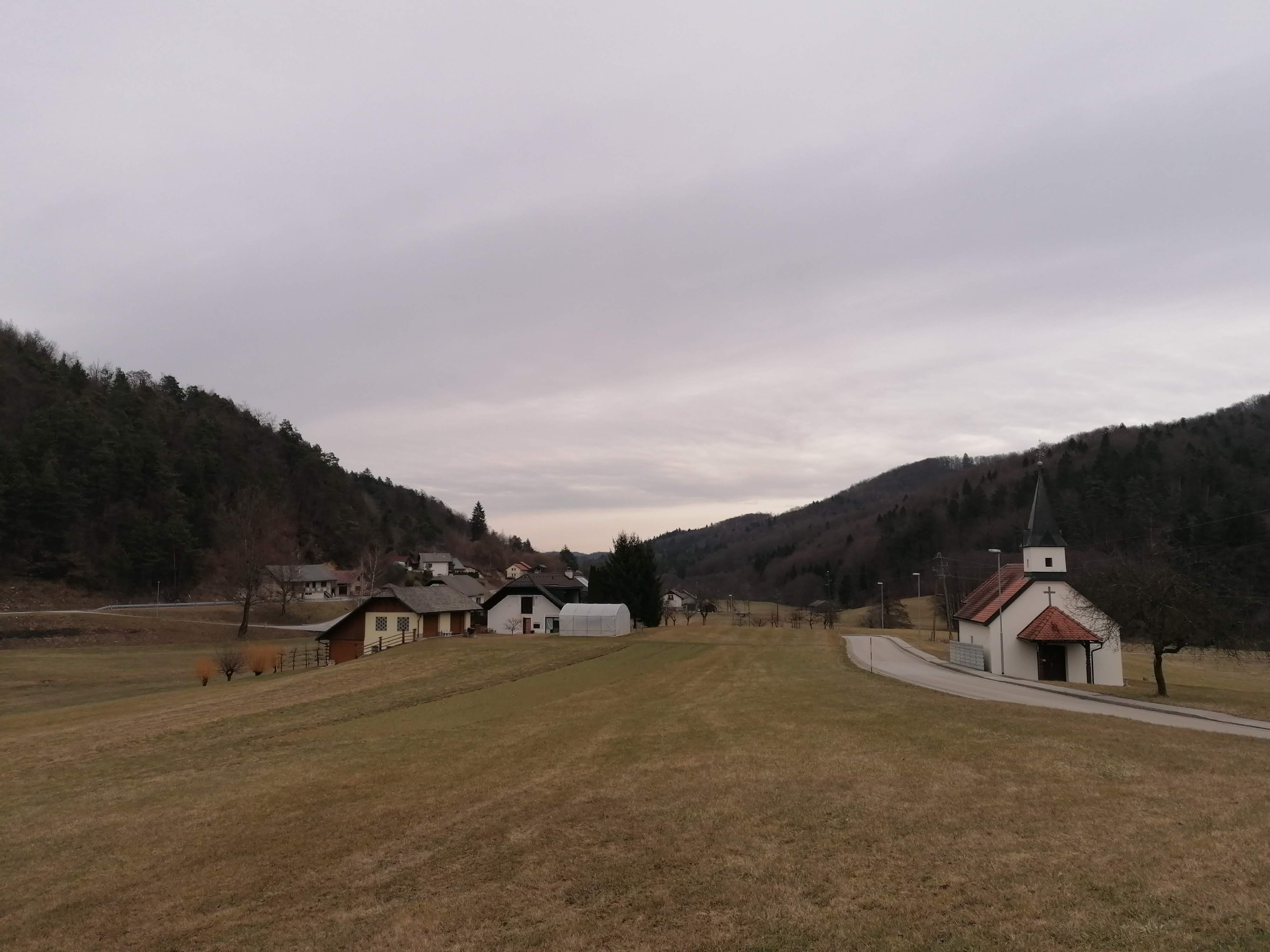

- Location in Slovenia
- Coordinates: 45°55′58.88″N 15°9′53.25″E
- Country: Slovenia
- Traditional region: Lower Carniola
- Statistical region: Southeast Slovenia
- Municipality: Mokronog-Trebelno

Area
  - Total: 1.89 km^{2} (0.73 sq mi)
- Elevation: 273.3 m (897 ft)

Population (2002)
  - Total: 69

Gorenje Laknice (pronounced [ɡɔˈɾeːnjɛ ˈlaːknitsɛ]; German: Oberlaknitz) is a settlement south of Mokronog in the Municipality of Mokronog-Trebelno in southeastern Slovenia. The area is part of the historical region of Lower Carniola. The municipality is now included in the Southeast Slovenia Statistical Region.

The local church in the settlement is dedicated to Saint Judoc (Slovene: sveti Jošt) and belongs to the Parish of Mokronog. It is an originally medieval building that was restyled in the Baroque in the mid-18th century.
