= Dolenje Zabukovje =

- Location in Slovenia
- Coordinates: 45°54′52.59″N 15°8′26.27″E
- Country: Slovenia
- Traditional region: Lower Carniola
- Statistical region: Southeast Slovenia
- Municipality: Mokronog-Trebelno

Area
  - Total: 1.4 km^{2} (0.54 sq mi)
- Elevation: 497.9 m (1,634 ft)

Population (2002)
  - Total: 25

Dolenje Zabukovje (pronounced [dɔˈleːnjɛ zaˈbuːkɔu̯jɛ]; German: Untersabukuje) is a small settlement in the hills south of Mokronog in the Municipality of Mokronog-Trebelno in southeastern Slovenia. The area is part of the historical region of Lower Carniola. The municipality is now included in the Southeast Slovenia Statistical Region.
