= Most, Mokronog-Trebelno =

Most
- Location in Slovenia
- Coordinates: 45°57′44.55″N 15°9′1.55″E
- Country: Slovenia
- Traditional region: Lower Carniola
- Statistical region: Southeast Slovenia
- Municipality: Mokronog-Trebelno

Area
  - Total: 0.81 km^{2} (0.31 sq mi)
- Elevation: 239.8 m (787 ft)

Population (2002)
  - Total: 38

Most (pronounced [ˈmoːst]) is a small settlement in the Municipality of Mokronog-Trebelno in southeastern Slovenia. It lies on the right bank of the Mirna River, just south of the village of Hrastovica. The area is part of the historical region of Lower Carniola. The municipality is now included in the Southeast Slovenia Statistical Region.
