= Slepšek =

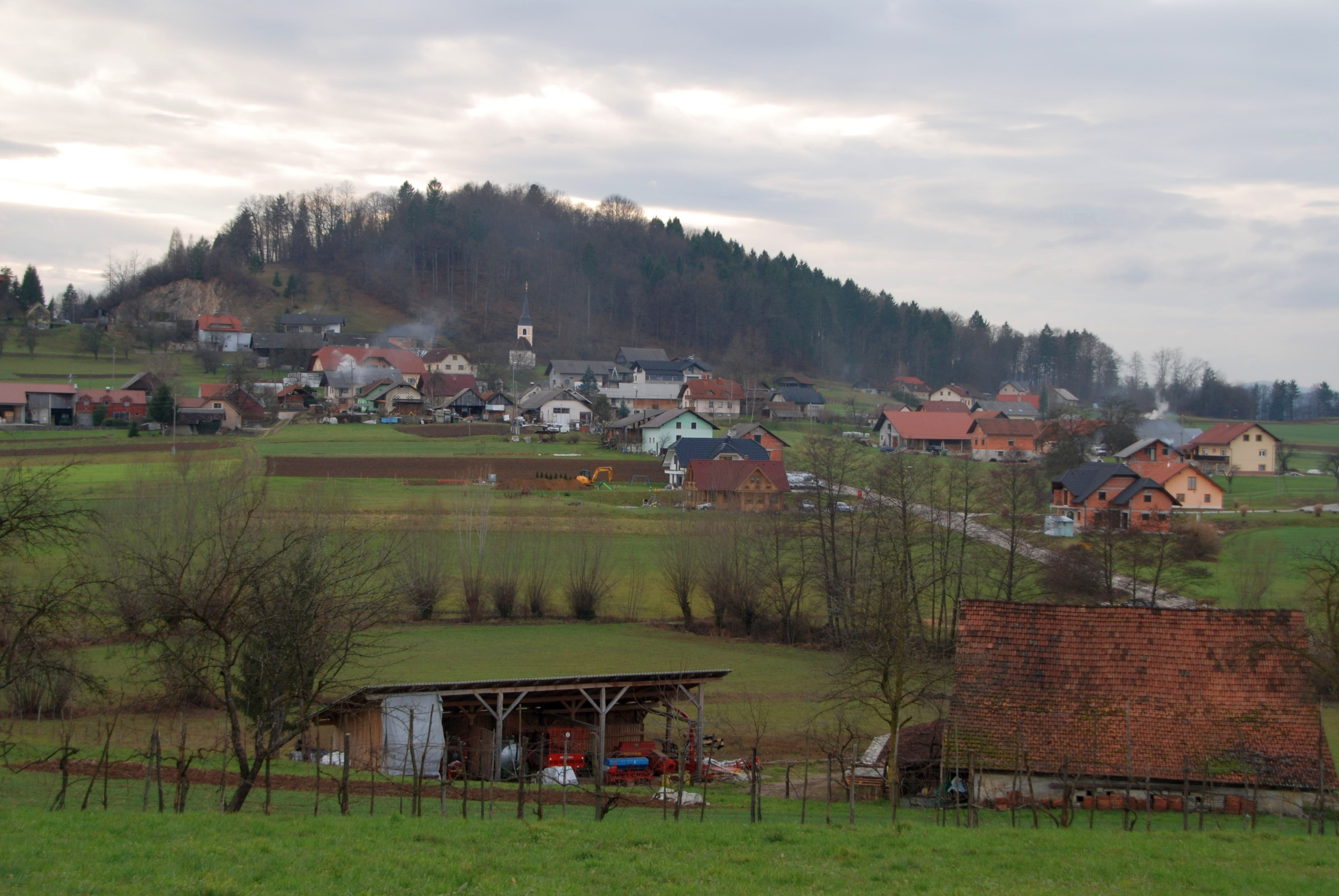

- Location in Slovenia
- Coordinates: 45°56′42.46″N 15°7′34.55″E
- Country: Slovenia
- Traditional region: Lower Carniola
- Statistical region: Southeast Slovenia
- Municipality: Mokronog-Trebelno

Area
  - Total: 0.78 km^{2} (0.30 sq mi)
- Elevation: 257.1 m (844 ft)

Population (2002)
  - Total: 109

Slepšek (pronounced [ˈsleːpʃək]) is a small settlement west of Mokronog in the Municipality of Mokronog-Trebelno in southeastern Slovenia. The area is part of the historical region of Lower Carniola. The municipality is now included in the Southeast Slovenia Statistical Region.

== Geography ==
Slepšek is located in the hills north of Mokronog, about 15 kilometers (9.3 mi) west of Novo Mesto at an elevation of 257 meters (843 ft).

== Church ==
The local church is dedicated to Martin of Tours and belongs to the Parish of Mokronog. It has a Romanesque nave with a 16th-century extension. The building was restyled in the Baroque in the mid-18th century.

== History ==
The area around Slepšek has been inhabited since prehistoric times, with archaeological evidence suggesting settlement during the Roman period. The village itself was first mentioned in written records in the 14th century.
