= Križni Vrh =

Križni Vrh (meaning "Cross Peak") is a Slovene place name that may refer to:

- Križni Vrh, Mokronog-Trebelno, a village in the Municipality of Mokronog–Trebelno, southeastern Slovenia
- Križni Vrh, Slovenska Bistrica, a village in the Municipality of Slovenska Bistrica, northeastern Slovenia
