= Jagodnik, Mokronog-Trebelno =

Jagodnik
- Location in Slovenia
- Coordinates: 45°52′26.47″N 15°9′34.44″E
- Country: Slovenia
- Traditional region: Lower Carniola
- Statistical region: Southeast Slovenia
- Municipality: Mokronog-Trebelno

Area
  - Total: 0.61 km^{2} (0.24 sq mi)
- Elevation: 510.4 m (1,675 ft)

Population (2002)
  - Total: 29

Jagodnik (pronounced [ˈjaːɡɔdnik]) is a small settlement in the Municipality of Mokronog-Trebelno in southeastern Slovenia. The municipality lies in the historical region of Lower Carniola and is now included in the Southeast Slovenia Statistical Region.

== History ==
Jagodnik was a hamlet of Podturn until 2000, when it was administratively separated and made a settlement in its own right.
