= Heiligenkreuz =

Heiligenkreuz, which means 'Holy Cross' in German, may refer to:

In Austria:

- Heiligenkreuz, Lower Austria, a municipality in Lower Austria
  - Heiligenkreuz Abbey in this municipality
- Heiligenkreuz im Lafnitztal, a municipality in Burgenland
- Heiligenkreuz am Waasen, a municipality in Styria

In the Czech Republic:

- Chodský Újezd, a municipality in the Czech Republic

In Slovakia:

- Žiar nad Hronom, a town in Slovakia

In Slovenia:

- Beli Grič, a settlement in the Municipality of Mokronog–Trebelno, formerly known as Heiligenkreuz
- Podbočje, a settlement in the Municipality of Krško, formerly known as Heiligenkreuz
