= Vrh pri Trebelnem =

- Location in Slovenia
- Coordinates: 45°54′26.07″N 15°7′49.09″E
- Country: Slovenia
- Traditional region: Lower Carniola
- Statistical region: Southeast Slovenia
- Municipality: Mokronog-Trebelno

Area
  - Total: 0.85 km^{2} (0.33 sq mi)
- Elevation: 529.8 m (1,738 ft)

Population (2002)
  - Total: 27

Vrh pri Trebelnem (pronounced [ˈʋəɾx pɾi tɾɛˈbéːu̯nɛm]) is a small dispersed settlement in the hills west of Trebelno in the Municipality of Mokronog-Trebelno in southeastern Slovenia. The area is part of the historical region of Lower Carniola. The municipality is now included in the Southeast Slovenia Statistical Region.

== Name ==
The name of the settlement was changed from Vrh to Vrh pri Trebelnem in 1953.
