= Maline, Mokronog-Trebelno =

Maline
- Location in Slovenia
- Coordinates: 45°54′33.06″N 15°9′36.76″E
- Country: Slovenia
- Traditional region: Lower Carniola
- Statistical region: Southeast Slovenia
- Municipality: Mokronog-Trebelno

Area
  - Total: 1.79 km^{2} (0.69 sq mi)
- Elevation: 480.2 m (1,575 ft)

Population (2002)
  - Total: 25

Maline (pronounced [ˈmaːlinɛ]) is a small settlement just east of Trebelno in the Municipality of Mokronog-Trebelno in southeastern Slovenia. The area is part of the historical region of Lower Carniola. The municipality is now included in the Southeast Slovenia Statistical Region.
