= Gorenja Vas pri Mokronogu =

- Location in Slovenia
- Coordinates: 45°56′14.62″N 15°7′20.56″E
- Country: Slovenia
- Traditional region: Lower Carniola
- Statistical region: Southeast Slovenia
- Municipality: Mokronog-Trebelno

Area
  - Total: 1.52 km^{2} (0.59 sq mi)
- Elevation: 250.3 m (821 ft)

Population (2002)
  - Total: 16

Gorenja Vas pri Mokronogu (pronounced [ɡɔˈɾeːnja ˈʋaːs pɾi mɔˈkɾoːnɔɡu]; Slovene: Gorenja vas pri Mokronogu, German: Oberdorf) is a small settlement just west of Mokronog in the Municipality of Mokronog-Trebelno in southeastern Slovenia. The municipality is included in the Southeast Slovenia Statistical Region and is part of the traditional region of Lower Carniola.

== Name ==
The name of the settlement was changed from Gorenja vas to Gorenja vas pri Mokronogu in 1953.
