= Cerovec pri Trebelnem =

- Location in Slovenia
- Coordinates: 45°53′20.36″N 15°7′9.5″E
- Country: Slovenia
- Traditional region: Lower Carniola
- Statistical region: Southeast Slovenia
- Municipality: Mokronog-Trebelno

Area
  - Total: 1.16 km^{2} (0.45 sq mi)
- Elevation: 374.9 m (1,230 ft)

Population (2002)
  - Total: 63

Cerovec pri Trebelnem (pronounced [tsɛˈɾɔːʋəts pɾi tɾɛˈbéːu̯nɛm, -ˈɾoː-]) is a small village in the Municipality of Mokronog-Trebelno in southeastern Slovenia. The area is part of the historical region of Lower Carniola. The municipality is now included in the Southeast Slovenia Statistical Region.

== Name ==
The name of the settlement was changed from Cerovec to Cerovec pri Trebelnem in 1953.

== Church ==
The local church in the settlement is dedicated to Saint Ulrich (Slovene: Sveti Urh) and belongs to the Parish of Trebelno. It was first mentioned in written documents dating to 1526 and was rebuilt in the second half of the 18th century.
