= Gorenje Zabukovje =

- Location in Slovenia
- Coordinates: 45°54′43.6″N 15°7′18.96″E
- Country: Slovenia
- Traditional region: Lower Carniola
- Statistical region: Southeast Slovenia
- Municipality: Mokronog-Trebelno

Area
  - Total: 1.6 km^{2} (0.62 sq mi)
- Elevation: 502.7 m (1,649 ft)

Population (2002)
  - Total: 29

Gorenje Zabukovje (pronounced [ɡɔˈɾeːnjɛ zaˈbuːkɔu̯jɛ]; German: Obersabukuje) is a small settlement in the Municipality of Mokronog-Trebelno in southeastern Slovenia. It lies in the hills west of Trebelno in the historical region of Lower Carniola. The municipality is now included in the Southeast Slovenia Statistical Region.
