= Štatenberk =

- Location in Slovenia
- Coordinates: 45°53′5.97″N 15°9′3.11″E
- Country: Slovenia
- Traditional region: Lower Carniola
- Statistical region: Southeast Slovenia
- Municipality: Mokronog-Trebelno

Area
  - Total: 1.72 km^{2} (0.66 sq mi)
- Elevation: 359.2 m (1,178 ft)

Population (2002)
  - Total: 50

Štatenberk (pronounced [ˈʃtaːtəmbɛɾk]; in older sources also Statenberg) is a settlement in the Municipality of Mokronog-Trebelno in southeastern Slovenia. The area is part of the historical region of Lower Carniola. The municipality is now included in the Southeast Slovenia Statistical Region.

== Name ==
Štatenberk was attested in historical sources as Stettenberg and Stettenburch in 1250, Staͤtenburch in 1324, and Staetenbürkch in 1387, among other spellings. After the Second World War, there was an initiative by the new communist government to replace many place names of obvious German origin (cf. Branik, Brestanica, Ravne na Koroškem, etc.). A proposal was made for Štatenberk to be renamed Osvobojena vas (literally, 'liberated village'), but it was not carried through.

== Church ==
The local church is dedicated to Martin of Tours and belongs to the Parish of Trebelno. It has a Romanesque nave with a 15th-century extension. The building was restyled in the Baroque in the 18th century.
