= Pugled pri Starem Logu =

- Location in Slovenia
- Coordinates: 45°42′6.16″N 14°55′44.24″E
- Country: Slovenia
- Traditional region: Lower Carniola
- Statistical region: Southeast Slovenia
- Municipality: Kočevje
- Elevation: 645 m (2,116 ft)

Population (2002)
  - Total: 0

Pugled pri Starem Logu (pronounced [ˈpuːɡlɛt pɾi ˈstaːɾɛm ˈloːɡu]; also formerly Pogled or Puglarje, German: Hohenberg, Gottscheerish: Hoachnparg) is an abandoned settlement in the hills north of the town of Kočevje in southern Slovenia. The area is part of the traditional region of Lower Carniola and is now included in the Southeast Slovenia Statistical Region.

== Name ==
The dialect-based Slovene name Pugled and the standard form Pogled are common toponyms in Slovenia (e.g., Pugled, Pugled pri Mokronogu, Pogled). The name is derived from the Slovene word pogled 'bare hill with an open view' and referred to a landscape feature. The name of the settlement was changed from Pugled to Pugled pri Starem Logu in 1953. The semantically related German name Hohenberg and Gottscheerish name Hoachnparg both mean 'high mountain'.

== History ==
Pugled pri Starem Logu was founded in a clearing in the 14th century by Gottschee Germans. In the land registry of 1574, the village consisted of two full farms divided into four half-farms, corresponding to a population between 13 and 17. The village had 12 houses in 1770. Before the Second World War the village had 16 houses and 72 residents. A windmill stood in the village. Its original population was evicted in November 1941. Italian forces burned the village during the Rog Offensive in late August 1942. During the war, the Partisans set up various facilities in the area: several bases (Baza Pugled, Baza I, Baza 14) stood outside the village and the underground Urška printshop operated near the village. The political leadership of the Liberation Front located itself nearby on 12 June 1942. In March 1943 the Partisans built a hospital southeast of Pugled, which was destroyed by German forces in October 1943. A meeting of Liberation Front activists was held in Pugled from 28 to 30 April 1943, where they confirmed the principles of the Dolomite Declaration. Today the village is abandoned and little remains of the houses and farm buildings. The foundations are mostly overgrown by trees and shrubs. The site of the former village is registered as cultural heritage. The village well is preserved, near which the poet Miran Jarc was killed on 24 August 1942. A small cross has been erected at the place where he was killed.

== Church ==
A church dedicated to Saints Peter and Paul stood to the west above the village. The church was built in the 17th century and the nave had a coffered wooden ceiling. The main altar was reworked in the 19th century, and there was a 17th-century altar with a wooden painting. The church was burned in August 1942.

== Other cultural heritage ==
- A monument was unveiled in 1951 to commemorate the 1943 meeting and confirmation of the Dolomite Declaration in Pugled. It stands along a footpath in a clearing in the forest south of Pugled Hill and consists of several stone blocks with a supporting column and an inscribed plaque.
- A memorial column was erected in 1959 to commemorate the wartime Partisan hospital at Pugled.
- A plaque was set up in 1982 along the road through the former village to commemorate the founding of the Partisan Tone Tomšič Brigade on 16 July 1942.
