= Dolenje Laknice =

- Location in Slovenia
- Coordinates: 45°55′46.63″N 15°12′30.12″E
- Country: Slovenia
- Traditional region: Lower Carniola
- Statistical region: Southeast Slovenia
- Municipality: Mokronog-Trebelno

Area
  - Total: 2.23 km^{2} (0.86 sq mi)
- Elevation: 232.5 m (763 ft)

Population (2002)
  - Total: 61

Dolenje Laknice (pronounced [dɔˈleːnjɛ ˈlaːknitsɛ]; German: Unterlaknitz) is a settlement in the Municipality of Mokronog-Trebelno in southeastern Slovenia. The area is part of the historical region of Lower Carniola. The municipality is now included in the Southeast Slovenia Statistical Region.

The ruins of Čretež Castle, a castle first mentioned in written documents dating to the 14th century, but evidently dating to at least the 13th century, destroyed by fire in 1770, can be found on a hill above the settlement.
