= Drečji Vrh =

- Location in Slovenia
- Coordinates: 45°54′55.66″N 15°10′26.01″E
- Country: Slovenia
- Traditional region: Lower Carniola
- Statistical region: Southeast Slovenia
- Municipality: Mokronog-Trebelno

Area
  - Total: 4.77 km^{2} (1.84 sq mi)
- Elevation: 468.6 m (1,537 ft)

Population (2002)
  - Total: 74

Drečji Vrh (pronounced [ˈdɾeːtʃji ˈʋəɾx]; in older sources also Derečji Vrh) is a small settlement in the Municipality of Mokronog-Trebelno in southeastern Slovenia. The area is part of the historical region of Lower Carniola. The municipality is now included in the Southeast Slovenia Statistical Region.

A number of Early Iron Age burial mounds have been identified around the settlement.
