= Jelševec, Mokronog-Trebelno =

Jelševec
- Location in Slovenia
- Coordinates: 45°54′1.81″N 15°11′18.27″E
- Country: Slovenia
- Traditional region: Lower Carniola
- Statistical region: Southeast Slovenia
- Municipality: Mokronog-Trebelno

Area
  - Total: 2.25 km^{2} (0.87 sq mi)
- Elevation: 442.2 m (1,451 ft)

Population (2002)
  - Total: 46

Jelševec (pronounced [ˈjɛːu̯ʃɛʋəts]; German: Jeuscheuz) is a village in the hills east of Trebelno in the Municipality of Mokronog-Trebelno in southeastern Slovenia. It lies in the historical region of Lower Carniola. The municipality is now included in the Southeast Slovenia Statistical Region.

The local church, built above the hamlet of Blečji Vrh in the settlement, is dedicated to Saint Anthony of Padua and belongs to the Parish of Trebelno. It is an older church that was thoroughly rebuilt and restyled in the Baroque in the late 18th century.
