= Velika Strmica =

- Location in Slovenia
- Coordinates: 45°53′51.94″N 15°12′43.14″E
- Country: Slovenia
- Traditional region: Lower Carniola
- Statistical region: Southeast Slovenia
- Municipality: Mokronog-Trebelno

Area
  - Total: 1.47 km^{2} (0.57 sq mi)
- Elevation: 404 m (1,325 ft)

Population (2002)
  - Total: 46

Velika Strmica (pronounced [ˈʋeːlika ˈstəɾmitsa]) is a small settlement in the Municipality of Mokronog-Trebelno in southeastern Slovenia. The area is part of the historical region of Lower Carniola. The municipality is now included in the Southeast Slovenia Statistical Region.

A hill fort dating to Late Antiquity has been identified near the settlement. It was built in a strategic position above the important Roman road from Emona to Siscia.
