= Hrastovica, Mokronog-Trebelno =

Hrastovica
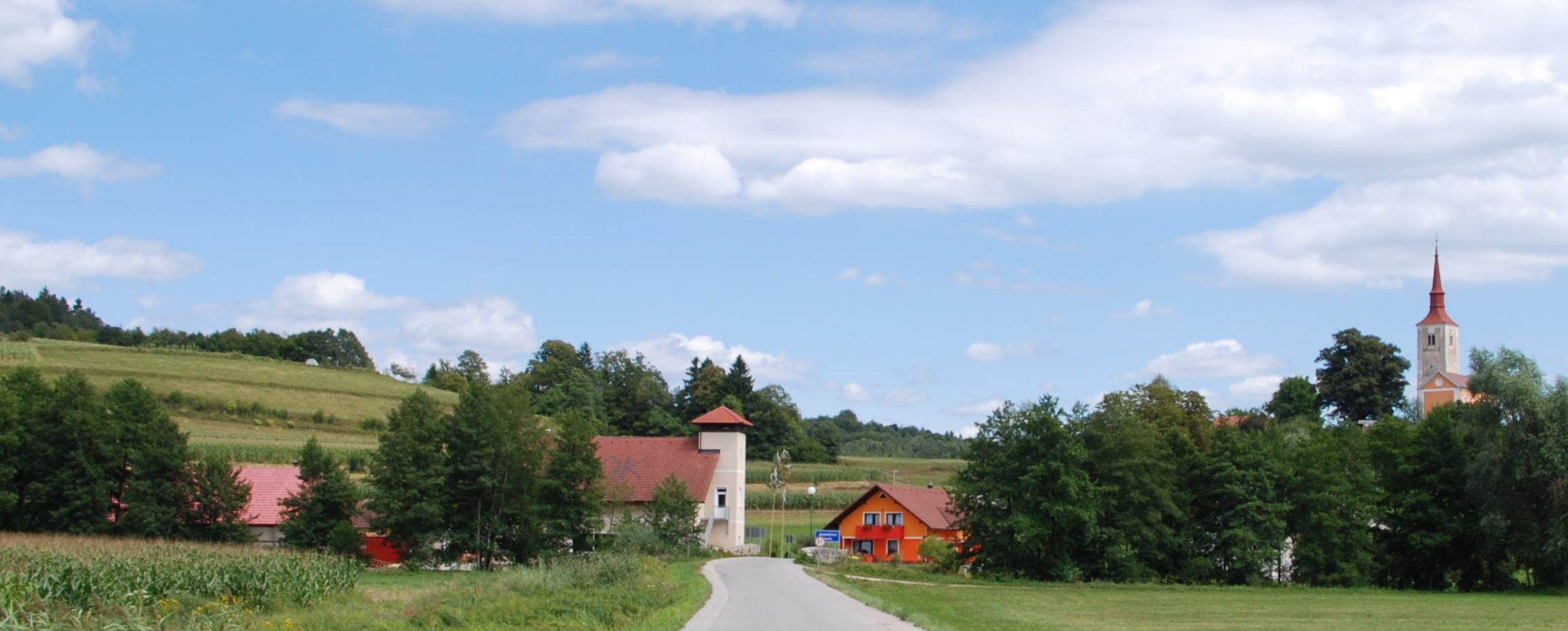
- Hrastovica from the west

- Location in Slovenia
- Coordinates: 45°57′59.12″N 15°9′2.05″E
- Country: Slovenia
- Traditional region: Lower Carniola
- Statistical region: Southeast Slovenia
- Municipality: Mokronog-Trebelno

Area
  - Total: 1.33 km^{2} (0.51 sq mi)
- Elevation: 252.6 m (829 ft)

Population (2002)
  - Total: 113

Hrastovica (pronounced [ˈxɾaːstɔʋitsa]) is a village north of Mokronog in the Municipality of Mokronog-Trebelno in southeastern Slovenia. It lies in the historical region of Lower Carniola. The municipality is now included in the Southeast Slovenia Statistical Region.

== Landmarks ==
The local church in the settlement is dedicated to Saint Roch and belongs to the Parish of Mokronog. It was built in 1661. A single-arch stone bridge, built in the 19th century, leads across Jeseniščica Creek west of the church. Zagorica Manor from the end of the 17th century or the beginning of the 18th century stands northeast of the church.
