= Municipality of Mokronog-Trebelno =

Municipality of Slovenia

Municipality of Mokronog–Trebelno Občina Mokronog - Trebelno
- Municipality
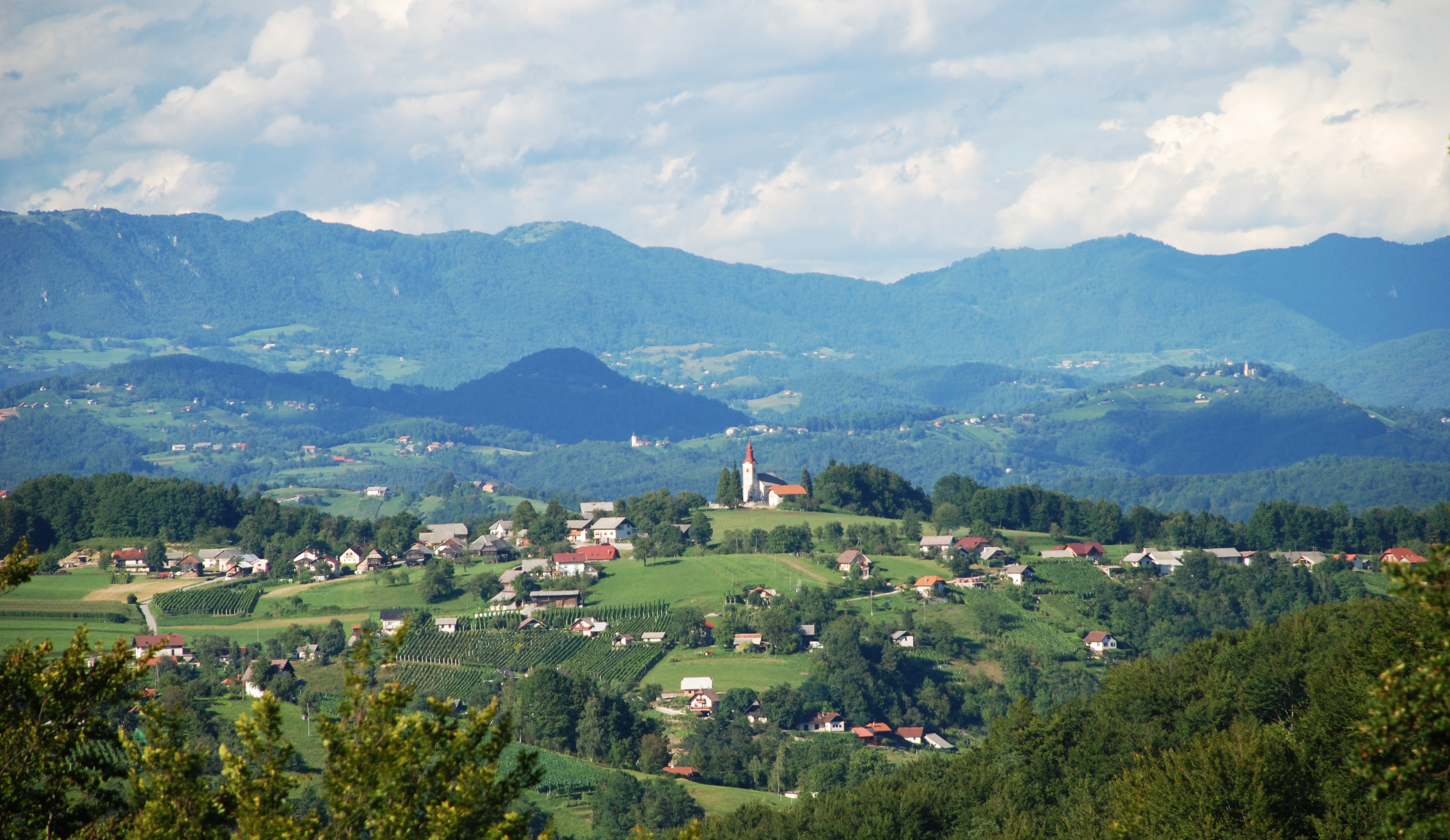
- The village of Sveti Vrh in the Municipality of Mokronog-Trebelno

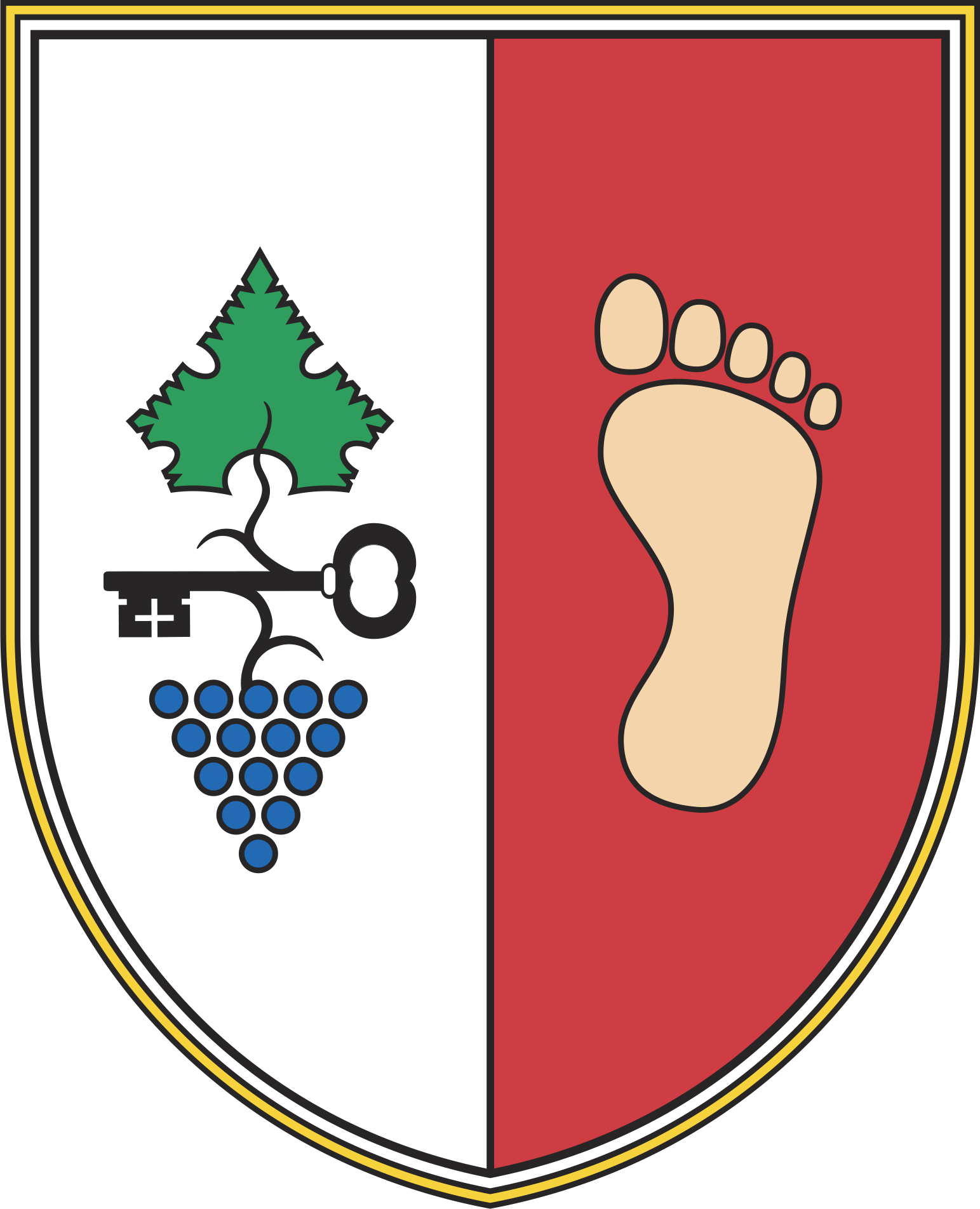
- Coat of arms

- Location of the Municipality of Mokronog–Trebelno in Slovenia
- Coordinates: 45°56′N 15°08′E
- Country: Slovenia

Government
  - Mayor: Franc Glušič (Independent)

Area
  - Total: 71 km^{2} (27 sq mi)

Population (2018)
  - Total: 3,033
  - Density: 43/km^{2} (110/sq mi)
- Time zone: UTC+01 (CET)
  - Summer (DST): UTC+02 (CEST)
- Website: www.mokronog-trebelno.si

The Municipality of Mokronog–Trebelno (pronounced [mɔˈkɾòːnɔk tɾɛˈbéːwnɔ]; Slovene: Občina Mokronog - Trebelno) is a municipality in Slovenia. The municipality was created in 2006, when it seceded from the Municipality of Trebnje. It is part of the traditional province of Lower Carniola. The municipality is now included in the Southeast Slovenia Statistical Region. Its seat is the settlement of Mokronog, and it is also named after the settlement of Trebelno.

== Settlements ==
In addition to the municipal seat of Mokronog, the municipality also includes the following settlements:

- Beli Grič
- Bitnja Vas
- Bogneča Vas
- Brezje pri Trebelnem
- Brezovica pri Trebelnem
- Bruna Vas
- Cerovec pri Trebelnem
- Češnjice pri Trebelnem
- Cikava
- Čilpah
- Čužnja Vas
- Dolenje Laknice
- Dolenje Zabukovje
- Drečji Vrh
- Gorenja Vas pri Mokronogu
- Gorenje Laknice
- Gorenje Zabukovje
- Gorenji Mokronog
- Hrastovica
- Jagodnik
- Jelševec
- Križni Vrh
- Log
- Maline
- Martinja Vas pri Mokronogu
- Mirna Vas
- Most
- Ornuška Vas
- Ostrožnik
- Podturn
- Pugled pri Mokronogu
- Puščava
- Radna Vas
- Ribjek
- Roje pri Trebelnem
- Slepšek
- Srednje Laknice
- Štatenberk
- Sveti Vrh
- Trebelno
- Velika Strmica
- Vrh pri Trebelnem

== History ==
Tombs dating to the Early Iron Age have been discovered on a number of sites in the municipality.

== Notable people ==
Notable people that were born or lived in the area of the Municipality of Mokronog–Trebelno include:

- Franc Serafin Metelko (1779–1860), philologist
- Martin Strel (born 1954), long distance swimmer
