= Cikava, Mokronog-Trebelno =

Cikava
- Location in Slovenia
- Coordinates: 45°53′40.83″N 15°10′30.88″E
- Country: Slovenia
- Traditional region: Lower Carniola
- Statistical region: Southeast Slovenia
- Municipality: Mokronog-Trebelno

Area
  - Total: 1.09 km^{2} (0.42 sq mi)
- Elevation: 395.5 m (1,298 ft)

Population (2002)
  - Total: 29

Cikava (pronounced [tsiˈkaːʋa]) is a small settlement in the Municipality of Mokronog-Trebelno in southeastern Slovenia. The municipality is now included in the Southeast Slovenia Statistical Region. Historically the area was part of Lower Carniola.
