= Brezje pri Trebelnem =

- Location in Slovenia
- Coordinates: 45°52′55.06″N 15°7′44.7″E
- Country: Slovenia
- Traditional region: Lower Carniola
- Statistical region: Southeast Slovenia
- Municipality: Mokronog-Trebelno

Area
  - Total: 1.07 km^{2} (0.41 sq mi)
- Elevation: 377.3 m (1,238 ft)

Population (2002)
  - Total: 32

Brezje pri Trebelnem (pronounced [ˈbɾéːzjɛ pɾi tɾɛˈbéːu̯nɛm]) is a small settlement in the Municipality of Mokronog-Trebelno in southeastern Slovenia. The area is part of the historical region of Lower Carniola. The municipality is now included in the Southeast Slovenia Statistical Region.

== Name ==
Brezje pri Trebelnem was attested in written sources as Pirkenfeld in 1365, Pirchk in 1385, Chlain Wresawsikchz in 1406, Klain Pirikch in 1433, and Bresawicz in 1472, among other spellings. The name of the settlement was changed from Brezje to Brezje pri Trebelnem in 1953.

== Cultural heritage ==
A Late Bronze Age settlement with an associated burial ground with 31 burial mounds has been identified near the settlement.
