= Ornuška Vas =

- Location in Slovenia
- Coordinates: 45°53′27.12″N 15°7′44.31″E
- Country: Slovenia
- Traditional region: Lower Carniola
- Statistical region: Southeast Slovenia
- Municipality: Mokronog-Trebelno

Area
  - Total: 1.02 km^{2} (0.39 sq mi)
- Elevation: 364.5 m (1,196 ft)

Population (2002)
  - Total: 47

Ornuška Vas (pronounced [ɔɾˈnuːʃka ˈʋaːs]; Slovene: Ornuška vas, German: Ornuschkawas) is a small settlement in the Municipality of Mokronog-Trebelno in southeastern Slovenia. The area is part of the historical region of Lower Carniola. The municipality is now included in the Southeast Slovenia Statistical Region. It includes the hamlet of Udna Vas.

A small chapel-shrine in the southern part of the village was built in 1889.
