= Mirna Vas =

- Location in Slovenia
- Coordinates: 45°53′35.86″N 15°11′36.28″E
- Country: Slovenia
- Traditional region: Lower Carniola
- Statistical region: Southeast Slovenia
- Municipality: Mokronog-Trebelno

Area
  - Total: 2.4 km^{2} (0.93 sq mi)
- Elevation: 429 m (1,407 ft)

Population (2002)
  - Total: 48

Mirna Vas (pronounced [ˈmiːɾna ˈʋaːs]; Slovene: Mirna vas) is a small village in the Municipality of Mokronog-Trebelno in southeastern Slovenia. The area is part of the historical region of Lower Carniola and is now included in the Southeast Slovenia Statistical Region. The village includes the hamlets of Mirna Dolina (Slovene: Mirna dolina, German: Friedenthal), Lipovec, and Vinjvršč.
