= Miran Jarc =

Slovenian writer (1900–1942)

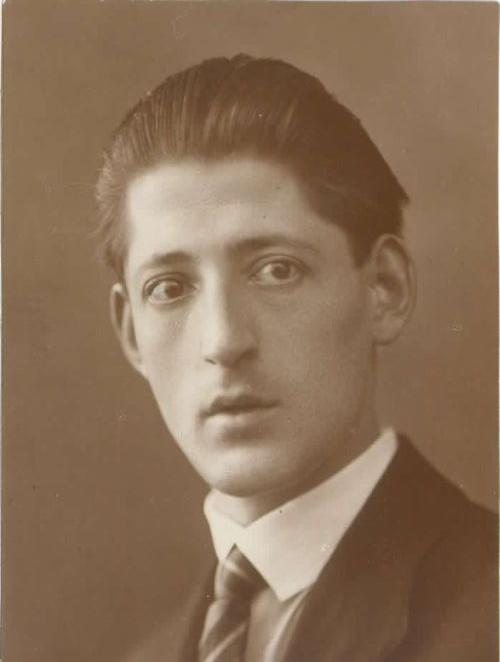
- Born: 5 July 1900; Črnomelj, Austria-Hungary (now Slovenia)
- Died: 24 August 1942 (aged 42); Pugled pri Starem Logu, Kočevski Rog
- Occupations: Writer; poet; playwright
- Writing career
- Notable works: Človek in noč, Novembrske pesmi, Lirika, Novo mesto

Miran Jarc (5 July 1900 – 24 August 1942) was a Slovene writer, poet, playwright and essayist.

Jarc was born in the town of Črnomelj in White Carniola, in what was then Austria-Hungary in 1900. He was sent to school in Novo Mesto, and between 1918 and 1922 studied Slavic philology in Zagreb and Ljubljana, though he never completed his studies. From 1923, he worked as a bank clerk in Ljubljana. He started writing while still a student and published his first poem in the journal Ljubljanski zvon in 1918. In the 1930s, he also worked as an actor and violinist in the Slovenian Puppet Theater in Ljubljana.

In 1942, during World War II, he was arrested by the occupying Fascist Italian authorities and sent to the internment camp at Gonars, but the train transporting the prisoners was attacked by Partisans near Verd and the detainees freed and given the choice to join the Partisans or return home (those that chose to return home were separated from the rest and murdered at the Krim Cave Mass Grave). Jarc chose to join the Partisans and was killed by the Italian Army two months later in Pugled pri Starem Logu in Kočevski Rog. By other accounts he was killed by the Partisans after a quarrel with members of the Communist party. He is buried in the cemetery in Stari Log.

The public library in Novo Mesto, as well as primary schools in Črnomelj and Ljubljana are named after Jarc.

== Personality and work ==
Jarc started his literary career in the late 1910s in Novo Mesto, which emerged at the time as an important literary center. As a young student, he joined the literary-artistic circle around the painter Božidar Jakac and poet Anton Podbevšek. Together, they organized a cultural-artistic manifestation, known as the Novo Mesto Spring. During this period, Jarc became interested in anthroposophy and developed an interest in Buddhism. However, he later grew closer to Christianity, remaining a member of the Roman Catholic Church.

In the 1920s, Jarc emerged as one of the most prominent expressionist poets in Slovenia. Recurrent themes in his poetry were the search of an exit from a sinking civilization. To the crisis of European civilization and the mechanization of man, he juxtaposed to an ecstatic and lyrical personal reflection. In the 1930s, he grew closer to Social Realism.

One of his most important works is the autobiographical novel Novo mesto (1932), in which he described the intellectual and artistic turmoil in the small Lower Carniolan town in the first years after World War I.

== Selected works ==
- Človek in noč, "Man and the Night", poems (1927)
- Novembrske pesmi, "November Poems", poems (1936)
- Lirika, "Lyrics", poems, (1940)
- Novo mesto, autobiographical novel (1932)
