= Križni Vrh, Mokronog-Trebelno =

Križni Vrh
- Location in Slovenia
- Coordinates: 45°55′52.91″N 15°7′23.3″E
- Country: Slovenia
- Traditional region: Lower Carniola
- Statistical region: Southeast Slovenia
- Municipality: Mokronog-Trebelno

Area
  - Total: 0.63 km^{2} (0.24 sq mi)
- Elevation: 268.5 m (881 ft)

Population (2002)
  - Total: 9

Križni Vrh (pronounced [ˈkɾiːʒni ˈʋəɾx]; German: Kreuzberg) is a small settlement southwest of Mokronog in the Municipality of Mokronog-Trebelno in southeastern Slovenia. The municipality is included in the Southeast Slovenia Statistical Region and is part of the historical region of Lower Carniola.
