= Bogneča Vas =

- Location in Slovenia
- Coordinates: 45°53′42.52″N 15°9′44.96″E
- Country: Slovenia
- Traditional region: Lower Carniola
- Statistical region: Southeast Slovenia
- Municipality: Mokronog-Trebelno

Area
  - Total: 1.84 km^{2} (0.71 sq mi)
- Elevation: 441.5 m (1,448 ft)

Population (2002)
  - Total: 76

Bogneča Vas (pronounced [bɔˈɡneːtʃa ˈʋaːs]; Slovene: Bogneča vas) is a village in the Municipality of Mokronog-Trebelno in southeastern Slovenia. The area is part of the traditional region of Lower Carniola. The municipality is now included in the Southeast Slovenia Statistical Region.

== Name ==
Bogneča Vas was attested in written sources as Pogendorff in 1395/96 and Pogendorf in 1436.
