= Log, Mokronog-Trebelno =

Log
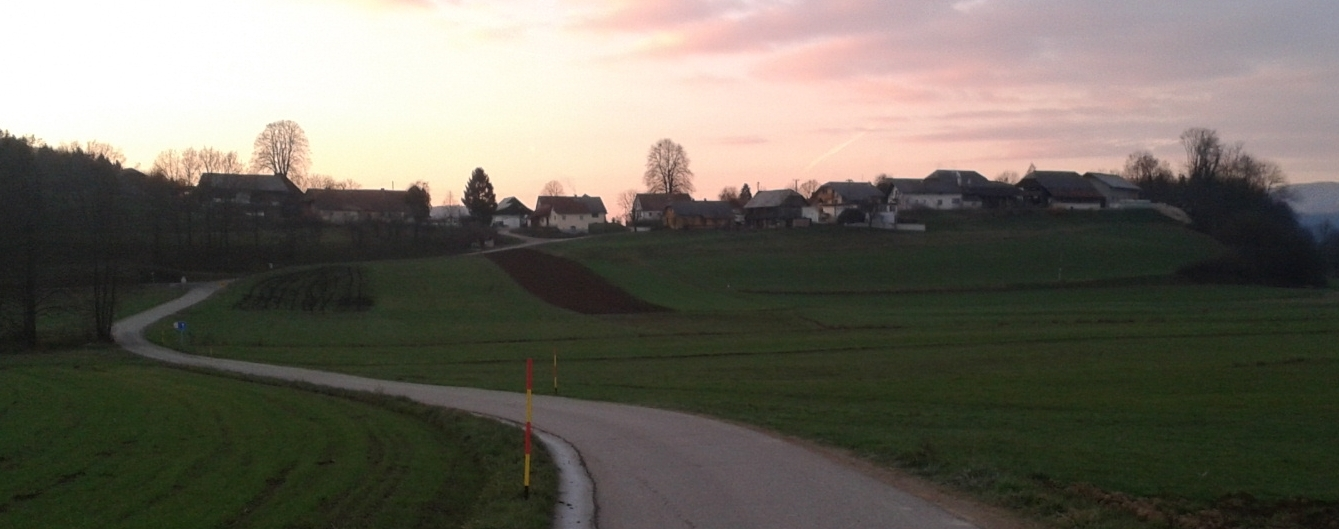

- Location in Slovenia
- Coordinates: 45°56′39.94″N 15°6′29.08″E
- Country: Slovenia
- Traditional region: Lower Carniola
- Statistical region: Southeast Slovenia
- Municipality: Mokronog-Trebelno

Area
  - Total: 0.98 km^{2} (0.38 sq mi)
- Elevation: 253.1 m (830 ft)

Population (2002)
  - Total: 33

Log (pronounced [ˈloːk]) is a small village in the Municipality of Mokronog-Trebelno in southeastern Slovenia. It lies on the right bank of the Mirna River west of Mokronog in the historical region of Lower Carniola. The municipality is now included in the Southeast Slovenia Statistical Region.
