= Puščava, Mokronog-Trebelno =

Puščava
- Location in Slovenia
- Coordinates: 45°57′23.62″N 15°7′17.93″E
- Country: Slovenia
- Traditional region: Lower Carniola
- Statistical region: Southeast Slovenia
- Municipality: Mokronog-Trebelno

Area
  - Total: 1.04 km^{2} (0.40 sq mi)
- Elevation: 236.6 m (776 ft)

Population (2002)
  - Total: 123

Puščava (pronounced [puˈʃtʃaːʋa]) is a small settlement in the Municipality of Mokronog-Trebelno in southeastern Slovenia. It lies on the left bank of the Mirna River northwest of Mokronog. The area is part of the historical region of Lower Carniola. The municipality is now included in the Southeast Slovenia Statistical Region.
