= Pugled pri Karlovici =

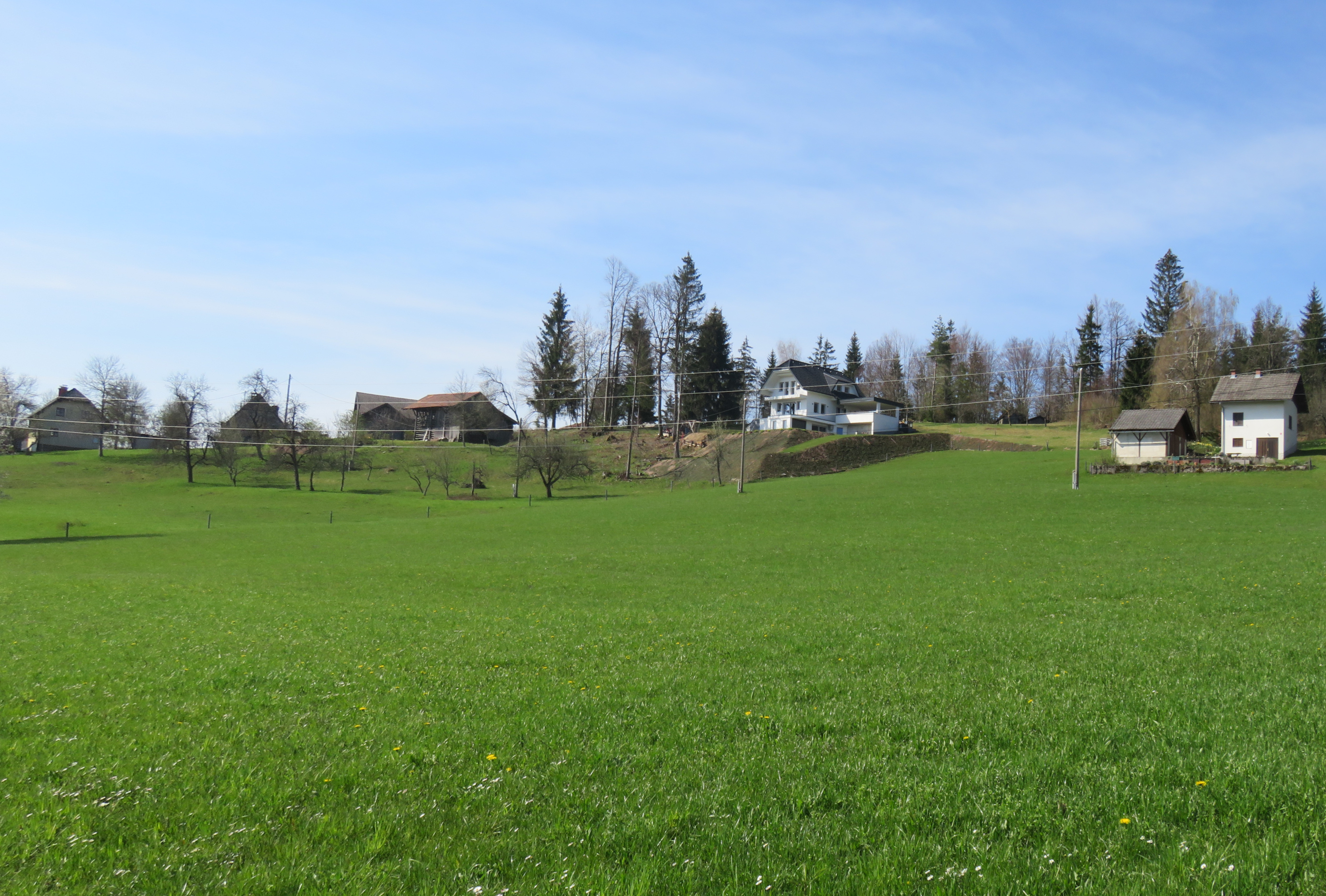

- Location in Slovenia
- Coordinates: 45°47′26.37″N 14°36′17.95″E
- Country: Slovenia
- Traditional region: Lower Carniola
- Statistical region: Southeast Slovenia
- Municipality: Ribnica

Area
  - Total: 0.94 km^{2} (0.36 sq mi)
- Elevation: 729.8 m (2,394 ft)

Population (2002)
  - Total: 3
- Postal code: 1315

Pugled pri Karlovici (pronounced [ˈpuːɡlɛt pɾi ˈkaːɾlɔʋitsi]) is a small settlement in the Municipality of Ribnica in southern Slovenia. It lies in the traditional region of Lower Carniola and is now included in the Southeast Slovenia Statistical Region.

== Name ==
The name of the settlement was changed from Pugled to Pugled pri Karlovici (literally, 'Pugled near Karlovica') in 1953. The name Pugled is derived from the Slovene word pogled 'bare hill with an open view' and referred to a landscape feature.

== Cultural heritage ==
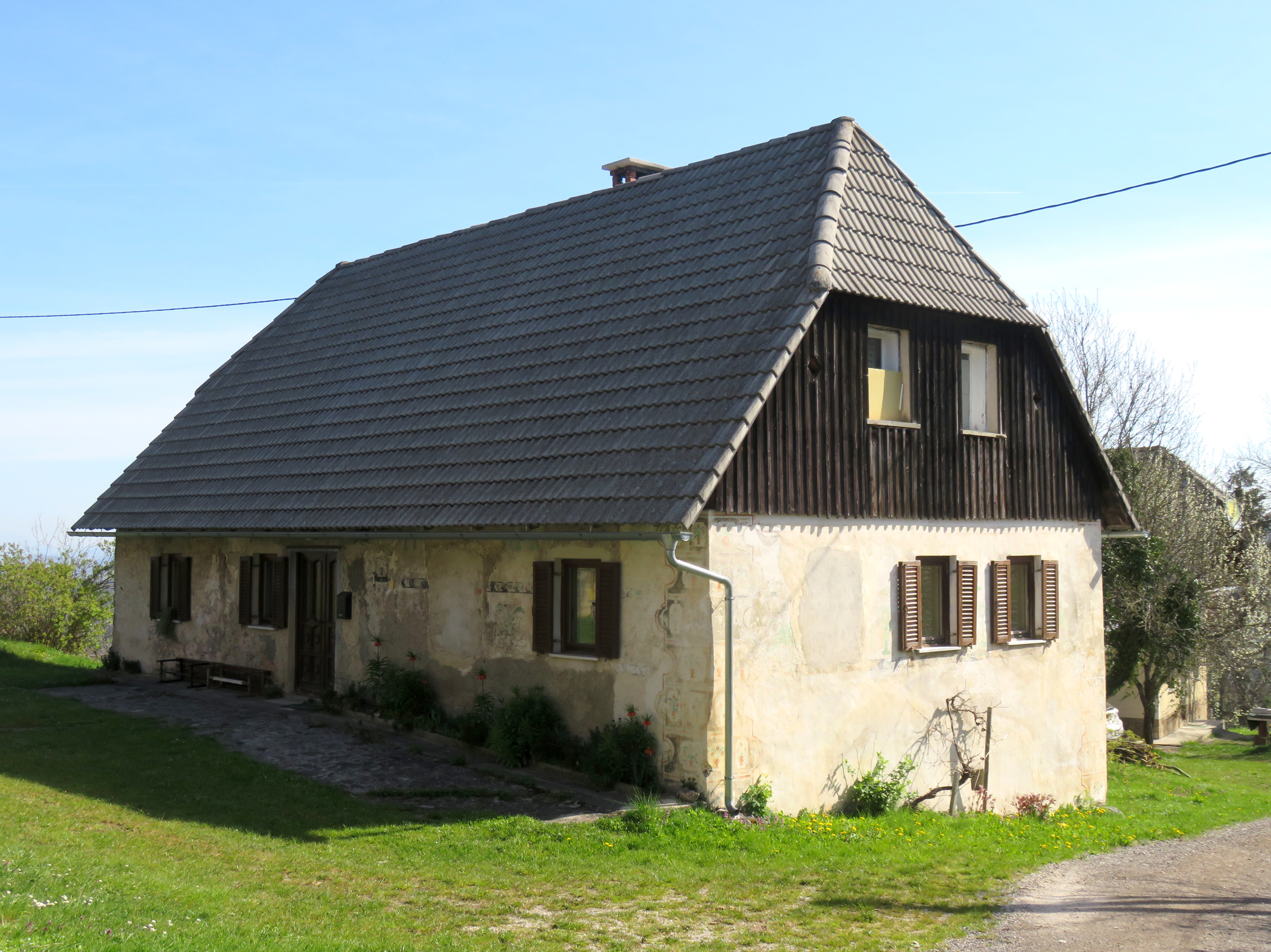
House at Pugled pri Karlovici no. 2

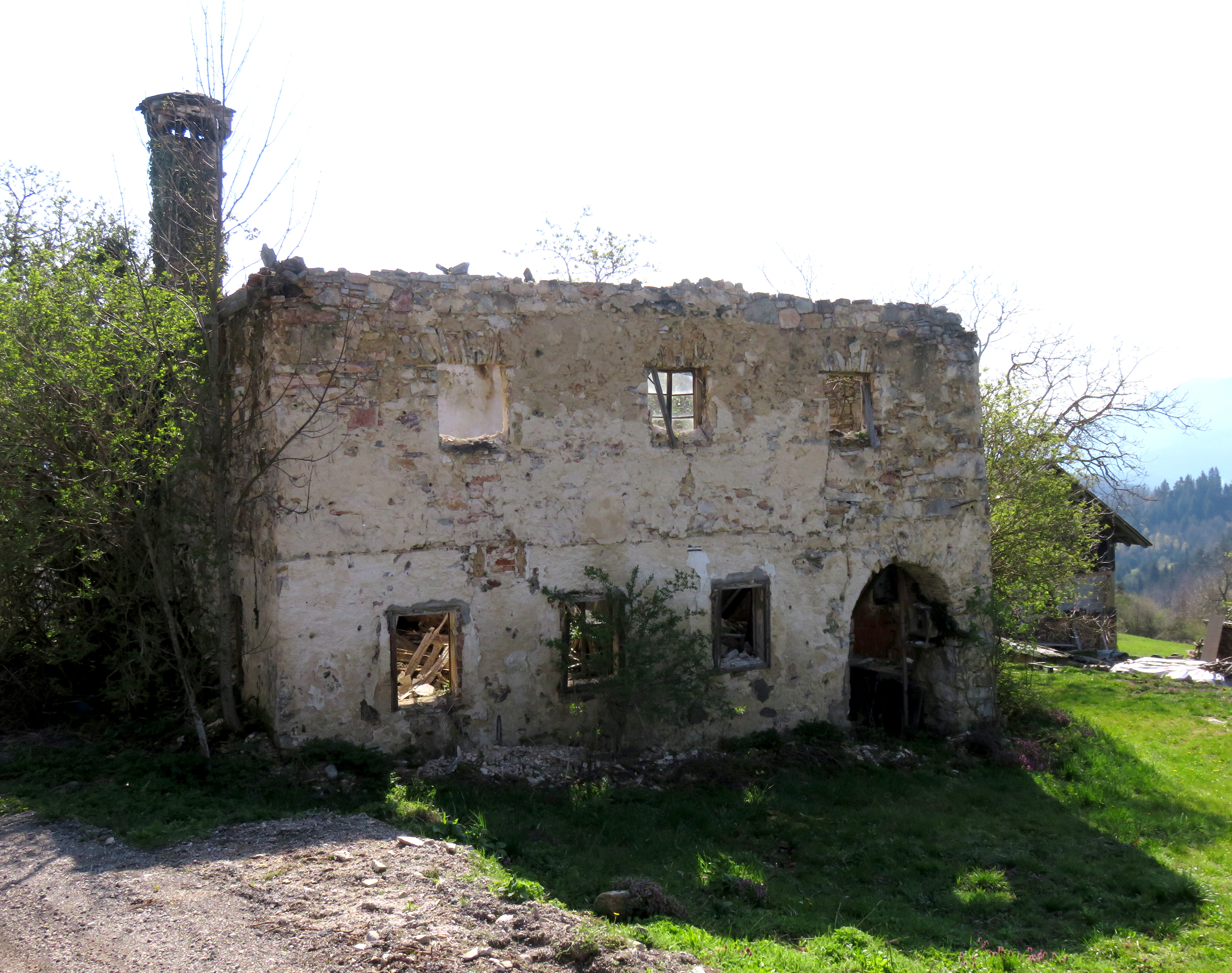
Manor farm ruins

Cultural heritage in Pugled pri Karlovici

Two buildings in Pugled pri Karlovici are registered as cultural heritage.

- The house at Pugled pri Karlovici no. 2 is a two-story rectangular structure with a half-hip roof dating from the end of the 18th century. It has wooden gables and a facade painted in the late Baroque style.
- The remains of a manor farm belonging to Ortnek Castle stand south of the house at Pugled pri Karlovici no. 2. It is a square two-story stone structure, and the year 1732 is carved on the door frame. It had a thatched four-sided roof; the building is now a ruin.
