= Podturn, Mokronog-Trebelno =

Podturn
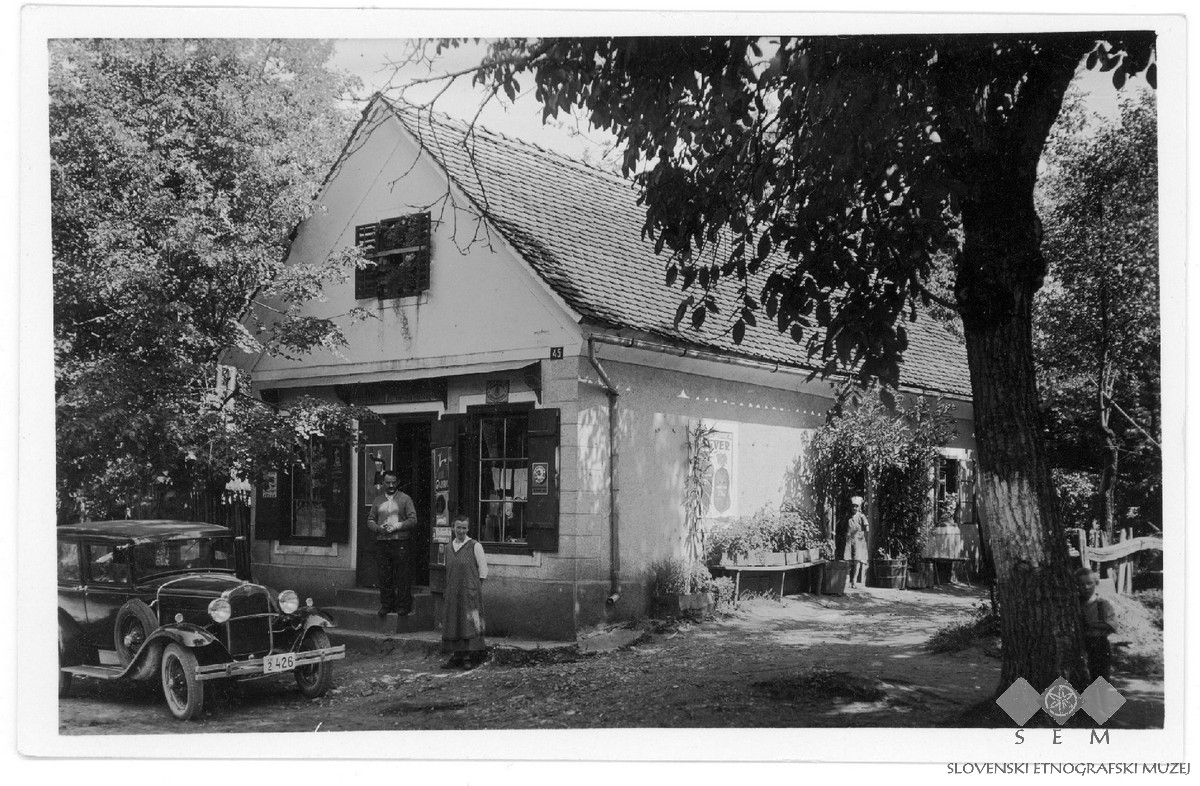
- Postcard of Podturn

- Location in Slovenia
- Coordinates: 45°53′10.54″N 15°8′33.9″E
- Country: Slovenia
- Traditional region: Lower Carniola
- Statistical region: Southeast Slovenia
- Municipality: Mokronog-Trebelno

Area
  - Total: 1.19 km^{2} (0.46 sq mi)
- Elevation: 374.7 m (1,229 ft)

Population (2002)
  - Total: 30

Podturn (pronounced [pɔˈtuːɾn]; in older sources also Podturen) is a small settlement to the south of Trebelno in the Municipality of Mokronog-Trebelno in southeastern Slovenia. The area is part of the historical region of Lower Carniola. The municipality is now included in the Southeast Slovenia Statistical Region.
