= Pugled pri Mokronogu =

- Location in Slovenia
- Coordinates: 45°56′20.4″N 15°8′5.14″E
- Country: Slovenia
- Traditional region: Lower Carniola
- Statistical region: Southeast Slovenia
- Municipality: Mokronog-Trebelno

Area
  - Total: 0.76 km^{2} (0.29 sq mi)
- Elevation: 258.4 m (848 ft)

Population (2002)
  - Total: 15

Pugled pri Mokronogu (pronounced [ˈpuːɡlɛt pɾi mɔˈkɾoːnɔɡu]) is a settlement in the Municipality of Mokronog-Trebelno in southeastern Slovenia. It lies in the hills just southwest of Mokronog in the historical region of Lower Carniola. The municipality is now included in the Southeast Slovenia Statistical Region.

== Name ==
The name of the settlement was changed from Pugled to Pugled pri Mokronogu (literally, 'Pugled near Mokronog') in 1955. The name Pugled is derived from the Slovene word pogled 'bare hill with an open view' and referred to a landscape feature.
