= Bitnja Vas =

- Location in Slovenia
- Coordinates: 45°53′59.22″N 15°7′16.08″E
- Country: Slovenia
- Traditional region: Lower Carniola
- Statistical region: Southeast Slovenia
- Municipality: Mokronog-Trebelno

Area
  - Total: 0.72 km^{2} (0.28 sq mi)
- Elevation: 385.2 m (1,264 ft)

Population (2002)
  - Total: 41

Bitnja Vas (pronounced [ˈbiːtnja ˈʋaːs]; Slovene: Bitnja vas, in older sources also Bitna Vas) is a small village in the Municipality of Mokronog-Trebelno in southeastern Slovenia. The area is part of the historical region of Lower Carniola and is now included in the Southeast Slovenia Statistical Region.

== Name ==
Bitnja Vas was attested in written sources as Wittendorf in 1409, Bittendorf in 1425, and Bitinoues in 1474, among other spellings.
