= Beli Grič =

Beli Grič Sveti Križ (until 1955)
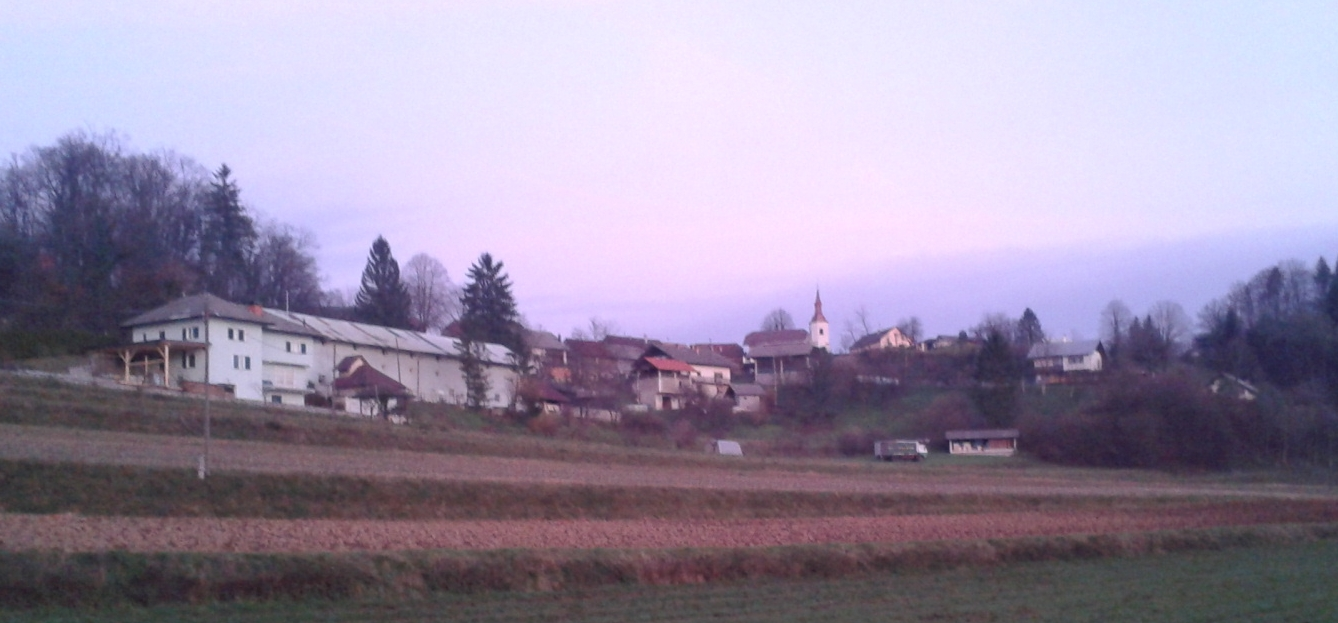

- Location in Slovenia
- Coordinates: 45°56′31.13″N 15°7′30.81″E
- Country: Slovenia
- Traditional region: Lower Carniola
- Statistical region: Southeast Slovenia
- Municipality: Mokronog-Trebelno

Area
  - Total: 0.30 km^{2} (0.12 sq mi)
- Elevation: 282.4 m (927 ft)

Population (2002)
  - Total: 51

Beli Grič (pronounced [ˈbeːli ˈɡɾiːtʃ]; German: Heiligenkreuz) is a small settlement in the Municipality of Mokronog-Trebelno in southeastern Slovenia. The area is part of the historical region of Lower Carniola. The municipality is now included in the Southeast Slovenia Statistical Region.

== Name ==
The name of the settlement was changed from Sveti Križ (literally, 'Holy Cross') to Beli Grič (literally, 'white hill') in 1955. The name was changed on the basis of the 1948 Law on Names of Settlements and Designations of Squares, Streets, and Buildings as part of efforts by Slovenia's postwar communist government to remove religious elements from toponyms. In the past the German name was Heiligenkreuz.

== Church ==
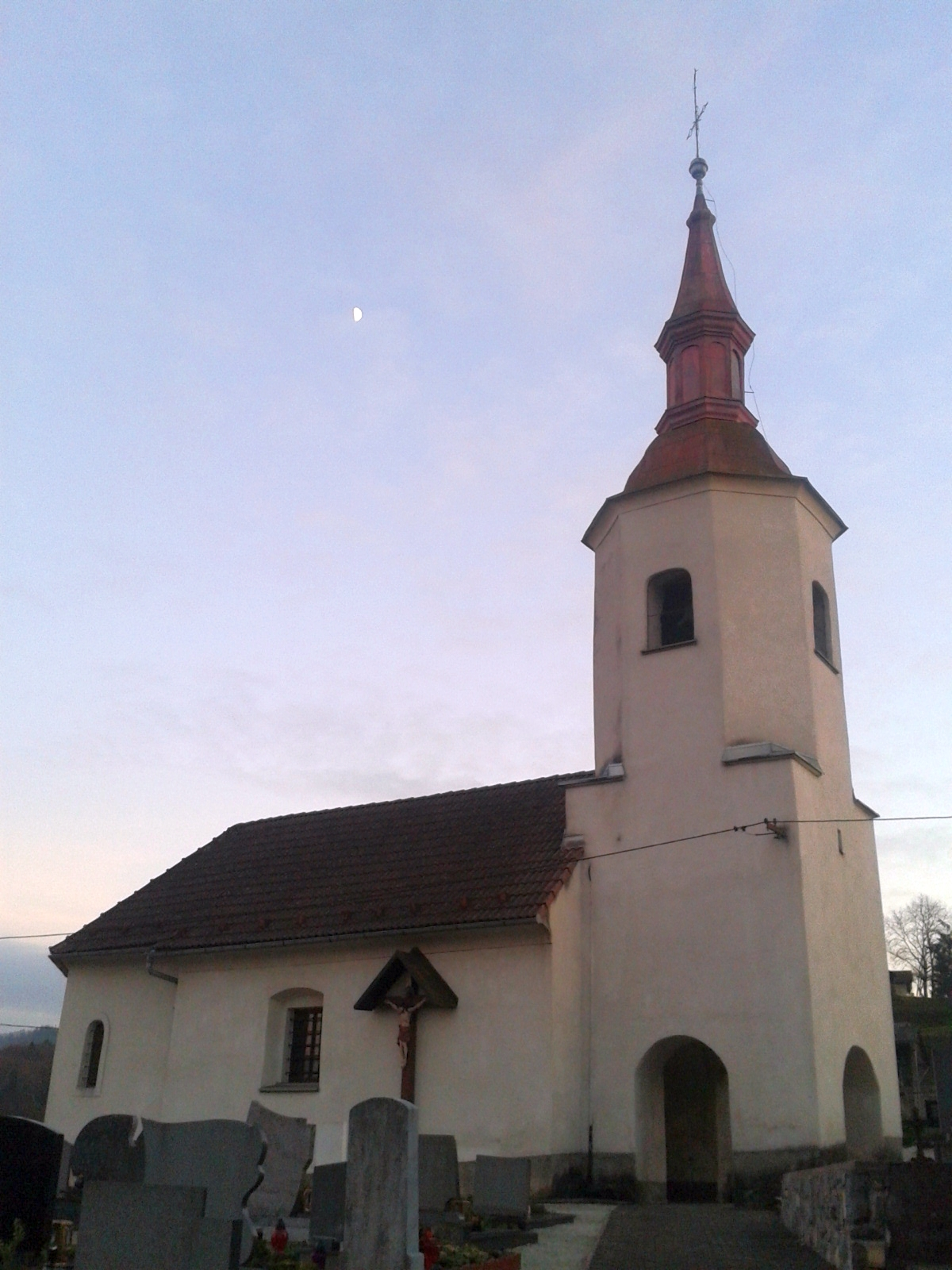
Exaltation of the Holy Cross Church

The local church in the settlement is dedicated to the Holy Cross (Slovene: sveti Križ) and belongs to the Parish of Mokronog. It was first mentioned in written documents dating to 1526 and was extended in the 17th century and restyled in the Baroque in the 18th century.
