= Trebelno =

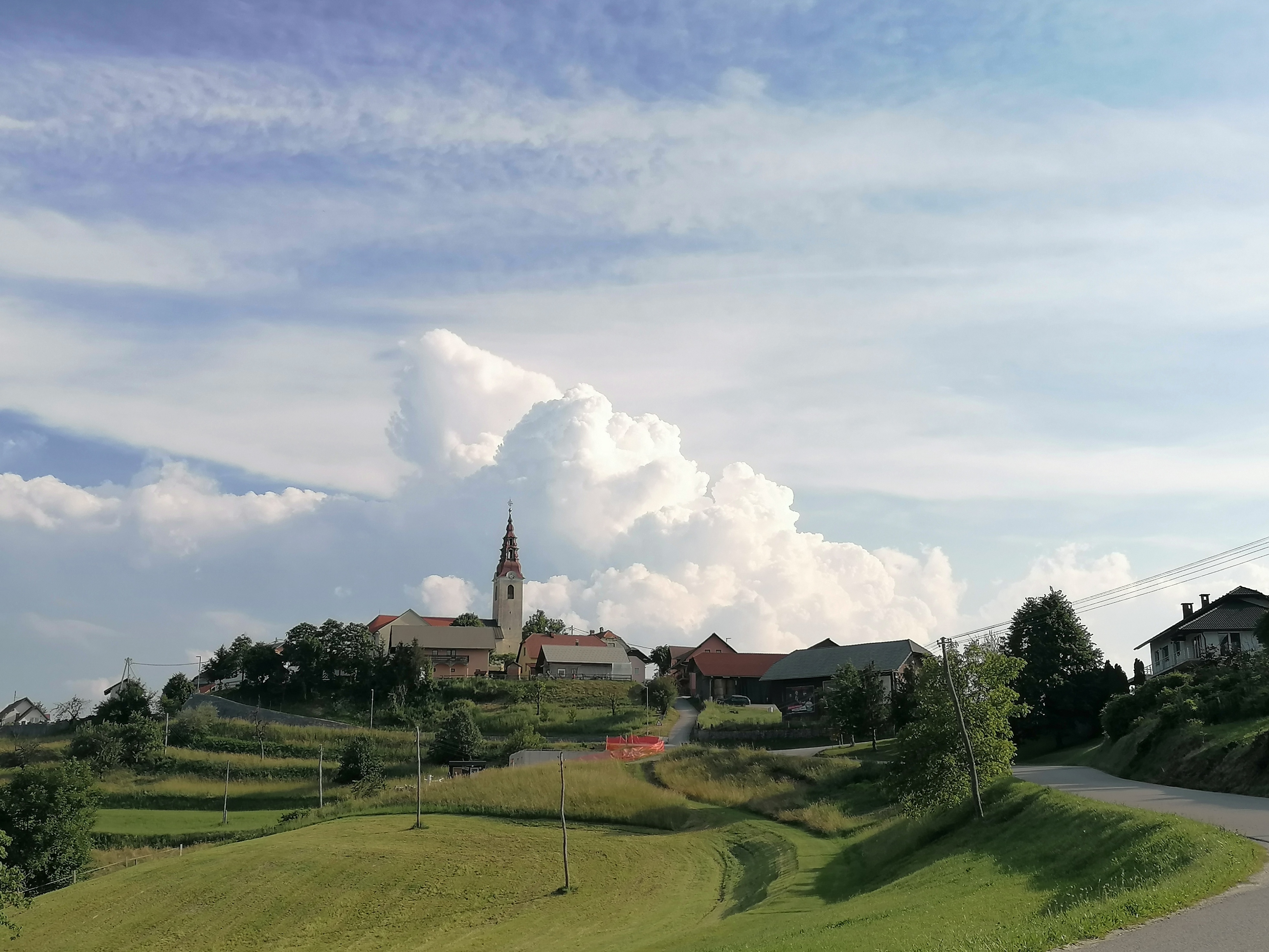

- Location in Slovenia
- Coordinates: 45°54′43.48″N 15°9′0.13″E
- Country: Slovenia
- Traditional region: Lower Carniola
- Statistical region: Southeast Slovenia
- Municipality: Mokronog-Trebelno

Area
  - Total: 1.69 km^{2} (0.65 sq mi)
- Elevation: 517.6 m (1,698 ft)

Population (2002)
  - Total: 110

Trebelno (pronounced [tɾɛˈbéːu̯nɔ]) is a village in the Municipality of Mokronog-Trebelno in the traditional region of Lower Carniola of southeastern Slovenia. The municipality is now included in the Southeast Slovenia Statistical Region.

The parish church, built on a slight elevation in the centre of the settlement, is dedicated to the Holy Cross and belongs to the Roman Catholic Diocese of Novo Mesto. It dates to the 16th century and was largely rebuilt in the late 18th century.
