= Mokronog =

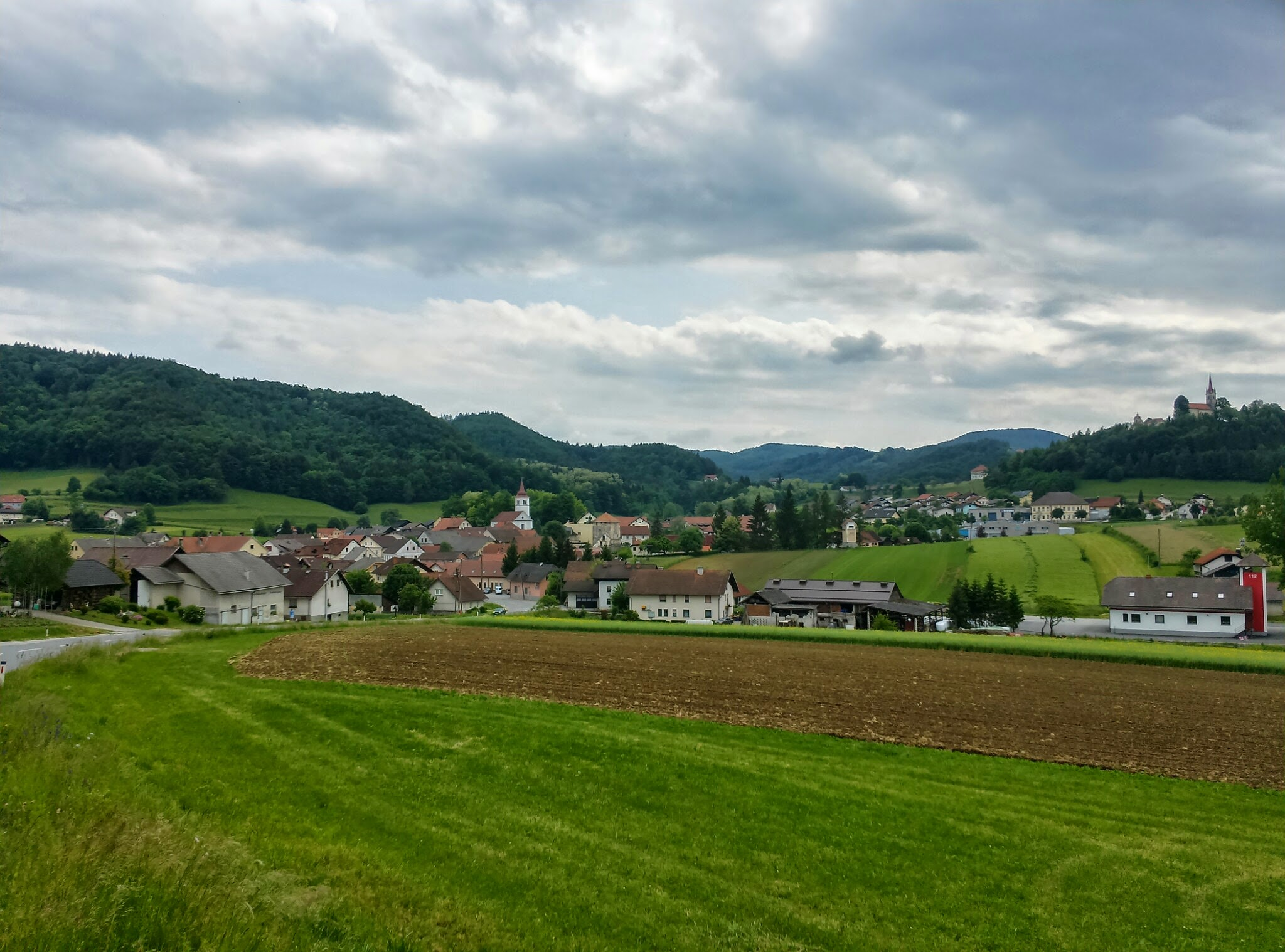

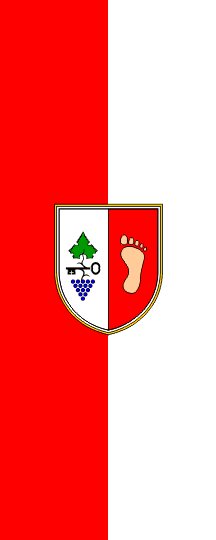
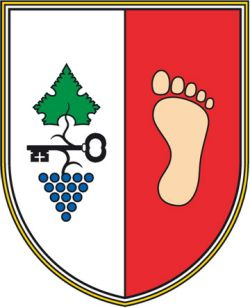
- Flag Coat of arms

- Location in Slovenia
- Coordinates: 45°56′33.29″N 15°8′56.25″E
- Country: Slovenia
- Traditional region: Lower Carniola
- Statistical region: Southeast Slovenia
- Municipality: Mokronog-Trebelno

Area
  - Total: 11.73 km^{2} (4.53 sq mi)
- Elevation: 255.8 m (839 ft)

Population (2002)
  - Total: 700

Mokronog (pronounced [mɔˈkɾòːnɔk]; German: Nassenfuß) is a settlement in the Municipality of Mokronog-Trebelno in southeastern Slovenia. It is also the administrative centre of the municipality. The area is part of the historical region of Lower Carniola. The municipality is now included in the Southeast Slovenia Statistical Region.

== Name ==
Mokronog was first attested in written sources in 1137 under the German name Nazuŏz (and as Nazzenfuz in 1143 and Nazzenvozzen in 1158). The Slovene name Mokronag was not attested until 1689. The name was originally a genitive plural (nominative *Mokronozi, accusative *Mokronoge; cf. the related place names Mokronoge and Mokronoge, both in Bosnia-Herzegovina) that was reinterpreted as a singular. It is believed to be a compound of the adjective moker 'wet' + the noun noga 'foot of a hill/mountain', thus originally meaning 'wet area at the foot of a mountain'. The hypothesis that the name means 'wet foot' as a humorous reference to people living in a wet place is less likely. Also less likely is the hypothesis that it is derived from *Makromьnovo (< *ma- 'somehow' + *kromьnъ 'hidden'). In the past the German name was Nassenfuß.

== Churches ==
The parish church in the settlement is dedicated to Saint Giles (Slovene: sveti Egidij) and belongs to the Roman Catholic Diocese of Novo Mesto. It was built in the style of the late-Baroque Neoclassicism from 1822 to 1824 on the site of an older church that collapsed. The church tower was redesigned in 1940 based on plans by the architect Janez Valentinčič, a student of Jože Plečnik. A second church in the northern part of the settlement (Šeginke) is dedicated to Saint Florian. It dates to the mid-17th century. A third church stands to the west on Mount Sorrow (Slovene: Žalostna gora, German: Trauerberg, 366 m). It is dedicated to Our Lady of Sorrows and dates from 1697, with 18th- and 19th-century painting.

== History ==
Mokronog was first mentioned in 1137, and acquired market rights in 1279. Around 1340, a wall was built around the town, of which only a tower now remains. The town suffered severely from Ottoman raids in the 16th and 17th century and it lost most of its population. It regained some of its former importance only in early 19th century, when it became a center of the leather industry. The leather factory was completely destroyed in 1943 by a Nazi air strike.

A 13th-century castle with 15th-, 17th-, and 18th-century additions, built on a hill south of the parish church, was burned down by the Yugoslav Partisans after the capitulation of Italy in 1943 and further demolished after the Second World War.
