= List of cities, towns, and villages in Slovenia: H =

This is a list of cities, towns, and villages in Slovenia, starting with H.

Settlement	Municipality
Hajdoše	Hajdina
Hajndl	Ormož
Hajnsko	Šmarje pri Jelšah
Hardek	Ormož
Harije	Ilirska Bistrica
Harje	Laško
Hercegovščak	Gornja Radgona
Herinja vas	Novo Mesto
Hermanci	Ormož
Hinje	Sevnica
Hinje	Žužemberk
Hiteno	Bloke
Hlaponci	Juršinci
Hlavče Njive	Gorenja vas-Poljane
Hlebce	Radovljica
Hlebče	Velike Lašče
Hleviše	Logatec
Hlevni Vrh	Logatec
Hlevnik	Brda
Hmeljčič	Mirna Peč
Hobovše pri Stari Oselici	Gorenja vas-Poljane
Hočevje	Dobrepolje
Hočko Pohorje	Hoče-Slivnica
Hodoš	Hodoš
Hohovica	Litija
Hojče	Ribnica
Hom	Trebnje
Homec	Domžale
Homec	Kobarid
Homec	Mozirje
Homec	Vojnik
Horjul	Horjul
Hosta	Škofja Loka
Hošnica	Slovenska Bistrica
Hotavlje	Gorenja vas-Poljane
Hotedršica	Logatec
Hotemaže	Šenčur
Hotemež	Radeče
Hotična	Hrpelje-Kozina
Hotinja vas	Hoče-Slivnica
Hotiza	Lendava
Hotovlja	Gorenja vas-Poljane
Hotunje	Šentjur
Hramše	Žalec
Hranjigovci	Ormož
Hrast pri Jugorju	Metlika
Hrast pri Vinici	Črnomelj
Hrastek	Krško
Hrastenice	Dobrova-Polhov Gradec
Hrastje ob Bistrici	Bistrica ob Sotli
Hrastje pri Cerkljah	Brežice
Hrastje pri Grosupljem	Grosuplje
Hrastje pri Mirni Peči	Mirna Peč
Hrastje	Maribor
Hrastje	Šenčur
Hrastje	Šentjernej
Hrastje	Šentjur
Hrastje-Mota	Radenci
Hrastnik pri Trojanah	Zagorje ob Savi
Hrastnik	Hrastnik
Hrastnik	Moravče
Hrastnik	Vojnik
Hrastno	Trebnje
Hrastov Dol	Ivančna Gorica
Hrastovec pod Bočem	Slovenska Bistrica
Hrastovec v Slovenskih Goricah	Lenart
Hrastovec	Velenje
Hrastovec	Zavrč
Hrastovica	Trebnje
Hrastovlje	Koper
Hrastulje	Škocjan
Hrašče	Postojna
Hrašče	Vipava
Hraše pri Preddvoru	Preddvor
Hraše	Medvode
Hraše	Radovljica
Hrašenski Vrh	Radenci
Hreljin	Kočevje
Hrenca	Maribor
Hrenova	Vojnik
Hrenovice	Postojna
Hrib nad Ribčami	Moravče
Hrib pri Cerovcu	Semič
Hrib pri Fari	Kostel
Hrib pri Hinjah	Žužemberk
Hrib pri Kamniku	Kamnik
Hrib pri Koprivniku	Kočevje
Hrib pri Orehku	Novo Mesto
Hrib pri Rožnem Dolu	Semič
Hrib	Novo Mesto
Hrib	Preddvor
Hribarjevo	Bloke
Hribi	Lukovica
Hribi	Sežana
Hribljane	Cerknica
Hrib-Loški Potok	Loški Potok
Hrovača	Ribnica
Hrpelje	Hrpelje-Kozina
Hrustovo	Velike Lašče
Hruševec	Šentjur
Hruševica	Komen
Hruševje	Postojna
Hruševka	Kamnik
Hruševlje	Brda
Hruševo	Dobrova-Polhov Gradec
Hrušica	Ilirska Bistrica
Hrušica	Jesenice
Hrušica	Novo Mesto
Hruškarje	Cerknica
Hrušovje	Šentjur
Hrvaški Brod	Šentjernej
Hrvatini	Koper
Huda Jama	Laško
Huda Polica	Grosuplje
Hudajužna	Tolmin
Hude Ravne	Litija
Hudeje	Trebnje
Hudenje	Škocjan
Hudi Graben	Tržič
Hudi Konec	Ribnica
Hudi Kot	Ribnica na Pohorju
Hudi Log	Miren-Kostanjevica
Hudi Vrh	Bloke
Hudinja	Vitanje
Hudo Brezje	Sevnica
Hudo	Domžale
Hudo	Novo Mesto
Hudo	Tržič
Hujbar	Ormož
Huje	Ilirska Bistrica
Hum pri Ormožu	Ormož
Hum	Brda
Hušica	Tržič
Hvaletinci	Sveti Andraž v Slovenskih goricah
