= Hrastnik, Moravče =

Hrastnik
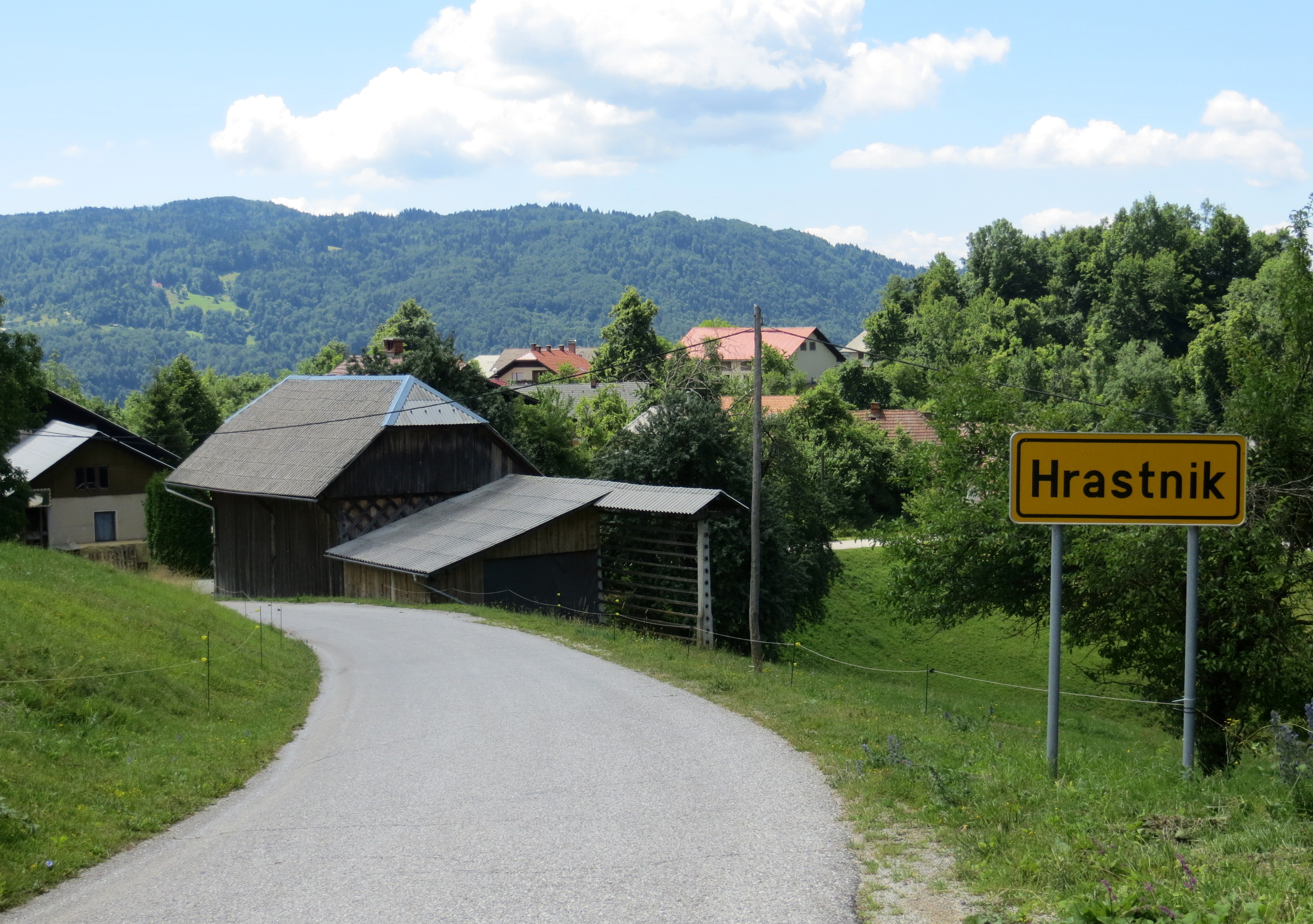

- Location in Slovenia
- Coordinates: 46°9′18.7″N 14°47′24″E
- Country: Slovenia
- Traditional region: Upper Carniola
- Statistical region: Central Slovenia
- Municipality: Moravče

Area
  - Total: 2.05 km^{2} (0.79 sq mi)
- Elevation: 619.7 m (2,033 ft)

Population (2002)
  - Total: 45
- Postal code: 1251

Hrastnik (pronounced [ˈxɾaːstnik]; German: Hrastnigg) is a settlement in the hills to the northeast of Moravče in central Slovenia. The area is part of the traditional region of Upper Carniola. It is now included with the rest of the Municipality of Moravče in the Central Slovenia Statistical Region. The settlement includes the hamlets of Kal, Hruševje, and Grad.

== Name ==
Hrastnik was attested in historical sources as Kraͤsnyk in 1409, Crastnik in 1425, and Krestnikch in 1436. The name Hrastnik is derived from the Slovene common noun hrast 'oak'. Like similar names (e.g., Hrastje, Hrastovica, Hraše), it originally referred to the local vegetation. In the past the German name was Hrastnigg.

== History ==
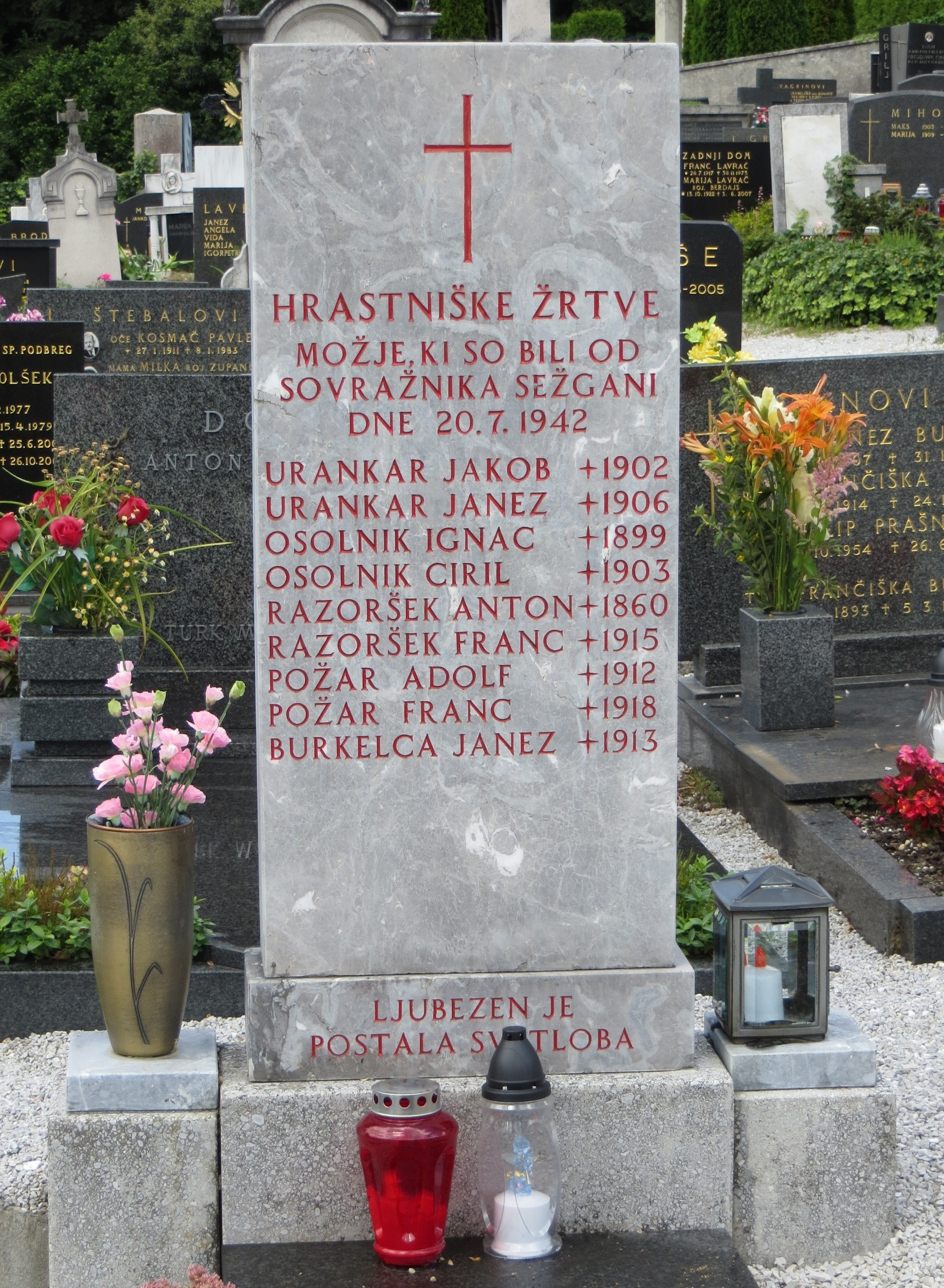
Grave of the Hrastnik victims in Moravče

During the Second World War, there was extensive Partisan activity in Hrastnik starting in the summer of 1941. On 20 June 1942, the Partisans held a rally in the village, and the German authorities imposed a curfew on the village. Early on the morning of 20 July 1942, German forces surrounded the village. The young men fled to the surrounding hills, and the troops took eight men to the Vrban barn. Then they looted the village and evicted the women and children, who were sent to various concentration camps. The German soldiers then burned the village, including the barn where the village men were held prisoner. A ninth man, who fled a burning mow, was shot and locked in the burning barn. The soldiers then dynamited the ceramic ovens and cellars of the houses, destroying them completely. The German authorities did not permit the villagers to bury the dead in the Moravče cemetery, and their remains were interred in a mass grave by the village chapel-shrine. The remains were later moved to the Moravče cemetery. A monument commemorating the event was erected in the village in 1950.
