= Hrustovo =

Hrustovo refers to the following places:

- Hrustovo, Velike Lašče, village in Slovenia
- Hrustovo, Sanski Most, village in Bosnia and Herzegovina
