= Hrašče, Postojna =

Hrašče
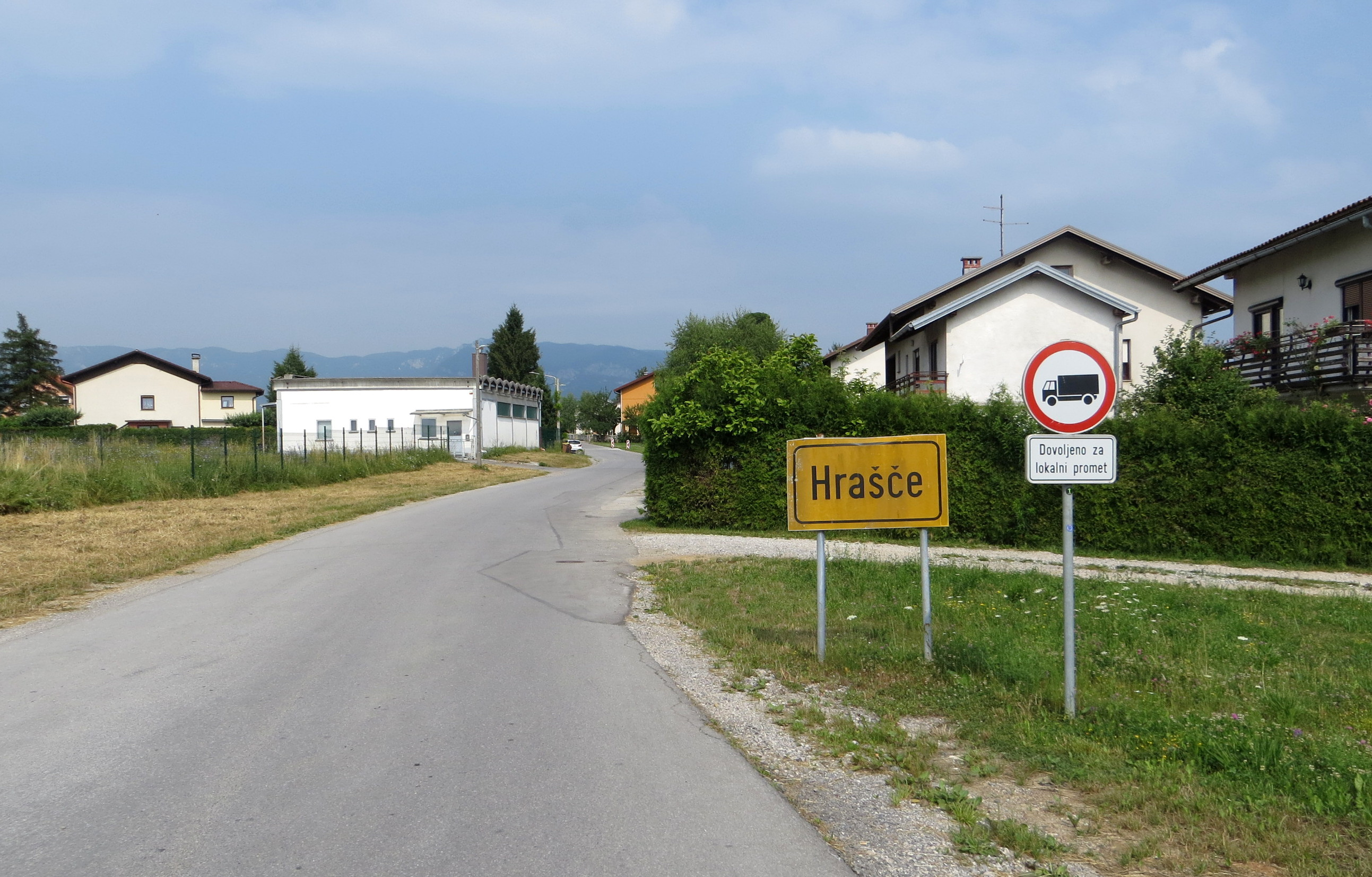

- Location in Slovenia
- Coordinates: 45°46′39.95″N 14°9′11″E
- Country: Slovenia
- Traditional region: Inner Carniola
- Statistical region: Littoral–Inner Carniola
- Municipality: Postojna

Area
  - Total: 4.22 km^{2} (1.63 sq mi)
- Elevation: 540.2 m (1,772 ft)

Population (2002)
  - Total: 351

Hrašče (pronounced [ˈxɾaːʃtʃɛ]; German: Hraschtsche, Italian: Crastie) is a village west of Postojna in the Inner Carniola region of Slovenia.

== Name ==
Hrašče was attested in written sources in 1498 as Krasschach, with a locative ending. The name Hrašče, like similar names (e.g., Hraše, Hrastje, Hrastovica, Hrastnik), is derived from the plural demonym *Hrasťane, in turn derived from the word hrast 'oak', and originally referred to the local vegetation.

== Church ==
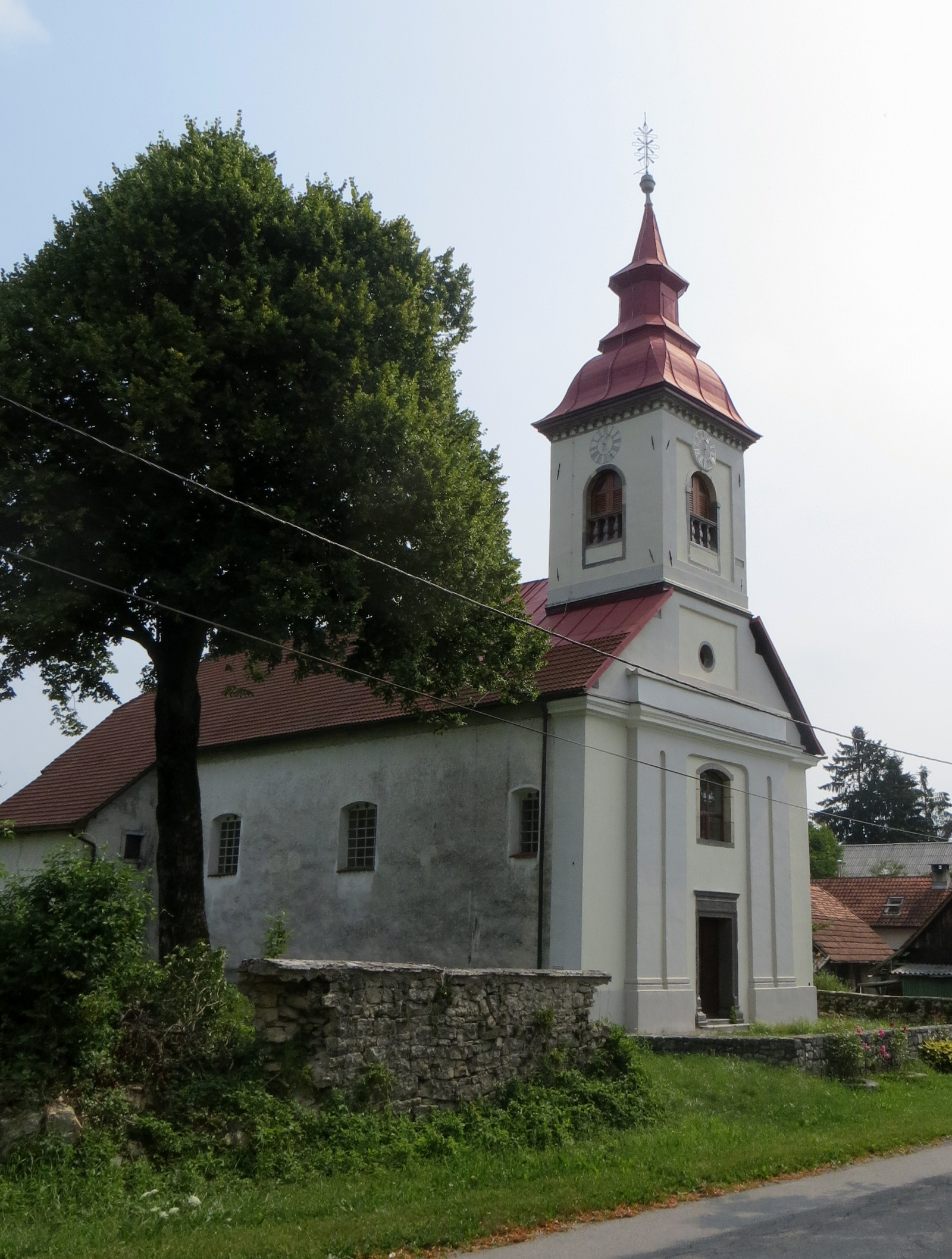
Saint Anne's Church

The local church in the settlement is dedicated to Saint Anne and belongs to the Parish of Hrenovice.
