= Ratje =

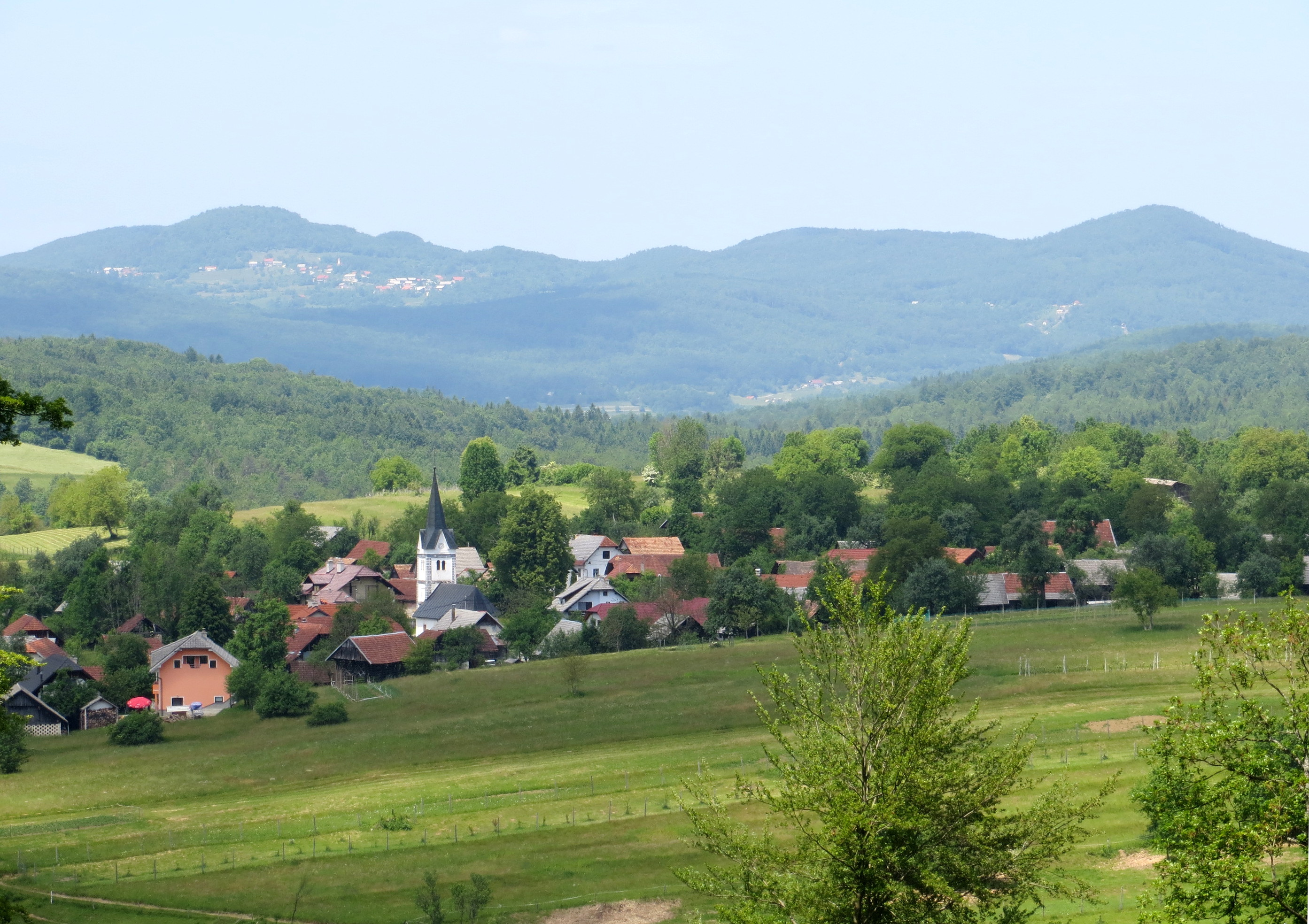

- Location in Slovenia
- Coordinates: 45°47′4.23″N 14°51′56.13″E
- Country: Slovenia
- Traditional region: Lower Carniola
- Statistical region: Southeast Slovenia
- Municipality: Žužemberk

Area
  - Total: 5.94 km^{2} (2.29 sq mi)
- Elevation: 404.7 m (1,328 ft)

Population (2002)
  - Total: 35

Ratje (pronounced [ˈɾaːtjɛ]) is a small village in the Municipality of Žužemberk in southeastern Slovenia. The area is part of the historical region of Lower Carniola. The municipality is now included in the Southeast Slovenia Statistical Region.

== Church ==
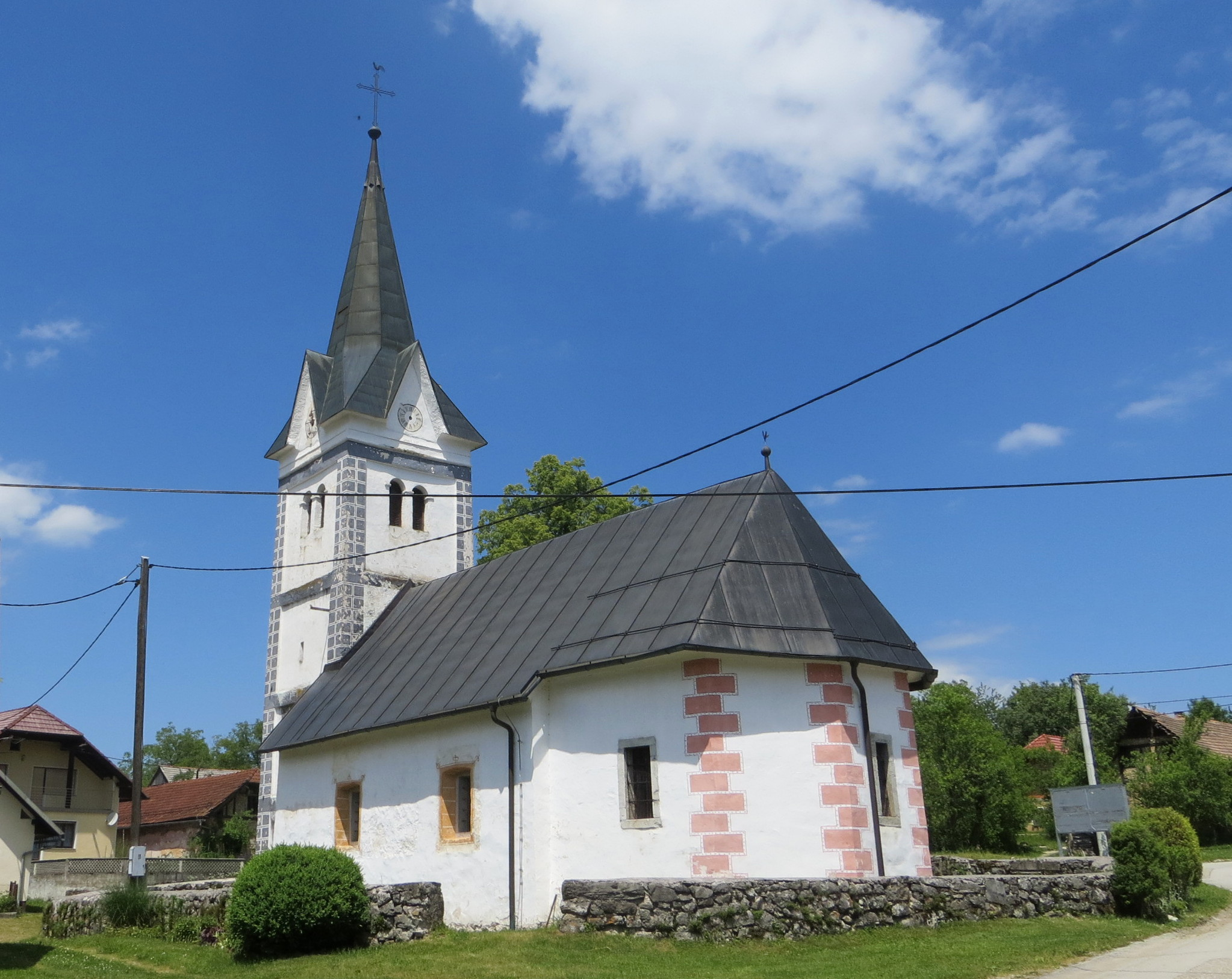
Saints Primus and Felician Church

The local church is dedicated to Saints Primus and Felician and belongs to the Parish of Hinje. It has a Romanesque nave and an 18th-century belfry.
