= Veliko Lipje =

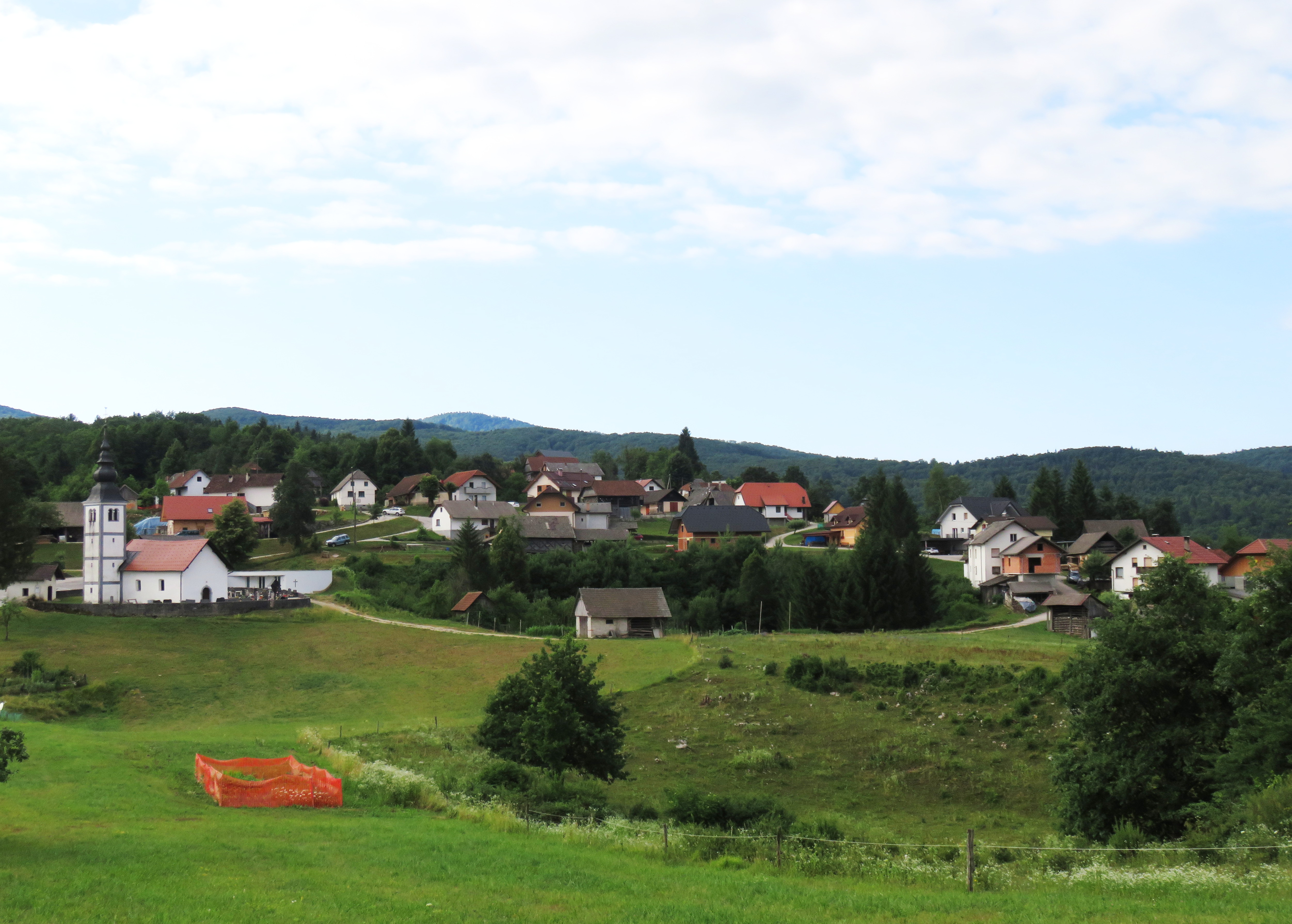

- Location in Slovenia
- Coordinates: 45°47′56.89″N 14°55′12.82″E
- Country: Slovenia
- Traditional region: Lower Carniola
- Statistical region: Southeast Slovenia
- Municipality: Žužemberk

Area
  - Total: 2.15 km^{2} (0.83 sq mi)
- Elevation: 291.7 m (957 ft)

Population (2002)
  - Total: 41

Veliko Lipje (pronounced [ˈʋeːlikɔ ˈliːpjɛ]; German: Großliplach) is a village in the Municipality of Žužemberk in southeastern Slovenia. The area is part of the historical region of Lower Carniola. The municipality is now included in the Southeast Slovenia Statistical Region.

== Name ==
The name Veliko Lipje literally means 'big Lipje' (in contrast to the neighboring village of Malo Lipje 'little Lipje'). The name is derived from a demonym (originally plural, *Lipľane 'residents of Lipa'), ultimately from the common noun lipa 'linden', referring to the local vegetation.

== Church ==
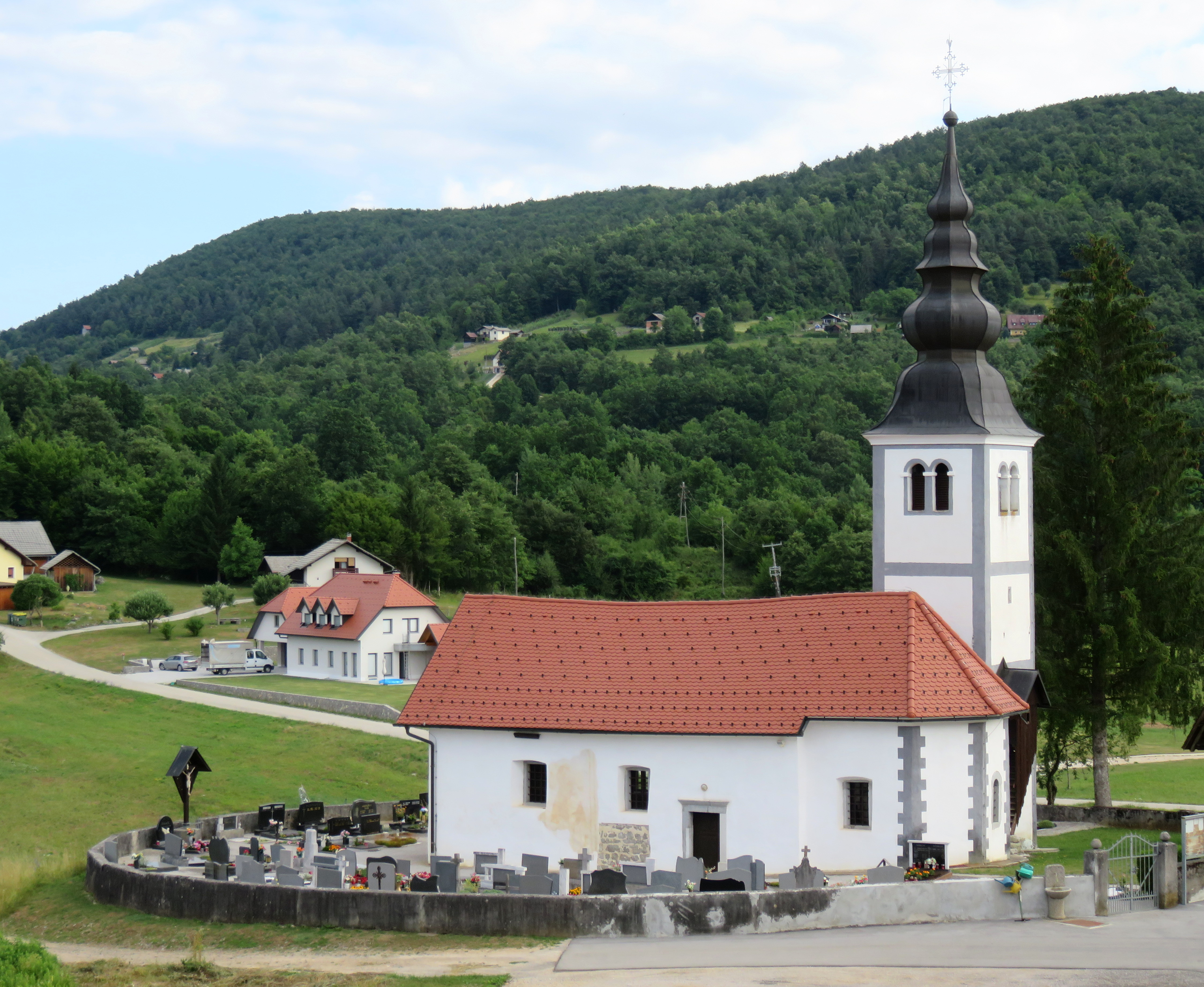
Saint Martin's Church

The local church is dedicated to Saint Martin and belongs to the Parish of Hinje. It is a 14th-century building that was restyled in the Baroque in the second half of the 17th century.
