= Janž Tulščak =

- Born: Unknown; Gracar Turn
- Died: c. 1594; Unknown
- Occupation: Priest
- Known for: Protestant preacher and writer

Janž Tulščak (? – c. 1594, first name also spelled Ivan, Hans, last name also spelled Tulschak, Tulszhak, a.k.a. Feistenberger or Scherer) was a Slovene Protestant preacher and writer. His designation Feistenberger (literally, 'person from Feistenberg') comes from the German name for his birthplace, Gracar Turn (German: Feistenberg).

== Life ==
Tulščak was born at Gracar Turn. He initially served as a Catholic priest in White Carniola. Together with Gregor Vlahovič, in Metlika he started preaching in the Protestant spirit and at the same time participated in the committee that approved the Croatian translations of Primož Trubar's books. In 1571 he became the assistant preacher in Ljubljana, and in 1581 the provincial preacher. Among other duties, he was on the committee for revising Jurij Dalmatin's translation of the Bible.

== Work ==
Kerſzhanske leipe molitve (Beautiful Christian Prayers), 1579

Tulščak also prepared the first Slovene prayer book, Kerſzhanske leipe molitve (Beautiful Christian Prayers), which was printed in 1579 at Johann Manlius's press in Ljubljana. It contains prayers translated from Latin and German, to which Tulščak added a long polemic sermon on proper prayer.
