= Gracar Turn =

Coordinates: 45°48′59″N 15°17′49.13″E

Gracar Turn (Slovene: Gracarjev turn, German: Feistenberg) is a 14th-century castle on the northern outskirts of Hrastje in the Municipality of Šentjernej in the traditional region of Lower Carniola in southeastern Slovenia.

== History ==
The castle is not recorded in medieval sources, although the historian Johann Weikhard von Valvasor mentions that a manor stood on the site in the 14th century, built by the Grätzer family from nearby Gradac, whence its name derives. After passing through numerous hands, it was purchased by Anton Rudež in 1821. The author Janez Trdina was often Rudež's guest at Gracar Turn; several of Trdina's works were written at the castle, including his best-known, Tales and Stories of the Gorjanci Hills. During World War II part of the castle was burned down by the Partisans. It has since been renovated.

The core of the castle consists of a multistory residential palacium, surrounded by a rectangular complex anchored by two imposing square towers.

== Notable people ==
Notable people that were born or lived at Gracar Turn include:

- Janž Tulščak (?–1594), Protestant preacher and writer

== Gallery ==
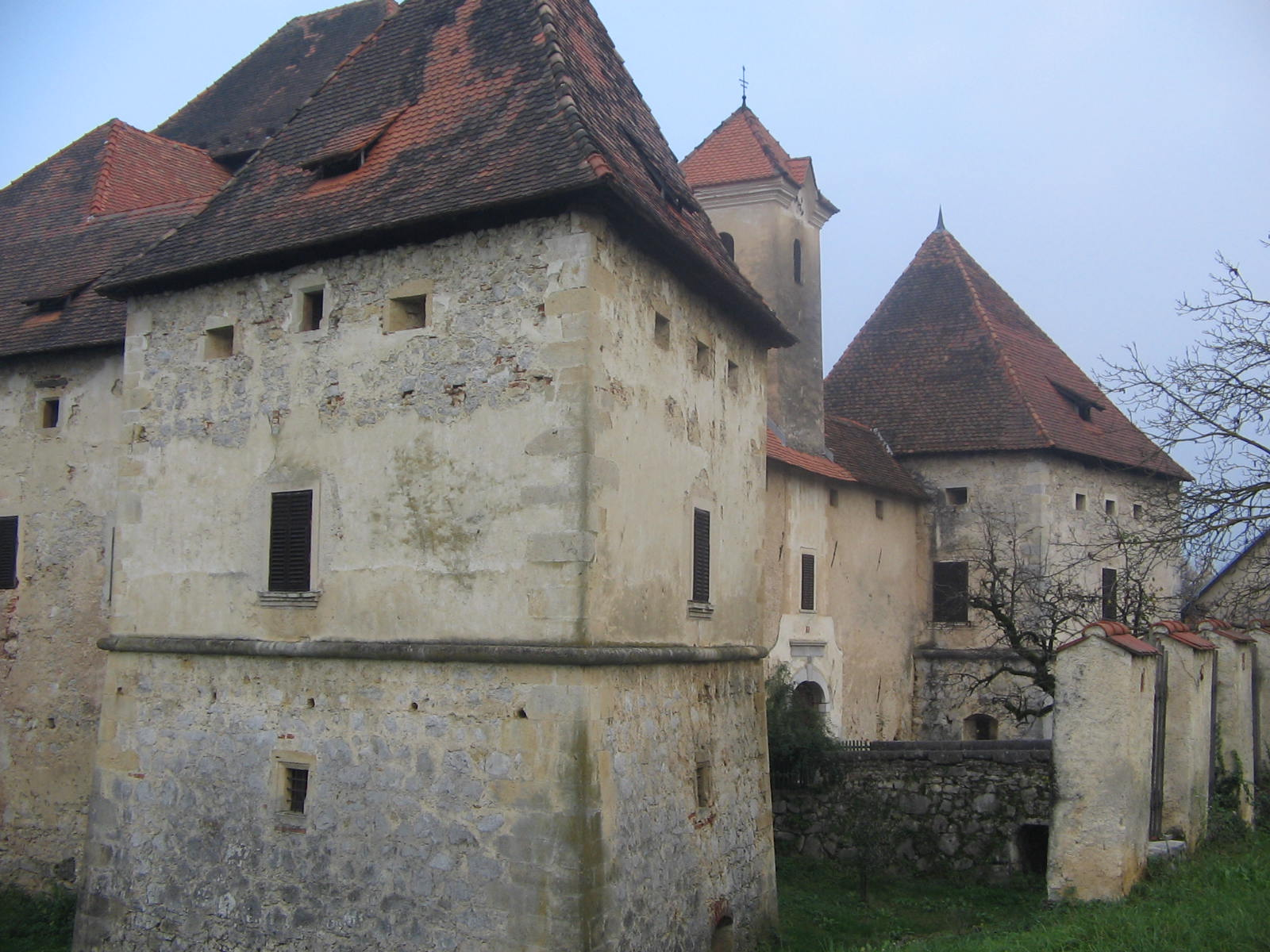
Gatehouse

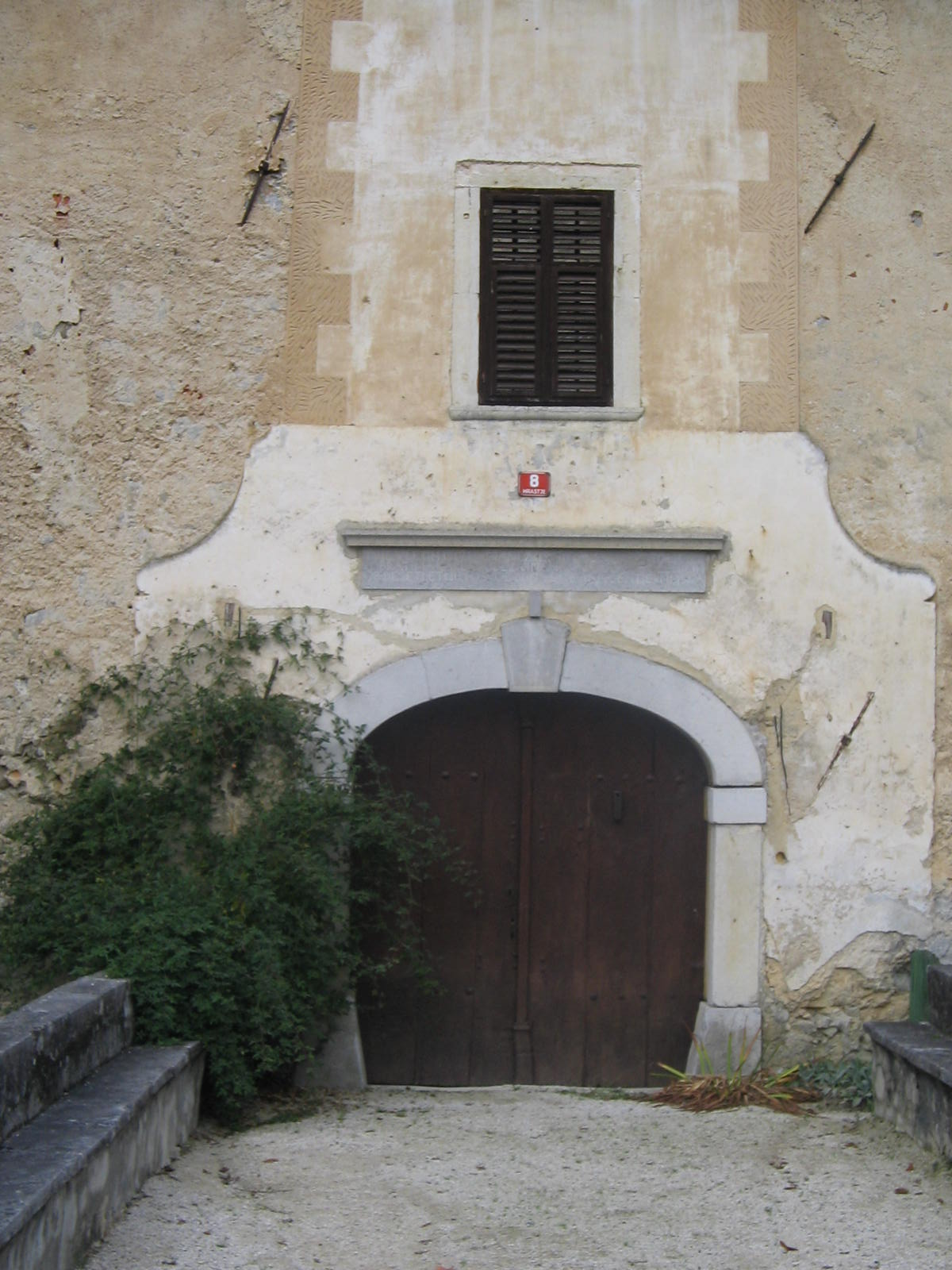
Gate

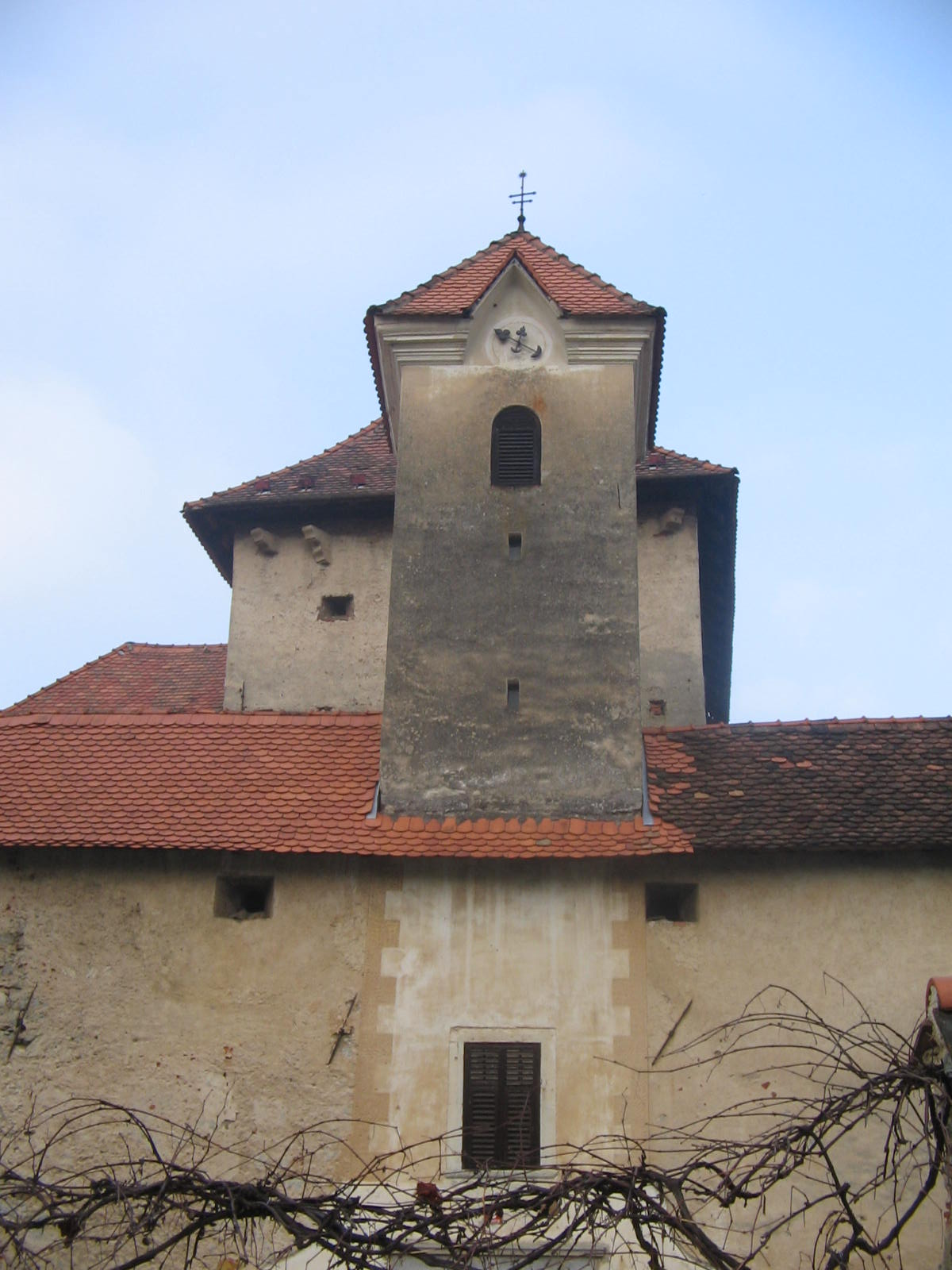
Clocktower (above portico)

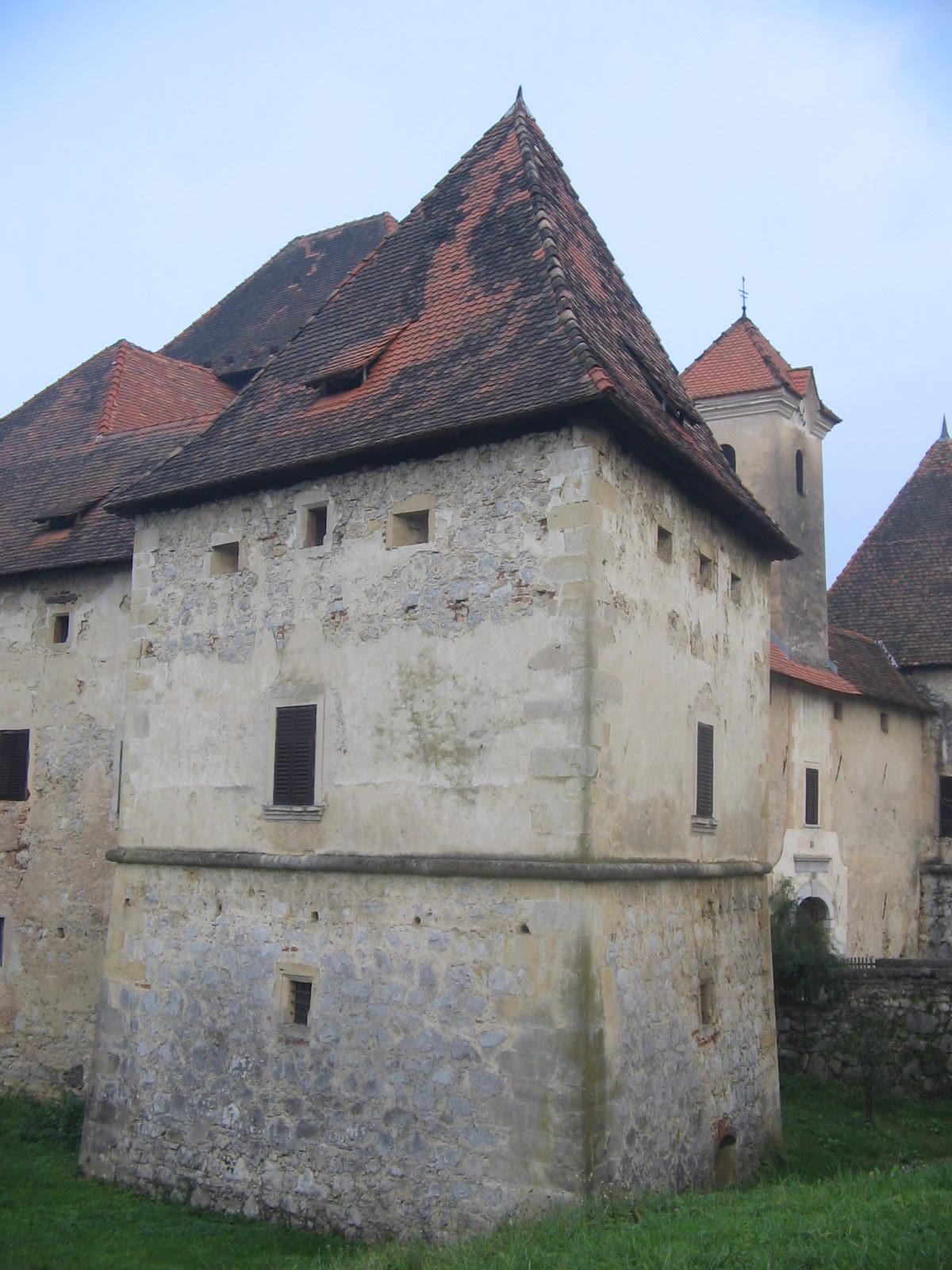
Tower

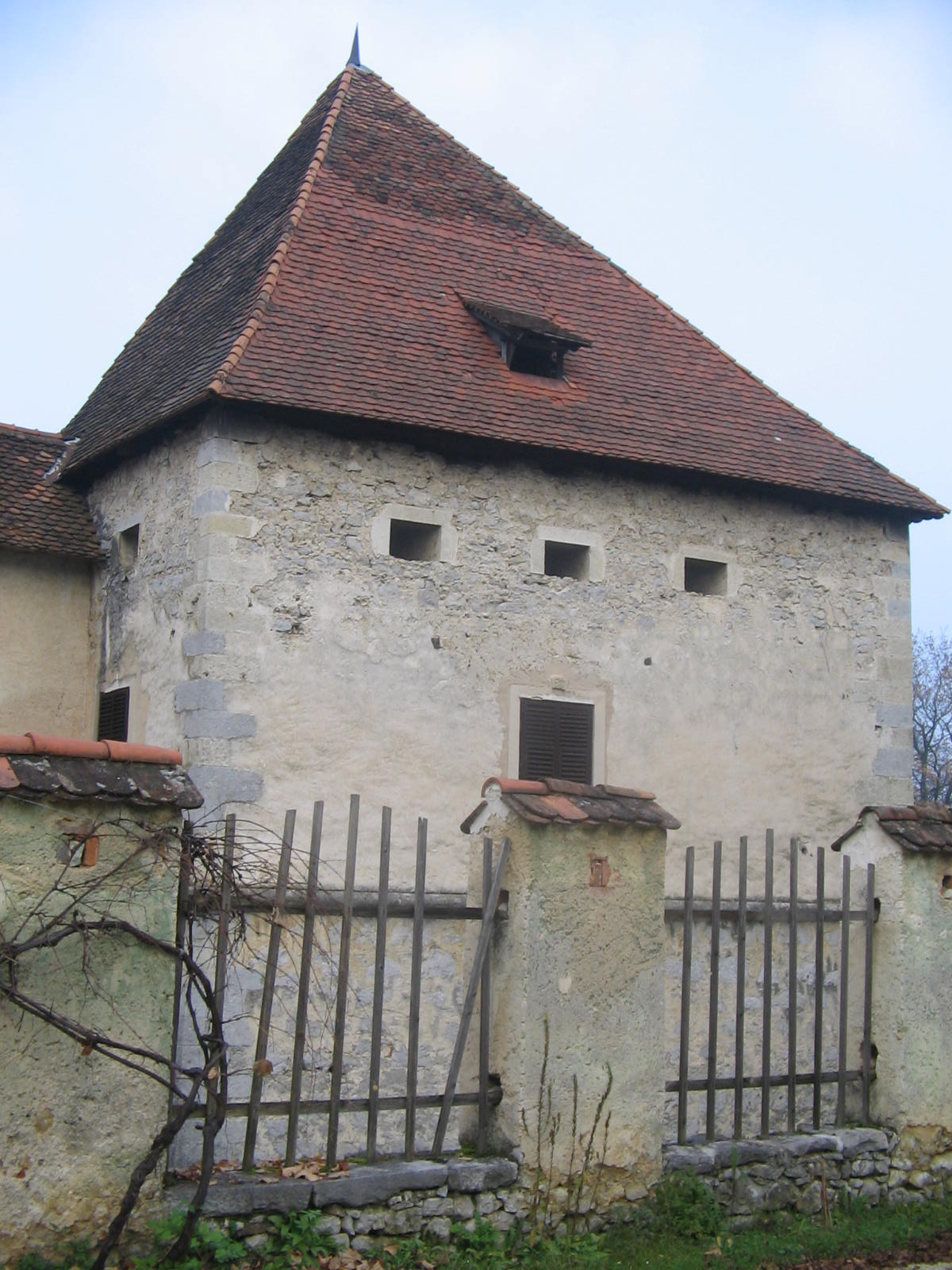
Tower

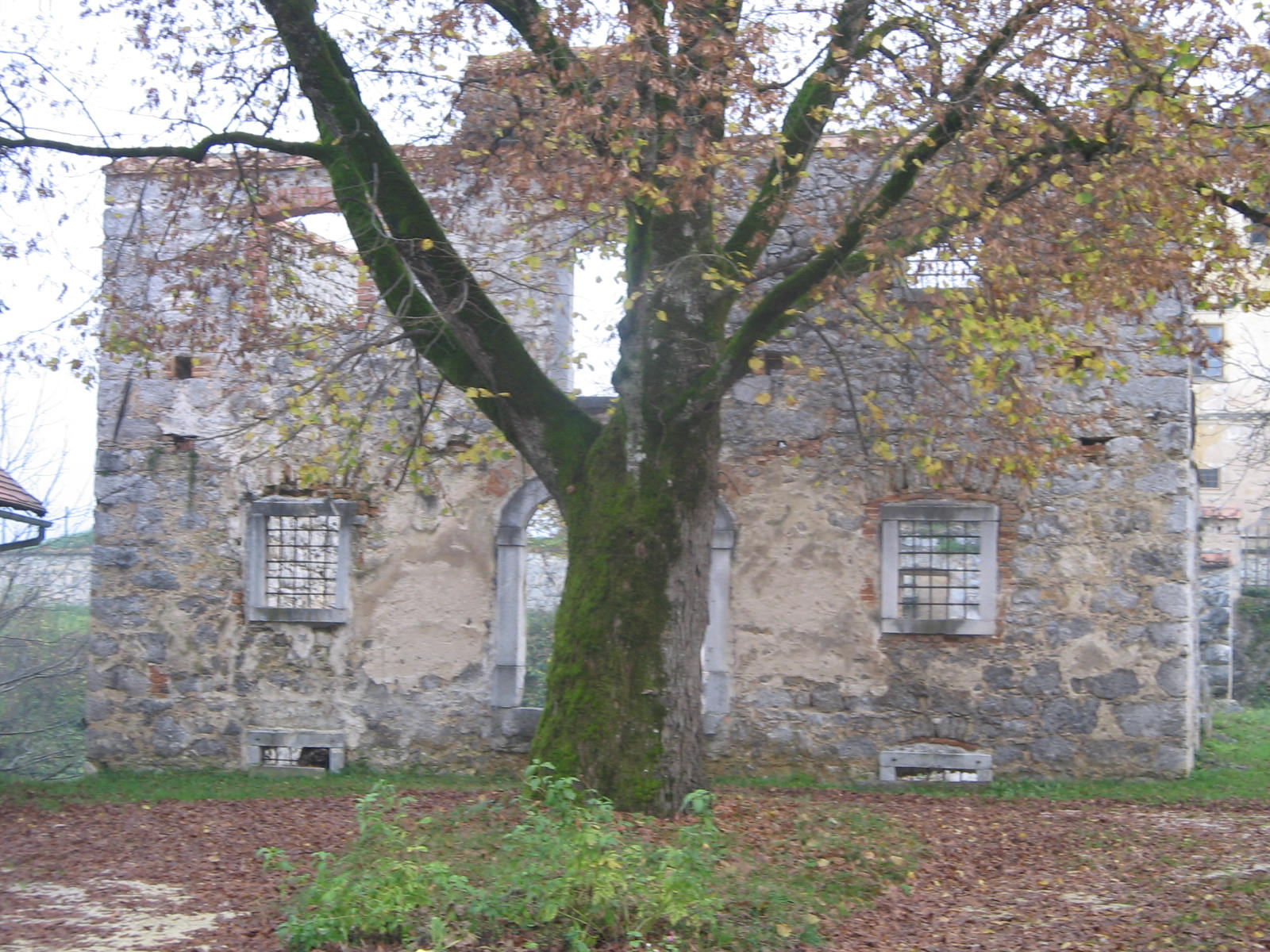
Housekeeping building
