= Malo Lipje =

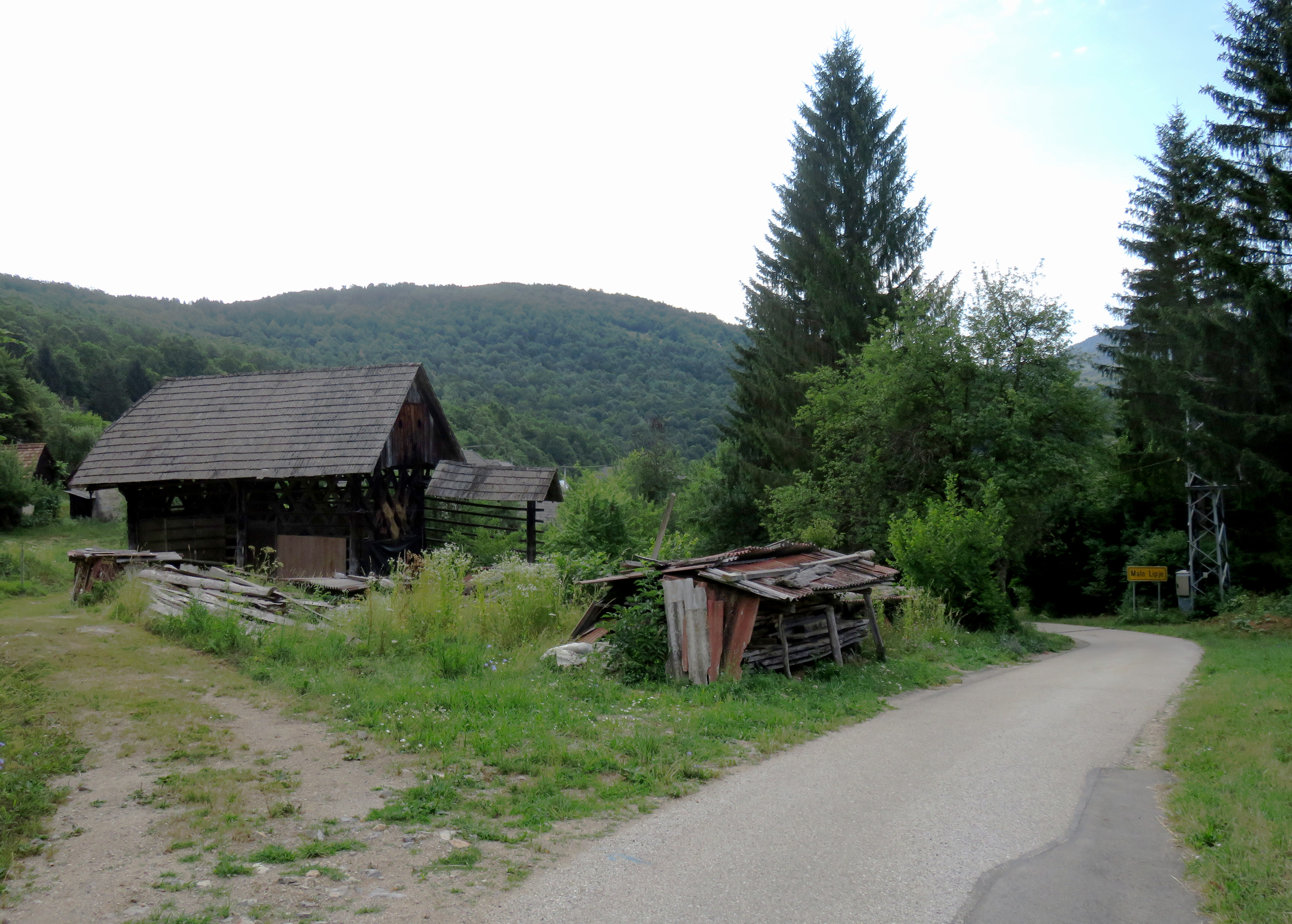

- Location in Slovenia
- Coordinates: 45°48′15.04″N 14°55′23.92″E
- Country: Slovenia
- Traditional region: Lower Carniola
- Statistical region: Southeast Slovenia
- Municipality: Žužemberk

Area
  - Total: 1.92 km^{2} (0.74 sq mi)
- Elevation: 270.3 m (887 ft)

Population (2002)
  - Total: 28

Malo Lipje (pronounced [ˈmaːlɔ ˈliːpjɛ]; German: Kleinliplach) is a small settlement in the Municipality of Žužemberk in the historical region of Lower Carniola in southeastern Slovenia. The municipality is included in the Southeast Slovenia Statistical Region.

== Name ==
The name Malo Lipje literally means 'little Lipje' (in contrast to the neighboring village of Veliko Lipje 'big Lipje'). The name is derived from a demonym (originally plural, *Lipľane 'residents of Lipa'), ultimately from the common noun lipa 'linden', referring to the local vegetation.
