= Hrašče, Vipava =

Hrašče
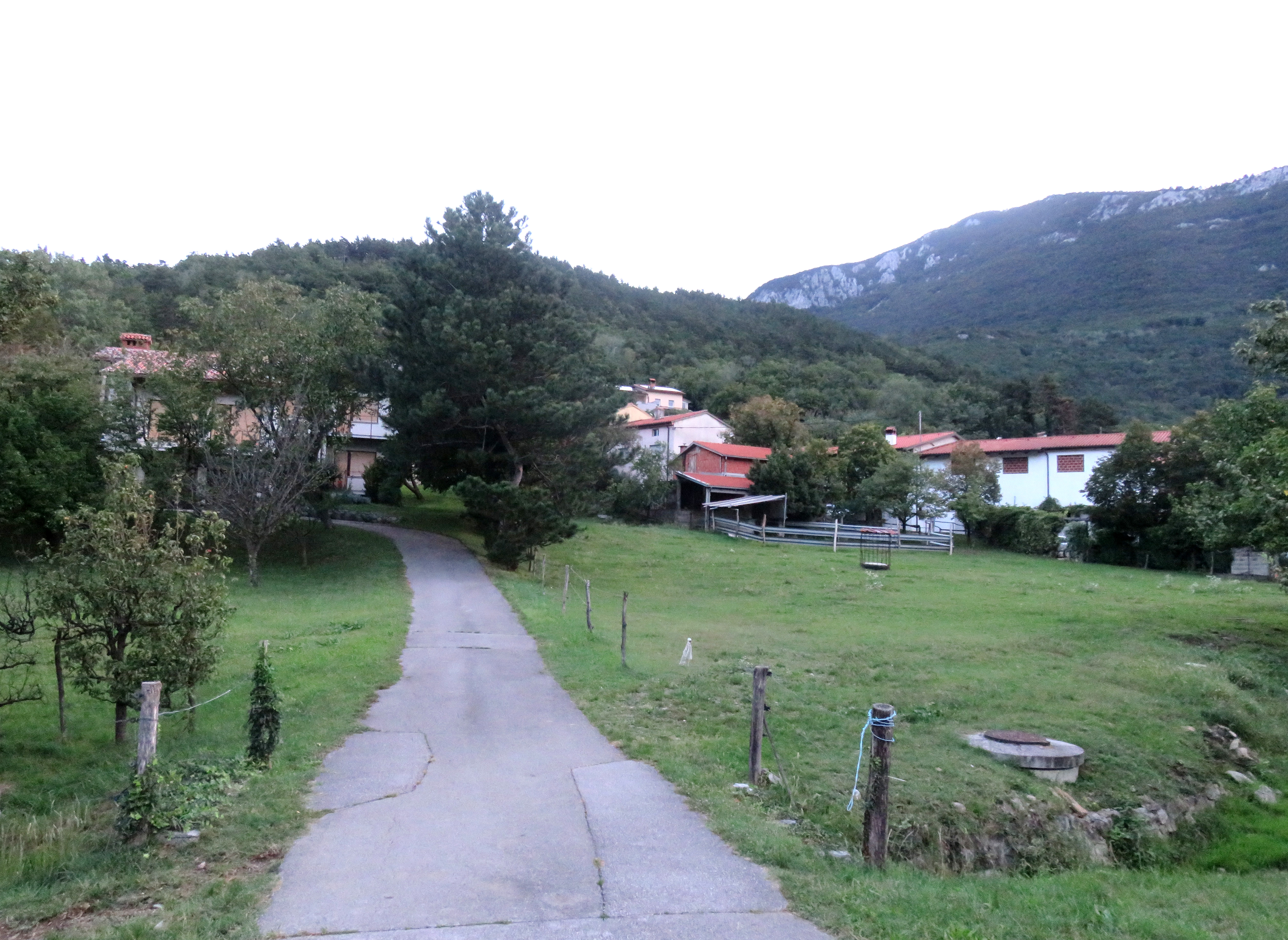

- Location in Slovenia
- Coordinates: 45°47′48.94″N 13°59′8.9″E
- Country: Slovenia
- Traditional region: Littoral
- Statistical region: Gorizia
- Municipality: Vipava

Area
  - Total: 1.24 km^{2} (0.48 sq mi)
- Elevation: 228.9 m (751 ft)

Population (2002)
  - Total: 66

Hrašče (pronounced [ˈxɾaːʃtʃɛ]) is a small village in the upper Vipava Valley, on the western slopes of Mount Nanos, in the Municipality of Vipava in the Littoral region of Slovenia.
