= Hrustovo, Velike Lašče =

Hrustovo
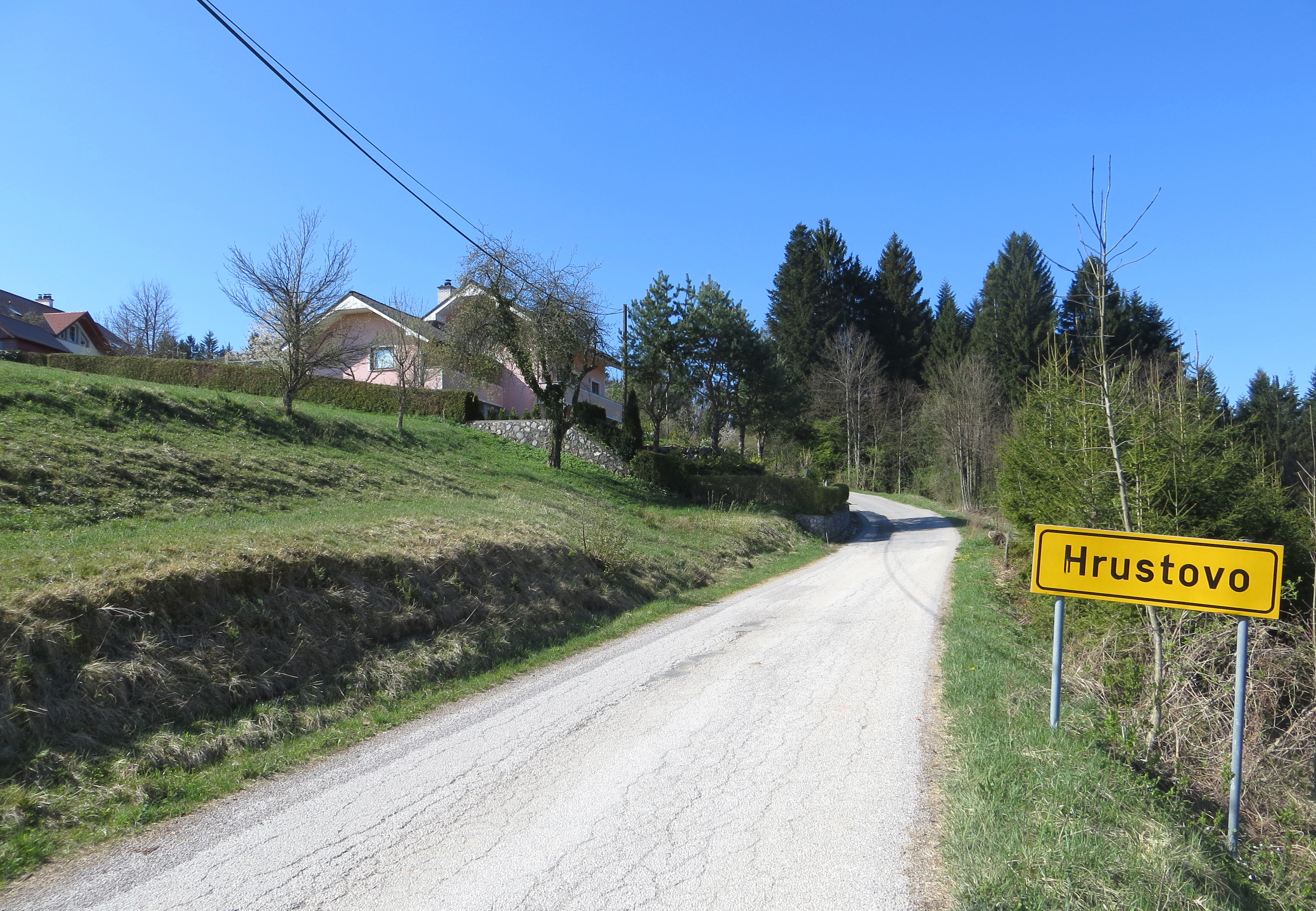

- Location in Slovenia
- Coordinates: 45°50′25.52″N 14°36′22.71″E
- Country: Slovenia
- Traditional region: Lower Carniola
- Statistical region: Central Slovenia
- Municipality: Velike Lašče

Area
  - Total: 0.43 km^{2} (0.17 sq mi)
- Elevation: 545.8 m (1,791 ft)

Population (2002)
  - Total: 33
- Postal code: 1315

Hrustovo (pronounced [ˈxɾuːstɔʋɔ]; German: Hrustou) is a small settlement west of Velike Lašče in central Slovenia. The entire Municipality of Velike Lašče is part of the traditional region of Lower Carniola and is now included in the Central Slovenia Statistical Region.
