= Hraše, Medvode =

Hraše
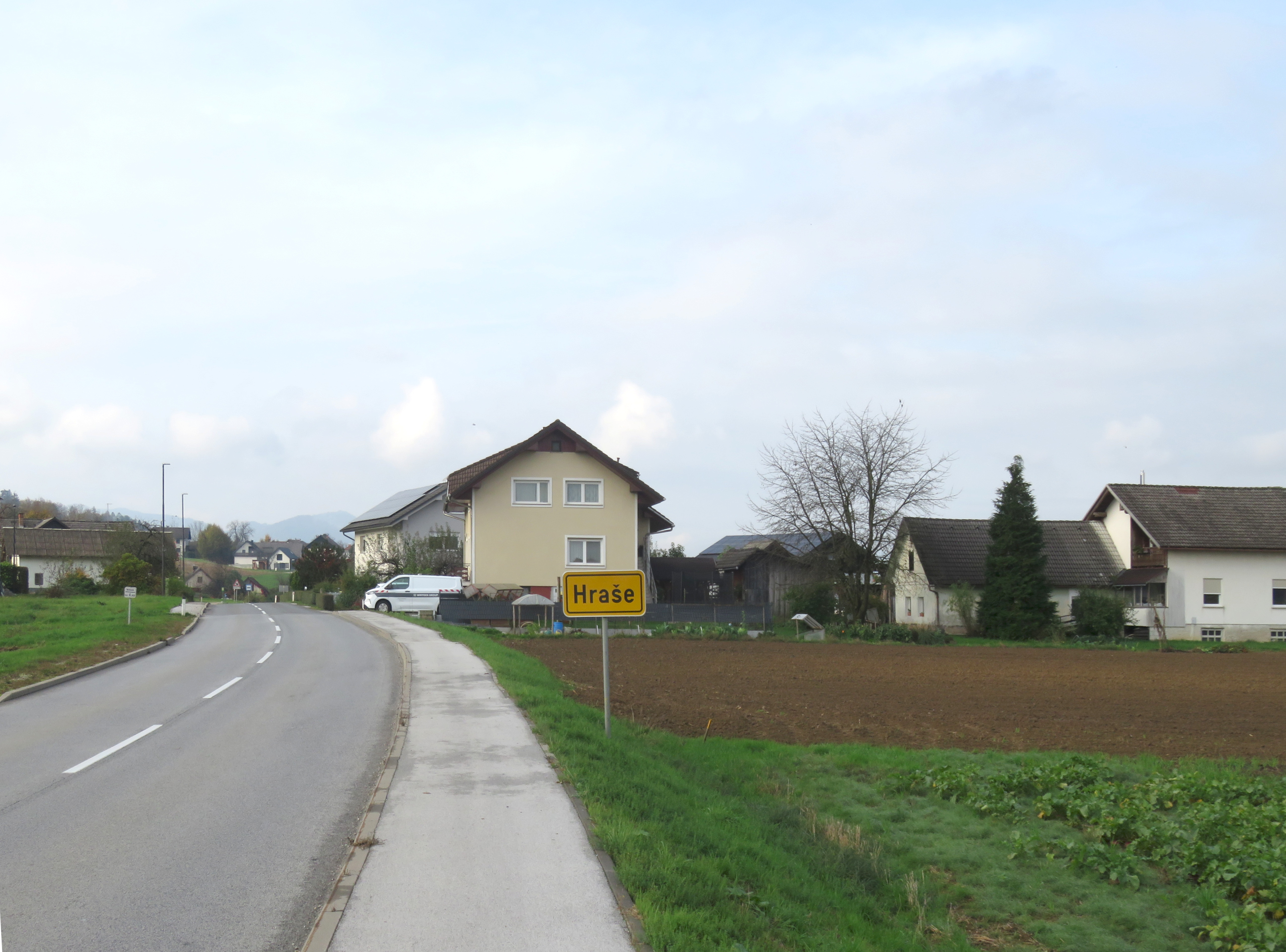

- Location in Slovenia
- Coordinates: 46°10′28.83″N 14°26′59.81″E
- Country: Slovenia
- Traditional region: Upper Carniola
- Statistical region: Central Slovenia
- Municipality: Medvode

Area
  - Total: 3.71 km^{2} (1.43 sq mi)
- Elevation: 348.1 m (1,142 ft)

Population (2002)
  - Total: 409

Hraše (pronounced [ˈxɾaːʃɛ]; German: Hrasche) is a settlement in the Municipality of Medvode in the Upper Carniola region of Slovenia.

== Name ==
Hraše was first attested in written sources in 1118 as Grasach (and as Grosschach in 1436 and Krasach and Chrasach in 1499). These are all locative forms of the name. The name Hraše is derived from the plural demonym *Hrasťane, in turn derived from the word hrast 'oak'. Like similar names (e.g., Hrastje, Hrastovica, Hrastnik), it originally referred to the local vegetation. In the past the German name was Hrasche.

== Church ==
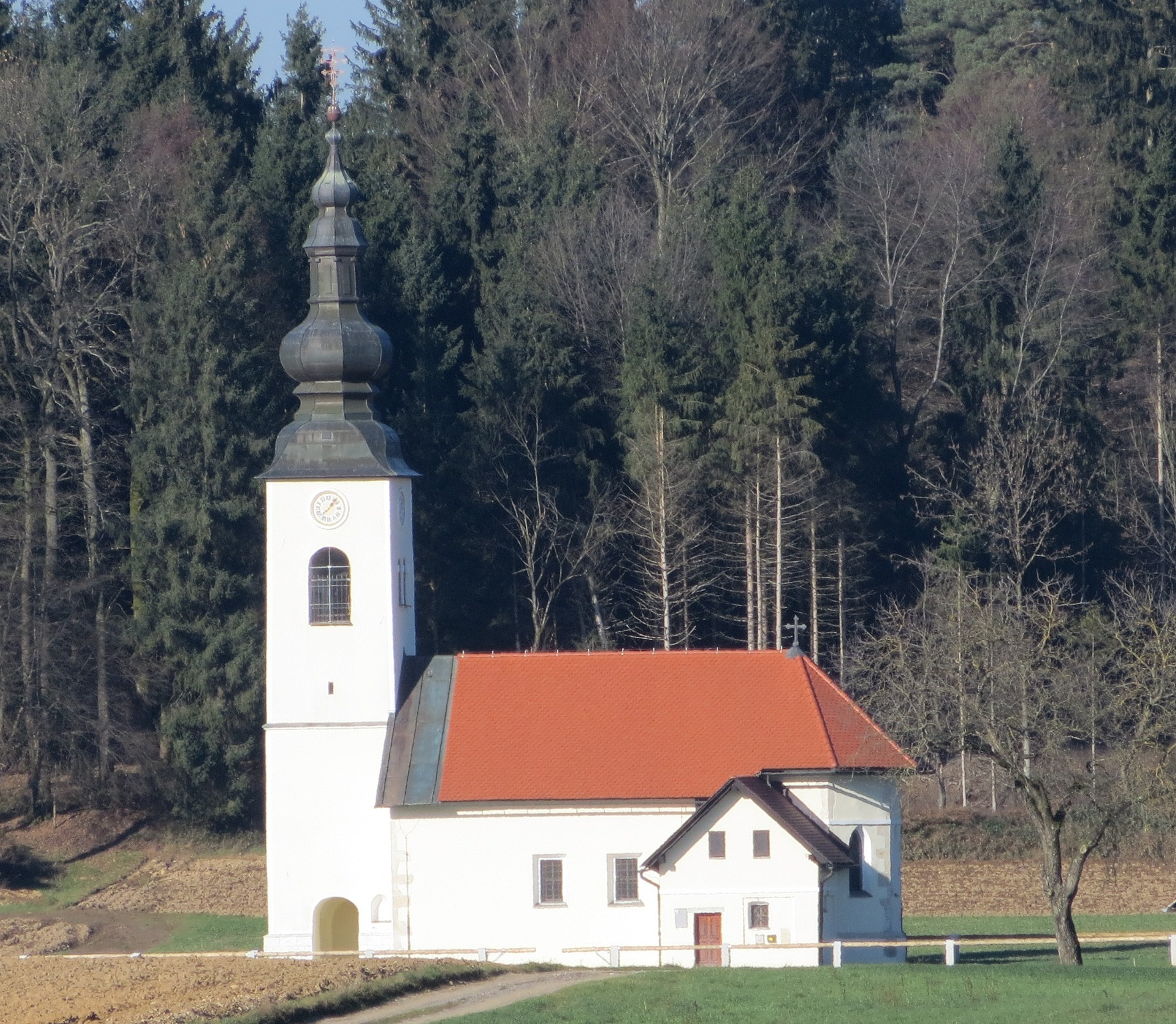
Saint James' Church

The local church, built outside the main settlement, is dedicated to Saint James. It was first mentioned in documents dating to 1118, when it was granted baptism and burial rights. The current building dates to the late 15th century but was later remodelled in the Baroque fashion. The nave is rib vaulted and the sanctuary ceiling has a star vault. The main altar dates to 1647. The side altars are dedicated to Saint Anne and Saint Anthony the Hermit.
