= Hinje, Žužemberk =

Hinje
- Village
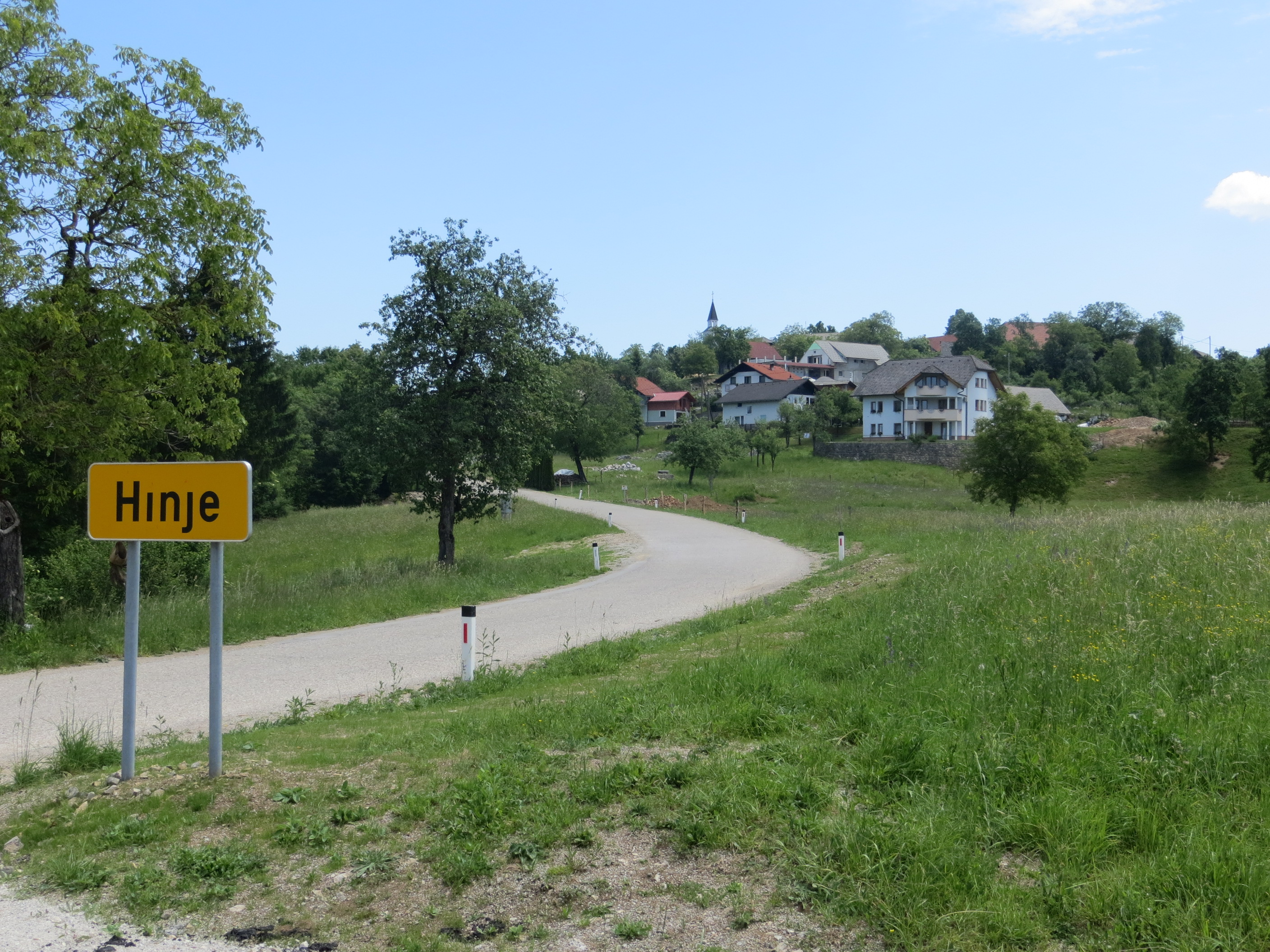

- Location in Slovenia
- Coordinates: 45°45′58.56″N 14°53′10.34″E
- Country: Slovenia
- Traditional region: Lower Carniola
- Statistical region: Southeast Slovenia
- Municipality: Žužemberk

Area
  - Total: 4.71 km^{2} (1.82 sq mi)
- Elevation: 518.6 m (1,701 ft)

Population (2012)
  - Total: 70
  - Density: 15/km^{2} (39/sq mi)

Hinje (pronounced [ˈxiːnjɛ]; German: Hinnach) is a small village in the Municipality of Žužemberk in southeastern Slovenia. The area is part of the historical region of Lower Carniola. The municipality is now included in the Southeast Slovenia Statistical Region.

== Name ==
Hinje was attested in written sources in 1372 as Bechyn (and as Hynoch in 1382 and Pchin in 1422). The name is derived from *Bhinje or *Bihinje, likely derived from the plural demonym *Byxyn′ane based on the hydronym *Byxyn′a (which yielded the name of Hinja Creek near Hinje in the Municipality of Sevnica). The first unaccented syllable was lost through modern vowel reduction. The name therefore means 'people living along Hinja Creek' and may refer to settlers from the Hinja Creek area that moved to Hinje in the Municipality of Žužemberk. The village was known as Hinnach in German in the past.

== Parish church ==
The local parish church is dedicated to the Annunciation of the Blessed Virgin Mary and belongs to the Roman Catholic Diocese of Novo Mesto. The church, originally erected around 1800, was burned in January 1945, during World War II, by the Slovene Partisans, and rebuilt only in 1971. It was reconsecrated in 1972.

== Gallery ==
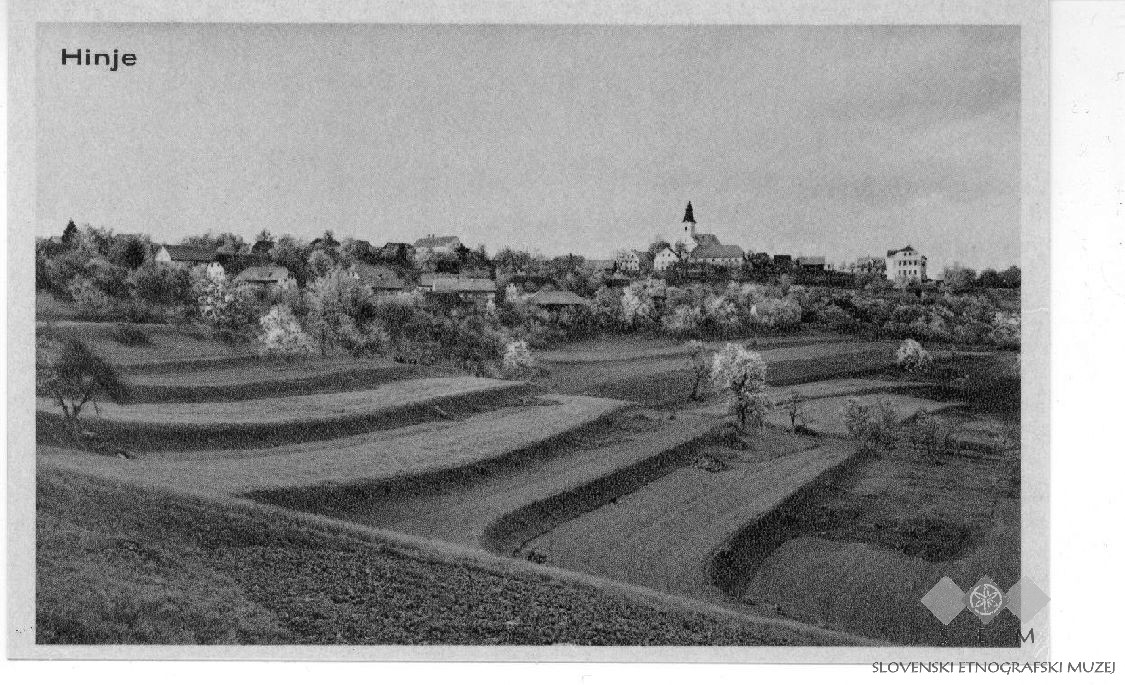
Postcard of Hinje before World War II
