= Hrastje, Šentjernej =

Hrastje
- Location in Slovenia
- Coordinates: 45°48′51.61″N 15°17′54.68″E
- Country: Slovenia
- Traditional region: Lower Carniola
- Statistical region: Southeast Slovenia
- Municipality: Šentjernej

Area
  - Total: 1.14 km^{2} (0.44 sq mi)
- Elevation: 238.2 m (781 ft)

Population (2002)
  - Total: 95
- Postal code: 8310

Hrastje (pronounced [ˈxɾaːstjɛ]) is a small settlement in the foothills of the Gorjanci Mountains in the Municipality of Šentjernej in southeastern Slovenia. The area is part of the traditional region of Lower Carniola. It is now included in the Southeast Slovenia Statistical Region.

== Name ==
The name Hrastje is derived from the Slovene common noun hrast 'oak', referring to the local vegetation.

== Castle ==
Gracar Turn is a 14th-century castle on the northern outskirts of the village.
