= Podpeč =

Podpeč may refer to several places in Slovenia:

- Podpeč, Brezovica, a settlement in the Municipality of Brezovica
- Podpeč, Dobrepolje, a settlement in the Municipality of Dobrepolje
- Podpeč, Koper, a settlement in the Municipality of Koper
- Podpeč nad Marofom, a settlement in the Municipality of Šentjur
- Podpeč ob Dravinji, a settlement in the Municipality of Slovenske Konjice
- Podpeč pod Skalo, a former settlement in the Municipality of Litija
- Podpeč pri Šentvidu, a settlement in the Municipality of Šentjur
