= Planinca, Šentjur =

Planinca
- Location in Slovenia
- Coordinates: 46°10′40.3″N 15°23′26.97″E
- Country: Slovenia
- Traditional region: Styria
- Statistical region: Savinja
- Municipality: Šentjur

Area
  - Total: 1.16 km^{2} (0.45 sq mi)
- Elevation: 371 m (1,217 ft)

Population (2020)
  - Total: 50
  - Density: 43/km^{2} (110/sq mi)

Planinca (pronounced [plaˈniːntsa]) is a small settlement in the Municipality of Šentjur in eastern Slovenia. It lies in the hills south of Jakob pri Šentjurju, just off the road towards Kalobje. The settlement, and the entire municipality, are included in the Savinja Statistical Region, which is in the Slovenian portion of the historical Duchy of Styria.
