= Turno (disambiguation) =

Turno was a political arrangement in late–19th century and early–20th century Spain. Other uses include:

- Turno, Lublin Voivodeship, Poland
- Turno, Šentjur, Slovenia
- Turno (musician) (active since 2016), English musician
