= Dole, Šentjur =

Dole
- Location in Slovenia
- Coordinates: 46°14′16.99″N 15°23′0.78″E
- Country: Slovenia
- Traditional region: Styria
- Statistical region: Savinja
- Municipality: Šentjur

Area
  - Total: 1.05 km^{2} (0.41 sq mi)
- Elevation: 267.6 m (878 ft)

Population (2020)
  - Total: 158
  - Density: 150/km^{2} (390/sq mi)

Dole (pronounced [ˈdoːlɛ]) is a settlement in the Municipality of Šentjur, in eastern Slovenia. It lies on the road leading north from the town of Šentjur towards Dramlje. The settlement and the entire municipality are included in the Savinja Statistical Region, which is in the Slovenian portion of the historical Duchy of Styria.

== History ==
Dole was formerly a hamlet of Trnovec pri Dramljah. It was administratively separated from that settlement and became a separate settlement in 1994.
