= Vrbno =

Vrbno may refer to:

- Vrbno pod Pradědem, a town in the Czech Republic
- Vrbno nad Lesy, a municipality and village in the Czech Republic
- Vrbno (Hořín), a village and part of Hořín in the Czech Republic
- Vrbno, Šentjur, a village in Slovenia
- Vrbno, Croatia, a village near Bednja, Varaždin County, Croatia
