= Šibenik (disambiguation) =

Šibenik is a city in Dalmatia, Croatia.

Šibenik may also refer to:

- Šibenik, Šentjur, a village in Slovenia
- Šibenik (mountain), a mountain in Croatia
- HNK Šibenik, the Croatian football club from the city of Šibenik
- Šibenik (RTOP-21), a Croatian Končar-class missile boat

Sibenik may also refer to:

- Sibenik, Bjelovar-Bilogora County, a village in Croatia
