= Sveti Ožbalt =

Sveti Ožbalt may refer to several places in Slovenia:

- Ožbalt, a settlement in the Municipality of Podvelka, known as Sveti Ožbalt until 1952
- Podgaj, Šentjur, a settlement in the Municipality of Šentjur, known as Sveti Ožbalt until 1955
