= Žegar =

Žegar may refer to:

- Žegar, Šentjur, a village in Slovenia
- Žegar, Bukovica, a historical settlement in Bukovica, Croatia
