= Sveti Primož =

Sveti Primož may refer to several places in Slovenia:

- Primož pri Ljubnem, a settlement in the Municipality of Ljubno, known as Sveti Primož until 1955
- Primož pri Šentjurju, a settlement in the Municipality of Šentjur, known as Sveti Primož until 1955
- Primož, Sevnica, a settlement in the Municipality of Sevnica, known as Sveti Primož until 1955
- Sveti Primož na Pohorju, a settlement in the Municipality of Vuzenica
- Sveti Primož nad Muto, a settlement in the Municipality of Muta
