= Dobje =

Dobje can refer to each of following places in Slovenia:

- Dobje pri Lesičnem, Municipality of Šentjur pri Celju
- Dobje pri Planini, Municipality of Dobje
- Dobje, Gorenja Vas–Poljane, Municipality of Gorenja Vas–Poljane
- Dobje, Grosuplje, Municipality of Grosuplje
- Dobje, Litija, Municipality of Litija
- Municipality of Dobje
