= Šedem =

- Location in Slovenia
- Coordinates: 46°2′22.4″N 15°27′33.95″E
- Country: Slovenia
- Traditional region: Styria
- Statistical region: Lower Sava
- Municipality: Krško

Area
  - Total: 1.85 km^{2} (0.71 sq mi)
- Elevation: 423.2 m (1,388 ft)

Population (2002)
  - Total: 138
- Postal code: 8281

Šedem (pronounced [ˈʃeːdəm]. in older sources also Šedun, German: Schedun) is a settlement in the hills northwest of Senovo in the Municipality of Krško in eastern Slovenia. The area is part of the traditional region of Styria. It is now included with the rest of the municipality in the Lower Sava Statistical Region.

== Name ==
Šedem was attested in historical sources as Scheding in 1322, and as Schedeim and Schedun in 1342. Like related names such as Ščedem (German: Tschedram), Šedina, and Škedenj (Italian: Servola), the name Šedem developed from the present passive participle *ščędimъ 'being protected', probably in the sense of 'protected forest' (where cutting wood and hunting were not permitted).
