= Lokarje =

- Location in Slovenia
- Coordinates: 46°13′57.51″N 15°23′12.32″E
- Country: Slovenia
- Traditional region: Styria
- Statistical region: Savinja
- Municipality: Šentjur

Area
  - Total: 1.31 km^{2} (0.51 sq mi)
- Elevation: 272.8 m (895 ft)

Population (2020)
  - Total: 115
  - Density: 87.8/km^{2} (227/sq mi)

Lokarje (pronounced [lɔˈkaːɾjɛ]) is a village in the Municipality of Šentjur, eastern Slovenia. It lies just off the regional road leading north out of the town of Šentjur towards Dramlje. The settlement, and the entire municipality, are included in the Savinja Statistical Region, which is in the Slovenian portion of the historical Duchy of Styria.
