= Javorje, Šentjur =

Javorje
- Location in Slovenia
- Coordinates: 46°10′31″N 15°27′03″E
- Country: Slovenia
- Traditional region: Styria
- Statistical region: Savinja
- Municipality: Šentjur

Area
  - Total: 2.6 km^{2} (1.0 sq mi)
- Elevation: 473 m (1,552 ft)

Population (2020)
  - Total: 187
  - Density: 72/km^{2} (190/sq mi)

Javorje (pronounced [ˈjaːʋɔɾjɛ]) is a settlement in the Municipality of Šentjur, in eastern Slovenia. The settlement, and the entire municipality, are included in the Savinja Statistical Region, which is in the Slovenian portion of the historical Duchy of Styria.

The local church is dedicated to Saint Helena and belongs to the Parish of Slivnica pri Celju. It dates to the late 15th century.
