= Vodice pri Kalobju =

- Location in Slovenia
- Coordinates: 46°8′21.24″N 15°21′50.74″E
- Country: Slovenia
- Traditional region: Styria
- Statistical region: Savinja
- Municipality: Šentjur

Area
  - Total: 2.51 km^{2} (0.97 sq mi)
- Elevation: 520.1 m (1,706 ft)

Population (2020)
  - Total: 68
  - Density: 27/km^{2} (70/sq mi)

Vodice pri Kalobju (pronounced [ʋɔˈdiːtsɛ pɾi ˈkaːlɔbju]) is a dispersed settlement in the Municipality of Šentjur, eastern Slovenia. Vodice pri Kalobju lies in the Sava Hills, on the western edge of the municipality. The settlement, and the entire municipality, are included in the Savinja Statistical Region, which is in the Slovenian portion of the historical Duchy of Styria.

== Name ==
The name of the settlement was changed from Vodice to Vodice pri Kalobju in 1953.
