= Tratna ob Voglajni =

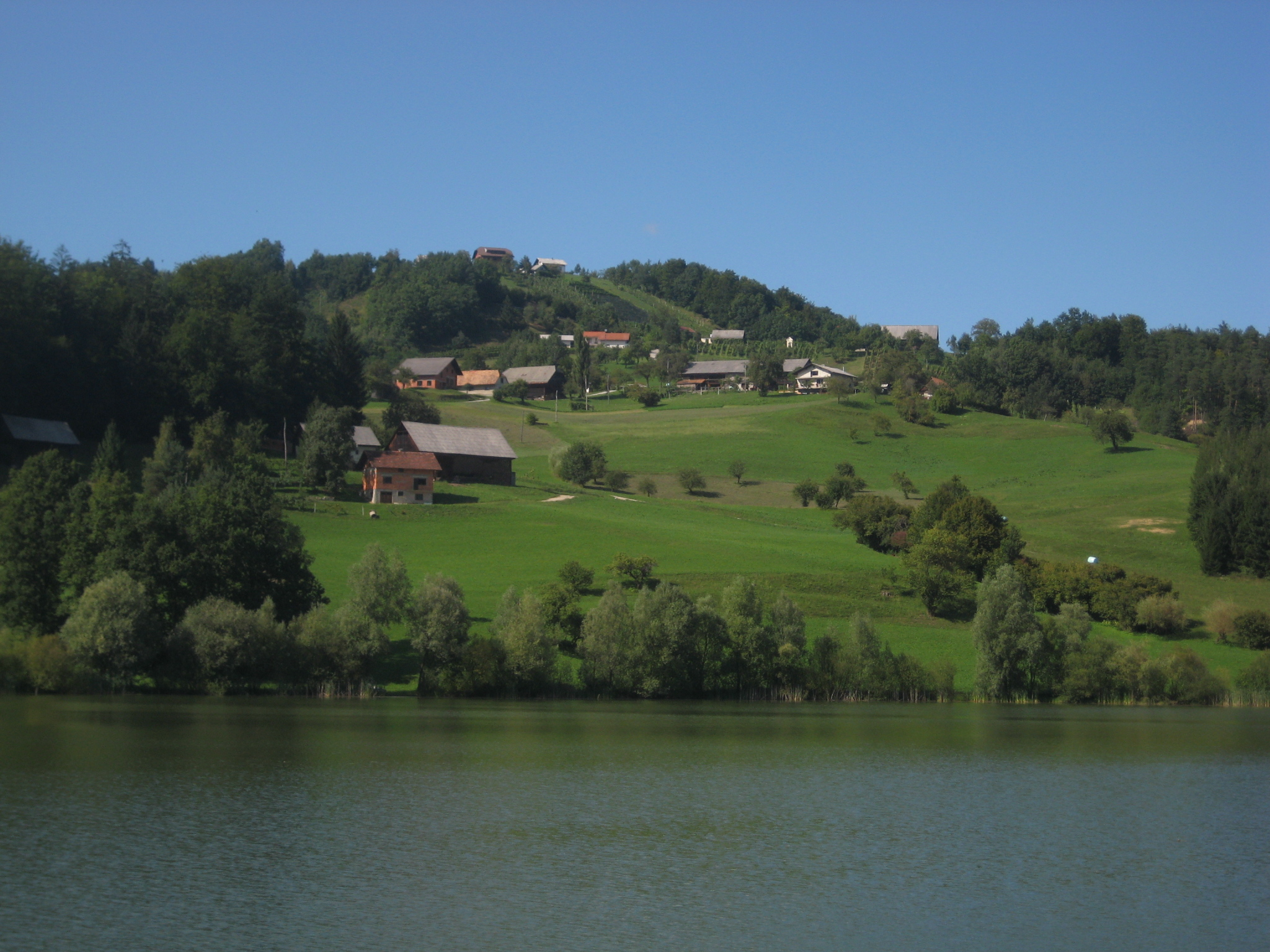

- Location in Slovenia
- Coordinates: 46°11′32.23″N 15°26′55.17″E
- Country: Slovenia
- Traditional region: Styria
- Statistical region: Savinja
- Municipality: Šentjur

Area
  - Total: 1.66 km^{2} (0.64 sq mi)
- Elevation: 331.5 m (1,088 ft)

Population (2020)
  - Total: 17
  - Density: 10/km^{2} (27/sq mi)

Tratna ob Voglajni (pronounced [ˈtɾaːtna ɔp ʋɔˈɡlaːi̯ni]) is a small settlement in the Municipality of Šentjur, eastern Slovenia. Tratna ob Voglajni lies on the northern shore of Lake Slivnica, east of Gorica pri Slivnici. The settlement, and the entire municipality, are included in the Savinja Statistical Region, which is in the Slovenian portion of the historical Duchy of Styria.

== Name ==
The name of the settlement was changed from Tratna to Tratna ob Voglajni in 1953.
