= Repno, Šentjur =

Repno
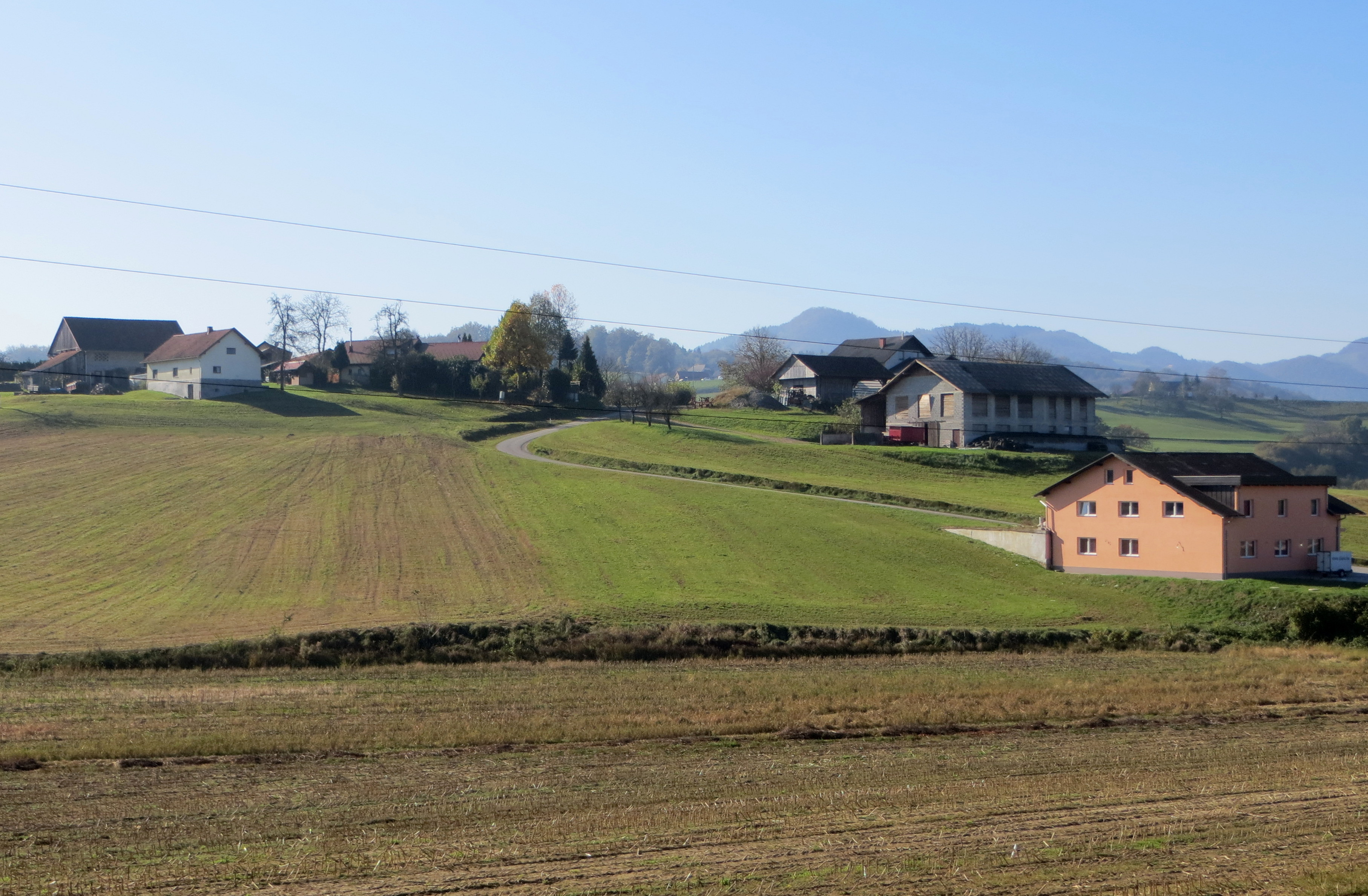

- Location in Slovenia
- Coordinates: 46°14′2.83″N 15°22′33.15″E
- Country: Slovenia
- Traditional region: Styria
- Statistical region: Savinja
- Municipality: Šentjur

Area
  - Total: 0.65 km^{2} (0.25 sq mi)
- Elevation: 301 m (988 ft)

Population (2020)
  - Total: 62
  - Density: 95/km^{2} (250/sq mi)

Repno (pronounced [ˈɾeːpnɔ]) is a small settlement in the Municipality of Šentjur, eastern Slovenia. Repno lies northwest of the town of Šentjur. The settlement, and the entire municipality, are included in the Savinja Statistical Region, which is in the Slovenian portion of the historical Duchy of Styria.
