= Botričnica =

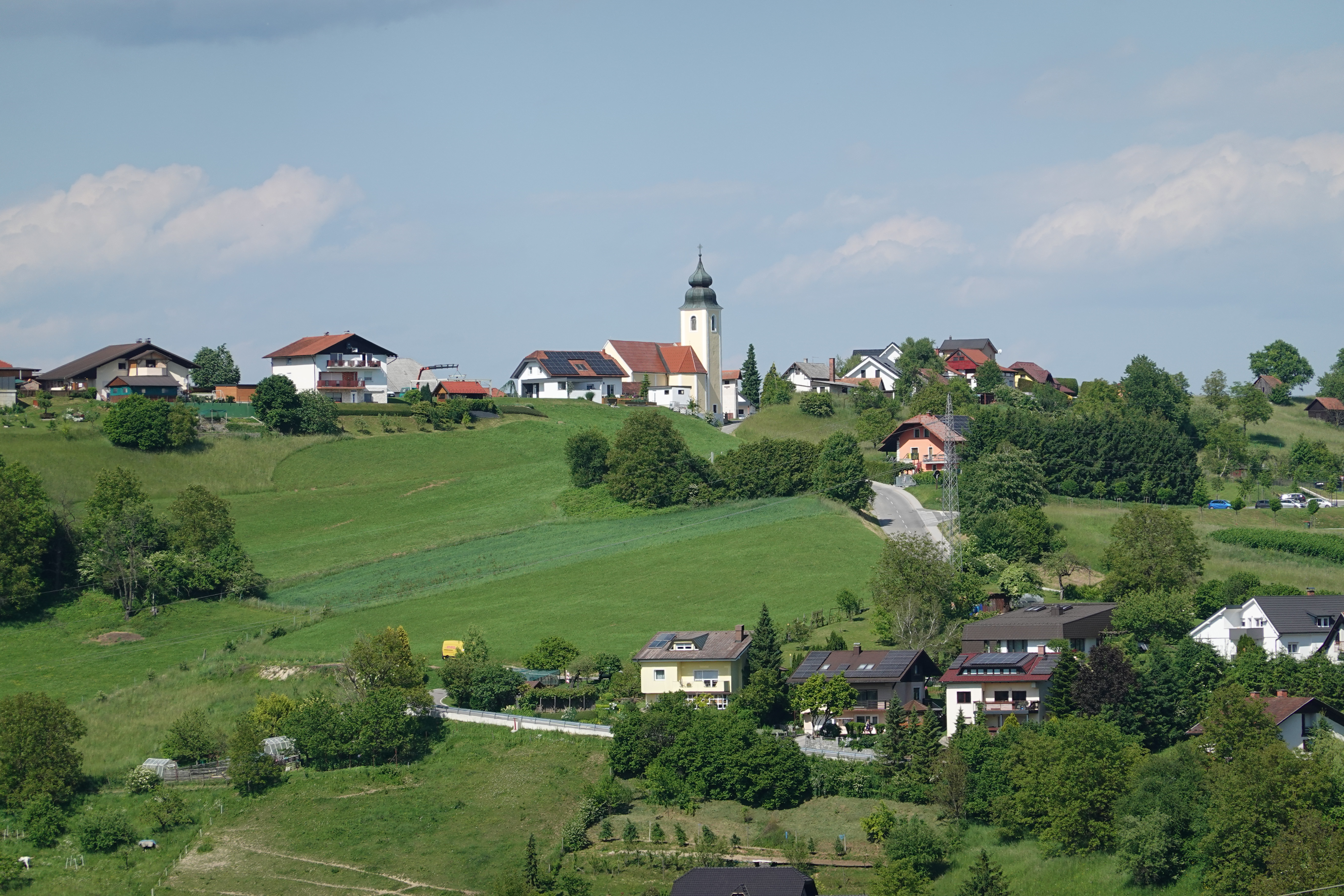

- Location in Slovenia
- Coordinates: 46°13′39.21″N 15°23′59.79″E
- Country: Slovenia
- Traditional region: Styria
- Statistical region: Savinja
- Municipality: Šentjur

Area
  - Total: 0.62 km^{2} (0.24 sq mi)
- Elevation: 330.4 m (1,084 ft)

Population (2020)
  - Total: 165
  - Density: 270/km^{2} (690/sq mi)

Botričnica (pronounced [bɔˈtɾiːtʃnitsa]) is a settlement in the Municipality of Šentjur, in Eastern Slovenia. It lies north of the town of Šentjur. The settlement, and the entire municipality, are included in the Savinja Statistical Region, which is in the Slovenian portion of the historical Duchy of Styria.

The local church is dedicated to Mary of the Seven Sorrows and belongs to the Parish of Šentjur. It was built in 1736.
