= Srževica =

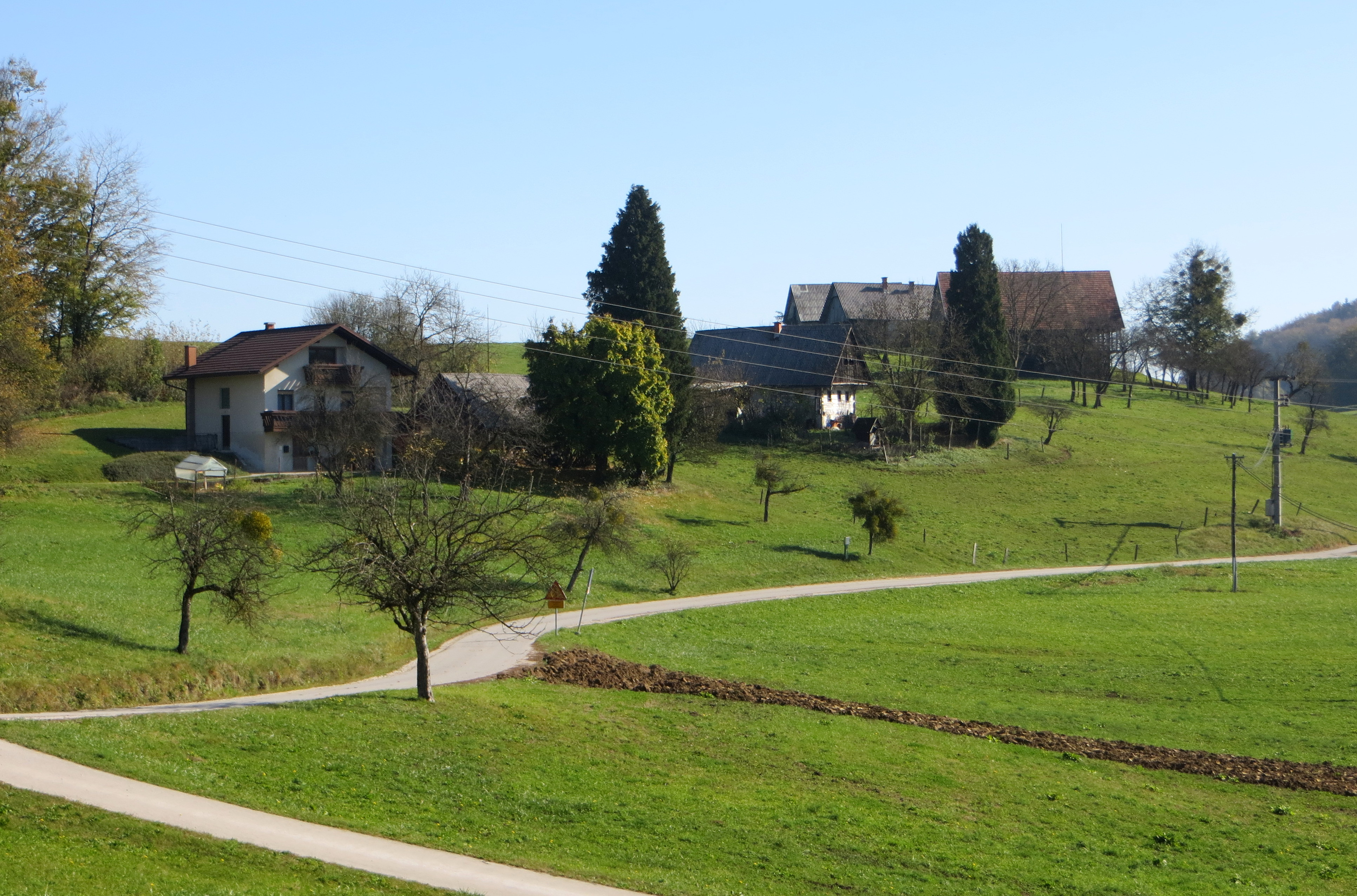

- Location in Slovenia
- Coordinates: 46°15′30.15″N 15°28′52.92″E
- Country: Slovenia
- Traditional region: Styria
- Statistical region: Savinja
- Municipality: Šentjur

Area
  - Total: 1.9 km^{2} (0.73 sq mi)
- Elevation: 391 m (1,283 ft)

Population (2020)
  - Total: 109
  - Density: 57/km^{2} (150/sq mi)

Srževica (pronounced [səɾʒɛˈʋiːtsa]) is a settlement in the Municipality of Šentjur, eastern Slovenia. It lies in the hills east of Ponikva. The railway line from Ljubljana to Maribor runs along the northern edge of the settlement's territory. The settlement, and the entire municipality, are included in the Savinja Statistical Region, which is in the Slovenian portion of the historical Duchy of Styria.
