= Straža na Gori =

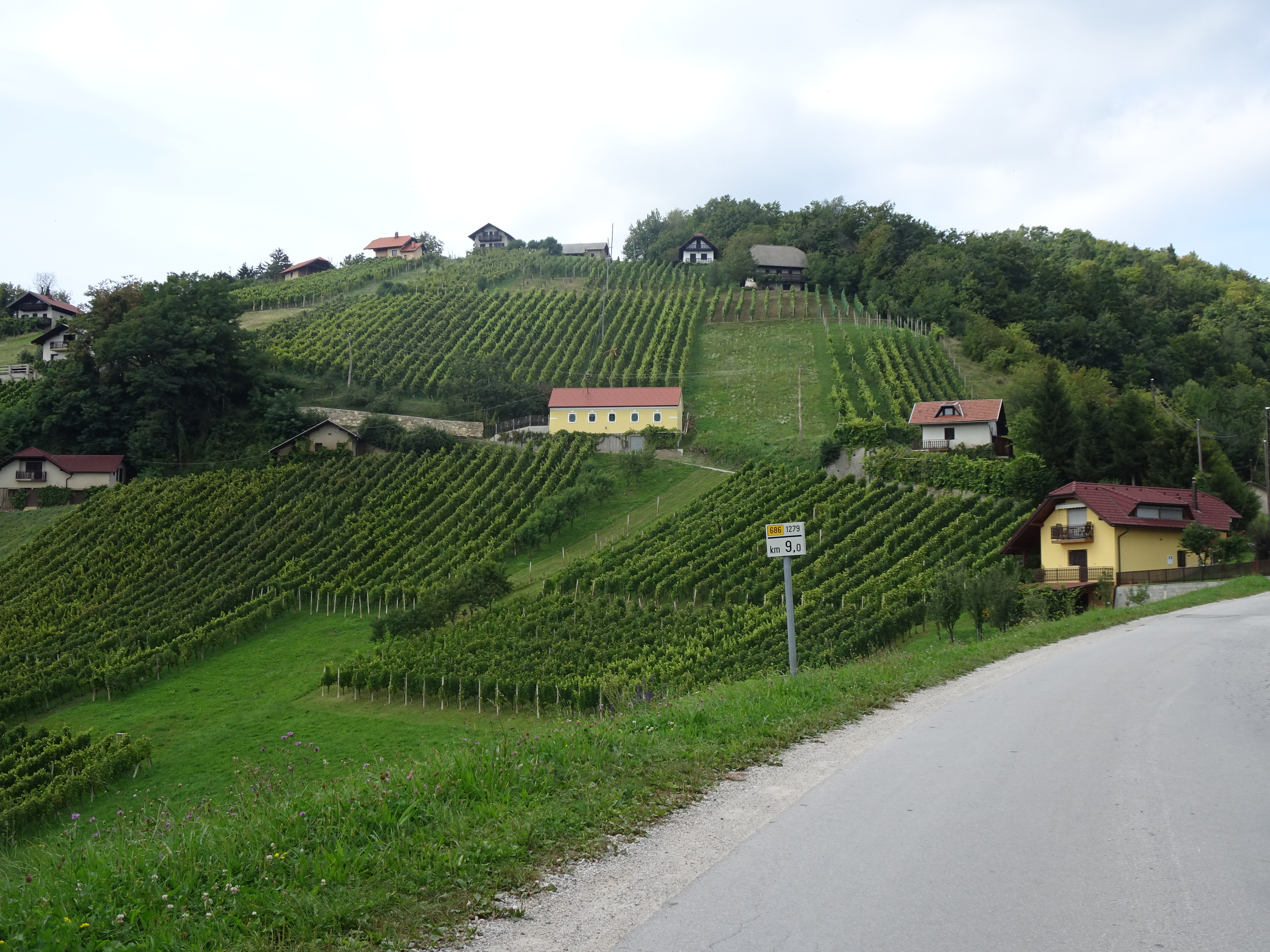

- Location in Slovenia
- Coordinates: 46°17′49.37″N 15°23′28.44″E
- Country: Slovenia
- Traditional region: Styria
- Statistical region: Savinja
- Municipality: Šentjur

Area
  - Total: 2.79 km^{2} (1.08 sq mi)
- Elevation: 461.5 m (1,514 ft)

Population (2020)
  - Total: 118
  - Density: 42.3/km^{2} (110/sq mi)

Straža na Gori (pronounced [ˈstɾaːʒa na ˈɡɔːɾi]) is a dispersed settlement in the hills north of Dramlje in the Municipality of Šentjur, eastern Slovenia. The settlement, and the entire municipality, are included in the Savinja Statistical Region, which is in the Slovenian portion of the historical Duchy of Styria.

== Name ==
The name of the settlement was changed from Straža to Straža na Gori in 1953.
