= Zgornje Slemene =

- Location in Slovenia
- Coordinates: 46°18′29.09″N 15°22′27.5″E
- Country: Slovenia
- Traditional region: Styria
- Statistical region: Savinja
- Municipality: Šentjur

Area
  - Total: 1.15 km^{2} (0.44 sq mi)
- Elevation: 561 m (1,841 ft)

Population (2020)
  - Total: 12
  - Density: 10/km^{2} (27/sq mi)

Zgornje Slemene (pronounced [ˈzɡoːɾnjɛ ˈsleːmɛnɛ]) is a small dispersed settlement in the Municipality of Šentjur, eastern Slovenia. It lies in the hills north of Dramlje. The settlement, and the entire municipality, are included in the Savinja Statistical Region, which is in the Slovenian portion of the historical Duchy of Styria.

As of 2020, its population of 12 makes it the least populous settlement in the Municipality of Šentjur.
