= Bukovje pri Slivnici =

- Location in Slovenia
- Coordinates: 46°10′3.81″N 15°26′54.44″E
- Country: Slovenia
- Traditional region: Styria
- Statistical region: Savinja
- Municipality: Šentjur

Area
  - Total: 2.24 km^{2} (0.86 sq mi)
- Elevation: 419.5 m (1,376 ft)

Population (2020)
  - Total: 158
  - Density: 70.5/km^{2} (183/sq mi)

Bukovje pri Slivnici (pronounced [ˈbuːkɔu̯jɛ pɾi ˈsliːu̯nitsi]) is a village in the Municipality of Šentjur, in eastern Slovenia. The settlement, and the entire municipality, are included in the Savinja Statistical Region, which is in the Slovenian portion of the historical Duchy of Styria.

== Name ==
The name of the settlement was changed from Bukovje to Bukovje pri Slivnici in 1953.

== Church ==
The local church is dedicated to Saint Nicholas and belongs to the Parish of Slivnica pri Celju. It dates to the late 17th century.
