= Golobinjek pri Planini =

- Location in Slovenia
- Coordinates: 46°5′31.1″N 15°23′52.98″E
- Country: Slovenia
- Traditional region: Styria
- Statistical region: Savinja
- Municipality: Šentjur

Area
  - Total: 2.14 km^{2} (0.83 sq mi)
- Elevation: 482.6 m (1,583 ft)

Population (2020)
  - Total: 41
  - Density: 19/km^{2} (50/sq mi)

Golobinjek pri Planini (pronounced [ɡɔlɔˈbiːnjɛk pɾi plaˈniːni]) is a small settlement south of Planina pri Sevnici in the Municipality of Šentjur, in eastern Slovenia. The settlement, and the entire municipality, are included in the Savinja Statistical Region, which is in the Slovenian portion of the historical Duchy of Styria.

== Name ==
The name of the settlement was changed from Golobinjek to Golobinjek pri Planini in 1953.
