= Črnolica =

- Location in Slovenia
- Coordinates: 46°11′54.58″N 15°25′31.85″E
- Country: Slovenia
- Traditional region: Styria
- Statistical region: Savinja
- Municipality: Šentjur

Area
  - Total: 1.32 km^{2} (0.51 sq mi)
- Elevation: 282.1 m (926 ft)

Population (2020)
  - Total: 39
  - Density: 30/km^{2} (77/sq mi)

Črnolica (pronounced [tʃəɾnɔˈliːtsa], German: Tschernolitza) is a settlement in the Municipality of Šentjur, in eastern Slovenia. It lies on the right bank of the Voglajna River, southeast of the town of Šentjur. The settlement, and the entire municipality, are included in the Savinja Statistical Region, which is in the Slovenian portion of the historical Duchy of Styria.
