= Vodule =

Vodule Sveta Uršula (until 1955)
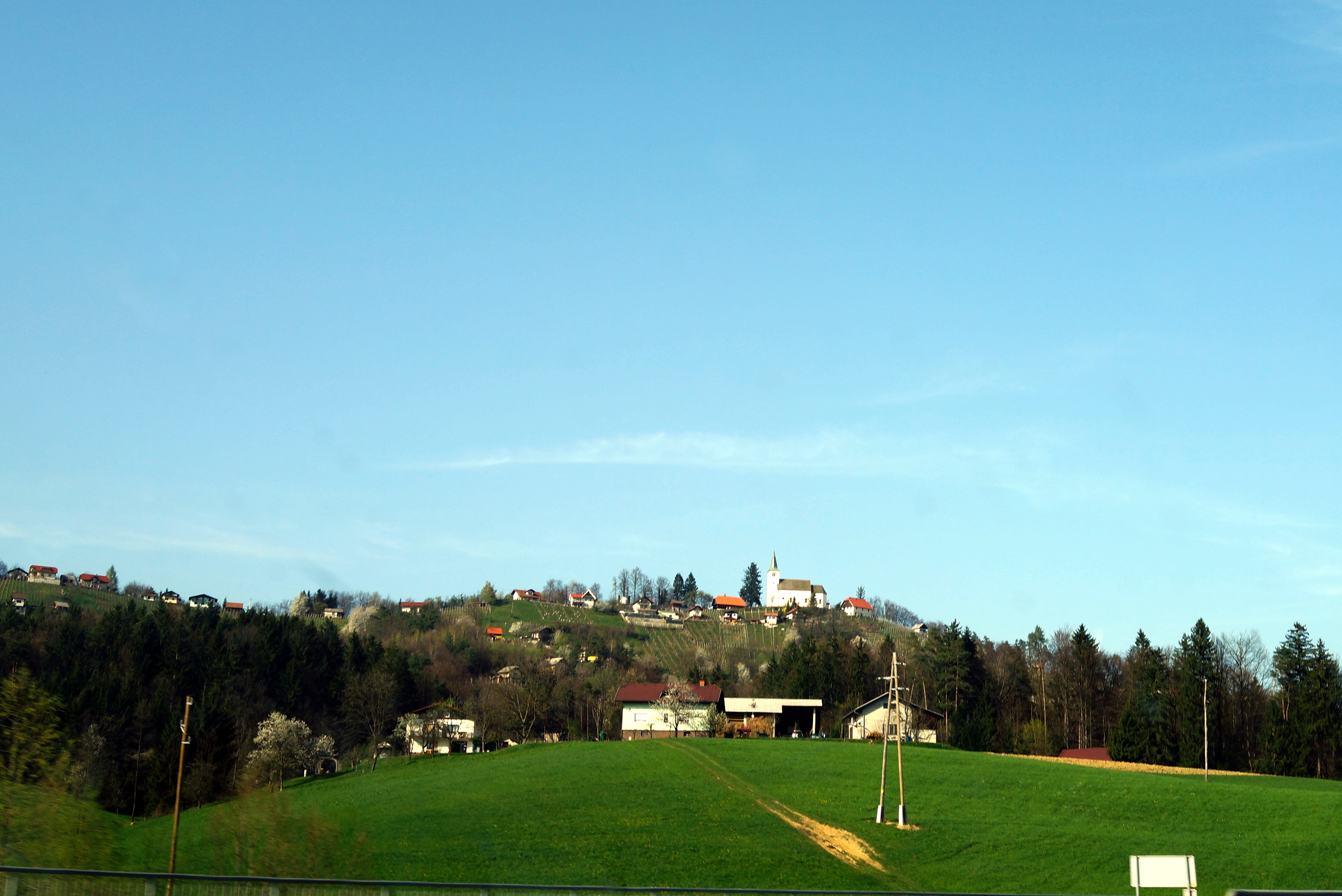

- Location in Slovenia
- Coordinates: 46°16′45.91″N 15°24′53.48″E
- Country: Slovenia
- Traditional region: Styria
- Statistical region: Savinja
- Municipality: Šentjur

Area
  - Total: 1.39 km^{2} (0.54 sq mi)
- Elevation: 400.7 m (1,315 ft)

Population (2020)
  - Total: 116
  - Density: 83.5/km^{2} (216/sq mi)

Vodule (pronounced [ˈʋoːdulɛ]) is a settlement in the Municipality of Šentjur in eastern Slovenia. It lies in the hills just east of Dramlje. The settlement, and the entire municipality, are included in the Savinja Statistical Region, which is in the Slovenian portion of the historical Duchy of Styria.

== Name ==
The name of the settlement was changed from Sveta Uršula (literally, 'Saint Ursula') to Vodule in 1955. The name was changed on the basis of the 1948 Law on Names of Settlements and Designations of Squares, Streets, and Buildings as part of efforts by Slovenia's postwar communist government to remove religious elements from toponyms. Before Vodule became the name of the entire settlement, the name used to refer to one of the hamlets in the settlement.

== Church ==
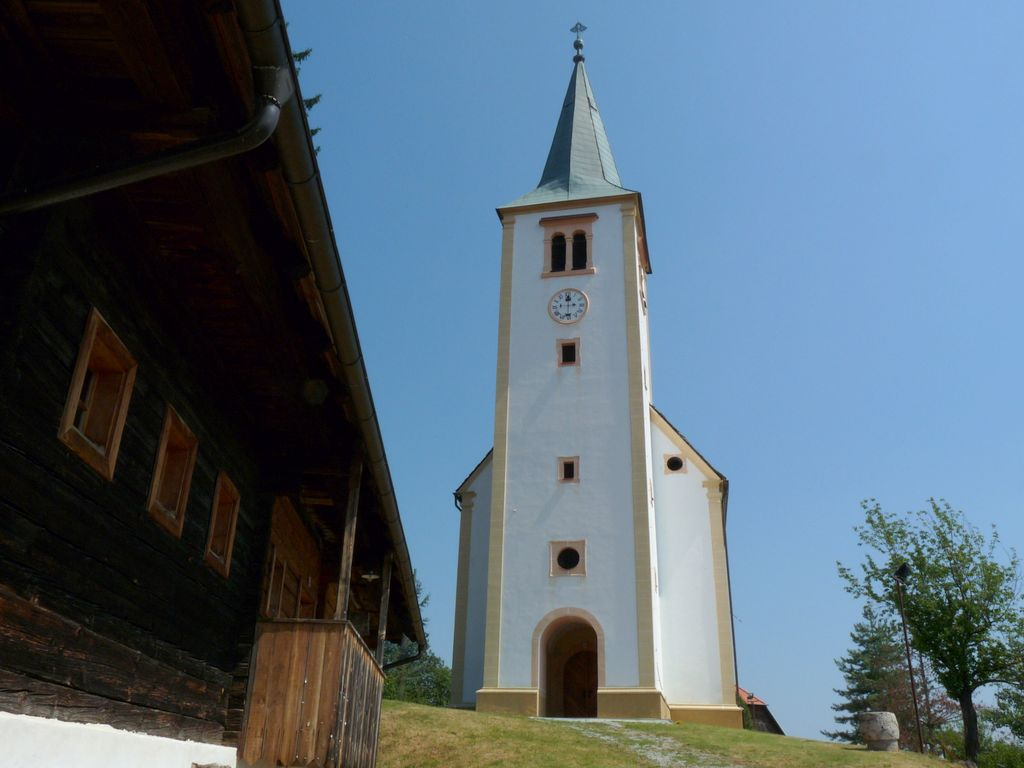
St. Ursula's Church

The local church is dedicated to Saint Ursula and belongs to the Parish of Dramlje. It dates to between 1650 and 1660.

== Notable people ==
Notable people that were born or lived in Vodule include:

- Matija Vodušek (1802–1872), religious writer, abbot, and colleague of Anton Martin Slomšek
