= Proseniško =

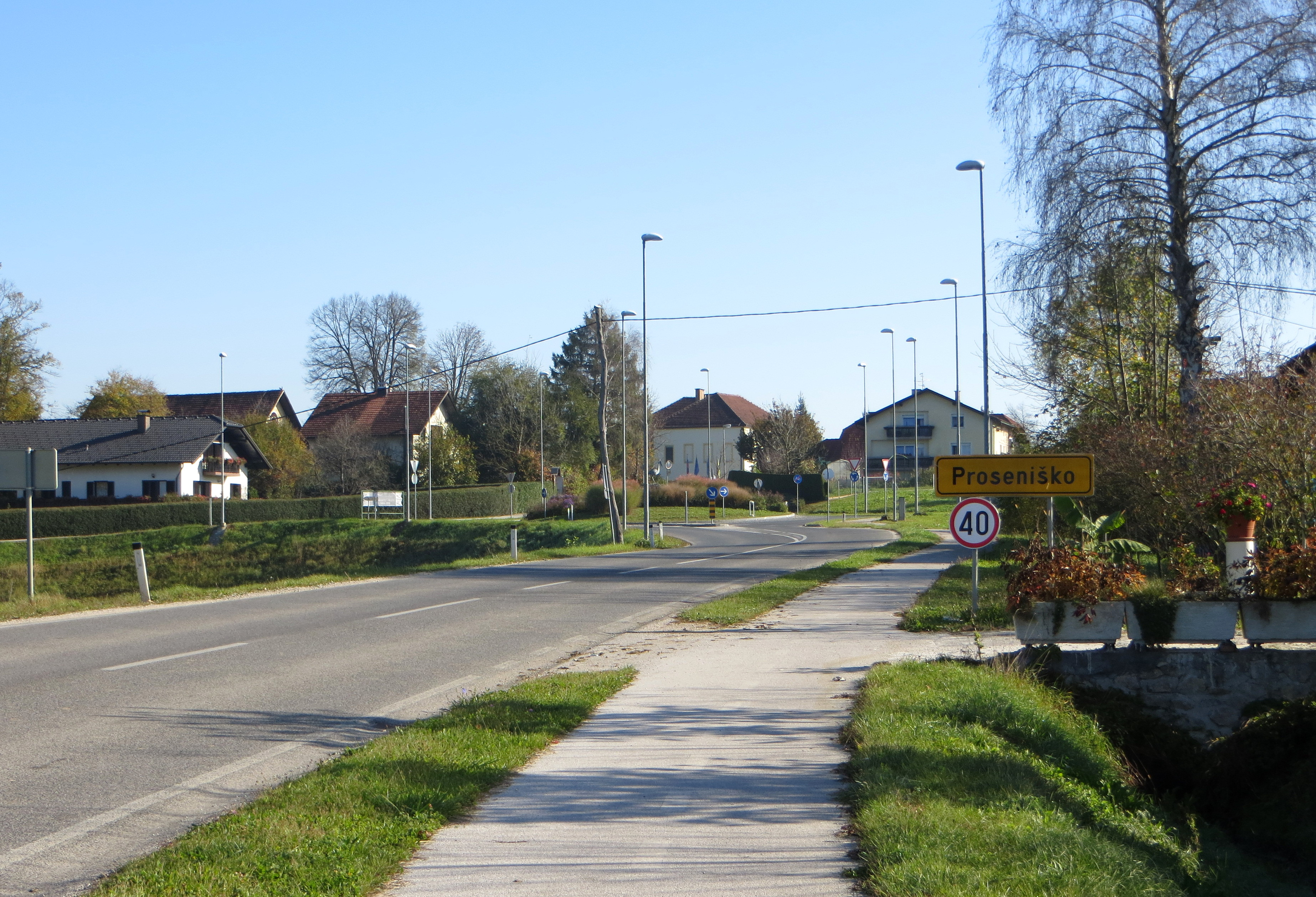

- Location in Slovenia
- Coordinates: 46°14′26.51″N 15°20′39.41″E
- Country: Slovenia
- Traditional region: Styria
- Statistical region: Savinja
- Municipality: Šentjur

Area
  - Total: 2.5 km^{2} (0.97 sq mi)
- Elevation: 260.2 m (854 ft)

Population (2020)
  - Total: 565
  - Density: 230/km^{2} (590/sq mi)

Proseniško (pronounced [pɾɔsɛnˈniːʃkɔ]) is a settlement in the Municipality of Šentjur, eastern Slovenia. It lies on the regional road leading east from Celje to Ponikva. Its proximity to Celje, the third-largest city in Slovenia, has made Proseniško the second most populous settlement in the Municipality of Šentjur, after the town (and municipal seat) of Šentjur. The settlement, and the entire municipality, are included in the Savinja Statistical Region, which is in the Slovenian portion of the historical Duchy of Styria.
