= Loke pri Planini =

- Location in Slovenia
- Coordinates: 46°6′43.86″N 15°25′56″E
- Country: Slovenia
- Traditional region: Styria
- Statistical region: Savinja
- Municipality: Šentjur

Area
  - Total: 1.98 km^{2} (0.76 sq mi)
- Elevation: 541.7 m (1,777 ft)

Population (2020)
  - Total: 95
  - Density: 48/km^{2} (120/sq mi)

Loke pri Planini (pronounced [ˈloːkɛ pɾi plaˈniːni]) is a small settlement in the Municipality of Šentjur in eastern Slovenia. It lies in the Sava Hills (Slovene: Posavsko hribovje) northeast of Planina pri Sevnici. The settlement, and the entire municipality, are included in the Savinja Statistical Region, which is in the Slovenian portion of the historical Duchy of Styria.
