= Košnica, Šentjur =

Košnica
- Location in Slovenia
- Coordinates: 46°8′39.87″N 15°27′6.34″E
- Country: Slovenia
- Traditional region: Styria
- Statistical region: Savinja
- Municipality: Šentjur

Area
  - Total: 2.89 km^{2} (1.12 sq mi)
- Elevation: 499.3 m (1,638 ft)

Population (2020)
  - Total: 125
  - Density: 43.3/km^{2} (112/sq mi)

Košnica (pronounced [ˈkoːʃnitsa]) is a dispersed settlement in the Municipality of Šentjur in eastern Slovenia. It lies on the regional road leading south from the town of Šentjur towards Kozje. The settlement, and the entire municipality, are included in the Savinja Statistical Region, which is in the Slovenian portion of the historical Duchy of Styria.
