= Podlešje =

- Location in Slovenia
- Coordinates: 46°9′47.54″N 15°22′47.71″E
- Country: Slovenia
- Traditional region: Styria
- Statistical region: Savinja
- Municipality: Šentjur

Area
  - Total: 1.04 km^{2} (0.40 sq mi)
- Elevation: 521.2 m (1,710 ft)

Population (2020)
  - Total: 58
  - Density: 56/km^{2} (140/sq mi)

Podlešje (pronounced [pɔˈdleːʃjɛ]) is a small settlement in the hills south of the town of Šentjur in the Municipality of Šentjur, eastern Slovenia. The settlement, and the entire municipality, are included in the Savinja Statistical Region, which is in the Slovenian portion of the historical Duchy of Styria.
