= Hrušovje =

- Location in Slovenia
- Coordinates: 46°7′37.86″N 15°26′20.64″E
- Country: Slovenia
- Traditional region: Styria
- Statistical region: Savinja
- Municipality: Šentjur

Area
  - Total: 1.09 km^{2} (0.42 sq mi)
- Elevation: 465.4 m (1,527 ft)

Population (2020)
  - Total: 18
  - Density: 17/km^{2} (43/sq mi)

Hrušovje (pronounced [ˈxɾuːʃɔu̯jɛ], German: Hruschovje) is a small dispersed settlement in the Sava Hills (Slovene: Posavsko hribovje) in the Municipality of Šentjur, in eastern Slovenia. The settlement, and the entire municipality, are included in the Savinja Statistical Region, which is in the Slovenian portion of the historical Duchy of Styria.
