= Grušce =

Grušce Drušce (until 1952)
- Location in Slovenia
- Coordinates: 46°17′35.86″N 15°24′35.63″E
- Country: Slovenia
- Traditional region: Styria
- Statistical region: Savinja
- Municipality: Šentjur

Area
  - Total: 0.99 km^{2} (0.38 sq mi)
- Elevation: 410.5 m (1,347 ft)

Population (2020)
  - Total: 77
  - Density: 78/km^{2} (200/sq mi)

Grušce (pronounced [ˈɡɾuːʃtsɛ]) is a small dispersed settlement in the hills northwest of Dramlje in the Municipality of Šentjur, in eastern Slovenia. The settlement, and the municipality, are included in the Savinja Statistical Region, which is in the Slovenian portion of the historical Duchy of Styria.

== Name ==
The name of the settlement was changed from Drušce to Grušce in 1952.
