= Dolga Gora =

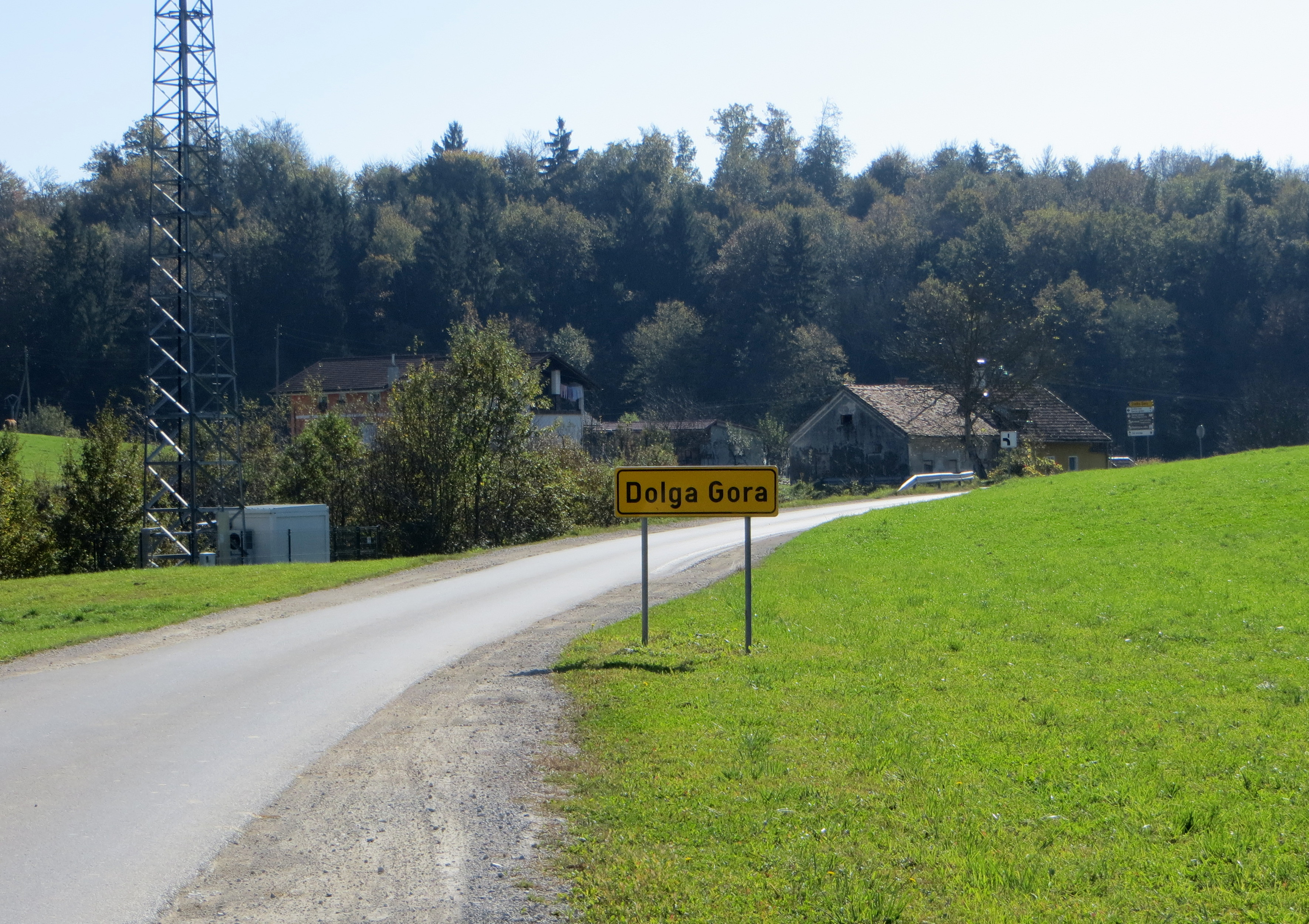

- Location in Slovenia
- Coordinates: 46°16′46.7″N 15°30′54.59″E
- Country: Slovenia
- Traditional region: Styria
- Statistical region: Savinja
- Municipality: Šentjur

Area
  - Total: 2.78 km^{2} (1.07 sq mi)
- Elevation: 441.6 m (1,449 ft)

Population (2020)
  - Total: 274
  - Density: 98.6/km^{2} (255/sq mi)

Dolga Gora (pronounced [ˈdoːu̯ɡa ˈɡɔːɾa]) is a settlement in the Municipality of Šentjur, in eastern Slovenia. The railway line from Ljubljana to Maribor runs through the settlement. The settlement, and the entire municipality, are included in the Savinja Statistical Region, which is in the Slovenian portion of the historical Duchy of Styria.
