= Straška Gorca =

- Location in Slovenia
- Coordinates: 46°6′54.75″N 15°29′6.11″E
- Country: Slovenia
- Traditional region: Styria
- Statistical region: Savinja
- Municipality: Šentjur

Area
  - Total: 1.71 km^{2} (0.66 sq mi)
- Elevation: 440 m (1,440 ft)

Population (2020)
  - Total: 89
  - Density: 52/km^{2} (130/sq mi)

Straška Gorca (pronounced [ˈstɾaːʃka ˈɡoːɾtsa]) is a small settlement in the Municipality of Šentjur in eastern Slovenia. It lies in the Sava Hills (Slovene: Posavsko hribovje), just off the road leading southeast from the town of Šentjur towards Kozje. The settlement, and the entire municipality, are included in the Savinja Statistical Region, which is in the Slovenian portion of the historical Duchy of Styria.
