= Krivica =

- Location in Slovenia
- Coordinates: 46°7′17.56″N 15°29′49.63″E
- Country: Slovenia
- Traditional region: Styria
- Statistical region: Savinja
- Municipality: Šentjur

Area
  - Total: 2.67 km^{2} (1.03 sq mi)
- Elevation: 419.4 m (1,376 ft)

Population (2020)
  - Total: 167
  - Density: 62.5/km^{2} (162/sq mi)

Krivica (pronounced [kɾiˈʋiːtsa]) is a settlement in the Municipality of Šentjur, in eastern Slovenia. It lies in the hills either side of the regional road leading south from the town of Šentjur towards Kozje, just east of Lopaca. The settlement, and the entire municipality, are included in the Savinja Statistical Region, which is in the Slovenian portion of the historical Duchy of Styria.
