= Podlog pod Bohorjem =

- Location in Slovenia
- Coordinates: 46°5′13.36″N 15°27′49.34″E
- Country: Slovenia
- Traditional region: Styria
- Statistical region: Savinja
- Municipality: Šentjur

Area
  - Total: 8.57 km^{2} (3.31 sq mi)
- Elevation: 408.5 m (1,340 ft)

Population (2020)
  - Total: 67
  - Density: 7.8/km^{2} (20/sq mi)

Podlog pod Bohorjem (pronounced [ˈpoːdlɔk pɔd ˈboːxɔɾjɛm]) is a settlement east of Planina pri Sevnici in the Municipality of Šentjur, eastern Slovenia. The settlement, and the entire municipality, are included in the Savinja Statistical Region, which is in the Slovenian portion of the historical Duchy of Styria.

== Name ==
The name of the settlement was changed from Podlog to Podlog pod Bohorjem in 1953.

== Cultural heritage ==
Our Lady of Lourdes Chapel

A small Neo-Gothic chapel in the settlement is dedicated to Our Lady of Lourdes. It was built in 1896.
