= Jakob pri Šentjurju =

Jakob pri Šentjurju Sveti Jakob (until 1955)
- Location in Slovenia
- Coordinates: 46°11′4.43″N 15°23′46.07″E
- Country: Slovenia
- Traditional region: Styria
- Statistical region: Savinja
- Municipality: Šentjur

Area
  - Total: 1.78 km^{2} (0.69 sq mi)
- Elevation: 295.6 m (970 ft)

Population (2020)
  - Total: 142
  - Density: 79.8/km^{2} (207/sq mi)

Jakob pri Šentjurju (pronounced [ˈjaːkɔp pɾi ʃɛnˈtjuːɾju] or [ˈjaːkɔp pɾi ʃənˈtjuːɾju]) is a settlement south of the town of Šentjur in the Municipality of Šentjur, in eastern Slovenia. The settlement, and the entire municipality, are included in the Savinja Statistical Region, which is in the Slovenian portion of the historical Duchy of Styria.

== Name ==
The name of the settlement was changed from Sveti Jakob (literally, 'Saint James') to Jakob pri Šentjurju (literally, 'James near Šentjur') in 1955. The name was changed on the basis of the 1948 Law on Names of Settlements and Designations of Squares, Streets, and Buildings, as part of efforts by Slovenia's postwar communist government to remove religious elements from toponyms.

== Church ==
The local church is dedicated to Saints Phillip and James and belongs to the Parish of Kalobje. It was built around 1600 with some 18th-century rebuilding.
