= Kameno, Šentjur =

Kameno
- Location in Slovenia
- Coordinates: 46°13′59.79″N 15°24′41.02″E
- Country: Slovenia
- Traditional region: Styria
- Statistical region: Savinja
- Municipality: Šentjur

Area
  - Total: 2.08 km^{2} (0.80 sq mi)
- Elevation: 301.7 m (990 ft)

Population (2020)
  - Total: 136
  - Density: 65.4/km^{2} (169/sq mi)

Kameno (pronounced [ˈkaːmɛnɔ]) is a settlement in the hills northeast of the town of Šentjur, Municipality of Šentjur, in eastern Slovenia. The settlement, and the entire municipality, are included in the Savinja Statistical Region, which is in the Slovenian portion of the historical Duchy of Styria.
