= Planinska Vas, Šentjur =

Planinska Vas
- Location in Slovenia
- Coordinates: 46°6′18.52″N 15°26′14.42″E
- Country: Slovenia
- Traditional region: Styria
- Statistical region: Savinja
- Municipality: Šentjur

Area
  - Total: 1.45 km^{2} (0.56 sq mi)
- Elevation: 549.7 m (1,803 ft)

Population (2020)
  - Total: 82
  - Density: 57/km^{2} (150/sq mi)

Planinska Vas (pronounced [plaˈniːnska ˈʋaːs]; Slovene: Planinska vas) is a small village in the Municipality of Šentjur, in eastern Slovenia. It lies in the Sava Hills (Posavsko hribovje) east of Planina pri Sevnici. The settlement, and the entire municipality, are included in the Savinja Statistical Region, which is in the Slovenian portion of the historical Duchy of Styria.

The local church is dedicated to Saint Nicholas and belongs to the Parish of Sveti Vid na Planini. It dates to the late 15th century. The belfry was added in 1767 and the nave was vaulted in 1873.
