= Svetelka =

- Location in Slovenia
- Coordinates: 46°16′41.75″N 15°23′6.94″E
- Country: Slovenia
- Traditional region: Styria
- Statistical region: Savinja
- Municipality: Šentjur

Area
  - Total: 1.24 km^{2} (0.48 sq mi)
- Elevation: 338.7 m (1,111 ft)

Population (2020)
  - Total: 239
  - Density: 193/km^{2} (499/sq mi)

Svetelka (pronounced [ˈsʋeːtəlka]) is a settlement immediately west of Dramlje in the Municipality of Šentjur, eastern Slovenia. The settlement, and the entire municipality, are included in the Savinja Statistical Region, which is in the Slovenian portion of the historical Duchy of Styria.
