= Paridol =

- Location in Slovenia
- Coordinates: 46°9′11.12″N 15°25′0.76″E
- Country: Slovenia
- Traditional region: Styria
- Statistical region: Savinja
- Municipality: Šentjur

Area
  - Total: 2.68 km^{2} (1.03 sq mi)
- Elevation: 441.4 m (1,448 ft)

Population (2020)
  - Total: 123
  - Density: 45.9/km^{2} (119/sq mi)

Paridol (pronounced [paɾiˈdoːl]) is a settlement in the Municipality of Šentjur, eastern Slovenia. It lies off the regional road leading south out of the town of Šentjur towards Planina. The settlement, and the entire municipality, are included in the Savinja Statistical Region, which is in the Slovenian portion of the historical Duchy of Styria.
