= Hrastje, Šentjur =

Hrastje
- Location in Slovenia
- Coordinates: 46°8′30.57″N 15°28′4.05″E
- Country: Slovenia
- Traditional region: Styria
- Statistical region: Savinja
- Municipality: Šentjur

Area
  - Total: 4.43 km^{2} (1.71 sq mi)
- Elevation: 367.5 m (1,206 ft)

Population (2020)
  - Total: 129
  - Density: 29.1/km^{2} (75.4/sq mi)

Hrastje (pronounced [ˈxɾaːstjɛ]) is a settlement east of Dobrina in the Municipality of Šentjur, in eastern Slovenia. The settlement, and the municipality, are included in the Savinja Statistical Region, which is in the Slovenian portion of the historical Duchy of Styria.

== Name ==
The name Hrastje is derived from the Slovene common noun hrast 'oak', referring to the local vegetation.
