= Zlateče pri Šentjurju =

Zlateče pri Šentjurju Sveta Rozalija (until 1953)
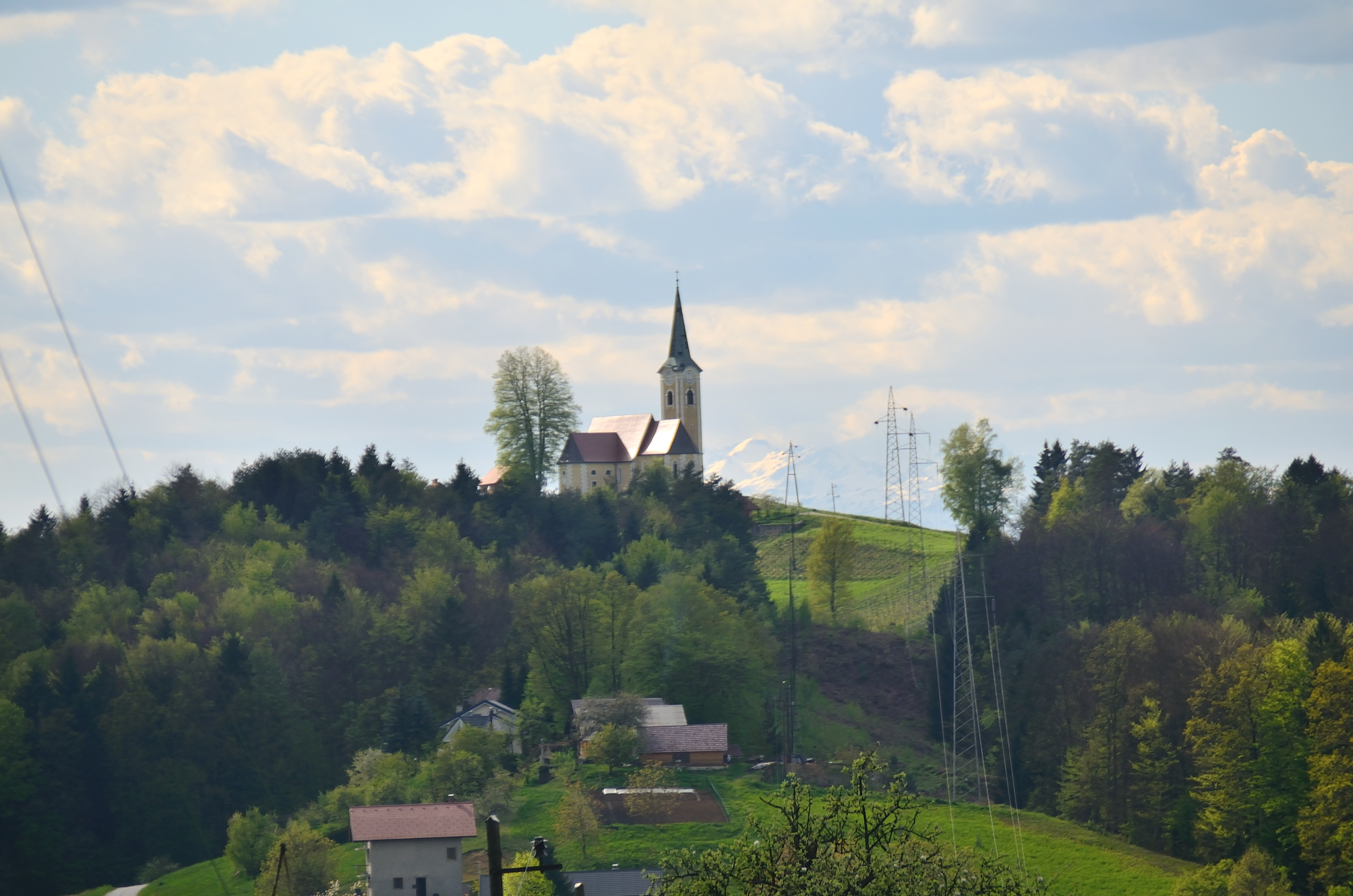

- Location in Slovenia
- Coordinates: 46°13′46.15″N 15°21′43.09″E
- Country: Slovenia
- Traditional region: Styria
- Statistical region: Savinja
- Municipality: Šentjur

Area
  - Total: 1.65 km^{2} (0.64 sq mi)
- Elevation: 324.4 m (1,064 ft)

Population (2020)
  - Total: 102
  - Density: 61.8/km^{2} (160/sq mi)

Zlateče pri Šentjurju (pronounced [zlaˈteːtʃɛ pɾi ʃɛnˈtjuːɾju] or [zlaˈteːtʃɛ pɾi ʃənˈtjuːɾju]) is a settlement in the Municipality of Šentjur, eastern Slovenia. The settlement, and the entire municipality, are included in the Savinja Statistical Region, which is in the Slovenian portion of the historical Duchy of Styria.

== Name ==
The name of the settlement was changed from Sveta Rozalija (literally, 'Saint Rosalia') to Zlateče pri Šentjurju in 1953. The name was changed on the basis of the 1948 Law on Names of Settlements and Designations of Squares, Streets, and Buildings as part of efforts by Slovenia's postwar communist government to remove religious elements from toponyms.

== Church ==
The local church, built on a hill east of the settlement, is dedicated to Saint Rosalia and belongs to the Parish of Šentjur. It dates to the 17th century, with a chapel dedicated to Saint Anthony added to the southern nave in 1746. The church was built as a votive offering in the aftermath of the plague of 1645–1660; it is distinguished by its high-quality architecture and stonework. The main altar dates from 1667, and the three altars in the nave from 1859. The chancel was painted in 1908 by the Celje painter Albin Paradiž (1879–1910). The glass chandelier dates to 1850. The largest of the church's bells was cast in Celje in 1756 by Gašper Schneider (1726–1774); its tone was considered so strikingly gentle that the composer Gustav Ipavec composed the song "Iz stolpa se mi zvon doni" (From the Tower the Bell Tolls to Me) in its honor. Saint Anthony's chapel contains frescoes by the Ljubljana painter Franc Jelovšek (1700–1764), an altar dating from 1864 to 1866 by the Celje wood-carver Ignacij Oblak (1834–1916), and a pulpit from 1870.
