= Krajnčica =

- Location in Slovenia
- Coordinates: 46°12′20.6″N 15°21′52.79″E
- Country: Slovenia
- Traditional region: Styria
- Statistical region: Savinja
- Municipality: Šentjur

Area
  - Total: 3.37 km^{2} (1.30 sq mi)
- Elevation: 299 m (981 ft)

Population (2020)
  - Total: 237
  - Density: 70.3/km^{2} (182/sq mi)

Krajnčica (pronounced [ˈkɾaːi̯ntʃitsa]) is a settlement in the Municipality of Šentjur in eastern Slovenia. It lies in the hills above the left bank of the Voglajna River southwest of the town of Šentjur. The settlement, and the entire municipality, are included in the Savinja Statistical Region, which is in the Slovenian portion of the historical Duchy of Styria.
