= Vodice pri Slivnici =

- Location in Slovenia
- Coordinates: 46°10′18.23″N 15°24′44.95″E
- Country: Slovenia
- Traditional region: Styria
- Statistical region: Savinja
- Municipality: Šentjur

Area
  - Total: 0.62 km^{2} (0.24 sq mi)
- Elevation: 346.2 m (1,136 ft)

Population (2020)
  - Total: 26
  - Density: 42/km^{2} (110/sq mi)

Vodice pri Slivnici (pronounced [ʋɔˈdiːtsɛ pɾi ˈsliːu̯nitsi]) is a small settlement west of Slivnica in the Municipality of Šentjur, eastern Slovenia. The settlement, and the entire municipality, are included in the Savinja Statistical Region, which is in the Slovenian portion of the historical Duchy of Styria.

== Name ==
The name of the settlement was changed from Vodice to Vodice pri Slivnici in 1953.
