= Voglajna, Šentjur =

Voglajna
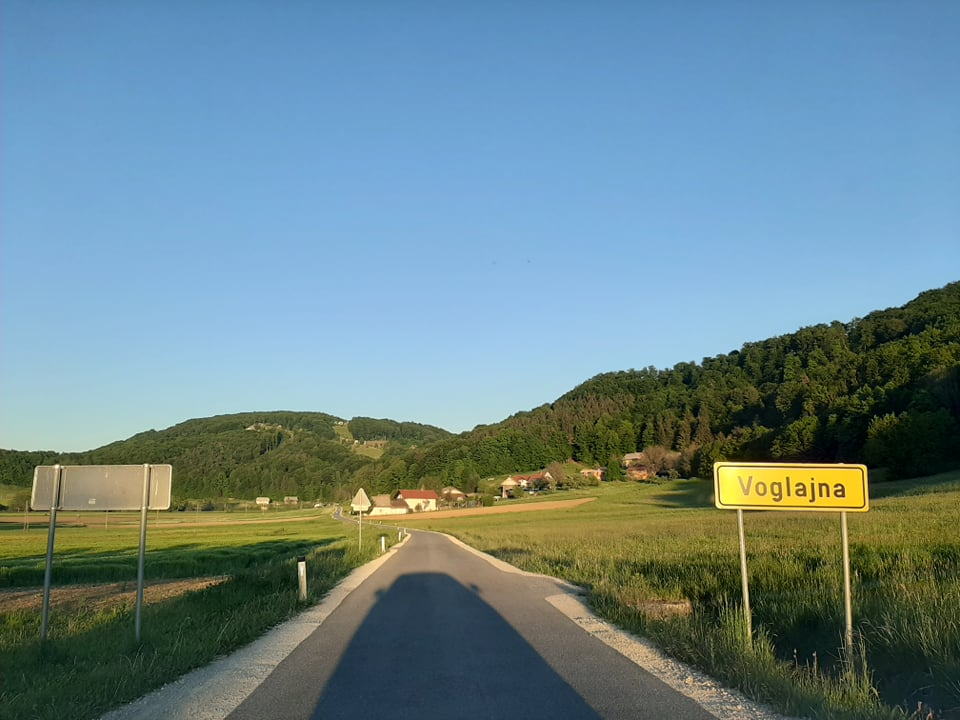

- Location in Slovenia
- Coordinates: 46°10′54.3″N 15°25′40.25″E
- Country: Slovenia
- Traditional region: Styria
- Statistical region: Savinja
- Municipality: Šentjur

Area
  - Total: 0.78 km^{2} (0.30 sq mi)

Population (2020)
  - Total: 40
  - Density: 51/km^{2} (130/sq mi)

Voglajna (pronounced [ʋɔˈɡlaːi̯na]) is a small settlement in the Municipality of Šentjur, eastern Slovenia. It lies on the upper course of the Voglajna River, south of Gorica pri Slivnici. The settlement, and the entire municipality, are included in the Savinja Statistical Region, which is in the Slovenian portion of the historical Duchy of Styria.
