= Tratna pri Grobelnem =

- Location in Slovenia
- Coordinates: 46°12′8.94″N 15°26′28.41″E
- Country: Slovenia
- Traditional region: Styria
- Statistical region: Savinja
- Municipality: Šentjur

Area
  - Total: 2.08 km^{2} (0.80 sq mi)
- Elevation: 352 m (1,155 ft)

Population (2020)
  - Total: 267
  - Density: 128/km^{2} (332/sq mi)

Tratna pri Grobelnem (pronounced [ˈtɾaːtna pɾi ˈɡɾoːbəlnɛm]) is a settlement south of Grobelno in the Municipality of Šentjur, eastern Slovenia. The main railway line from Ljubljana to Maribor runs along the northern edge of the settlement. The settlement, and the entire municipality, are included in the Savinja Statistical Region, which is in the Slovenian portion of the historical Duchy of Styria.

== Name ==
The name of the settlement was changed from Tratna to Tratna pri Grobelnem in 1953.
