= Sotensko pod Kalobjem =

- Location in Slovenia
- Coordinates: 46°11′29.44″N 15°23′27.6″E
- Country: Slovenia
- Traditional region: Styria
- Statistical region: Savinja
- Municipality: Šentjur

Area
  - Total: 0.5 km^{2} (0.19 sq mi)
- Elevation: 309.1 m (1,014 ft)

Population (2020)
  - Total: 27
  - Density: 54/km^{2} (140/sq mi)

Sotensko pod Kalobjem (pronounced [ˈsoːtɛnskɔ pɔt ˈkaːlɔbjɛm]) is a small settlement in the Municipality of Šentjur, eastern Slovenia. It lies just off the regional road leading south out of the town of Šentjur, towards Šentrupert. The settlement, and the entire municipality, are included in the Savinja Statistical Region, which is in the Slovenian portion of the historical Duchy of Styria.

== Name ==
The name of the settlement was changed from Sotensko to Sotensko pod Kalobjem in 1953.
