= Podvine =

- Location in Slovenia
- Coordinates: 46°6′36.53″N 15°26′56.02″E
- Country: Slovenia
- Traditional region: Styria
- Statistical region: Savinja
- Municipality: Šentjur

Area
  - Total: 1.12 km^{2} (0.43 sq mi)
- Elevation: 531.6 m (1,744 ft)

Population (2020)
  - Total: 73
  - Density: 65/km^{2} (170/sq mi)

Podvine (pronounced [pɔˈdʋiːnɛ]) is a small settlement in the Municipality of Šentjur, eastern Slovenia. It lies in the Sava Hills (Slovene: Posavsko hribovje) east of Planina pri Sevnici. The settlement, and the entire municipality, are included in the Savinja Statistical Region, which is in the Slovenian portion of the historical Duchy of Styria.
