= Goričica, Šentjur =

Goričica
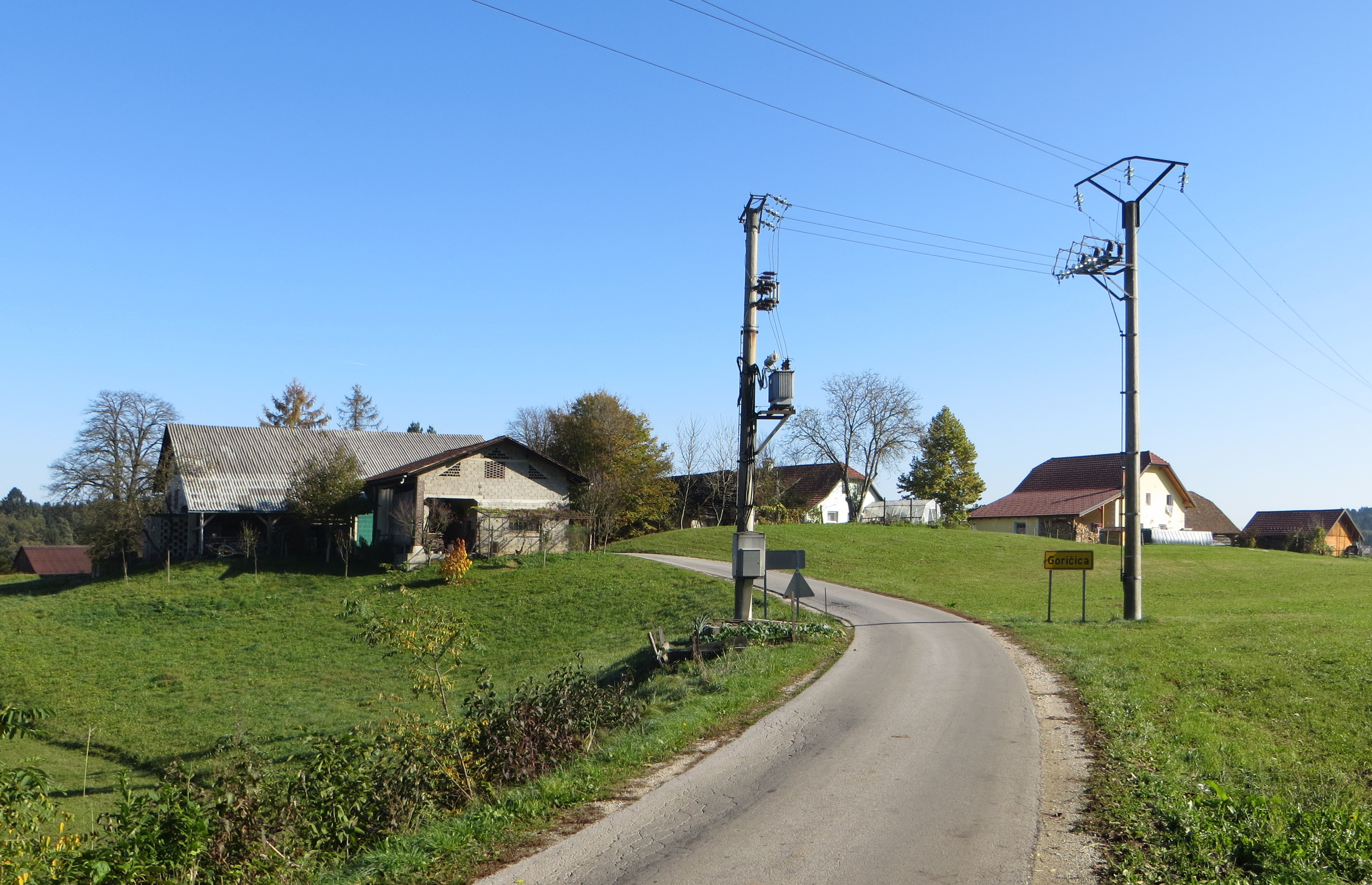

- Location in Slovenia
- Coordinates: 46°14′24.88″N 15°22′24.89″E
- Country: Slovenia
- Traditional region: Styria
- Statistical region: Savinja
- Municipality: Šentjur

Area
  - Total: 2.89 km^{2} (1.12 sq mi)
- Elevation: 274 m (899 ft)

Population (2020)
  - Total: 198
  - Density: 68.5/km^{2} (177/sq mi)

Goričica (pronounced [ɡɔˈɾiːtʃitsa]) is a settlement in the Municipality of Šentjur, in eastern Slovenia. The settlement, and the municipality, are included in the Savinja Statistical Region, which is in the Slovenian portion of the historical Duchy of Styria.
