= Vodruž =

- Location in Slovenia
- Coordinates: 46°11′2.96″N 15°23′1.76″E
- Country: Slovenia
- Traditional region: Styria
- Statistical region: Savinja
- Municipality: Šentjur

Area
  - Total: 3.8 km^{2} (1.5 sq mi)
- Elevation: 303.3 m (995 ft)

Population (2020)
  - Total: 222
  - Density: 58/km^{2} (150/sq mi)

Vodruž (pronounced [ˈʋoːdɾuʃ]) is a settlement in the Municipality of Šentjur, eastern Slovenia. It is dispersed in the valley of Kozarica Creek, in the hills south of the town of Šentjur. The settlement, and the entire municipality, are included in the Savinja Statistical Region, which is in the Slovenian portion of the historical Duchy of Styria.
