= Zgornje Selce =

- Location in Slovenia
- Coordinates: 46°14′0.07″N 15°26′19.5″E
- Country: Slovenia
- Traditional region: Styria
- Statistical region: Savinja
- Municipality: Šentjur

Area
  - Total: 1.04 km^{2} (0.40 sq mi)
- Elevation: 333.1 m (1,093 ft)

Population (2020)
  - Total: 95
  - Density: 91/km^{2} (240/sq mi)

Zgornje Selce (pronounced [ˈzɡoːɾnjɛ ˈseːu̯tsɛ], in older sources also Zgornje Sevce, German: Oberseutze) is a settlement in the Municipality of Šentjur in eastern Slovenia. It lies between Ponikva and Grobelno. The railway line from Celje to Maribor runs along the western edge of the settlement's territory. The settlement, and the entire municipality, are included in the Savinja Statistical Region, which is in the Slovenian portion of the historical Duchy of Styria.
