= Laze pri Dramljah =

- Location in Slovenia
- Coordinates: 46°16′3.19″N 15°23′12.27″E
- Country: Slovenia
- Traditional region: Styria
- Statistical region: Savinja
- Municipality: Šentjur

Area
  - Total: 2.78 km^{2} (1.07 sq mi)
- Elevation: 307.7 m (1,010 ft)

Population (2020)
  - Total: 161
  - Density: 57.9/km^{2} (150/sq mi)

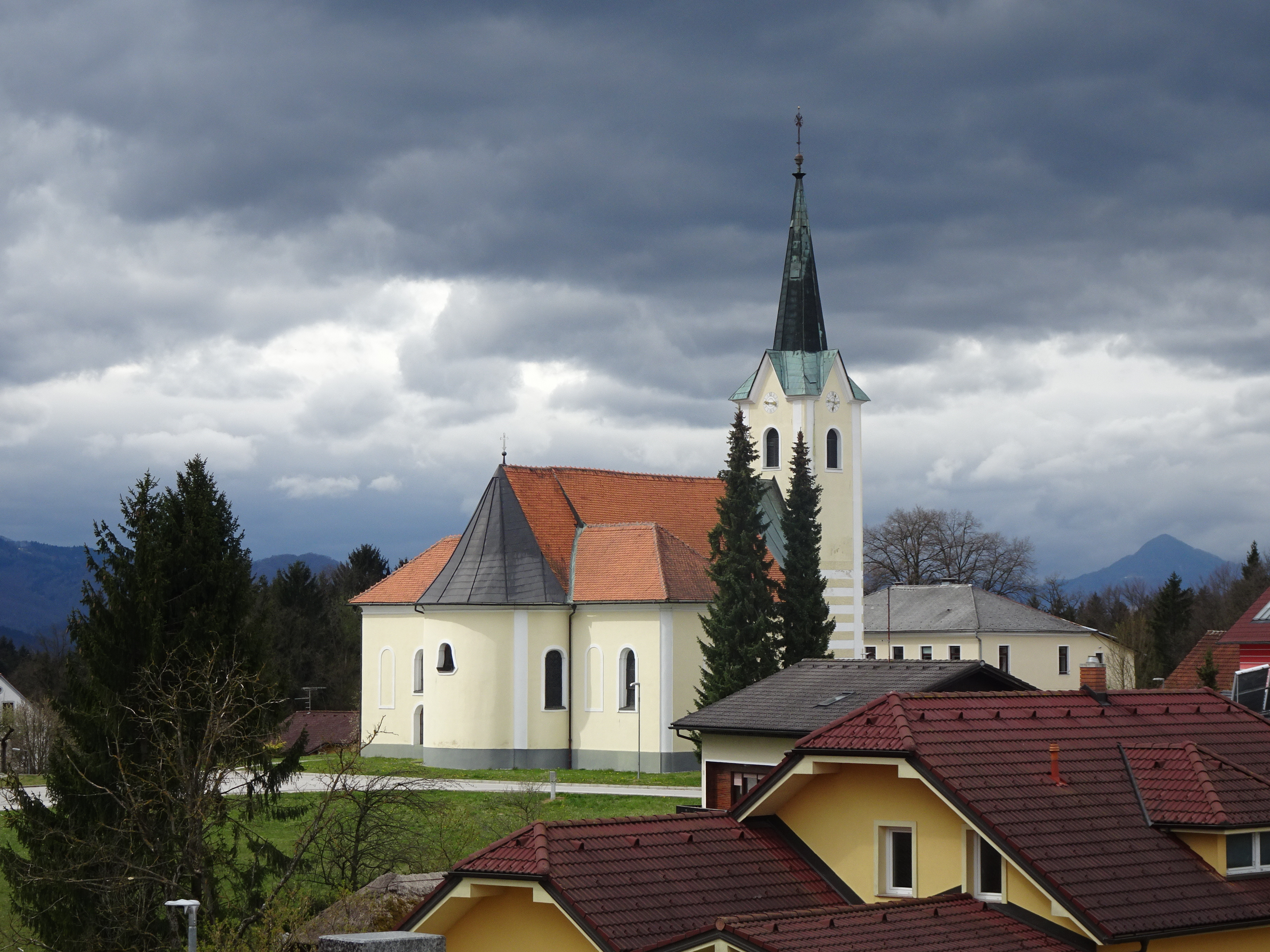
st. Maria Maddalena Parish Church, Dramlje, Slovenia

Laze pri Dramljah (pronounced [ˈlaːzɛ pɾi ˈdɾaːmljax]) is a settlement in the Municipality of Šentjur in eastern Slovenia. It lies just south of Dramlje. The A1 motorway crosses the settlement's territory south of the village. The settlement, and the entire municipality, are included in the Savinja Statistical Region, which is in the Slovenian portion of the historical Duchy of Styria.

== Name ==
The name of the settlement was changed from Laze to Laze pri Dramljah in 1955.

== Church ==
The local parish church is dedicated to Mary Magdalene and belongs to the Roman Catholic Diocese of Celje. It dates to the mid-18th century.
