= Planinski Vrh =

Planinski Vrh Vrh (until 1953)
- Location in Slovenia
- Coordinates: 46°6′46.25″N 15°26′46.31″E
- Country: Slovenia
- Traditional region: Styria
- Statistical region: Savinja
- Municipality: Šentjur

Area
  - Total: 1.05 km^{2} (0.41 sq mi)
- Elevation: 528.9 m (1,735 ft)

Population (2020)
  - Total: 56
  - Density: 53/km^{2} (140/sq mi)

Planinski Vrh (pronounced [plaˈniːnski ˈʋəɾx]) is a settlement in the Sava Hills (Slovene: Posavsko hribovje) in the Municipality of Šentjur, eastern Slovenia. It lies northeast of Planina pri Sevnici. The settlement, and the entire municipality, are included in the Savinja Statistical Region, which is in the Slovenian portion of the historical Duchy of Styria.

== Name ==
The name of the settlement was changed from Vrh to Planinski Vrh in 1953.
