= Slatina pri Ponikvi =

- Location in Slovenia
- Coordinates: 46°17′4.06″N 15°27′38.53″E
- Country: Slovenia
- Traditional region: Styria
- Statistical region: Savinja
- Municipality: Šentjur

Area
  - Total: 3.15 km^{2} (1.22 sq mi)
- Elevation: 396 m (1,299 ft)

Population (2020)
  - Total: 134
  - Density: 42.5/km^{2} (110/sq mi)

Slatina pri Ponikvi (pronounced [ˈslaːtina pɾi ˈpoːnikʋi]) is a dispersed settlement in the hills north of Ponikva in the Municipality of Šentjur, eastern Slovenia. The settlement, and the entire municipality, are included in the Savinja Statistical Region, which is in the Slovenian portion of the historical Duchy of Styria.

== Name ==
The name of the settlement was changed from Slatina to Slatina pri Ponikvi in 1953.
