= Rakitovec, Šentjur =

Rakitovec
- Location in Slovenia
- Coordinates: 46°11′16.26″N 15°27′21.62″E
- Country: Slovenia
- Traditional region: Styria
- Statistical region: Savinja
- Municipality: Šentjur

Area
  - Total: 0.68 km^{2} (0.26 sq mi)
- Elevation: 306.9 m (1,007 ft)

Population (2020)
  - Total: 51
  - Density: 75/km^{2} (190/sq mi)

Rakitovec (pronounced [ɾaˈkiːtɔʋəts]) is a small settlement in the Municipality of Šentjur, eastern Slovenia. It lies on the shore of Lake Slivnica, east of Gorica pri Slivnici. The settlement, and the entire municipality, are included in the Savinja Statistical Region, which is in the Slovenian portion of the historical Duchy of Styria.
