= Municipality of Šentjur =

Municipality of Slovenia

Municipality of Šentjur Občina Šentjur
- Municipality
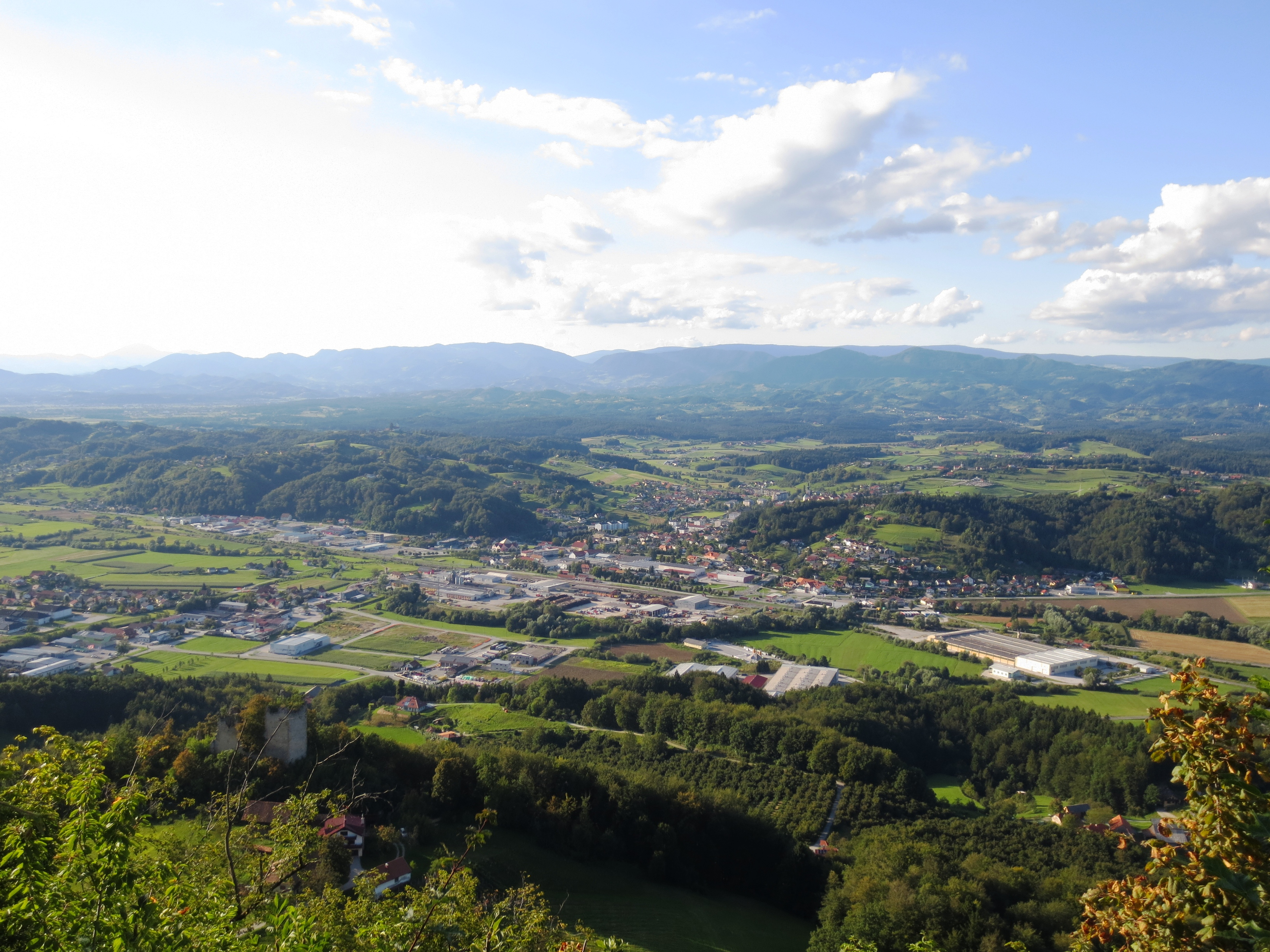

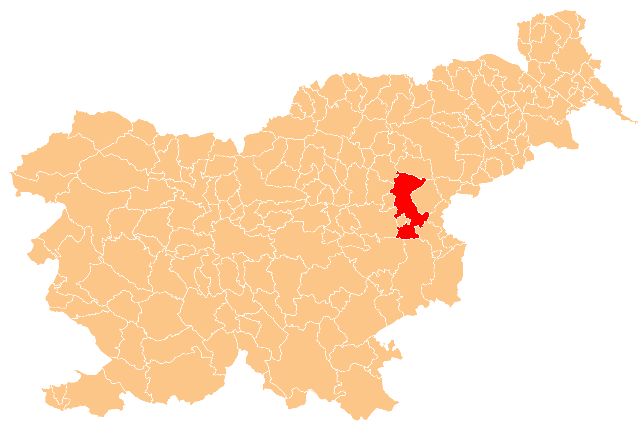
- Location of the Municipality of Šentjur in Slovenia
- Coordinates: 46°13′N 15°24′E
- Country: Slovenia

Government
  - Mayor: Marko Diaci (Independent)

Area
  - Total: 222.3 km^{2} (85.8 sq mi)

Population (2020)
  - Total: 19,225
  - Density: 86.48/km^{2} (224.0/sq mi)
- Time zone: UTC+01 (CET)
  - Summer (DST): UTC+02 (CEST)
- Website: www.sentjur.si

The Municipality of Šentjur (Slovene: Občina Šentjur), named Municipality of Šentjur pri Celju (Občina Šentjur pri Celju) until 2002, is a municipality in eastern Slovenia. The town of Šentjur is the seat of the municipality. With an area of 223 square kilometers (86 sq mi) it is one of the larger municipalities in Slovenia. The area is part of the traditional region of Styria. The municipality is now included in the Savinja Statistical Region. Saint George appears on the municipal coat of arms.

== Settlements ==
In addition to the municipal seat of Šentjur, the municipality also includes the following settlements:

- Bezovje pri Šentjurju
- Bobovo pri Ponikvi
- Boletina
- Botričnica
- Brdo
- Brezje ob Slomu
- Bukovje pri Slivnici
- Cerovec
- Črnolica
- Dobje pri Lesičnem
- Dobovec pri Ponikvi
- Dobrina
- Dole
- Dolga Gora
- Doropolje
- Dramlje
- Drobinsko
- Golobinjek pri Planini
- Gorica pri Slivnici
- Goričica
- Grobelno (Šentjur portion)*
- Grušce
- Hotunje
- Hrastje
- Hruševec
- Hrušovje
- Jakob pri Šentjurju
- Jarmovec
- Javorje
- Jazbin Vrh
- Jazbine
- Jelce
- Kalobje
- Kameno
- Kostrivnica
- Košnica
- Krajnčica
- Krivica
- Laze pri Dramljah
- Loka pri Žusmu
- Lokarje
- Loke pri Planini
- Lopaca
- Lutrje
- Marija Dobje
- Okrog
- Osredek
- Ostrožno pri Ponikvi
- Paridol
- Planina pri Sevnici
- Planinca
- Planinska Vas
- Planinski Vrh
- Pletovarje
- Podgaj
- Podgrad
- Podlešje
- Podlog pod Bohorjem
- Podpeč nad Marofom
- Podpeč pri Šentvidu
- Podvine
- Ponikva
- Ponkvica
- Prapretno
- Primož pri Šentjurju
- Proseniško
- Rakitovec
- Razbor
- Repno
- Rifnik
- Sele
- Slatina pri Ponikvi
- Slivnica pri Celju
- Sotensko pod Kalobjem
- Spodnje Slemene
- Srževica
- Stopče
- Straška Gorca
- Straža na Gori
- Svetelka
- Šedina
- Šentvid pri Planini
- Šibenik
- Tajhte
- Tratna ob Voglajni
- Tratna pri Grobelnem
- Trno
- Trnovec pri Dramljah
- Trška Gorca
- Turno
- Uniše
- Vejice
- Vezovje
- Visoče
- Vodice pri Kalobju
- Vodice pri Slivnici
- Vodruž
- Voduce
- Vodule
- Voglajna
- Vrbno
- Zagaj pri Ponikvi
- Zalog pod Uršulo
- Zgornje Selce
- Zgornje Slemene
- Zlateče pri Šentjurju
- Žegar

*Because the settlement of Grobelno straddles two municipalities, it appears on this list as well as the Municipality of Šmarje pri Jelšah list
