= Zagaj pri Ponikvi =

- Location in Slovenia
- Coordinates: 46°16′48.52″N 15°26′30.66″E
- Country: Slovenia
- Traditional region: Styria
- Statistical region: Savinja
- Municipality: Šentjur

Area
  - Total: 4.62 km^{2} (1.78 sq mi)
- Elevation: 316.6 m (1,039 ft)

Population (2020)
  - Total: 115
  - Density: 24.9/km^{2} (64.5/sq mi)

Zagaj pri Ponikvi (pronounced [zaˈɡaːi̯ pɾi ˈpoːnikʋi], German: Sagaj) is a settlement in the hills north of Ponikva in the Municipality of Šentjur in eastern Slovenia. The settlement, and the entire municipality, are included in the Savinja Statistical Region, which is in the Slovenian portion of the historical Duchy of Styria.

== Name ==
The name of the settlement was changed from Zagaj to Zagaj pri Ponikvi in 1953.

== Notable people ==
Notable people that were born or lived in Zagaj pri Ponikvi include:

- Mihael Zagajšek (sl) (a.k.a. Jurij Zelenko, Georg Sellenko; 1739–1827), Roman Catholic priest, grammarian, lexicographer, and translator
