= Vejice =

- Location in Slovenia
- Coordinates: 46°5′8.42″N 15°23′55.15″E
- Country: Slovenia
- Traditional region: Styria
- Statistical region: Savinja
- Municipality: Šentjur

Area
  - Total: 2.37 km^{2} (0.92 sq mi)
- Elevation: 462.2 m (1,516 ft)

Population (2020)
  - Total: 16
  - Density: 6.8/km^{2} (17/sq mi)

Vejice (pronounced [ˈʋɛːjitsɛ] or [ˈʋeːjitsɛ]) is a small settlement in the Municipality of Šentjur, eastern Slovenia. It lies on the slopes of Mount Bohor, south of Planina pri Sevnici. The settlement, and the entire municipality, are included in the Savinja Statistical Region, which is in the Slovenian portion of the historical Duchy of Styria.
