= Zalog pod Uršulo =

- Location in Slovenia
- Coordinates: 46°17′12.31″N 15°24′9.29″E
- Country: Slovenia
- Traditional region: Styria
- Statistical region: Savinja
- Municipality: Šentjur

Area
  - Total: 0.74 km^{2} (0.29 sq mi)
- Elevation: 338.5 m (1,111 ft)

Population (2020)
  - Total: 46
  - Density: 62/km^{2} (160/sq mi)

Zalog pod Uršulo (pronounced [ˈzaːlɔk pɾi ˈuːɾʃulɔ]) is a settlement north of Dramlje in the Municipality of Šentjur, eastern Slovenia. The settlement, and the entire municipality, are included in the Savinja Statistical Region, which is in the Slovenian portion of the historical Duchy of Styria.

== Name ==
The name of the settlement was changed from Zalog to Zalog pod Uršulo in 1953.
