= Vezovje =

- Location in Slovenia
- Coordinates: 46°10′53.54″N 15°24′41.95″E
- Country: Slovenia
- Traditional region: Styria
- Statistical region: Savinja
- Municipality: Šentjur

Area
  - Total: 1.43 km^{2} (0.55 sq mi)
- Elevation: 330.8 m (1,085 ft)

Population (2020)
  - Total: 64
  - Density: 45/km^{2} (120/sq mi)

Vezovje (pronounced [ʋɛˈzoːu̯jɛ]) is a dispersed settlement in the Municipality of Šentjur, eastern Slovenia. It lies mostly west of the regional road leading south from the town of Šentjur to Planina pri Sevnici. The settlement, and the entire municipality, are included in the Savinja Statistical Region, which is in the Slovenian portion of the historical Duchy of Styria.
