= Kostrivnica =

- Location in Slovenia
- Coordinates: 46°9′14.58″N 15°22′22.78″E
- Country: Slovenia
- Traditional region: Styria
- Statistical region: Savinja
- Municipality: Šentjur

Area
  - Total: 3.78 km^{2} (1.46 sq mi)
- Elevation: 335 m (1,099 ft)

Population (2020)
  - Total: 196
  - Density: 51.9/km^{2} (134/sq mi)

Kostrivnica (pronounced [kɔˈstɾiːu̯nitsa]) is a dispersed settlement in the Municipality of Šentjur, in eastern Slovenia. It lies in the northern part of the Sava Hills (Slovene: Posavsko hribovje) north of Planina. The settlement, and the entire municipality, are included in the Savinja Statistical Region, which is in the Slovenian portion of the historical Duchy of Styria.
