= Podgrad, Šentjur =

Podgrad
- Location in Slovenia
- Coordinates: 46°13′12.56″N 15°22′52.87″E
- Country: Slovenia
- Traditional region: Styria
- Statistical region: Savinja
- Municipality: Šentjur

Area
  - Total: 1.82 km^{2} (0.70 sq mi)
- Elevation: 364.5 m (1,196 ft)

Population (2020)
  - Total: 211
  - Density: 116/km^{2} (300/sq mi)

Podgrad (pronounced [pɔdˈɡɾáːt, ˈpɔ̀ːdɡɾat]) is a settlement in the Municipality of Šentjur in eastern Slovenia. It lies northwest of the town of Šentjur. The settlement, and the entire municipality, are included in the Savinja Statistical Region, which is in the Slovenian portion of the historical Duchy of Styria.
