= Brezje ob Slomu =

- Location in Slovenia
- Coordinates: 46°14′18.68″N 15°25′41.37″E
- Country: Slovenia
- Traditional region: Styria
- Statistical region: Savinja
- Municipality: Šentjur

Area
  - Total: 1.19 km^{2} (0.46 sq mi)
- Elevation: 316.7 m (1,039 ft)

Population (2020)
  - Total: 78
  - Density: 66/km^{2} (170/sq mi)

Brezje ob Slomu (pronounced [ˈbɾeːzjɛ ɔp ˈsloːmu]) is a settlement in the Municipality of Šentjur, in eastern Slovenia. The settlement, and the entire municipality, are included in the Savinja Statistical Region, which is in the Slovenian portion of the historical Duchy of Styria.

The railway line from Celje to Maribor runs along the eastern edge of the settlement.
