= Trška Gorca =

- Location in Slovenia
- Coordinates: 46°10′13.74″N 15°24′32.79″E
- Country: Slovenia
- Traditional region: Styria
- Statistical region: Savinja
- Municipality: Šentjur

Area
  - Total: 0.48 km^{2} (0.19 sq mi)
- Elevation: 343.7 m (1,128 ft)

Population (2020)
  - Total: 44
  - Density: 92/km^{2} (240/sq mi)

Trška Gorca (pronounced [ˈtəɾʃka ˈɡoːɾtsa]) is a small settlement in the Municipality of Šentjur, eastern Slovenia. It lies just off the regional road leading south from the town of Šentjur to Planina pri Sevnici. The settlement, and the entire municipality, are included in the Savinja Statistical Region, which is in the Slovenian portion of the historical Duchy of Styria.
