= Tajhte =

- Location in Slovenia
- Coordinates: 46°6′55.38″N 15°25′6.72″E
- Country: Slovenia
- Traditional region: Styria
- Statistical region: Savinja
- Municipality: Šentjur

Area
  - Total: 1.2 km^{2} (0.46 sq mi)
- Elevation: 489.5 m (1,606 ft)

Population (2020)
  - Total: 62
  - Density: 52/km^{2} (130/sq mi)

Tajhte (pronounced [ˈtaːi̯xtɛ]) is a settlement in the Municipality of Šentjur, eastern Slovenia. Tajhte is a dispersed settlement, in the Sava Hills north of Planina pri Sevnici. The settlement, and the entire municipality, are included in the Savinja Statistical Region, which is in the Slovenian portion of the historical Duchy of Styria.
