= Razbor, Šentjur =

Razbor
- Location in Slovenia
- Coordinates: 46°15′55.7″N 15°24′54.96″E
- Country: Slovenia
- Traditional region: Styria
- Statistical region: Savinja
- Municipality: Šentjur

Area
  - Total: 2.69 km^{2} (1.04 sq mi)
- Elevation: 326.8 m (1,072 ft)

Population (2020)
  - Total: 198
  - Density: 73.6/km^{2} (191/sq mi)

Razbor (pronounced [ˈɾaːzbɔɾ]) is a settlement in the Municipality of Šentjur, eastern Slovenia. It lies in the hills between Ponikva and Dramlje. The Slovenian A1 motorway runs along the northwestern edge of the settlement's territory. The settlement, and the entire municipality, are included in the Savinja Statistical Region, which is in the Slovenian portion of the historical Duchy of Styria.
