= Marija Dobje =

- Location in Slovenia
- Coordinates: 46°16′40.44″N 15°21′33.97″E
- Country: Slovenia
- Traditional region: Styria
- Statistical region: Savinja
- Municipality: Šentjur

Area
  - Total: 2.89 km^{2} (1.12 sq mi)
- Elevation: 336.9 m (1,105 ft)

Population (2020)
  - Total: 186
  - Density: 64.4/km^{2} (167/sq mi)

Marija Dobje (pronounced [maˈɾiːja ˈdoːbjɛ]) is a village in the Municipality of Šentjur, eastern Slovenia. It lies in the hills west of Dramlje. The settlement, and the entire municipality, are included in the Savinja Statistical Region, which is in the Slovenian portion of the historical Duchy of Styria.

The local church is dedicated to the Assumption of Mary and belongs to the Parish of Dramlje. It was built in 1639.
