= Dobovec pri Ponikvi =

- Location in Slovenia
- Coordinates: 46°16′7.03″N 15°27′45.06″E
- Country: Slovenia
- Traditional region: Styria
- Statistical region: Savinja
- Municipality: Šentjur

Area
  - Total: 1.62 km^{2} (0.63 sq mi)
- Elevation: 287 m (942 ft)

Population (2020)
  - Total: 78
  - Density: 48/km^{2} (120/sq mi)

Dobovec pri Ponikvi (pronounced [dɔˈbɔːʋəts pɾi ˈpoːnikʋi] or [dɔˈboːʋəts pɾi ˈpoːnikʋi]) is a settlement northeast of Ponikva in the Municipality of Šentjur, in eastern Slovenia. The settlement, and the entire municipality, are included in the Savinja Statistical Region, which is in the Slovenian portion of the historical Duchy of Styria.

== Name ==
The name of the settlement was changed from Dobovec to Dobovec pri Ponikvi in 1953.
