= Cerovec, Šentjur =

Cerovec
- Location in Slovenia
- Coordinates: 46°15′5.19″N 15°21′39.41″E
- Country: Slovenia
- Traditional region: Styria
- Statistical region: Savinja
- Municipality: Šentjur

Area
  - Total: 4.09 km^{2} (1.58 sq mi)
- Elevation: 296.8 m (974 ft)

Population (2020)
  - Total: 173
  - Density: 42.3/km^{2} (110/sq mi)

Cerovec (pronounced [ˈtseːɾɔʋəts]) is a settlement in the Municipality of Šentjur, in eastern Slovenia. It lies 10 km east of Celje and the A1 motorway crosses the settlement's territory. The settlement, and the entire municipality, are included in the Savinja Statistical Region, which is in the Slovenian portion of the historical Duchy of Styria.

A hidden underground structure in the Šohta Woods near the settlement, built in 1944, was used as a secret Partisan hospital (Slovene: partizanska bolnišnica Zima).
