= Bezovje pri Šentjurju =

- Location in Slovenia
- Coordinates: 46°7′8.57″N 15°30′45.91″E
- Country: Slovenia
- Traditional region: Styria
- Statistical region: Savinja
- Municipality: Šentjur

Area
  - Total: 1.04 km^{2} (0.40 sq mi)
- Elevation: 428.1 m (1,405 ft)

Population (2020)
  - Total: 108
  - Density: 104/km^{2} (269/sq mi)

Bezovje pri Šentjurju (pronounced [bɛˈzoːu̯jɛ pɾi ʃɛnˈtjuːɾju] or [bɛˈzoːu̯jɛ pɾi ʃənˈtjuːɾju];) is a settlement in the Municipality of Šentjur, in Eastern Slovenia. It lies just outside the town of Šentjur, north of the regional road leading east to Šmarje pri Jelšah. The settlement, and the entire municipality, are included in the Savinja Statistical Region, which is in the Slovenian portion of the historical Duchy of Styria.

== Name ==
The name of the settlement was changed from Bezovje to Bezovje pri Šentjurju in 1953.
