= Pletovarje =

- Location in Slovenia
- Coordinates: 46°17′2.19″N 15°25′57.6″E
- Country: Slovenia
- Traditional region: Styria
- Statistical region: Savinja
- Municipality: Šentjur

Area
  - Total: 3.73 km^{2} (1.44 sq mi)
- Elevation: 345.8 m (1,135 ft)

Population (2020)
  - Total: 162
  - Density: 43.4/km^{2} (112/sq mi)

Pletovarje (pronounced [ˈpleːtɔʋaɾjɛ]) is a settlement in the Municipality of Šentjur in eastern Slovenia. It lies east of Dramlje and the Slovenian A1 motorway crosses the settlement's territory. The settlement, and the entire municipality, are included in the Savinja Statistical Region, which is in the Slovenian portion of the historical Duchy of Styria.
