= Bobovo pri Ponikvi =

- Location in Slovenia
- Coordinates: 46°15′58.5″N 15°29′27.26″E
- Country: Slovenia
- Traditional region: Styria
- Statistical region: Savinja
- Municipality: Šentjur

Area
  - Total: 1.86 km^{2} (0.72 sq mi)
- Elevation: 313.2 m (1,028 ft)

Population (2020)
  - Total: 61
  - Density: 33/km^{2} (85/sq mi)

Bobovo pri Ponikvi pronounced [bɔˈbɔːʋɔ pɾi ˈpoːnikʋi] is a settlement in the Municipality of Šentjur, in eastern Slovenia. The railway line from Ljubljana to Maribor runs along the northern edge of the settlement's territory. The settlement, and the entire municipality, are included in the Savinja Statistical Region, which is in the Slovenian portion of the historical Duchy of Styria.

== Name ==
The name of the settlement was changed from Bobovo to Bobovo pri Ponikvi in 1953.
