= Šedina =

- Location in Slovenia
- Coordinates: 46°16′41.51″N 15°24′15.14″E
- Country: Slovenia
- Traditional region: Styria
- Statistical region: Savinja
- Municipality: Šentjur

Area
  - Total: 0.85 km^{2} (0.33 sq mi)
- Elevation: 362.2 m (1,188 ft)

Population (2020)
  - Total: 105
  - Density: 120/km^{2} (320/sq mi)

Šedina (pronounced [ˈʃeːdina]) is a small settlement in the Municipality of Šentjur, eastern Slovenia. It lies just east of Dramlje. The A1 motorway runs along the southern edge of the settlement's territory. The settlement, and the entire municipality, are included in the Savinja Statistical Region, which is in the Slovenian portion of the historical Duchy of Styria.
