= Podpeč pri Šentvidu =

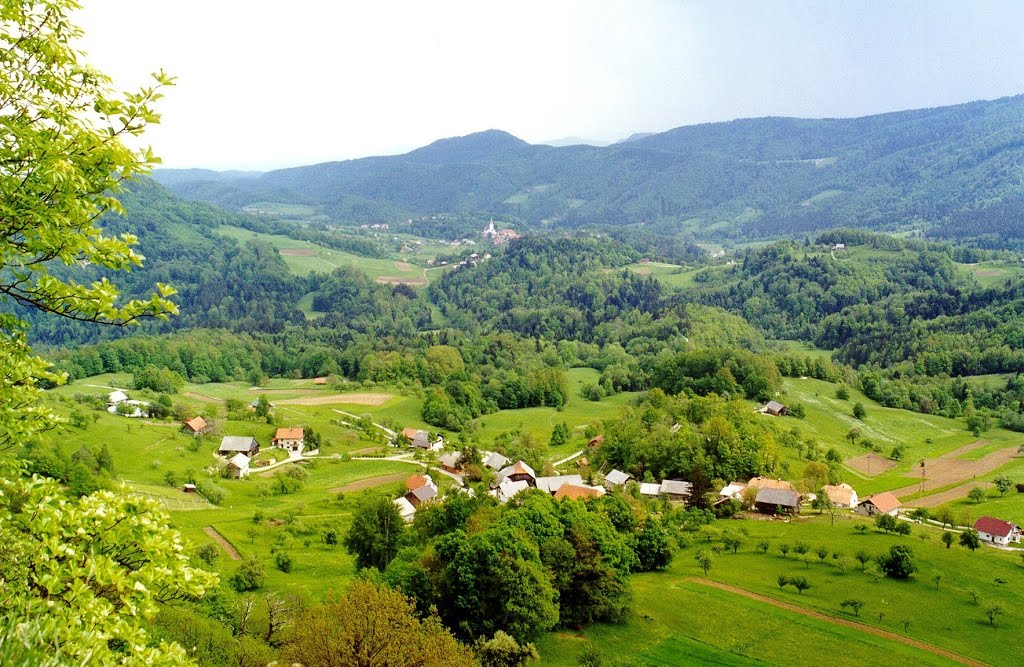

- Location in Slovenia
- Coordinates: 46°5′48.61″N 15°26′43.52″E
- Country: Slovenia
- Traditional region: Styria
- Statistical region: Savinja
- Municipality: Šentjur

Area
  - Total: 1.76 km^{2} (0.68 sq mi)
- Elevation: 541.2 m (1,776 ft)

Population (2020)
  - Total: 62
  - Density: 35/km^{2} (91/sq mi)

Podpeč pri Šentvidu (pronounced [pɔtˈpeːtʃ pɾi ʃɛnˈtʋiːdu] or [pɔtˈpeːtʃ pɾi ʃənˈtʋiːdu]) is a settlement just east of Šentvid pri Planini in the Municipality of Šentjur, eastern Slovenia. The settlement, and the entire municipality, are included in the Savinja Statistical Region, which is in the Slovenian portion of the historical Duchy of Styria.

== Name ==
The name of the settlement was changed from Podpeč to Podpeč pri Šentvidu in 1953.
