= Podgaj, Šentjur =

Podgaj Sveti Ožbalt (until 1955)
- Location in Slovenia
- Coordinates: 46°14′33.91″N 15°27′4.12″E
- Country: Slovenia
- Traditional region: Styria
- Statistical region: Savinja
- Municipality: Šentjur

Area
  - Total: 0.97 km^{2} (0.37 sq mi)
- Elevation: 314.9 m (1,033 ft)

Population (2020)
  - Total: 92
  - Density: 95/km^{2} (250/sq mi)

Podgaj (pronounced [pɔdˈɡaːi̯]) is a small settlement south of Ponikva in the Municipality of Šentjur in eastern Slovenia. The settlement, and the entire municipality, are included in the Savinja Statistical Region, which is in the Slovenian portion of the historical Duchy of Styria.

== Name ==
The name of the settlement was changed from Sveti Ožbalt (literally, 'Saint Oswald') to Podgaj (literally, 'below the grove') in 1955. The name was changed on the basis of the 1948 Law on Names of Settlements and Designations of Squares, Streets, and Buildings as part of efforts by Slovenia's postwar communist government to remove religious elements from toponyms.
