= Žegar, Šentjur =

Žegar
- Location in Slovenia
- Coordinates: 46°8′10.64″N 15°27′25.67″E
- Country: Slovenia
- Traditional region: Styria
- Statistical region: Savinja
- Municipality: Šentjur

Area
  - Total: 2.74 km^{2} (1.06 sq mi)
- Elevation: 505.1 m (1,657 ft)

Population (2020)
  - Total: 118
  - Density: 43.1/km^{2} (112/sq mi)

Žegar (pronounced [ˈʒeːɡaɾ], German: Scheger) is a settlement in the Municipality of Šentjur, eastern Slovenia. It lies just off the regional road leading southeast of the town of Šentjur, towards Kozje. The settlement, and the entire municipality, are included in the Savinja Statistical Region, which is in the Slovenian portion of the historical Duchy of Styria.
