= Primož pri Šentjurju =

Primož pri Šentjurju Sveti Primož (until 1955)
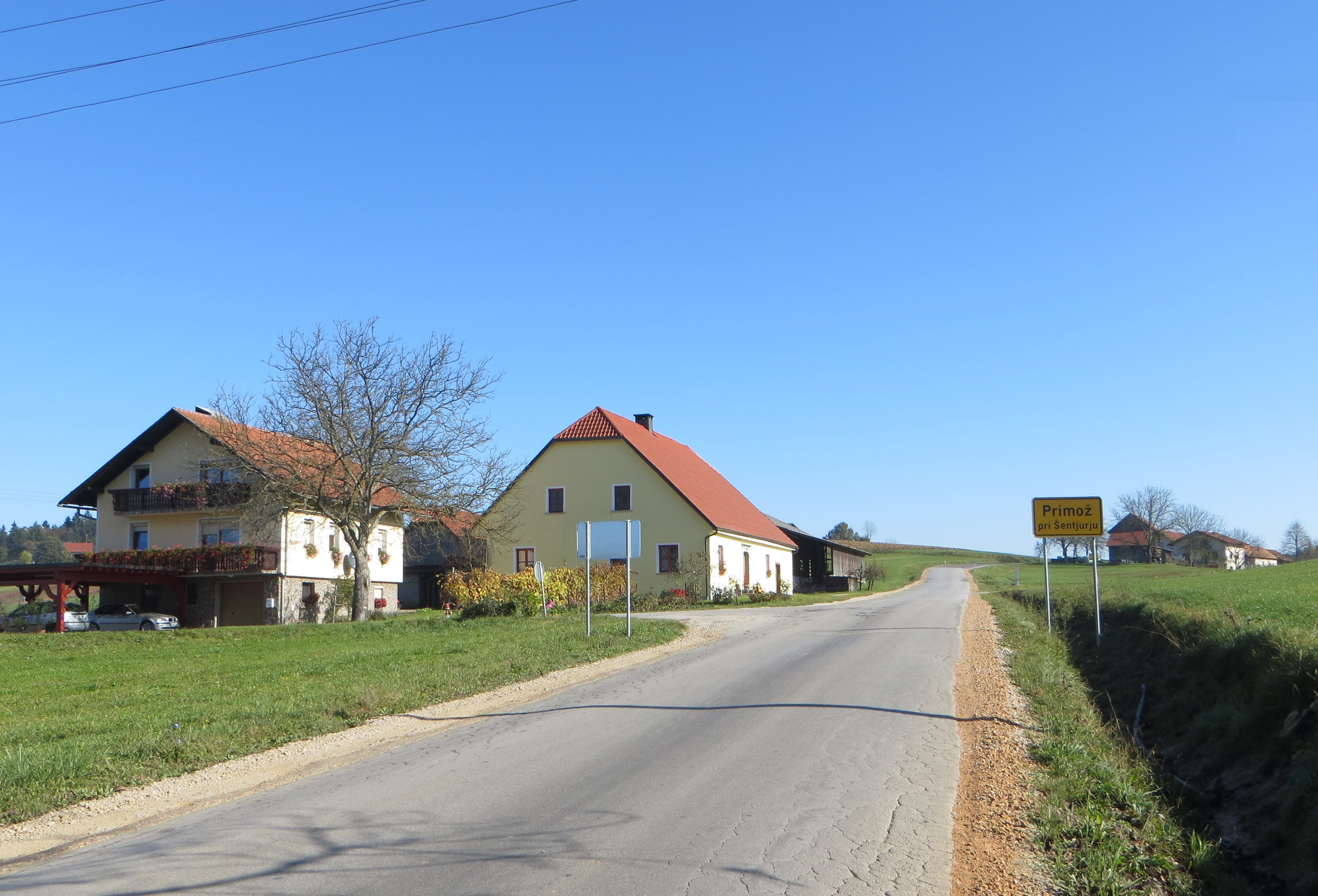

- Location in Slovenia
- Coordinates: 46°14′16.13″N 15°24′0.53″E
- Country: Slovenia
- Traditional region: Styria
- Statistical region: Savinja
- Municipality: Šentjur

Area
  - Total: 2.79 km^{2} (1.08 sq mi)
- Elevation: 288.9 m (948 ft)

Population (2020)
  - Total: 251
  - Density: 90.0/km^{2} (233/sq mi)

Primož pri Šentjurju (pronounced [ˈpɾiːmɔʃ pɾi ʃɛnˈtjuːɾju] or [ˈpɾiːmɔʃ pɾi ʃənˈtjuːɾju]) is a settlement in the Municipality of Šentjur, eastern Slovenia. The settlement, and the entire municipality, are included in the Savinja Statistical Region, which is in the Slovenian portion of the historical Duchy of Styria. The settlement includes the hamlets of Bozne, Brezne, Grabne, and Kote.

== Name ==
The name of the settlement was changed from Sveti Primož (literally, 'Saint Primus') to Primož pri Šentjurju (literally, 'Primus near Šentjur') in 1955. The name was changed on the basis of the 1948 Law on Names of Settlements and Designations of Squares, Streets, and Buildings as part of efforts by Slovenia's postwar communist government to remove religious elements from toponyms.

== History ==
The Roman road from Celeia to Poetovio ran past the settlement. A cache of weapons from antiquity has been found along the road.

== Church ==
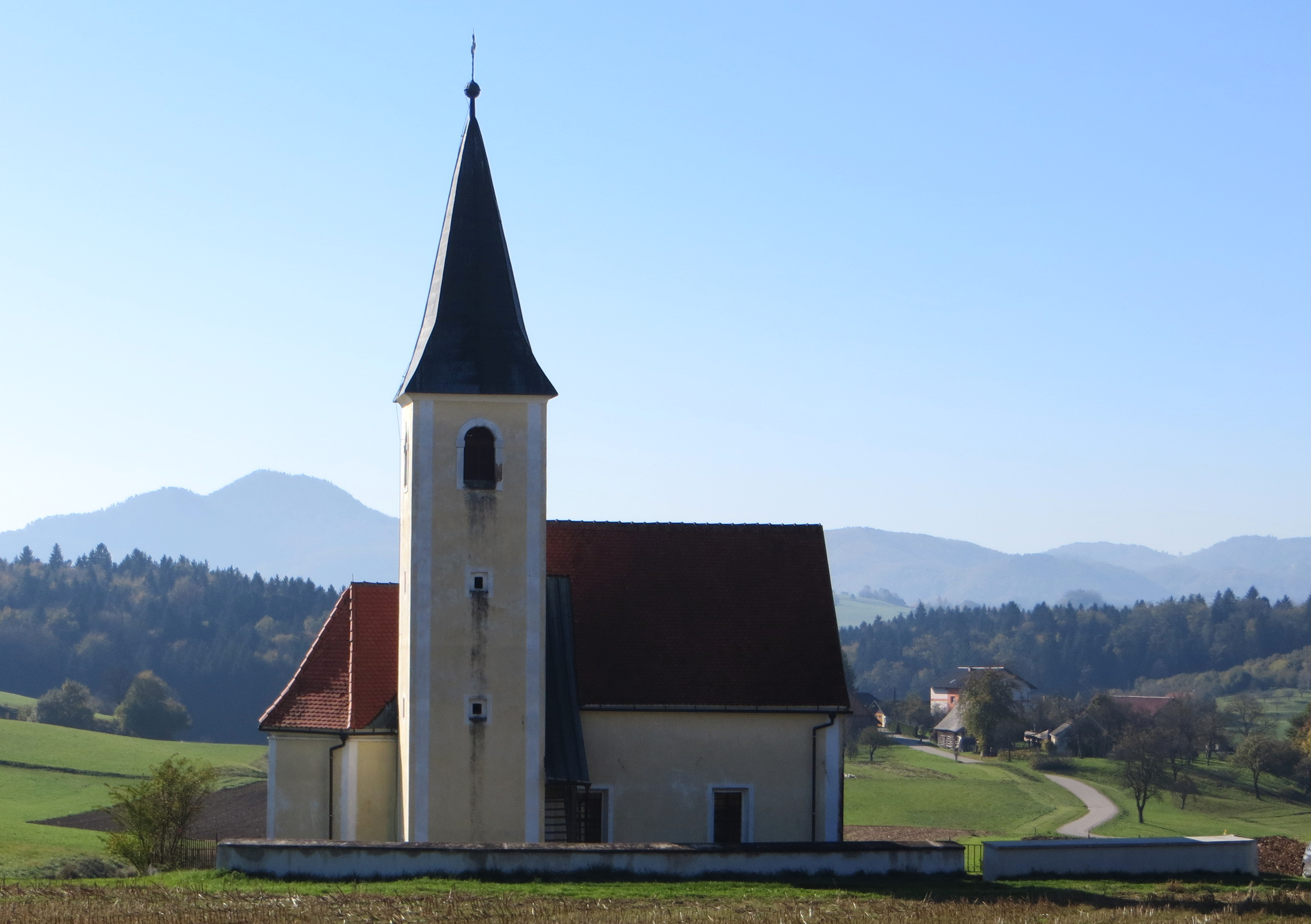
Sts. Primus and Felicianus Church

The local church from which the settlement gets its name is dedicated to Saint Primus and Felicianus and belongs to the Parish of Šentjur. It was built in the early 18th century on the site of a 15th-century predecessor. A church at the site was first mentioned in written sources in 1457, when annual fair rights were granted by Emperor Frederick III. The fair was moved to Šentjur in 1583, but then the two events were later combined at the church in Primož pri Šentjurju. The nave of the current structure was vaulted in the mid-18th century, and a bell tower was added in the first half of the 19th century. The main altar is from the second half of the 18th century, and the church also has a Baroque chalice from the mid-18th century. The side altars were created by Janez Rangus from Vojnik in 1853.

== Notable people ==
Notable people that were born or lived in Primož pri Šentjurju include:

- Franc Guzaj (or Guzej; 1839–1880), folk hero and outlaw
- Josip Povalej (1869–1944), financial specialist and lawyer
