= Dobje pri Lesičnem =

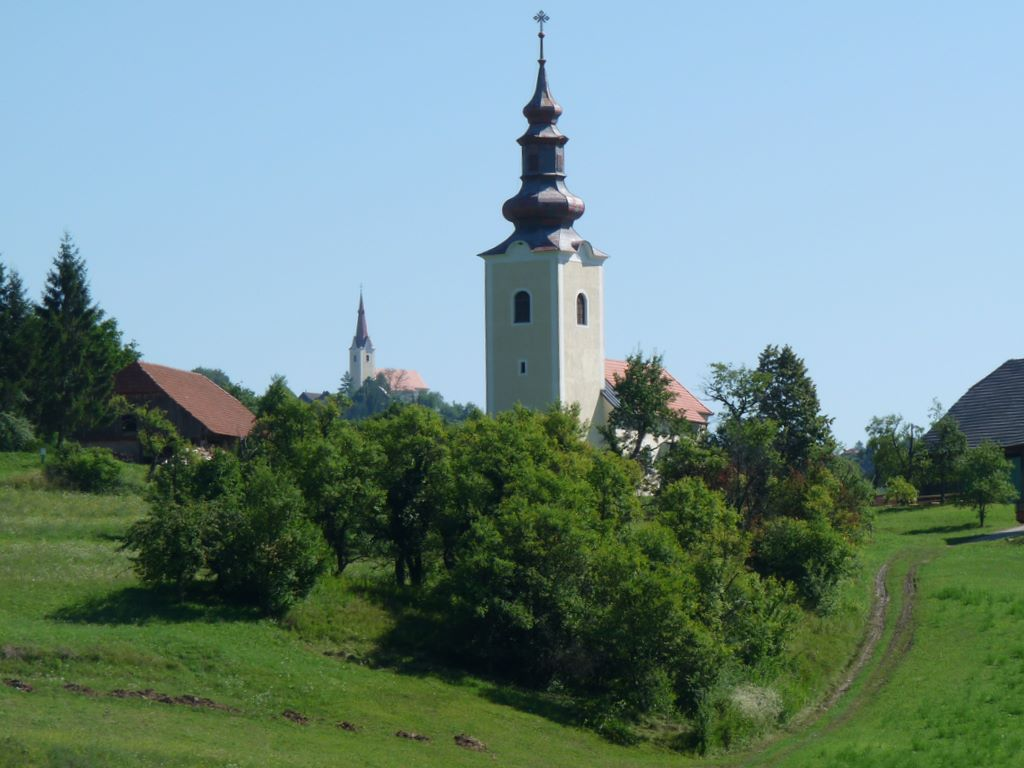

- Location in Slovenia
- Coordinates: 46°7′4.78″N 15°27′51.67″E
- Country: Slovenia
- Traditional region: Styria
- Statistical region: Savinja
- Municipality: Šentjur

Area
  - Total: 1.77 km^{2} (0.68 sq mi)
- Elevation: 450.7 m (1,479 ft)

Population (2020)
  - Total: 72
  - Density: 41/km^{2} (110/sq mi)

Dobje pri Lesičnem (pronounced [ˈdoːbjɛ pɾi lɛˈsiːtʃnɛm]) is a settlement in the Municipality of Šentjur, in eastern Slovenia. The settlement, and the entire municipality, are included in the Savinja Statistical Region, which is in the Slovenian portion of the historical Duchy of Styria.

== Name ==
The name of the settlement was changed from Dobje to Dobje pri Lesičnem in 1953.

== Church ==
The local church is dedicated to Saint Oswald (Slovene: sveti Ožbolt) and belongs to the Parish of Prevorje. It dates to the 15th century with major 19th-century rebuilding.
