= Vrbno, Šentjur =

Vrbno
- Location in Slovenia
- Coordinates: 46°12′57.12″N 15°22′20.1″E
- Country: Slovenia
- Traditional region: Styria
- Statistical region: Savinja
- Municipality: Šentjur

Area
  - Total: 1.91 km^{2} (0.74 sq mi)
- Elevation: 257.4 m (844 ft)

Population (2020)
  - Total: 385
  - Density: 202/km^{2} (522/sq mi)

Vrbno (pronounced [ˈʋəɾbnɔ]) is one of the most populous settlements in the Municipality of Šentjur, eastern Slovenia. It lies on the right bank of the Voglajna River, on the regional road leading west out of the town of Šentjur towards Celje. The settlement, and the entire municipality, are included in the Savinja Statistical Region, which is in the Slovenian portion of the historical Duchy of Styria.
