= Podpeč nad Marofom =

- Location in Slovenia
- Coordinates: 46°6′21.84″N 15°22′51.88″E
- Country: Slovenia
- Traditional region: Styria
- Statistical region: Savinja
- Municipality: Šentjur

Area
  - Total: 1.58 km^{2} (0.61 sq mi)
- Elevation: 581.7 m (1,908 ft)

Population (2020)
  - Total: 23
  - Density: 15/km^{2} (38/sq mi)

Podpeč nad Marofom (pronounced [pɔtˈpeːtʃ nat ˈmaːɾɔfɔm]) is a small settlement west of Planina pri Sevnici in the Municipality of Šentjur, eastern Slovenia. The settlement, and the entire municipality, are included in the Savinja Statistical Region, which is in the Slovenian portion of the historical Duchy of Styria.

== Name ==
The name of the settlement was changed from Podpeč to Podpeč nad Marofom in 1953.
