= Trnovec pri Dramljah =

- Location in Slovenia
- Coordinates: 46°15′22.34″N 15°23′22.25″E
- Country: Slovenia
- Traditional region: Styria
- Statistical region: Savinja
- Municipality: Šentjur

Area
  - Total: 1.11 km^{2} (0.43 sq mi)
- Elevation: 290.5 m (953 ft)

Population (2020)
  - Total: 145
  - Density: 131/km^{2} (338/sq mi)

Trnovec pri Dramljah (pronounced [ˈtəɾnɔːʋəts pɾi ˈdɾaːmljax]) is a settlement in the Municipality of Šentjur, eastern Slovenia. It lies south of Dramlje, just off the regional road to the town of Šentjur. The settlement, and the entire municipality, are included in the Savinja Statistical Region, which is in the Slovenian portion of the historical Duchy of Styria.

== Name ==
The name of the settlement was changed from Trnovec to Trnovec pri Dramljah in 1955.
