= Šibenik, Šentjur =

Šibenik
- Location in Slovenia
- Coordinates: 46°12′5.52″N 15°22′49.14″E
- Country: Slovenia
- Traditional region: Styria
- Statistical region: Savinja
- Municipality: Šentjur

Area
  - Total: 1.94 km^{2} (0.75 sq mi)
- Elevation: 331 m (1,086 ft)

Population (2020)
  - Total: 94
  - Density: 48/km^{2} (130/sq mi)

Šibenik (pronounced [ˈʃiːbɛnik]) is a settlement in the Municipality of Šentjur, eastern Slovenia. Šibenik is a dispersed settlement, in the hills immediately south of the town of Šentjur. The settlement, and the entire municipality, are included in the Savinja Statistical Region, which is in the Slovenian portion of the historical Duchy of Styria.
