= Turno, Šentjur =

Turno
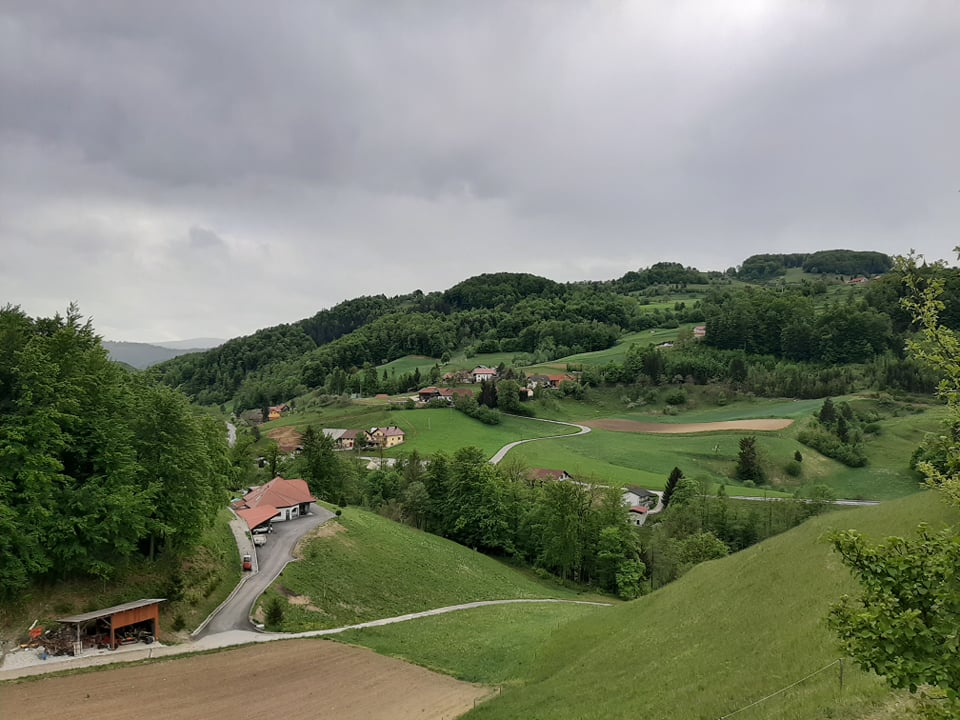

- Location in Slovenia
- Coordinates: 46°10′54.76″N 15°26′30.61″E
- Country: Slovenia
- Traditional region: Styria
- Statistical region: Savinja
- Municipality: Šentjur

Area
  - Total: 1.47 km^{2} (0.57 sq mi)
- Elevation: 439.4 m (1,442 ft)

Population (2020)
  - Total: 104
  - Density: 70.7/km^{2} (183/sq mi)

Turno (pronounced [ˈtuːɾnɔ]) is a settlement in the Municipality of Šentjur in eastern Slovenia. It lies south of Gorica pri Slivnici, just off the regional road leading to Kozje. The settlement, and the entire municipality, are included in the Savinja Statistical Region, which is in the Slovenian portion of the historical Duchy of Styria.
