= Kalobje =

- Location in Slovenia
- Coordinates: 46°10′10.06″N 15°23′34.02″E
- Country: Slovenia
- Traditional region: Styria
- Statistical region: Savinja
- Municipality: Šentjur

Area
  - Total: 0.56 km^{2} (0.22 sq mi)
- Elevation: 600 m (2,000 ft)

Population (2020)
  - Total: 81
  - Density: 140/km^{2} (370/sq mi)

Kalobje (pronounced [ˈkaːlɔbjɛ]) is a village in the Municipality of Šentjur, in eastern Slovenia. The settlement, and the entire municipality, are included in the Savinja Statistical Region, which is in the Slovenian portion of the historical Duchy of Styria.

Kalobje is known for the Kalobje manuscript (Slovene: Kalobški rokopis), an important collection of Slovenian Baroque poetry.

== Church ==
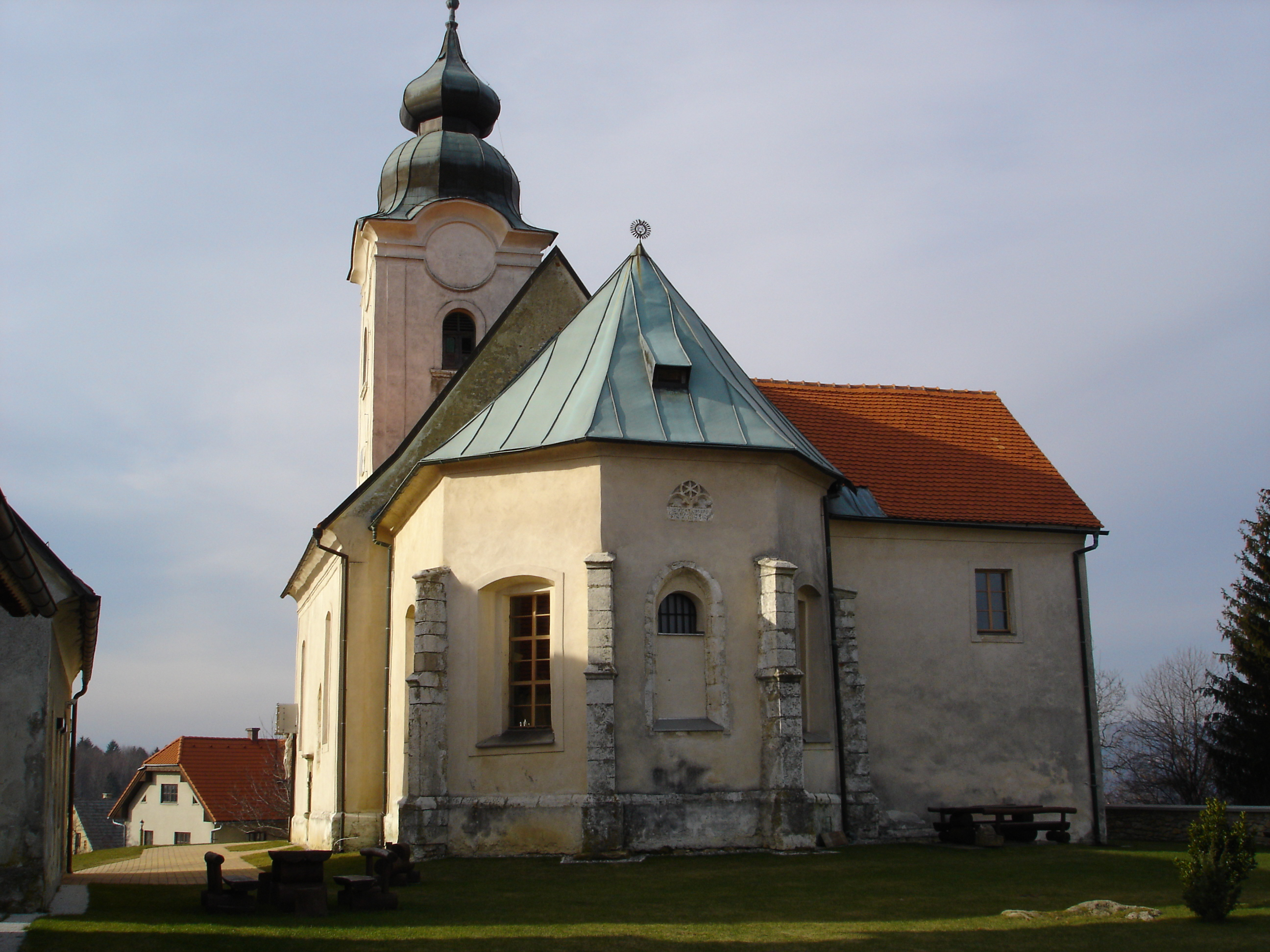
Holy Name of Mary Parish Church in Kalobje

The parish church in the settlement is dedicated to the Holy Name of Mary and belongs to the Roman Catholic Diocese of Celje. It was originally a 16th-century building that was restyled in the 17th and 18th centuries.
