= List of medical doctors =

This is a list of famous medical doctors in history.

== Chronological lists ==
- List of ancient physicians
- List of post-classical physicians

== Doctors famous for their role in advancement of medicine ==
- William Osler Abbott (1902–1943) – co-developed the Miller-Abbott tube
- William Stewart Agras (born 1929) – feeding behavior
- Virginia Apgar (1909–1974) – anesthesiologist who devised the Apgar score used after childbirth
- Jean Astruc (1684–1766) – wrote one of the first treatises on syphilis
- Averroes (1126–1198) – Andalusian polymath
- Avicenna (980–1037) – Persian physician
- Gerbrand Bakker (1771–1828) – Dutch physician, with works in Dutch and Latin on midwifery, practical surgery, animal magnetism, worms, the human eye, comparative anatomy, and the anatomy of the brain
- Frederick Banting (1891–1941) – isolated insulin
- Christiaan Barnard (1922–2001) – performed first heart transplant
- Charles Best (1899–1978) – assisted in the discovery of insulin
- Norman Bethune (1890–1939) – developer of battlefield surgical techniques
- Theodor Billroth (1829–1894) – father of modern abdominal surgery
- Elizabeth Blackwell (1821–1910) – first woman to receive a medical degree in the United States; first openly identified woman to receive a medical degree; pioneered the advancement of women in medicine
- Alfred Blalock (1899–1964) – noted for his research on the medical condition of shock and the development of the Blalock-Taussig Shunt, surgical relief of the cyanosis from Tetralogy of Fallot, known commonly as the blue baby syndrome, with his assistant Vivien Thomas and pediatric cardiologist Helen Taussig
- James Carson (1772–1843)
- Charaka (c. 100 BCE – 200 CE) – Indian physician
- Jean-Martin Charcot (1825–1893) – pioneering neurologist
- Guy de Chauliac (1290–1368) – one of the first physicians to have an experimental approach towards medicine; also recorded the Black Death
- Anna Manning Comfort (1845–1931) – first woman medical graduate to practice in the state of Connecticut
- Loren Cordain (born 1950) – American nutritionist and exercise physiologist, Paleolithic diet
- Harvey Cushing (1869–1939) – American neurosurgeon; father of modern-day brain surgery
- Garcia de Orta (1501–1568) – revealed herbal medicines of India, described cholera
- Gerhard Domagk (1895–1964) – pathologist and bacteriologist; credited with the discovery of sulfonamidochrysoidine (KI-730), the first commercially available antibiotic; won 1939 the Nobel Prize in Physiology or Medicine
- Charles R. Drew (1904–1950) – blood transfusion pioneer
- Helen Flanders Dunbar (1902–1959) – important early figure in U.S. psychosomatic medicine
- Galen (129–c. 210) – Roman physician and anatomist
- Paul Ehrlich (1854–1915) – German scientist; won the 1908 Nobel Prize in Physiology or Medicine; developed Ehrlich's reagent
- Christiaan Eijkman (1858–1930) – pathologist, studied beriberi
- Pierre Fauchard – father of dentistry
- René Gerónimo Favaloro (1923–2000) – Argentine cardiac surgeon who created the coronary bypass grafting procedure
- Alexander Fleming (1881–1955) – Scottish scientist, inventor of penicillin
- Girolamo Fracastoro (1478–1553) – wrote on syphilis, forerunner of germ theory
- Sigmund Freud (1856–1939) – founder of psychoanalysis
- Daniel Carleton Gajdusek (1923–2008) – studied Kuru, Nobel Prize winner
- George E. Goodfellow (1855–1910) – recognized as first U.S. civilian trauma surgeon, expert in gunshot wound treatment
- Henry Gray (1827–1861) – English anatomist and surgeon, creator of Gray's Anatomy
- Ernst Haeckel (1834–1919) – physician and anatomist
- William Harvey (1578–1657) – English physician, described the circulatory system
- Henry Heimlich (1920–2016) – inventor of the Heimlich maneuver and the Vietnam War-era chest drain valve
- Orvan Hess (1906–2002) – fetal heart monitor and first successful use of penicillin
- Hippocrates (c. 460–370 BCE) – Greek father of medicine
- John Hunter (1728–1793) – father of modern surgery, famous for his study of anatomy
- Kurt Julius Isselbacher (1928–2019) – Former editor of Harrison's Principles of Internal Medicine, prominent Gastroenterologist, founder of the Massachusetts General Hospital Cancer Center, Association of American Physicians Kober Medal winner
- Edward Jenner (1749–1823) – English physician popularized vaccination
- Elliott P. Joslin (1869–1962) – pioneer in the treatment of diabetes
- Carl Jung (1875–1961) – Swiss psychiatrist
- Leo Kanner (1894–1981) – Austrian-American psychiatrist known for work on autism
- Seymour Kety (1915–2000) – American neuroscientist
- Robert Koch (1843–1910) – formulated Koch's postulates
- Theodor Kocher (1841–1917) – thyroid surgery; first surgeon to win the Nobel Prize
- Rene Theophile Hyacinthe Laennec (1781–1826) – inventor of the stethoscope
- Janet Lane-Claypon (1877–1967) – pioneer of epidemiology
- Thomas Linacre (1460–1524) – founder of Royal College of Physicians
- Joseph Lister (1827–1912) – pioneer of antiseptic surgery
- Richard Lower (1631–1691) – studied the lungs and heart, and performed the first blood transfusion
- Paul Loye (1861–1890) – studied the nervous system and decapitation
- Wilhelm Frederick von Ludwig (1790–1865) – German physician known for his 1836 publication on the condition now known as Ludwig's angina
- Amato Lusitano (1511–1568) – discovered venous valves, studied blood circulation
- Madhav (8th century A.D.) – medical text author and systematizer
- Maimonides (1135–1204)
- Marcello Malpighi (1628–1694) – Italian anatomist, pioneer in histology
- Barry Marshall (born 1951)
- Charles Horace Mayo (1865–1939) – co-founder, Mayo Clinic
- William James Mayo (1861–1939) – co-founder, Mayo Clinic
- William Worrall Mayo (1819–1911) – co-founder, Mayo Clinic
- Salvador Mazza (1886–1946) – Argentine epidemiologist who helped in controlling American trypanosomiasis
- William McBride (1927–2018) – discovered teratogenicity of thalidomide
- Otto Fritz Meyerhof (1884–1951) – studied muscle metabolism; Nobel prize
- George Richards Minot (1885–1950) – Nobel prize for his study of anemia
- B. K. Misra – first neurosurgeon in the world to perform image-guided surgery for aneurysms, first in South Asia to perform stereotactic radiosurgery, first in India to perform awake craniotomy and laparoscopic spine surgery.
- Frederic E. Mohs (1910–2002) – responsible for the method of surgery now called Mohs surgery
- Egas Moniz (1874–1955) – developed lobotomy and brain artery angiography
- Richard Morton (1637–1698) – identified tubercles in consumption (phthisis) of lungs; basis for modern name tuberculosis
- Herbert Needleman (1927–2017) – scientifically established link between lead poisoning and neurological damage; key figure in successful efforts to limit lead exposure
- Charles Jean Henri Nicolle (1866–1936) – microbiologist who won Nobel prize for work on typhus
- Ian Olver (born 1953)
- Gary Onik (born 1952) – inventor and pioneer of ultrasound guided cryosurgery for both the prostate and the liver
- William Osler (1849–1919) – "father of modern medicine"
- Ralph Paffenbarger (1922–2007) – conducted classic studies demonstrating conclusively that active people reduce their risk of heart disease and live longer
- George Papanicolaou (1883–1962) – Greek pioneer in cytopathology and early cancer detection; inventor of the Pap smear
- Paracelsus (1493–1541) – founder of toxicology
- Ambroise Paré (1510–1590) – advanced surgical wound treatment
- Wilder Penfield (1891–1976) – pioneer in neurology
- Marcus Raichle (born 1937) – father of functional neuroimaging
- Santiago Ramón y Cajal (1852–1934) – father of modern neuroscience for his development of the neuron theory
- Joseph Ransohoff (1915–2001) – neurosurgeon who invented the modern technique for removing brain tumors
- Sir William Refshauge (1913–2009) – Australian public health administrator
- Rhazes (c. 865–925) (Abu Bakr Mohammad Ibn Zakariya al-Razi)
- Juan Rosai (1940–2020) – advanced surgical pathology; discovered the desmoplastic small round cell tumor and Rosai–Dorfman disease
- Jonas Salk (1914–1995) – developed a vaccine for polio
- Lall Sawh (born 1951) – Trinidadian surgeon/urologist and pioneer of kidney transplantation in the Caribbean
- Martin Schurig (1656–1733) – first physician to occupy himself with the anatomy of the sexual organs.
- Ignaz Semmelweis (1818–1865) – a pioneer of avoiding cross-infection – introduced hand washing and instrument cleaning
- Victor Skumin (born 1948) – first to describe a previously unknown disease, now called Skumin syndrome (a disorder of the central nervous system of some patients after receiving a prosthetic heart valve)
- John Snow (1813–1858) – anaesthetist and pioneer epidemiologist who studied cholera
- Thomas Starzl (1926–2017) – performed the first liver transplant
- Andrew Taylor Still (1828–1917) – father of osteopathic medicine
- Susruta (c. 500 BCE) – Indian physician and pioneering surgeon
- Thomas Sydenham (1642–1689) – clinician
- James Mourilyan Tanner (1920–2010) – developed Tanner stages and advanced auxology
- Helen B. Taussig (1898–1986) – founded field of pediatric cardiology, worked to prevent thalidomide marketing in the US
- Jeannette Throckmorton (1883–1963) – served as librarian of the Iowa State Medical Library for almost 34 years
- Carlo Urbani (1956–2003) – discovered and died from SARS
- Andreas Vesalius (1514–1564) – Belgian anatomist, often referred to as the founder of modern human anatomy
- Vidus Vidius (1508–1569) – first professor of medicine at the College Royal and author of medical texts
- Rudolf Virchow (1821–1902) – German pathologist, founder of fields of comparative pathology and cellular pathology
- Carl Warburg (1805–1892) – German/British physician and clinical pharmacologist, inventor of Warburg's Tincture, a famed antipyretic and antimalarial medicine of the Victorian era
- Otto Heinrich Warburg (1883–1970) – German physiologist, medical doctor; Nobel prize 1931
- Allen Oldfather Whipple (1881–1963) – devised the Whipple procedure in 1935 for treatment of pancreatic cancer
- Priscilla White (1900–1989) – developed classification of diabetes mellitus and pregnancy to assess and reduce the risk of miscarriage, birth defect, stillbirth, and maternal death
- Carl Wood (1929–2011) – developed and commercialized in-vitro fertilization
- Alfred Worcester (1855–1951) – pioneer in geriatrics, palliative care, appendectomy, cesarean section, student health, nursing education
- Ole Wormius (1588–1654) – pioneer in embryology
- Sir Magdi Yacoub (born 1935) – one of the leading developers of the techniques of heart and heart-lung transplantation
- Boris Yegorov (1937–1994) – first physician in space (1964)
- Zhang Xichun (1860–1933) – first doctor to integrate Chinese and Western medicine

== Doctors famous chiefly as eponyms ==
Among the better known eponyms:

- Thomas Addison (1793–1860) – Addison's disease
- Alois Alzheimer (1864–1915) – Alzheimer's disease
- Hans Asperger (1906–1980) – Asperger syndrome
- John Brereton Barlow (1924–2008) – Barlow's syndrome
- Karl Adolph von Basedow (1799–1854) – Basedow disease
- Hulusi Behçet (1889–1948) – Behçet's disease
- Paul Broca (1824–1880) – Broca's area
- David Bruce (1855–1931) – Brucellosis
- Denis Parsons Burkitt (1911–1993) – Burkitt lymphoma
- Albert Calmette (1863–1933) – Bacillus Calmette-Guérin (BCG), a vaccine for tuberculosis
- Carlos Chagas (1879–1934) – Chagas disease
- Jean-Martin Charcot (1825–1893) – Maladie de Charcot, Charcot joints, Charcot's triad, Charcot-Marie-Tooth disease
- Jerome W. Conn (1907–1981) – Conn's Syndrome (primary hyperaldosteronism)
- Burrill Bernard Crohn (1884–1983) – Crohn's disease
- Harvey Cushing (1869–1939) – Cushing's disease
- John Langdon Down (1828–1896) – Down syndrome
- Bartolomeo Eustachi (c. 1500–1510 – 1574) – Eustachian tube
- Gabriele Falloppio (1522/23 – 1562) – Fallopian tube
- Camillo Golgi (1843–1926) – Golgi apparatus
- Ernst Gräfenberg (1881–1957) – Gräfenberg spot (G-spot)
- Joseph-Ignace Guillotin (1738–1814) – guillotine
- Gerhard Armauer Hansen (1841–1912) – Hansen's disease
- Thomas Hodgkin (1798–1866) – Hodgkin's disease
- George Huntington (1850–1916) – Huntington's disease
- Moritz Kaposi (1837–1902) – Kaposi's sarcoma
- Wilhelm Frederick von Ludwig (1790–1865) – Ludwig's angina
- Charles Mantoux (1877–1947) – Mantoux test for tuberculosis
- Antoine Marfan (1858–1942) – Marfan syndrome
- Silas Weir Mitchell (1829–1914) – Mitchell's disease
- James Paget (1814–1899) – Paget's disease
- James Parkinson (1755–1824) – Parkinson's syndrome
- Juan Rosai (1940–2020) – Rosai–Dorfman disease
- Daniel Elmer Salmon (1850–1914) – Salmonella
- Liliane Schnitzler (born 1938) – Schnitzler syndrome
- Gunnar B. Stickler (1925–2010) – Stickler syndrome
- Georges Gilles de la Tourette (1857–1904) – Tourette syndrome
- Max Wilms (1867–1918) – Wilms' tumor
- Samuel Alexander Kinnier Wilson (1878–1937) – Wilson's disease

== Doctors famous as criminals ==
- John Bodkin Adams – British general practitioner; suspected serial killer, thought to have killed over 160 patients; acquitted of one murder in 1957 but convicted of prescription fraud, not keeping a dangerous drug register, obstructing a police search and lying on cremation forms
- Karl Brandt (1904–1948) – Nazi human experimentation
- Edme Castaing – murderer
- George Chapman – Polish poisoner and Jack the Ripper suspect
- Robert George Clements – murderer
- Nigel Cox – only British doctor to be convicted of attempted euthanasia
- Thomas Neill Cream – murderer
- Hawley Harvey Crippen – executed for his wife's murder
- Baruch Goldstein (1956–1994) – assassin
- Linda Hazzard – convicted of murdering one patient but suspected of 12 in total
- H.H. Holmes – American serial killer
- Shirō Ishii – headed Japan's Unit 731 during World War II which conducted human experimentation for weapons and medical research
- Mario Jascalevich – killed 9 hospital patients using curare
- Radovan Karadžić (born 1945) – convicted of genocide, crimes against humanity, and war crimes in Yugoslavia
- Jack Kevorkian (1923–2011) – convicted of second-degree murder, Michigan, April 13, 1999
- Jeffrey R. MacDonald – murdered a pregnant wife and two daughters in 1979
- Josef Mengele (1911–1979) – known as the Angel of Death; Nazi human experimentation
- Samuel Mudd (1833–1883) – condemned to prison for setting the leg of Abraham Lincoln's assassin
- Herman Webster Mudgett (1860–1896) – American serial killer
- Conrad Murray – convicted of involuntary manslaughter in death of pop star Michael Jackson
- Arnfinn Nesset – Norwegian serial killer
- William Palmer – British poisoner
- Marcel Petiot – French serial killer
- Herta Oberheuser (1911–1978) – Nazi human experimentation
- Richard J. Schmidt – American physician who contaminated his girlfriend with AIDS-tainted blood
- Harold Shipman (1946–2004) – British serial killer
- Michael Swango (born 1953) – American serial killer
- An A-Z list of Wikipedia articles of Nazi doctors

== Doctors famous as writers ==
Among the better known writers:

- Mary A. Brinkman (1846–1932) – American homeopathic physician and medical writer
- Mikhail Bulgakov (1891–1940) – Russian novelist and playwright
- Louis-Ferdinand Celine (1894–1961) – French novelist, author of Journey to the End of the Night
- Graham Chapman (1941–1989) – writer and actor, founding member of Monty Python
- Anton Chekhov (1860–1904) – Russian playwright
- Robin Cook – American author of bestselling novels, wrote Coma
- Michael Crichton (1942–2008) – American author of Jurassic Park
- A. J. Cronin (1896–1981) – Scottish novelist and essayist, author of The Citadel
- Anthony Daniels (born 1949) – as 'Theodore Dalrymple' and under his own name, a British author, critic and social and cultural commentator
- Sir Arthur Conan Doyle (1859–1930) – British author of Sherlock Holmes fame
- Khaled Hosseini (born 1965) – American author, originally from Afghanistan, of bestselling novels The Kite Runner and A Thousand Splendid Suns
- John Keats (1795–1821) – English poet
- Morio Kita – Japanese novelist and essayist; son of Mokichi Saitō
- Jean Baptiste Lefebvre de Villebrune (1732–1809) – French physician who translated several works from Latin, English, Spanish, Italian, and German into French
- Luke the Evangelist – one of the four Gospel writers of the Bible
- John S. Marr – proposed natural explanations for the ten plagues of Egypt
- W. Somerset Maugham (1874–1965) – British novelist and short story writer, wrote Of Human Bondage
- Alfred de Musset (1810–1857) – French playwright, discovered sign of syphilitic aortitis
- Taslima Nasrin
- Mori Ōgai – Japanese novelist, poet, and literary critic
- Walker Percy (1916–1990) – American philosopher and writer
- François Rabelais (1483–1553) – French author of Gargantua and Pantagruel
- Mokichi Saitō – Japanese poet
- Friedrich von Schiller (1759–1805), German writer, poet, essayist and dramatist
- William Carlos Williams (1883–1963) – American poet and essayist

And others:

- Patrick Abercromby (1656–c. 1716) – historian
- Chris Adrian
- Giorgio Antonucci (1933–2017) – Italian physician and poet, known for his questioning of the bases of psychiatry
- Jacob Appel – short story writer
- John Arbuthnot
- Janet Asimov (1926–2019) (née Janet O. Jeppson) – American psychiatrist, wife of Isaac Asimov
- Arnie Baker – cycling coach
- Cora Belle Brewster (1859–?), writer, editor
- Sir Thomas Browne (1605–1682) – British writer
- Georg Büchner – German dramatist
- Ludwig Büchner – German philosopher
- Thomas Campion – poet, composer
- Ethan Canin – novelist, short story writer
- Deepak Chopra – Indian/American writer of self-help and health books
- Alex Comfort (1920–2000) – British writer and poet, author of The Joy of Sex
- Ctesias (5th century B.C.) – Greek historian
- Steven Clark Cunningham (born 1972) – children's poem writer
- Erasmus Darwin (1731–1802) – British poet, grandfather of Charles Darwin
- Georges Duhamel (1884–1966) – French writer, dramatist, poet and humanist
- Havelock Ellis (1859–1940) – British writer and poet, author of The Psychology of Sex
- Viktor Frankl (1905–1997) – Austrian neurologist and psychiatrist, author of Man's Search for Meaning
- Samuel Garth (1661–1719) – British author and translator of classics
- Elmina M. Roys Gavitt (1828–1898) – American physician; medical journal founder, editor-in-chief
- Atul Gawande – surgeon and New Yorker medical writer
- William Gilbert – British author; father of W. S. Gilbert
- Oliver Goldsmith – British author
- Oliver Wendell Holmes Sr. (1809–1894) – American essayist
- Richard Hooker – author of M*A*S*H
- Arthur Johnston (1587–1641) – poet
- Eunice D. Kinney (1851–1942) – Canadian-born American physician, journal editor
- Charles Krauthammer (1950–2018) – American psychiatrist, syndicated political columnist
- R. D. Laing – Scottish writer and poet, leader of the anti-psychiatry movement
- Stanisław Lem (1929–2006) – Polish author of science-fiction (Solaris)
- Carlo Levi (1902–1975) – Italian novelist and writer
- David Livingstone (1813–1873) – Scottish medical missionary, explorer of Africa, travel writer
- Adeline Yen Mah – Chinese-American author
- Paolo Mantegazza (1831–1910) – Italian writer, author of science fiction book L'Anno 3000
- Jean-Paul Marat (1743–1793) – French writer, a leader of French Revolution; assassinated in bathtub
- Silas Weir Mitchell (1829–1914) – American writer
- Mungo Park – Scottish doctor and explorer
- Hakim Syed Zillur Rahman – Indian author and translator of classical manuscripts
- José Rizal (1861–1896) – Filipino novelist, scientist, linguist, and national hero
- João Guimarães Rosa – Brazilian writer
- Sir Ronald Ross (1857–1932) – British writer and poet, discovered the malarial parasite
- Theodore Isaac Rubin (1923–2019) – American author of David and Lisa
- Oliver Sacks (1933–2015) – British essayist (The Man Who Mistook his Wife for a Hat)
- Albert Schweitzer (1875–1965) – German charitative worker, Nobel Peace Prize laureate (1952), theologian, philosopher, organist, musicologist
- Julia Seton (1862–1950) – American physician, lecturer, New Thought writer
- Frank Slaughter (1908–2001) – American bestseller author, wrote (Doctor's Wives)
- Tobias Smollett (1721–1771) – author
- Benjamin Spock (1903–1988) – American pediatrician, wrote Baby and Child Care
- Patrick Taylor – Canadian best-selling novelist
- Osamu Tezuka – Japanese cartoonist and animator; the "father of anime"
- Lewis Thomas (1913–1993) – American essayist and poet
- Sir Henry Thompson – British surgeon and polymath
- Vladislav Vančura (1891–1942) – Czech writer, screenwriter and film director
- Drauzio Varella – Brazilian educator, scientist and medical science popularizer
- Francis Brett Young (1884–1954) – English novelist and poet
- Vinay Kumar,psychiatrist, author and Poet.

== Doctors famous as politicians ==
- Sali Berisha – President (1992–1997) and Prime Minister(2005–2013) of Albania
- Dipu Moni – Bangladeshi Minister of Education
- Nazira Abdula – Mozambican Minister of Health
- Ayad Allawi – interim Prime Minister of Iraq
- Salvador Allende (1908–1973) – Chilean president
- Emilio Álvarez Montalván – Foreign Minister of Nicaragua
- Arnulfo Arias – Panamanian President
- Firdous Ashiq Awan – Pakistani politician
- Bashar al-Assad – Syrian national leader
- Michelle Bachelet (born 1951) – Chilean president
- Hastings Kamuzu Banda (1898–1997) – Prime Minister, President and later dictator of Malawi
- Gro Harlem Brundtland (born 1939) – first Norwegian female prime minister; Director-General of the World Health Organization
- Margaret Chan – Director General of the WHO; former Director of Health of Hong Kong
- Chen Chi-mai – former mayor of Kaohsiung, Taiwan
- York Chow – Secretary for Health, Welfare and Food of Hong Kong
- Denzil Douglas – Prime Ministers of Saint Kitts and Nevis, 1995–2015
- François Duvalier (1907–1971) – also known as Papa Doc; President and later dictator of Haiti
- Antônio Palocci Filho – Brazilian politician, Finance Minister
- Christian Friedrich, Baron von Stockmar – Anglo-Belgian statesman
- Che Guevara – Latin American revolutionary leader
- George Habash – founder of the Popular Front for the Liberation of Palestine
- Ibrahim al-Jaafari – Prime minister of Iraq
- Radovan Karadžić (born 1945) – first president of Republika Srpska, now facing charges for genocide and crimes against humanity
- Mohammad-Reza Khatami – Iranian politician
- Ewa Kopacz – Polish Prime Minister who succeeded Donald Tusk, 2014–2015
- Juscelino Kubitscheck – Brazilian president
- Mahathir Mohamad – Malaysian prime minister
- Agostinho Neto (1922–1979) – MPLA leader and president of Angola
- Navin Ramgoolam – Prime minister of Mauritius
- Lloyd Richardson – President of the Parliament of Sint Maarten, 2014–2015
- José Rizal (1861–1896) – Filipino revolutionary and national hero
- Bidhan Chandra Roy – Indian politician
- Sun Yat-sen (1866–1925) – founder of the Republic of China
- Tabaré Vázquez – former Uruguayan President
- Ali Akbar Velayati (born 1945) – Iranian Foreign Minister, 1981–1997
- Ursula von der Leyen (born 1958) – German Federal Minister of Defence, 13th president of the European Commission
- William Walker (1824–1860) – ruler of Nicaragua
- Ram Baran Yadav (born 1948) – first elected president of the republic of Nepal
- Yeoh Eng-kiong – former Secretary for Health and Welfare of Hong Kong

=== Argentina ===
- Luis Agote (1868–1954)
- Nicolas Bazan (born 1942)
- Hermes Binner
- Eduardo Braun-Menéndez (1903–1959)
- Ramón Carrillo (1906–1956)
- Bernardo Houssay (1887–1971)
- René Favaloro (1923–2000)
- Arturo Umberto Illia – 35th President of Argentina (1963–1966)
- Luis Federico Leloir (1906–1987)
- Julia Polak (1939–2014)
- Alberto Carlos Taquini (1905–1998)

=== Azerbaijan ===
- Karim bey Mehmandarov

=== Australia ===
- Bob Brown – parliamentary leader of the Australian Greens
- Andrew Laming – Australian politician
- Peter Macdonald
- Brendan Nelson – Australian politician
- Sir Earle Page – Prime Minister of Australia
- Dinesh Palipana – first quadriplegic medical graduate in Queensland, disability advocate
- Andrew Refshauge – Australian politician
- Mal Washer
- Michael Wooldridge

=== Brazil ===
- Geraldo Alckmin – Vice President of Brazil, Minister of Development, Industry, Trade and Services, former Governor of São Paulo, former Vice Governor of São Paulo, former mayor of Pindamonhangaba and former federal deputy for São Paulo
- Antônio Austregésilo – former federal deputy for Pernambuco
- Enéas Carneiro – former federal deputy for São Paulo and former presidential candidate
- Marcelo Castro – senator for Piauí and former Minister of Health
- Arthur Chioro – former Minister of Health
- Humberto Costa – senator for Pernambuco
- Antônio Salim Curiati – former Mayor of São Paulo
- Pedro Ernesto – former Mayor of Rio de Janeiro
- Jandira Feghali – federal deputy for Rio de Janeiro
- André Fufuca – Minister of Sports and former federal deputy for Maranhão
- Paulo Garcia – former mayor of Goiânia
- Hiran Gonçalves – senator for Roraima and former federal deputy for Roraima
- Ângela Guadagnin – former mayor of São José dos Campos and former federal deputy for São Paulo
- Eduardo Jorge – former federal deputy for São Paulo and former presidential candidate
- Juscelino Kubitschek – former President of Brazil, former Governor of Minas Gerais, former senator for Goiás, former Mayor of Belo Horizonte and former federal deputy for Minas Gerais
- Lavoisier Maia – former Governor of Rio Grande do Norte, former senator for Rio Grande do Norte and former federal deputy for Rio Grande do Norte
- Zenaide Maia – senator for Rio Grande do Norte and former federal deputy for Rio Grande do Norte
- Luiz Henrique Mandetta – former Minister of Health and former federal deputy for Mato Grosso do Sul
- Raquel Muniz – former federal deputy for Minas Gerais
- Carlos Neder – former state deputy of São Paulo
- Alexandre Padilha – federal deputy for São Paulo and former Minister of Health
- Darcísio Perondi – federal deputy for Rio Grande do Sul
- Mario Pinotti – former Minister of Health and former mayor of Nova Iguaçu
- Marcelo Queiroga – former Minister of Health
- Hélio de Oliveira Santos – former mayor of Campinas and former federal deputy for São Paulo
- Alexandre Serfiotis – federal deputy for Rio de Janeiro
- Nelson Teich – former Minister of Health
- José Gomes Temporão – former Minister of Health

=== Canada ===
- Philippe Couillard – former Premier of Quebec
- Thomas "Tommy" Douglas - Premier of Saskatchewan who introduced North America's first universal health care program
- Carolyn Bennett
- Stanley K. Bernstein
- Frederick William Borden – Canadian MP and minister of the Militia
- Bernard-Augustin Conroy
- John Waterhouse Daniel
- Hedy Fry (born 1941) – Canadian politician, member of parliament
- Dennis Furlong
- Charles Godfrey
- Grant Hill – former Canadian MP
- Wilbert Keon – Canadian senator
- Keith Martin – Portuguese Canadian MP
- William McGuigan – mayor of Vancouver, British Columbia
- Théodore Robitaille – Lieutenant Governor of Quebec, Quebec MNA and Senator
- Bette Stephenson – Ontario MPP and former Minister of Labour, Minister of Education and Minister of Colleges and Universities
- Donald Matheson Sutherland – MP and former minister of National Defence
- David Swann
- Sir Charles Tupper (1821–1915) – Prime Minister of Canada (1896) and Premier of Nova Scotia (1864–1867); High Commissioner in Great Britain (1884–1887)

=== France ===
- Louis Auguste Blanqui – French revolutionary socialist
- Georges Clemenceau (1841–1929) – French statesman
- Jean-Paul Marat – French revolution leader

=== Italy ===
- Guido Baccelli (1830–1916) – seven times Minister of education

=== Japan ===
- Tomoko Abe – Representative of Japan
- Ichirō Kamoshita – Representative of Japan, former Environment Minister
- Taro Nakayama – former Representative of Japan, former Foreign Minister
- Chikara Sakaguchi – Representative of Japan, former Minister of Health, Labour and Welfare
- Koichiro Shimizu – former Representative of Japan, one of Koizumi Children
- Tsutomu Tomioka – former Representative of Japan, one of Koizumi Children

=== The Netherlands ===
- Frederik van Eeden
- J. Slauerhoff
- Simon Vestdijk
- Leo Vroman

=== Pakistan ===
- Firdous Ashiq Awan
- Asim Hussain
- Ghulam Hussain

=== United Kingdom ===
- Liam Fox – former British Secretary of State for Defence
- John Pope Hennessy – former Governor of Hong Kong
- David Owen – British politician

=== United States ===
- Stewart Barlow – member of the Utah House of Representatives
- Larry Bucshon (born 1962) – U.S. Congressman from Indiana
- Michael C. Burgess (born 1950) – U.S. Congressman from Texas
- Ben Carson (born September 18, 1951) – United States Secretary of Housing and Urban Development
- Tom Coburn (1948–2020) – U.S. Senator
- Howard Dean (born 1948) – former Governor of Vermont
- Scott Ecklund – member of the South Dakota House of Representatives
- Joe Ellington (born 1959) – member of the West Virginia House of Delegates
- Bill Frist (born 1952) – United States Senate Majority Leader
- Joe Heck (born 1961) – U.S. Congressman
- Steve Henry (born 1953) – Lieutenant Governor of Kentucky
- Jim McDermott – U.S. Congressman
- Larry McDonald – U.S. Congressman
- Ralph Northam (born 1959) – Governor of Virginia
- Christopher Ottiano (born 1969) – member of the Rhode Island Senate
- Rand Paul (born 1963) – U.S. Senator
- Ron Paul (born 1935) – U.S. Congressman
- Tom Price (born 1954) – U.S. Congressman from Georgia and former Secretary of Health and Human Services
- David Watkins – member of the Kentucky House of Representatives
- Dave Weldon – U.S. Congressman and autism activist
- Ray Lyman Wilbur (1875–1949) – United States Secretary of the Interior, president of Stanford University
- Milton R. Wolf
- Thomas Wynne (1627–1691) – physician to William Penn, speaker of the first two Provincial Assemblies in Philadelphia (1687 & 1688)

== Doctors famous as sportspeople ==
- Tenley Albright – Olympic figure skating champion
- Lisa Aukland – American professional bodybuilder and powerlifter
- Sir Roger Bannister (1929–2018) – first man to break the four-minute mile; English neurologist
- Tim Brabants – sprint kayaker, Olympic gold medalist
- Paulo do Rio Branco – French-Brazilian rugby union player
- Felipe Contepomi – Argentine rugby union footballer
- Ted Eisenberg – American 2018 world champion in long distance tomahawk throwing
- Gail Hopkins – American professional baseball player
- David Gerrard – New Zealand swimmer
- Randy Gregg – ice hockey player
- Jack Lovelock (1910–1949) – Olympic athlete
- Richard Mamiya (1925–2019) – football player
- Doc Medich – American baseball player
- Stephen Rerych – American swimmer, Olympic champion, and former world record-holder
- Dot Richardson – American softball player, Olympics; orthopedic physician
- Sócrates (Sócrates Brasileiro Sampaio de Souza Vieira de Oliveira) – Brazilian soccer player, played for the national team 1979–1986

== Doctors famous for their role in television and the media ==
=== Australia ===
- Jeremy Cumpston
- Jonathan LaPaglia
- Peter Larkins
- Renee Lim
- Andrew Rochford
- Rob Sitch

=== Brazil ===
- Thelma Assis
- Fred Nicácio
- Lúcia Petterle
- Robert Rey
- Drauzio Varella

=== Finland ===
- Emilia Vuorisalmi

=== Germany ===
- Marianne Koch
- Gunther Philipp

=== Ireland ===
- Ronan Tynan

=== Malta ===
- Gianluca Bezzina

=== Norway ===
- Anders Danielsen Lie
- Gro Harlem Brundtland (born 1939) – first Norwegian female prime minister; Director-General of the World Health Organization

=== Pakistan ===
- Shaista Lodhi
- Ayesha Gul
- Fahad Mirza

=== South Africa ===
- Phil du Plessis

=== Spain ===
- El Gran Wyoming

=== Sweden ===
- Staffan Hallerstam
- Jesper Salén
- Rebecka Liljeberg

=== United Kingdom ===
- Carina Tyrrell
- Tony Gardner
- Harry Hill
- Christian Jessen
- Sunshine Martyn
- Pixie McKenna
- Sir Jonathan Wolfe Miller
- Darwin Shaw
- Hank Wangford

=== United States ===
- Jennifer Ashton
- Andrew Baldwin
- Jennifer Berman
- Deepak Chopra
- Lyn Christie
- Terry Dubrow
- Garth Fisher
- Leo Galland
- Anthony C. Griffin
- Sanjay Gupta
- Randal Haworth
- Jason Todd Ipson
- Matt Iseman
- Ken Jeong
- Sean Kenniff
- Will Kirby
- C. Everett Koop
- John S. Marr
- Lucky Meisenheimer
- Paul Nassif
- Andrew P. Ordon
- Mehmet Oz
- Nicholas Perricone
- Drew Pinsky
- Bernard Punsly
- Robert Rey
- Brent Ridge
- Nancy Snyderman
- Benjamin Spock
- Travis Stork

== Doctors famous as beauty queens ==
- Mahmure Birsen Sakaoğlu, Miss Turkey 1936
- Eva Andersson-Dubin, Miss Sweden 1980
- Deidre Downs, Miss America 2005
- Anna Malova, Miss Russia 1998
- Lúcia Petterle, Miss World 1971 for Brazil
- Limor Schreibman-Sharir, Miss Israel 1973

== Doctors famous as first ladies ==
- Susan Lynch (pediatrician), First Lady of New Hampshire
- Mildred Scheel, wife of Walter Scheel

== Doctors famous for other activities ==
- Anderson Ruffin Abbott
- Jane Addams – social activist
- Dav and ultrasound technologies to Saint Vincent and the Grenadines
- Oswald Avery (1877–1955) – molecular biologist who discovered DNA carried genetic information
- Ali Bacher – cricketer
- Abd al-Latif al-Baghdadi – traveller
- Roger Bannister – runner, first sub-four-minute miler
- Josiah Bartlett – American statesman and chief justice of New Hampshire
- T. Romeyn Beck (1791–1855) – American forensic medicine pioneer
- Ramon Betances – surgeon, PR nationalist
- Maximilian Bircher-Benner (1867–1939) – nutritionist
- Oscar Biscet – human rights advocate
- Herman Boerhaave – humanist
- Alexander Borodin – composer, chemist
- Thomas Bowdler – censor
- Tom Armstrong Bowes (1869–1954) – physician and antiquarian
- Maria Pilar Bruguera Sábat – nun
- Lafayette Bunnell – explorer of Yosemite Valley
- John Caius (1510–1573) – physician and educator
- Roberto Canessa – survivor of Uruguayan Air Force Flight 571, which crashed in the Andes Mountains in 1972
- Gerolamo Cardano – mathematician
- Alexis Carrell – transplant surgeon, eugenicist, Vichy sympathizer
- Ben Carson – African-American neurosurgeon, politician, former cabinet member
- Anton Chekhov – writer
- Laurel B. Clark (1961–2003) – American astronaut, killed in the Space Shuttle Columbia disaster
- Nicolaus Copernicus (1473–1543) – mathematician and astronomer
- Merv Cross (1941–2023) – rugby league player
- Ivan Edwards – USAF flight surgeon, minister, activist, humanitarian
- Mary Lee Edward (1885–1980) – pioneer and surgeon and a hero during World War I on the front lines in France.
- Ted Eisenberg – Guinness World Record holder for most breast augmentation surgeries performed.
- Steven Eisenberg – known as "The Singing Cancer Doctor."
- Sextus Empiricus (2nd–3rd century C.E.) – philosopher
- Ken Evoy
- Roberto Horcades Figueira – former chairman of the Fluminense Football Club
- Giovanni Fontana – Venetian physician, engineer, and encyclopedist
- Luigi Galvani – physicist
- Pierre Gassendi (1592–1655) – philosopher
- William Gilbert (1544–1603) – physicist
- Carl Goresky – physician and scientist
- W. G. Grace – cricketer
- John Franklin Gray (1804–1881) – American educator, first practitioner of homeopathy in the US
- Nehemiah Grew – botanist
- Samuel Hahnemann – founder of homeopathy
- Blanche Moore Haines (1865–1944) – suffragist
- Armand Hammer – entrepreneur
- Daniel Harris
- Lydia Cromwell Hearne – American civic leader
- Karin M. Hehenberger – diabetes expert
- Hermann von Helmholtz – physicist
- Jan Baptist van Helmont (1577–1655) – physiologist
- Harry Hill – British comedian
- Courtney Howard – Yellowknife-based ER physician and one-time leadership candidate, Green Party of Canada
- Samuel Gridley Howe – abolitionist
- Ebenezer Kingsbury Hunt (1810–1889) – President of the Connecticut State Medical Society; director of the Retreat for the Insane
- Varsha Jain – UK Space doctor/researcher for women's health
- Mae Jemison (born 1956) – astronaut
- David Johnson – American swimmer
- Stuart Kauffman (born 1939) – biologist
- John Keats – poet and author
- John Harvey Kellogg – cereal manufacturer
- Charles Krauthammer (1950–2018) – columnist and political commentator
- Marianne Lindsten-Thomasson (1909–1979) – Sweden's first female district medical officer during the 1940s
- Cesare Lombroso (1835–1909) – based his system of criminology on physiognomy
- John McAndrew (1927–2013) – All-Ireland Gaelic footballer
- June McCarroll – inventor of lane markings
- Pat McGeer – Canadian basketball player
- Julia Lore McGrew – medical missionary
- James McHenry (1753–1816) – signer of the United States Constitution
- Archibald Menzies – naturalist
- Franz Mesmer (1734–1815) – proponent of mesmerism and the idea of animal magnetism
- Jonathan Miller (1934–2019) – television presenter and stage director
- Paul Möhring (1710–1792) – zoologist, botanist
- Maria Montessori – educator
- Boris V. Morukov – cosmonaut
- Lee "Final Table" Nelson – professional poker player
- Haing S. Ngor – Oscar-winning film actor
- Heinrich Wilhelm Matthäus Olbers (1758–1840) – astronomer
- Dinesh Palipana – physician with disability and advocate
- Roza Papo – army general
- James Parkinson – physician, geologist, political activist
- Claude Perrault – architect
- Christian Hendrik Persoon – South African botanist
- Pope John XXI – pope
- Scott Powell – co-founder of the nostalgia group Sha Na Na
- Weston A. Price – traveler, educator
- Nabeel Qureshi – Christian apologist and author
- Syed Ziaur Rahman – physician and medical scientist
- John Ray – plant taxonomer
- Prathap C. Reddy
- Bradbury Robinson – threw the first legal forward pass in American football history while a medical student at St. Louis University
- Peter Mark Roget – English lexicographer
- Jacques Rogge – sports official
- Mowaffak al-Rubaie – human rights advocate, member of the Interim Iraqi Governing Council
- Benjamin Rush – signer of the United States Constitution
- Daniel Rutherford (1749–1819) – chemist
- Bendapudi Venkata Satyanarayana
- Félix Savart – physicist
- Guido Schäffer (1974–2009) – Brazilian venerable
- Albert Schweitzer – humanist
- Michael Servetus (1511–1553) – burnt at the stake by Calvinists for heresy
- Paul Sinha – British comedian
- Rob Sitch – Australian comedian
- Sócrates (1954–2011, Sócrates Brasileiro Sampaio de Souza Vieira de Oliveira) – Brazilian football (soccer) player
- James Hudson Taylor (1832–1905) – British missionary to China and founder of the China Inland Mission
- Norman Earl Thagard – astronaut
- Debi Thomas (born 1967) – Olympic figure skater
- William E. Thornton – astronaut
- John Tidwell – American basketball player
- Nasiruddin al-Tusi – astronomer
- Laura Veale – first qualified woman doctor practising in Harrogate and North Riding of Yorkshire
- Andrew Wakefield – conducted studies on disputed link between vaccines and neurodevelopmental disorders, which had many serious consequences
- William Walker – Latin American adventurer
- Moshe Wallach (1866–1957) – founder and director of Shaare Zedek Hospital, Jerusalem, for 45 years
- John Clarence Webster – Canadian historian
- Wilhelm Weinberg – with G. H. Hardy, developed the Hardy–Weinberg equilibrium model of population genetics
- J. P. R. Williams – rugby union player
- Hugh Williamson – American patriot, statesman, Surgeon General of SC
- Thomas Young – scientist

== See also ==
- List of fictional doctors
- List of psychiatrists
- List of neurologists and neurosurgeons
- List of people in healthcare
- List of presidents of the Royal College of Physicians
- List of Iraqi medical doctors
- List of Russian physicians and psychologists
- List of Slovenian medical doctors
- List of Turkish medical doctors
- List of Uruguayan medical doctors
