= Anna Irene Von Sholly =

American doctor and suffragist (1877–1964)

Anna Irene Von Sholly (October 23, 1877 – September 18, 1964) was an American physician and suffragist from New York City who volunteered with the Women's Oversea Hospitals in France during World War I. The French government honored Von Sholly with the Croix de Guerre in 1918 for her valiant service caring for wounded soldiers while under fire at Château Ognon.

== Family and education ==
Von Sholly was born in Flushing, Queens, New York, on October 23, 1877, to Gustavus Adolph Von Sholly and Sarah Jacobs. She graduated from Barnard College in 1898 and Cornell University Medical School in 1902. She and Nan Gilbert Seymour were among the honor roll graduates in their medical school class.

== Career ==
Von Sholly enjoyed a long and successful career as a doctor in New York City. An active suffrage leader, Von Sholly advocated for the health and welfare of women and children. She was director of pediatric medicine at the New York Infirmary for Women and Children, served on the New York City Board of Health, was a consultant at Bellevue Hospital, and fellow of the New York Academy of Medicine.

During World War I, Von Sholly helped organize the Women's Overseas Hospital (WOH), an all-woman volunteer medical unit sponsored by the National American Women's Suffrage Association. Beginning in 1917, Von Sholly began working with Drs. Caroline S. Finley, Mary Lee Edward, and Alice Gregory on fundraising and logistical planning for the first WOH unit to travel to Europe in support of the war effort. The WOH was invited to work under the French military's medical corps, the Service de Sante. Von Sholly traveled to France in February 1918 under the leadership of Dr. Caroline Finley.

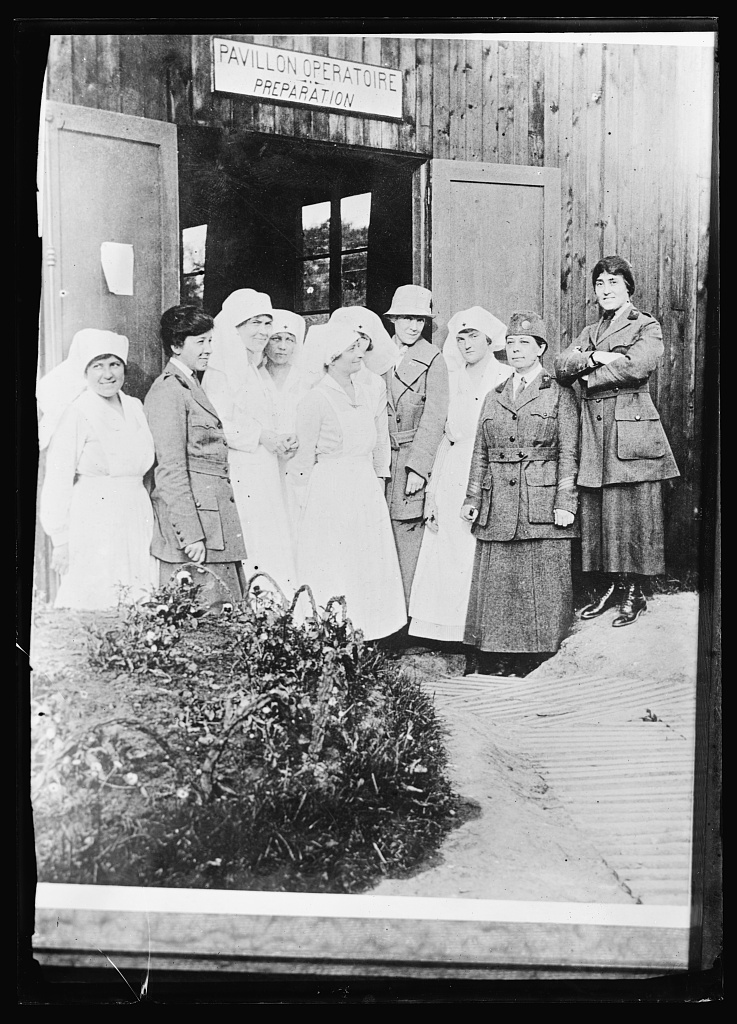
Staff of Military Unit of Women's Oversea Hospitals U.S.A. in France. Dr. Anna Von Sholly is pictured on the right with folded arms, looking at the photographer.

Von Sholly was part of the company of twelve medical women who went to work in an evacuation hospital established at Château Ognon, outside of Paris. This region became part of the frontline in the German offensive in the early summer of 1918. Von Sholly and her colleagues worked through intense artillery fire as they performed surgeries and cared for patients between May 27 and June 16. On September 3, 1918, the French government formally recognized the valor of the American women doctors, awarding the Croix de Guerre to Dr. Von Sholly, along with her colleagues Drs. Finley, Edwards, and nurse Jane McKee for their service at Château Ognon. Von Sholly was also promoted to First Lieutenant in the French army.

Von Sholly was an active alumnus of Barnard College and served a term as a vice president of their alumni association.

== Death ==
Dr. Von Sholly died the age of 86 on September 18, 1964, at the New York Infirmary for Women and Children.
