= Schurig =

Schurig is a surname. Notable people with the surname include:

- Craig Schurig (born 1965), American football coach and former player
- Martin Schurig (1656–1733), German physician
- Roger Schurig (born 1942), American basketball player
- Stefan Schurig (born 1971), German architect
