= Anthony Griffin =

Anthony or Tony Griffin may refer to:

- Anthony J. Griffin (1866–1935), U.S. representative from New York
- Anthony C. Griffin, American plastic surgeon
- Anthony Griffin (Royal Navy officer) (1920–1996), Controller of the Royal Navy
- Anthony Griffin (rugby league) (born 1966), Australian rugby league football coach
- Anthony Griffin (footballer) (born 1979), retired English footballer
- Anthony Griffin (c. 1968–1987), Black Canadian shot by the police, see killing of Anthony Griffin
- Tony Griffin (hurler) (born 1981), Irish hurler
- Tony Griffin (athlete), British Paralympic athlete
