= Onik =

Onik can be both a masculine given name and a surname. Notable people with the name include:

- Onik Gasparyan, Armenian colonel-general
- Gary Onik, medical doctor
- Qazi Onik (born 1999), Bangladeshi cricketer
