= Carlo Forlanini =

Italian physician (1847–1918)

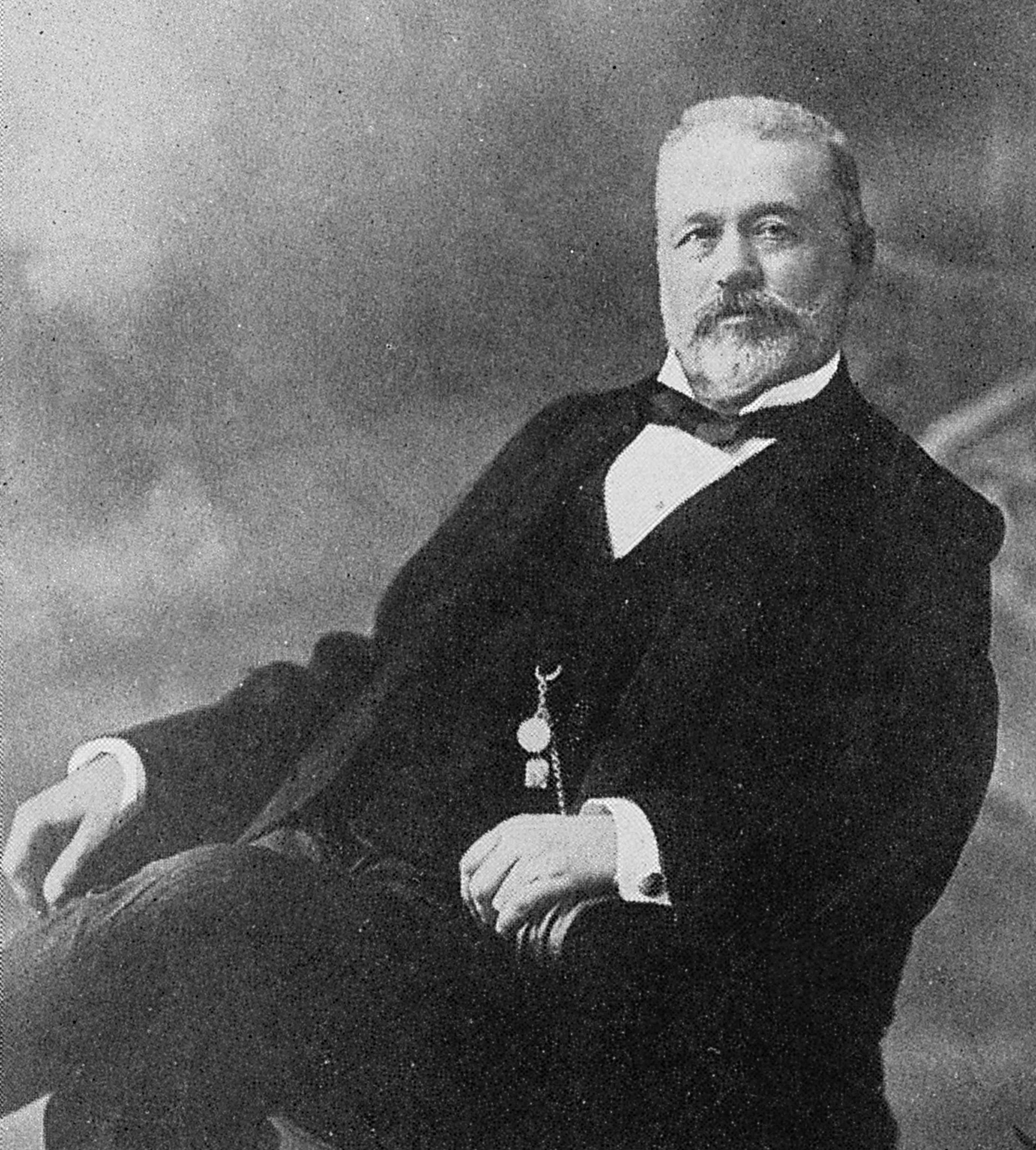
- photograph portrait of Forlanini, year unknown
- Born: 11 June 1847; Milan, Austrian Empire
- Died: 25 May 1918 (aged 70); Nervi, Italy
- Scientific career
- Education: University of Pavia
- Known for: Invention of artificial pneumothorax as a treatment for tuberculosis
- Fields: Physiology, Medicine

Senator of the Italian Kingdom (legislature XXIV)
- In office 1913–1918

Signature
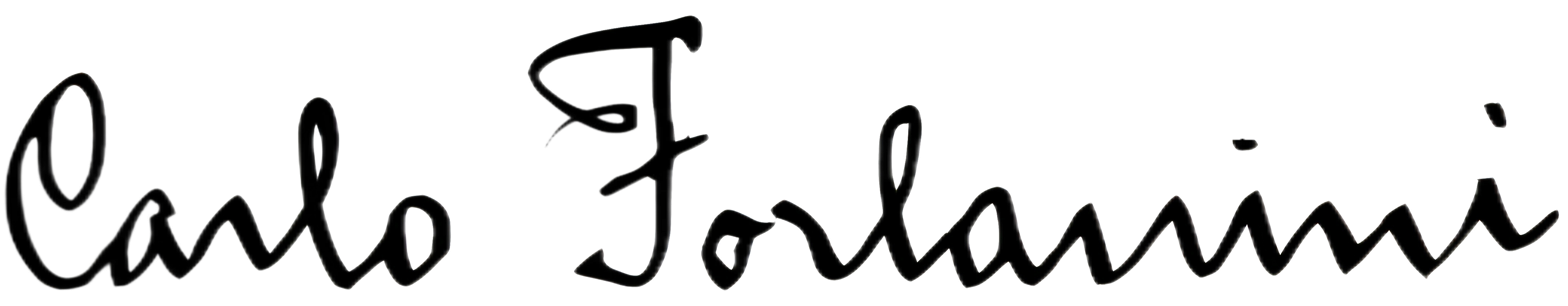

Carlo Forlanini (11 June 1847 – 25 May 1918) was a medical doctor and professor at the Universities of Turin and Pavia. He was also the inventor of artificial pneumothorax, which was the primary treatment method of pulmonary tuberculosis for the first half of the 20th century and remained in use for severe cases of tuberculosis into the 1970s.

== Early life ==
Carlo Forlanini was born in Milan on 11 June 1847, the eldest of four brothers and one sister. His father, Giuseppe Forlanini, was a physician belonging to a bourgeosie family of Milan. His mother, Marianna Rossi, died of pulmonary phthisis. Forlanini attended secondary school in Como, received his pre-doctoral education at Calchi Taeggi in Milan, then attended the Borromeo College at the University of Pavia. He interrupted his medical studies in 1866 to serve under Garibaldi as part of Garibaldi's unification of Italy. Forlanini participated in the Battle of Monte Suello and the Bezzecca. After his return to Pavia he published his first scientific work in 1868 and became friends with Giulio Bizzozero and Camillo Golgi while studying under Paolo Mantegazza at the Mantegazza institute and ophthalmologist Antonio Quaglino.

== Career at Maggiore & initial experiments ==
On 9 August 1870 he graduated from the University of Padua. Despite his tutelage under an ophthalmologist and his dissertation (reworked and published the following year) furthering research in ophthalmology, Forlanini elected to end his pursuit of that specialty and instead returned home to Milan, where he secured a position at the Maggiore hospital in 1871.

At the Maggiore hospital, Forlanini worked in the departments of chronic diseases and eye diseases, then became the head of the skin department in 1881. While in these roles, Forlanini treated and observed a number of patients with tuberculosis, as the disease was a major health crisis in his lifetime. Aided by one of his brothers, Enrico, he designed and experimented with a number of devices and methods for treating tuberculosis. These included attempts to treat tuberculosis and similar diseases of the lungs with forced respiratory movement to increase blood flow to the lungs and improve the patient's air supply, though he found these methods unfruitful. However, something beneficial did emerge from these experiments and from his collaboration with Enrico; some of the world's first hyperbaric chambers. In 1875—to further research and treatment of tuberculosis—Forlanini founded both the Pneumotherapy Society and the Pneumatic Institute of Milan.

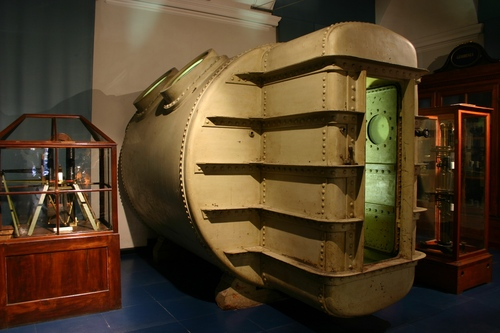
Carlo Forlanini's hyperbaric chamber in the "Museo per la Storia dell'Università di Pavia", Pavia

In the course of his work with tuberculosis patients, Forlanini observed a number of them experience spontaneous pneumothorax. These ruptures frequently led to the patients' deaths. Pus and air would flood the pleural cavity, which put pressure on the already struggling lungs in addition to exposing them to further infection. Forlanini, as a handful of previous physicians had, theorized that if pressure could be artificially applied to the lungs with air and without septic fluid, the lung could be allowed to rest, heal, and scar, thus eliminating the cavities formed and inhabited by tuberculosis in the affected lung.

In 1882, he published an article describing this theory regarding artificial pneumothorax. At this time, neither Forlanini nor those who had independently formed the same theory had completed an extensive study of the use of APT in treating tuberculosis, and the contemporary medical community favored studies into bacteria and vaccines, so little interest was shown in the article.

== University Career - Turin and Pavia ==
In 1884 Forlanini began his university career at the University of Turin as a tenured professor of special medical pathology, obtained the position of "extraordinarius" professor at the university's preparatory medical clinic, and the following year he became the Director of the Cabinet of Special Preparatory and Medical Pathology. During this time, he mentored the future inventor of the pneumatic cuff sphygmomanometer, Scipione Riva-Rocci.

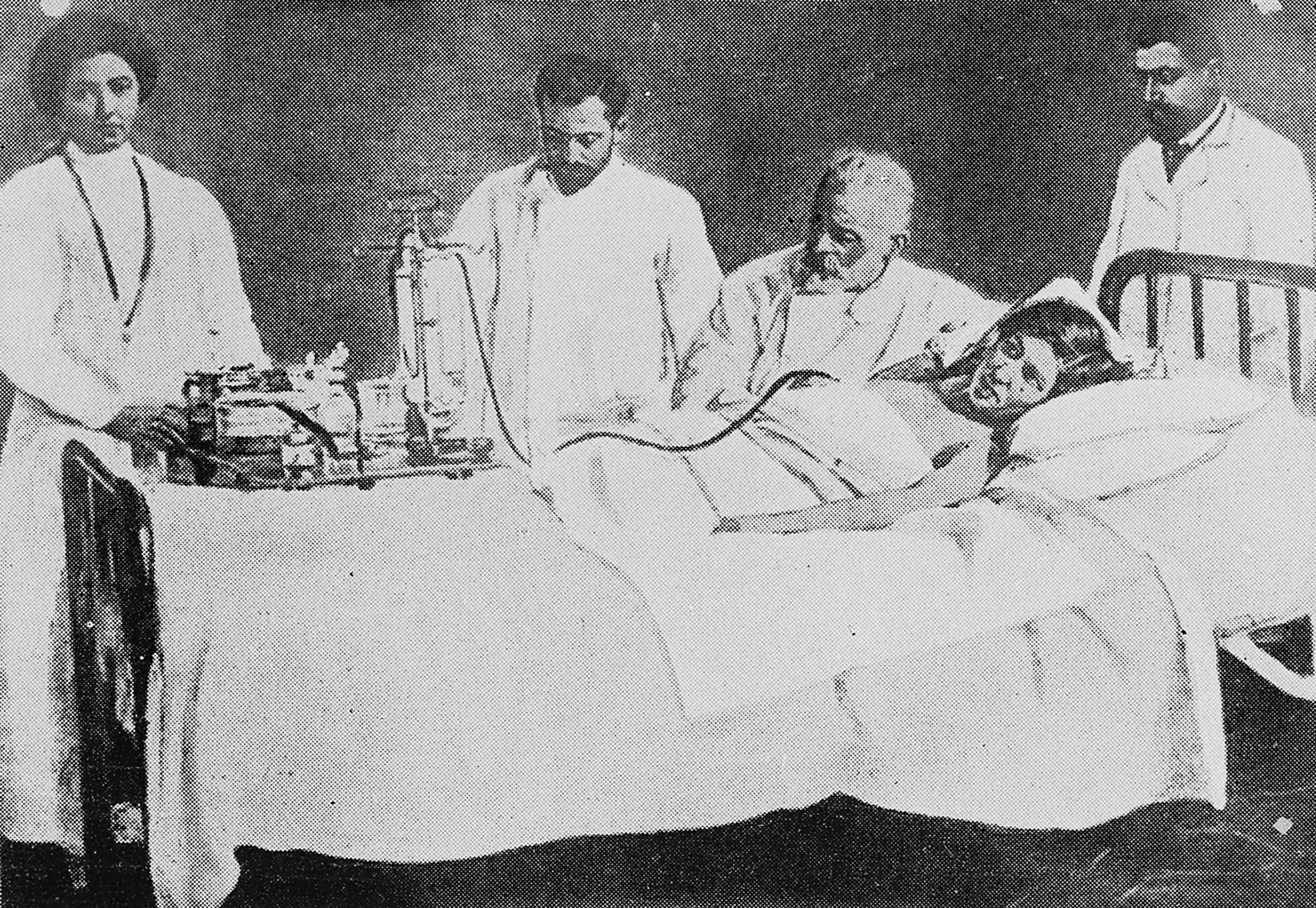
Forlanini administering artificial pneumothorax

The University of Pavia offered Forlanini a provisional teaching position instructing in special medical pathology in 1898, for which he returned to the city. He would ultimately decide to remain when, in 1900, he was offered a permanent professoral position at his alma mater. A handful of his students—Scipione Riva-Rocci, Umberto Carpi De Resmini, and Eugenio Morelli—followed Forlanini in this move. Forlanini's theory of artificial pneumothorax (for the treatment of tuberculosis) was first presented at the eleventh International Medical Congress in Rome and, the following year, also presented his results at the Italian Congress of Internal Medicine. In following years, his technique was criticized for the procedure's severe complications, which at times included emphysema and cerebral embolism as noted by Forlanini himself. Earlier that year (1894), he had performed the procedure for the first time.

== Recognitions of his work ==
Year by year Forlanini improved and promoted his method and, in April 1912, he held a famous lecture in Rome titled "Artificial pneumothorax in the treatment of pulmonary phthisis" at the seventh International Congress on Tuberculosis. The presentation was warmly received and, after thirty years of studies on pneumothorax, he obtained full international recognition of his work. Forlanini had an attractive personality, was a great conversationalist, and was cultured in music and art. He was very much the beloved physician to his hospital patients and was content to pursue his researches without desire for personal aggrandisement. In 1913 he was nominated senator of the Kingdom of Italy and member of the council of public education. His lifelong friend and fellow professor at the University of Pavia, Camillo Golgi, nominated him three times for the Nobel Prize in Medicine, remarking that the invention of pneumothorax was "of great benefit to humanity". However, the three years Golgi nominated Forlanini for the Prize (1915-1918) they were not being awarded at all. During this time, Forlanini's health rapidly declined; he experienced severe migraines and an abdominal malignancy, possibly a carcinoma of the pancreas. Of this he died in Nervi, on the Ligurian Riviera, at age 71 on 25 May 1918. Today the "Carlo Forlanini Institute" in Rome, founded in 1934, is named in his honour.

== Artificial Pneumothorax ==
=== Early stages and inspiration ===
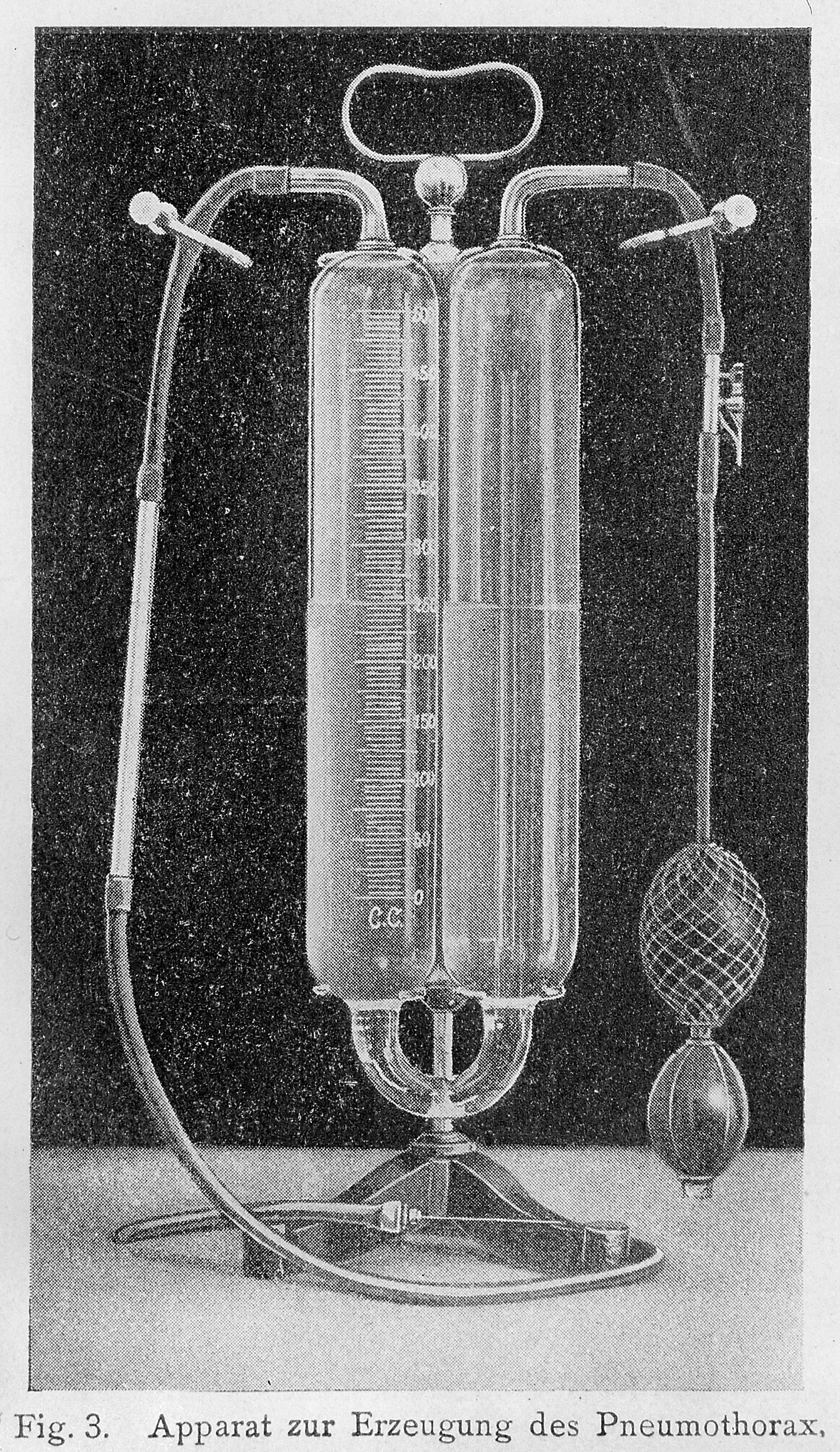
Pneumo device - a picture of Forlanini's apparatus for the artificial pneumothorax

From the early stages of his career, Forlanini's interest in tuberculosis has been a recurring factor in his professional and academic life, leading him to the invention of the artificial pneumothorax. The idea that an intentionally induced pneumothorax might have been useful in treating tuberculosis was first proposed in 1771 by French librarian Edmong Claud Bourru, who at the time was working on a French translation of Gilchrist's work The Use of Sea Voyages in Medicine, Particularly in a Consumption and Observations on that Disease. It was, however, only fifty years later (in 1822) that British physician James Carson started conducting experiments on rabbits to study the impact and potential applications of the pneumothorax on rabbit activities. Despite the risk of complete collapse of the diseased lung, Carson thought the attempt at producing an artificial pneumothorax in humans was justified due to the disease's death rate and how widespread it was. However, after a failed attempt at reproducing the experiment in a human subject the idea of collapse therapy was abandoned and it would only resurface several years later. When Forlanini first started exploring the idea of using an artificial pneumothorax as a treatment for tuberculosis, he wasn't aware of Carson's experiments (his work remained unnoticed until 1909). His interest in the study of pulmonary diseases developed while he was working as a newly graduated medical student in the chronically ill division of the Ospedale Maggiore in Milan. During this years, he started to conceive devices with the objective to increase lung ventilation in people with tuberculosis. In his effort to build said device, he was aided by his brother Enrico Forlanini (a skilled engineer and one of the pioneers of air flight).

=== Development ===
With the assistance of his brother, Carlo Forlanini designed and constructed a simple device capable of administering gases intrapleurally. The presence of gas in the intrapleural fluid caused the lung to collapse, therefore creating an artificial pneumothorax. After having built the device, Forlanini tried treating two cases of tuberculosis by inducing a pneumothorax in the two patients and obtained positive results.

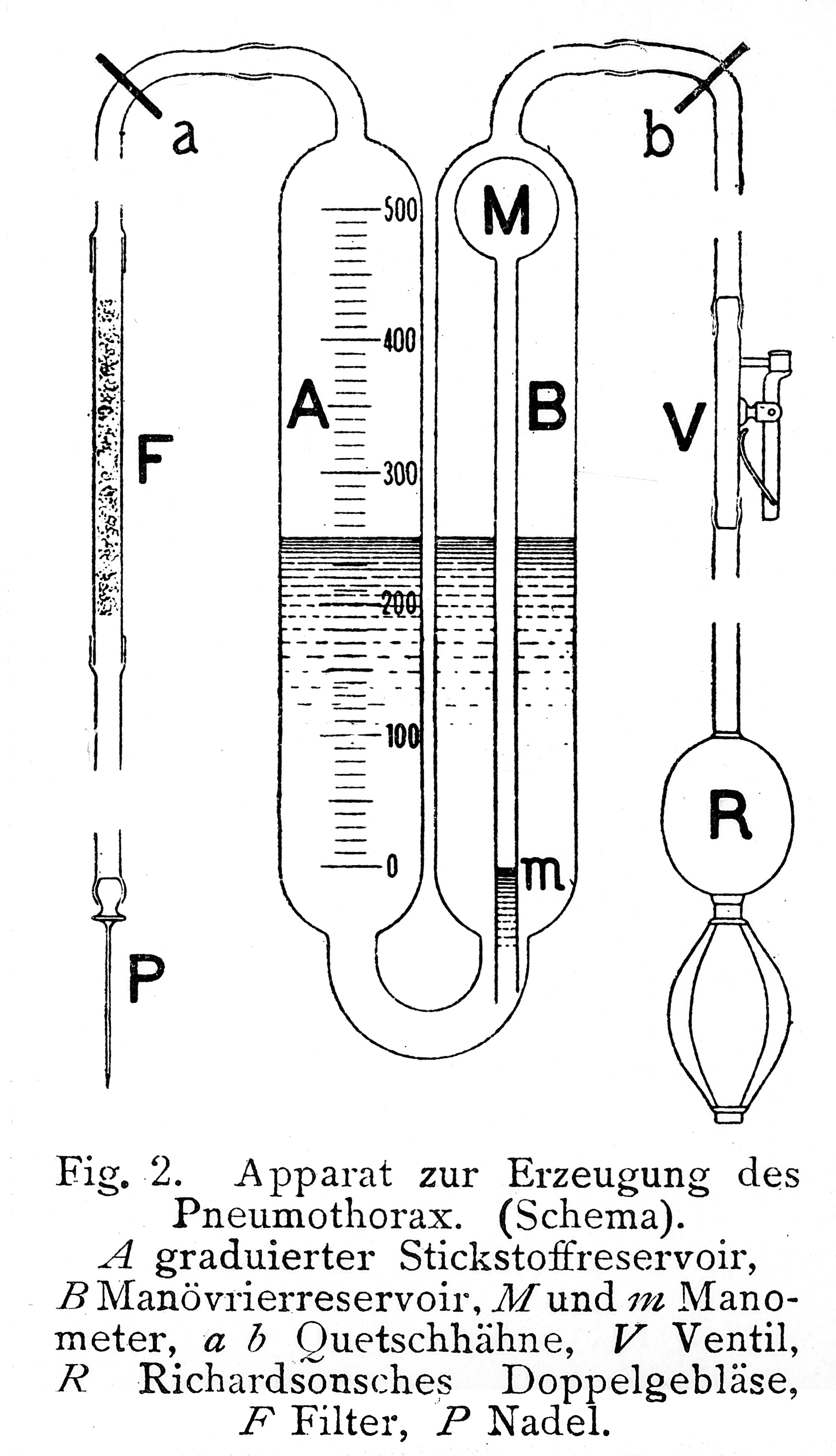
Pneumo device - a diagram of the most essential parts of the device

The device used in the treatment, later referred to as "pneumo device", consisted of a hollow needle, a hydraulic pump and a pressure gauge, as well as two nitrogen reservoirs. During his experiments, Forlanini noticed that the pleura bears the presence of air quite well, however oxygen was absorbed more quickly than other gases. This prompted him to use nitrogen, which had to be administered everyday in small quantities (if the gas was absorbed too quickly, the dose had to be increased). As the absorptive capacity of the pleura lessens over time, the interval between the injections could be lengthened after a few months.

=== Findings and publications ===
In the year following his experiments (1895) Forlanini reported the successful outcome of his artificial pneumothorax in the journal "Gazzetta Medica di Torino". However, the full report on his experiments and the extent of his research only came in 1906 (report based on 25 cases). After 1895, Forlanini's findings were mostly met with indifference in the Italian medical community (in some cases Italian physicians proved to be hostile towards the new technique). Despite this, Forlanini persevered in his research and perfected the artificial pneumothorax, granting him an even deeper understanding of the procedure itself. This allowed him to present an authoritative report on his artificial pneumothorax during the Seventh International Congress on Tuberculosis in Rome (in 1912), for which he received great praise. After 1912 Forlanini's technique for artificial pneumothorax started spreading all over Europe and the United States, prompting many other physicians to adopt this technique. Over the years, Forlanini's technique was further developed and improved, therefore increasing the success rate of the procedure. Artificial pneumothorax continued as a treatment until the introduction of streptomycin in 1944.Daniel, T. M. (1 November 2006). "The history of tuberculosis". Respiratory Medicine. 100 (11): 1862–1870. doi:10.1016/j.rmed.2006.08.006. ISSN 0954-6111. PMID 16949809.

== Nobel Prize ==
From 1912 to 1919, Forlanini was nominated at least 20 times for the Nobel Prize; all of his nominators were Italian professors of medicine. They put forward several explanations, trying to convince the prize jury of why Forlanini should be seen as "the person who shall have made the most important discovery within the domain of physiology or medicine". Three of the nominations for Forlanini were submitted by his close friend Camillo Golgi (1843 to 1926) from Pavia, who, as a former Nobel Laureate (1906) had the right to propose a candidate each year (NA, yearbooks of 1912, 1917, 1919), he nominated Forlanini because he was convinced that the invention of pneumothorax was a turning point in the fight against tuberculosis. Because at least some members of the Nobel committee saw great potential in pneumothorax treatment, Forlanini was viewed as one of the prime Nobel Prize candidates during 1913 and 1914. However, despite all the nominations and efforts, he never received the Prize. The prize Jury voted in favour of other candidates because they deemed the PNX method as neither original nor brilliant enough to award him a Nobel Prize (the operation's high risks for the patiens posed as an important factor in the decision).

== Carlo Forlanini Institute ==
Foralnini died 25 May 1918 in Nervi, Italy, from what was described as "abdominal malignancy", likely pancreatic carcinoma. Following his passing, his many pupils and admirers, both Italian and foreign, wished to create a suitable living memorial to their master. A research fund for the study of tuberculosis was founded in his name shortly after his death. Chiefly through the inspiration of his favorite pupil, Eugenio Morelli (1881-1968), the Carlo Forlanini Institute in Rome was founded in 1934. Morelli was the first director (1934-1945) and he was succeeded by his pupil Attilio Omedei- Zonini (1945–68), who was followed by a series of distinguished Italian physiologists.

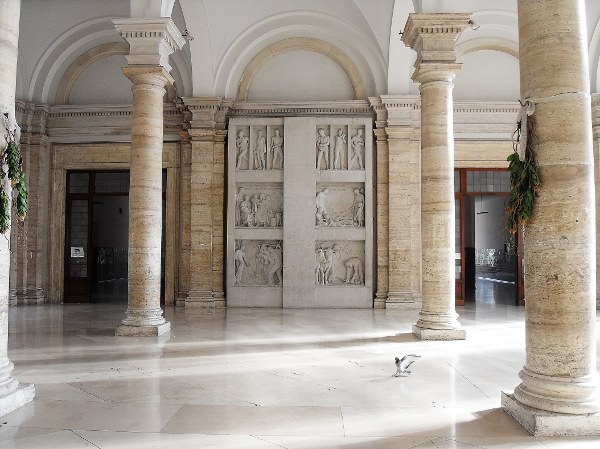
Carlo Forlanini Institute, Rome, Italy

The hospital was used as a sanatorium, specifically opened for all those who had tuberculosis. The building is located in the middle of a 28-hectare (69-acre) park because, before the discovery of anti-TB drugs with bactericidal and bacteriostatic activity, TB was treated with bed rest in a hygienic and well ventilated place. In order to contain the costs of health care, the company hospital S. Camillo-Forlanini decided to close the hospital Forlanini within December 31, 2008 and to transfer its assets and services to the S. Camillo. In 2015 the hospital was closed definitely, its pneumatology departments were merged with the San Camillo ones, while its thoracic surgery wards were included in the Spallanzani hospital. Nowadays "Carlo Forlanini Hospital" is located in Piazza Carlo Forlanini 1 and it is part of the hospital organization San Camillo-Forlanini-Spallanzani.

== Selected works ==
- 1875 Brevissimi cenni di aeroterapia e sullo Stabilimento Medico-pneumatica di Milano. Gazzetta Medica Italiana Lombardia. Serie VII: 6
- 1881 L'aeroterapia, Milano : Stab. Tip. Della Casa Edit. Dott. Francesco Vallardi – Aerotherapy.
- 1882 A contribuzione della terapia chirurgica nella tisi del polmone. Ablazione del polmone? Pneumotorace artificiale? Gazzetta degli Ospedale e della Cliniche di Milano
- 1883 La tecnica delle inalazioni medicamentose, Milano, Vallardi – The technique of medicinal inhalation.
- 1889 Nuovi apparati pneumatici trasportabili, Milano : Dott. Leonardo Vallardi Edit. – A new transportable pneumatic apparatus.
- 1889 Storia di un caso di tisi polmonare curato colle iniezioni parenchimatose, Milano : L. Vallardi – History of a case of pulmonary tuberculosis cured via parenchymatous injections.
- 1894 Primi tentativi di pneumotorace artificiale della tisi pulmonare. Gazzetta Medica di Torino. 45:381-4, 401-3
- 1894 Su un caso di stenosi dell'arteria polmonare con persistenza del dotto di Botallo e di tisi polmonare
- 1895 Primo caso di tisi pulmonare monolaterale avanzata curato felicemente col pneumotorace artificiale. Gazzetta Medica di Torino 46:857
- 1897 Contributo allo studio del polso venoso presistolico
- 1897 Contributo alla terapia dell'empiema
- 1906 Zur Behandlung der Lungenschwindsucht durch künstlich erzeugten Pneumothorax. Deutsche Medizinishe Wochenschrift 32:1401-5
- 1907 La cura della tisi polmonare col pneumotorace prodotto artificialmente, Pavia : Successori Marelli – The cure of pulmonary tuberculosis using artificial pneumothorax.
- 1908 Apparati e tecnica operativa dello pneumotorace artificiale
- 1909 Cenni storici e critici sul pneumotorace artificiale nella tisi pulmonare. In: Cappelli, ed. Scritti di Forlanini. Bologna, 1928:1013
- 1912 Il pneumotorace artificiale nella cura della tisi pulmonare. Atti de VII Congresso Internazionale Contra la Tubercolosi. Vol 3 Rome, 182.

== Bibliography ==
- Alberi, E., Ritratti del regno d'Inghilterra del tempo della Regina Maria. Relazioni degli Ambasciatori Veneti al Senato, Cambridge: Cambridge University Press, pp 381–398. Retrieved 1 May 2022
- Alagna, R., Canetti, D., Castellotti, P., Cirillo, D., Ferragnese, M., Riccardi, N., Villa, S., From the past, a long way to future challenges for a greater control of tuberculosis. Tuberculosis. 123: 101948. July 2020
- Armocida E, Martini M., Tuberculosis: a Timeless Challenge for Medicine, Journal of preventive medicine and Hygiene, 2020
- A.L.B., Carlo Forlanini- 1847 -1918 In commemoration of the 100th anniversary of his birth. Diseases of the Chest. 14 (1): 138–141. January 1948
- Baka, S., Karavasilis, V., Karavergou, A., Kioumis, I., Lampaki, S., Lazaridis, G.; Mpoukovinas, I., Papagiannis, A., Papaiwannou, A., Pitsiou, G., Zarogoulidis, K.. Pneumothorax: an up to date "introduction". Annals of Translational Medicine. 3 (4): 9-9. March 2015
- Balboni, G.M., Forlanini's Artificial Pneumothorax; A Study. The Boston Medical and Surgical Journal. 171 (19): 697–708. 5 November 1914
- Cani, V.; Gabarino, M. C.; Mazzarello, P. : Carlo Forlanini and the first successful treatment of tuberculosis. Lancet. 392 (10146): 475. 11 August 2018
- Coggi, A., Gianotti, R., Pesapane, F., "Carlo Forlanini, the Dermatologist Who Invented the Cure for Pulmonary Tuberculosis". JAMA Dermatology. 150 (9): 969. 2014
- Dalla Pozza, M., Ferreira Neto, J., Marangon, S., Martini, M., A case- control study on bovine tuberculosis in the Veneto region (Italy). Preventive Veterinary Medicine. 34 (2-3): 87–95. February 1998
- Daniel, T. M., The history of tuberculosis. Respiratory Medicine. 100 (11): 1862–1870. 1 November 2006
- Dubovsky H. Artificial pneumothorax in the treatment of lung tuberculosis. S Afr Med J. 1992 Apr 4;81(7):372-5. PMID 1561564.
- Frith J., History of Tuberculosis. Part 2 - the Sanatoria and the Discoveries of the Tubercle Bacillus, Journal of Military and Veterans' Health, 2014
- Hansson, N.; Polianski, I.J. Therapeutic pneumothorax and the Nobel Prize. The Annals of Thoracic Surgery. 100 (2): 761–765. 2015
- Lojacono S., Forlanini's original communication on artificial pneumothorax, Tubercle. 16: 54–60. 1934
- Martini M., Besozzi G, Barberis I, The never-ending story of the fight against tuberculosis: from Koch's bacillus to global control programs, Journal of preventive medicine and Hygiene, 2018
- Martini M., Gazzaniga V., Behzadifar M., Bragazzi N.L., Barberis I., The history of tuberculosis: the social role of sanatoria for the treatment of tuberculosis in Italy between the end of the 19th century and the middle of the 20th, Journal of preventive medicine and Hygiene, 2018
- Mazzarello, P., A Physical Cure for Tuberculosis: Carlo Forlanini and the Invention of Therapeutic Pneumothorax, Applied Sciences, 2020
- Sakula, A. Carlo Forlanini, inventor of artificial pneumothorax for treatment of pulmonary tuberculosis. Thorax. 38 (5): 326–332. 1 May 1983
- Soltys, M. A., Tuberculosis Bacillus and laboratory methods in tuberculosis. Tubercle. 33 (6): 189. August 1952
- Venanzetti M., The story of San Camillo-Forlanini Hospital. Salute e società (2):35-41. June 2014
