= List of people in healthcare =

Famous people in healthcare are famous for many different reasons. For physicians see: List of physicians.

== Nurses ==
=== England ===
- Florence Nightingale OM, RRC — Celebrated English nurse, writer and statistician.

=== United States ===
- Mary Martha Reid — Florida's "most famous nurse and Confederate heroine."

== Respiratory therapists ==
=== Canada ===
- Susan O'Connor — Canadian curler from Alberta.

=== United States ===
- Tom Araya — Respiratory therapist famous through his band Slayer.
- Efren Saldivar — Murdered 60+ people while working in Brownsville, Texas as a respiratory therapist.
- Ronald G. Beckett — Famous for advancing science in Mummy Science.
- Mary Ann Vecchio — Subject of a Pulitzer Prize-winning photograph by photojournalism student John Filo in the aftermath of the Kent State shootings on May 4, 1970.

== See also ==
- List of health insurance chief executive officers in the United States
