= List of Uruguayan medical doctors =

This list of Uruguayan medical doctors includes notable physicians and surgeons, medical scientists and medical doctors from Uruguay or its territory and of Uruguayan descent. Physicians of all specialities may be listed here.

B

- Jorge Basso
- José Bayardi
- Eduardo Blanco Acevedo

C

- Roberto Caldeyro-Barcia
- Ángel Canaveris
- Roberto Canessa
- Santiago Chalar

D

- José L. Duomarco

F

- Orestes Fiandra

G

- Javier García Duchini

L

- Luis Morquio
- Arturo Lussich

M

- Isidro Más de Ayala
- Louis Antony Micheloni
- Susana Muñiz
- María Julia Muñoz

N

- Alfredo Navarro

O

- Emilio Oribe

P

- Carlos Pita (politician)

R

- Elías Regules
- Vladimir Roslik

T

- Rodolfo Tálice

V

- Tabaré Vázquez
- Hugo Villar

X

- Mónica Xavier

Z

- Walter Zimmer
