= Zhang Xichun =

Chinese physician and medical scholar

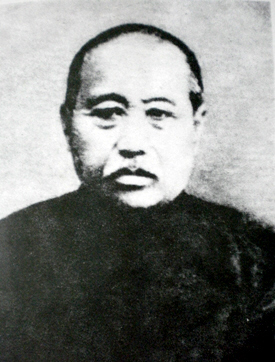
- Born: 1860; Yanshan County, Hebei, China
- Died: 1933 (aged 72–73); Tianjin, China
- Occupations: Physician and writer

Chinese name
- Chinese: 张锡纯
Transcriptions
Standard Mandarin
- Hanyu Pinyin: Zhāng Xīchún

Zhang Xichun (simplified Chinese: 张锡纯; traditional Chinese: 張錫純; pinyin: Zhāng Xīchún; 1860–1933), courtesy name Shoufu (寿甫; 壽甫; Shòufǔ), was a Chinese physician and medical scholar who pioneered the integration of Western and Eastern medicines. The founder of a medical college in Tianjin, Zhang penned many articles on various medical topics. After his death in 1933, a thirty-volume compilation of his papers was released.

== Biography ==
=== Early life and career ===
Zhang Xichun was born in 1860, in Yanshan County, Hebei, China. Zhang was not linguistically inclined, unlike his father, and failed his imperial examinations in Chinese literature twice. Thereafter he switched his sights to medicine; a topic his father had introduced him to, together with Chinese philosophy, spending more than a decade studying it on his own. In 1911, before the end of the Qing dynasty, he joined the military as a doctor and was lauded for his work. Zhang became Dean of the Li Da Chinese Medicine Hospital in 1918. From that point he became known for his incorporation of Western medicine into traditional Chinese medicine, and was successful in remedying illnesses not curable by Western drugs alone. He also began publishing a series of essays on a wide range of medical issues titled, The Assimilation of Western Medicine to Chinese in Medicine.

In 1926, he established the Tianjin Institute for Integrated Chinese and Western Medicine, which attracted "hundreds of students from across the country". About two years afterwards, he formulated a treatment for febrile arthritis combining aspirin with a traditional Chinese medicine, gypsum fibrosum. His cure for "obstinate vomiting", predominantly made of rhizoma pinelliae, was said to have "achieved very good results".

=== Death ===
Zhang Xichun died of illness in 1933 at age 74. A collection of Zhang's medical papers, comprising some thirty volumes and titled, Medical Essays Esteeming the East and Respecting the West, was edited by Zhang's son and released in 1934. After 1949, rights to the compilation, alongside a few other of Zhang's essays, were transferred to the Hebei Hygiene Association. Zhang's publications are now regarded as "an important modern classic of Chinese medicine".

=== Views ===
Zhang saw philosophy as complementary and beneficial to medicine, contrary to the belief held by many of his time that the former inhibits the latter's development. As he articulates in his essay Concerning The Relation of Philosophy and Medicine:

Many recent medical journal reports take the view that [traditional Chinese] philosophy holds back the progress of medicine, but their authors do not understand the use of philosophy, nor do they understand that philosophy is actually the basis of medicine [...] philosophy is the true source of medicine, or rather that medicine is the natural outcome of philosophy.

He also believed that modern and traditional medicine shared a common set of principles and thought that Western medical knowledge could be proof for ancient Chinese beliefs, such as in the case of determining that the heart cannot function without the brain. However, he was unhappy with the situation of his time that was Western teachings being seen as superior to Chinese ones. Wanting to end this "uncritical replacement", Zhang supported the Boxer Rebellion in 1900.

=== Legacy ===
Zhang is considered as one of the "four masters of medicine" of China, the other three being Liu Weichu, Yang Ruhou, and Lu Jinsheng. Hailed as "China's leading clinician", "one of China's great scholar-physicians" and "one of the leading reformers of Chinese medicine in the early twentieth century", Zhang is notable for being one of the first physicians to intermix Chinese and Western medicine, and his work is credited with allowing doctors to realise that "the two medicines could work side by side". In his 2014 work Acupuncture and Chinese Medicine, Charles Buck praises his "genuine altruistic impetus to improve Chinese medicine", describing Zhang as a "passionate integrationist" of medicine.

== See also ==
- List of physicians
