= Nan Gilbert Seymour =

American physician

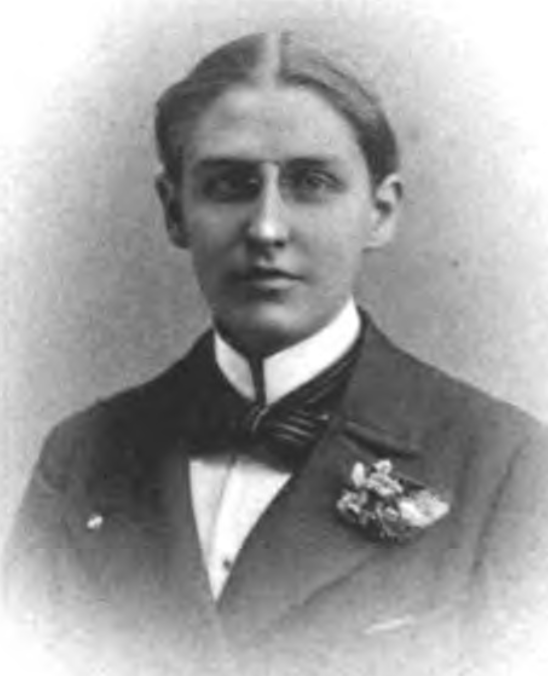
- Seymour, from the 1897 yearbook of Cornell University
- Born: August 4, 1875; Peekskill, New York, U.S.
- Died: May 27, 1940 (aged 64); New York, New York, U.S.
- Occupations: Physician, hospital administrator

Nan Gilbert Seymour (August 4, 1875 – May 27, 1940) was an American physician and hospital administrator. She was medical director of the Salvation Army's William Booth Memorial Hospital from its founding. She also co-founded a cardiac care home in Connecticut.

== Early life and education ==
Seymour was born in Peekskill, New York, the daughter of Frederick Seymour and Cornelia S. Clarke Seymour. Her father was a musician. She graduated from Cornell University in 1897, and earned her medical degree there in 1902. At Cornell, she co-founded the Women's Boating Club with Emily Barringer, who also became a physician. Seymour and Anna Irene Von Sholly were both among the honor roll graduates in their 1902 medical school class, which also included Stella Stevens Bradford.

== Career ==
Seymour served her residency at Methodist Episcopal Hospital in Philadelphia from 1902 to 1903. In 1903 she and John H. Huddleston established New York City's first tuberculosis clinic at Gouverneur Hospital. She also founded a cardiac clinic at Gouverneur Hospital, and chaired its social services program. Beginning in 1905 she was attending physician at the Salvation Army Rescue and Maternity Home, which became the William Booth Memorial Hospital and the Margaret Strachen Home.

In 1914 Seymour testified in the Catherine O'Rourke case, having examined O'Rourke. In 1916, with Lewis A. Conner, she opened a convalescent care home for cardiac patients in Sharon, Connecticut. During World War I she helped establish a Red Cross program for the families of disabled soldiers and sailors. In the 1920s, she served on a planning committee for the Gotham Hospital with Connie Guion and Florence Rena Sabin. In 1936, she and four colleagues objected to the construction of a playground at Stuyvesant Square, saying it would disturb patient care and recovery at nearby Booth Memorial Hospital.

In 1924 Seymour was elected a Fellow of the New York Academy of Medicine. She was also a fellow of the American Medical Association.

== Personal life ==
Seymour was described as "a woman of the vigorous masculine type, dresses in a masculine style and wears her hair closely cropped, man-fashion." She died in 1940, at the age of 64, in New York City. She left an inheritance to her niece, Katherine O'Donnell.
