= Ted Eisenberg =

American plastic surgeon

Dr. Ted Eisenberg
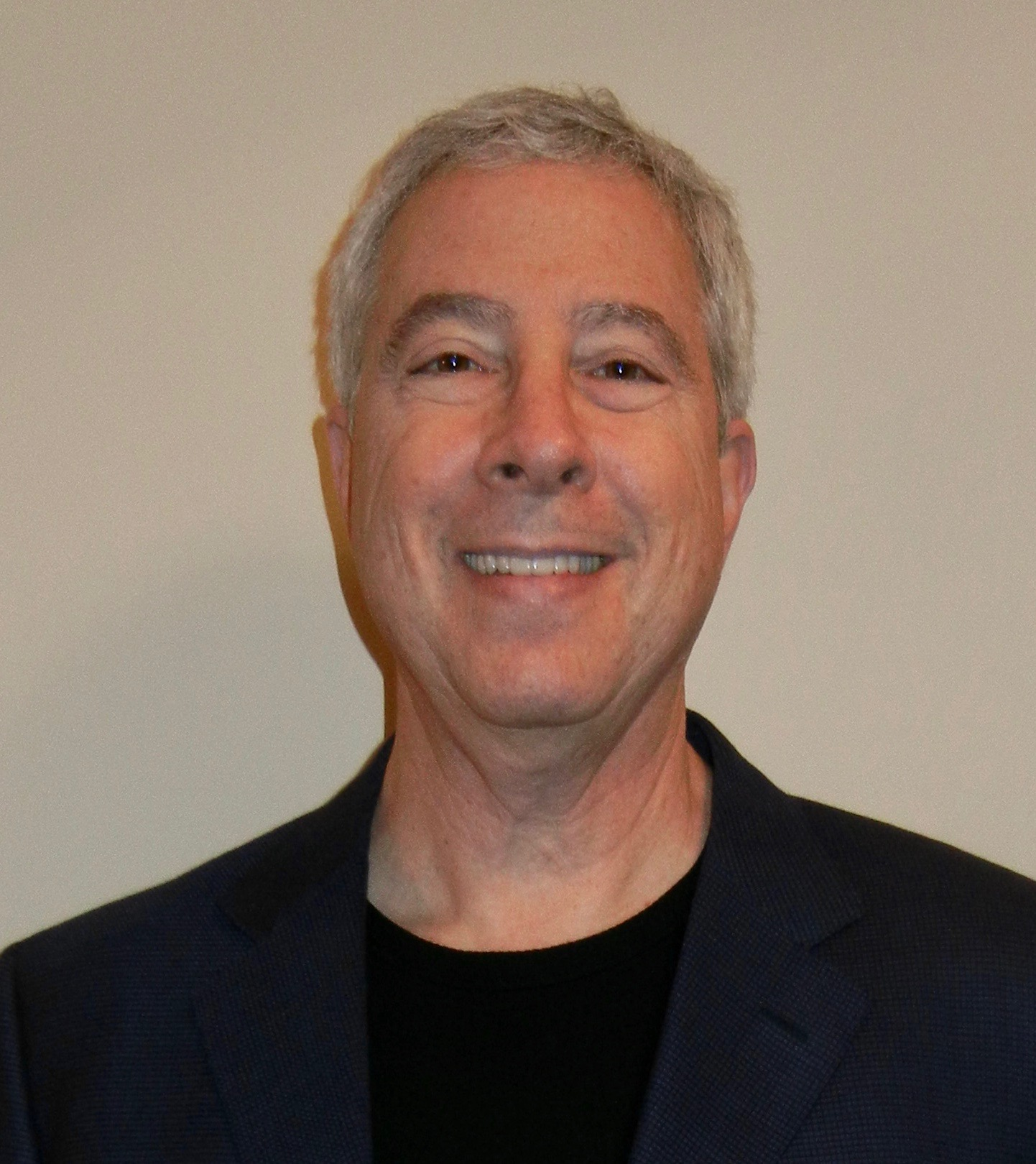
- Born: June 21, 1952 (age 73)
- Occupation: Plastic Surgeon
- Spouse: Joyce Eisenberg (1973–present)
- Children: 2
- Website: lookingnatural.com

Ted Eisenberg D.O. is a Philadelphia, Pennsylvania based plastic surgeon who specializes in cosmetic breast surgery. He holds a Guinness World Record for the most breast augmentation surgeries performed in a lifetime (male)— 3460.

== Early years ==
Eisenberg was born in Philadelphia, Pennsylvania, the son of Martin (a graphic artist) and Mollie (a housewife), and graduated from Overbrook High School (Philadelphia). He received a B.S. in pre-medicine from the Pennsylvania State University and graduated from the Philadelphia College of Osteopathic Medicine. He trained in General Surgery at Metropolitan Hospital and Plastic Surgery at Thomas Jefferson University, Albert Einstein Medical Center Northern Division and Hahnemann Hospital. He married Joyce Kirschner in 1973 and has a son, Benjamin, and a daughter, Samantha.

== Career ==
Much of Eisenberg's early work in the mid-1980s involved the use of tissue expansion for reconstructive surgery. He implanted tissue expanders for a total nasal reconstruction after cancer surgery; to repair a scalp that was scarred from shrapnel wounds incurred by a Marine during the Korean War; to build a breast for a young woman with Poland syndrome; and to expand a contracted eye socket in order to provide a silicone foundation as require for an acrylic eye prosthesis. Eisenberg's research on Dupuytren's contracture is published in a French monograph. For over a decade, he served on a national committee that evaluates the standards for plastic surgery residencies. He was National Chairman of the Plastic and Reconstructive Surgery Division of the American College of Osteopathic Surgeons and served on the certifying board of the American Osteopathic Board of Surgery.

Since 1999, Eisenberg has focused his practice solely on cosmetic breast surgery: augmentation mammoplasty, mastopexy (breast lift), correction of breast asymmetry, and breast reduction. He has contributed articles on the trade-offs between saline versus silicone breast implants, a new one-stage approach to correcting tuberous breast deformity with saline implants, minimizing post-operative nausea and vomiting, and a novel use of the StratticeTM patch for breast implant exposure. In a study of his 4761 augmentation mammaplasty patients, Eisenberg reported that overfilling saline breast implants 10-13% significantly reduced the rupture-deflation rate to 1.83% at 8-years post-implantation.

An authority on simultaneous augmentation mastopexy, Eisenberg is the creator of the IDEAL Breast Lift, a technique to previsualize the extent of tissue to be removed to achieve symmetry and maximum lift. He teaches his technique to surgeons around the country. Eisenberg was named a Fellow in the American College of Osteopathic Surgeons and is an associate professor of surgery at Philadelphia College of Osteopathic Medicine.

== Awards and community contributions ==
In 1993, Dr. Eisenberg was nominated for the Knight Legion of Goodness Award by the Italian-American Press. In 2009, Dr. Eisenberg achieved a Guinness World Record for the most breast augmentation surgeries performed in a lifetime (male)— 3,460. With Joyce K. Eisenberg, he co-authored The Scoop on Breasts: A Plastic Surgeon Busts the Myths, in 2012. Dr. Eisenberg was a longtime corporate sponsor of the Linda Creed Breast Cancer Foundation, whose core program was to provide free mammograms for women with little or no medical insurance.

== Hobbies ==
A tournament knife thrower, Eisenberg is a member of the International Knife Throwers Hall of Fame and is ranked 18th in the world. In 2009, he participated in his first tomahawk (axe) throwing competition; he is the 2018 world champion in the long distance tomahawk competition. He is also an amateur ballroom dancer; he and his wife competed in a pre-show event during a "Dancing With the Stars" tour.
