= Wilhelm Frederick von Ludwig =

German physician (1790–1865)

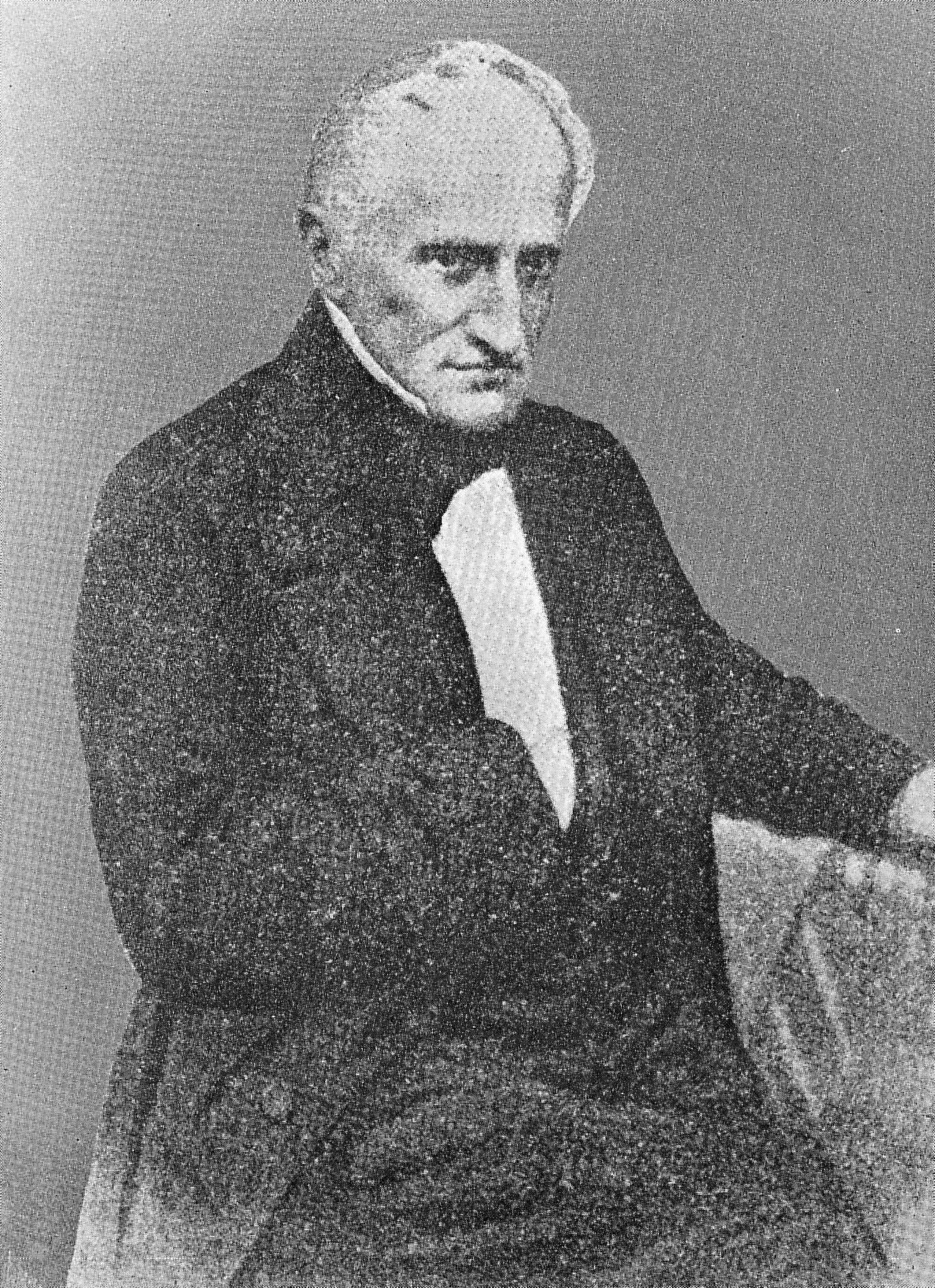

Wilhelm Frederick von Ludwig (16 September 1790 – 14 December 1865) was a German medical doctor known for his 1836 publication on the condition now known as Ludwig's angina.

== Early life ==
Ludwig was born in Uhlbach (near Stuttgart) in the state of Württemberg. His father was a clergyman and served as his childhood teacher. At the age of 10, he was sent to attend the Latin school at Markgröningen. Ludwig showed promise in medicine at an early age, and at 14, he went to Neuenburg to continue his classical studies while beginning to study medicine under a surgeon. Ludwig received a certificate of proficiency in 1807, whereupon he went on to study surgery, medicine, and obstetrics at the University of Tübingen. His performance was so exemplary that he was awarded a gold medal by King Frederick I in 1809—before graduating—for the advancement of surgery. In July 1811, Ludwig received his doctorate.

Unfortunately, before he could commence his study tour, Napoleon attempted to conquer Russia, and previously exempt students were called to service. Ludwig served initially as the doctor for 3rd Infantry at the Schorndorf garrison, and subsequently as director for the Württemberg field hospital at Smolensk in 1812.

He contracted typhus and was captured by the Russians; after recovering from typhus, he served as a Russian noblewoman's personal physician. Once he was freed from Russian capture in 1814, Ludwig returned home and directed a typhus hospital in Hohenheim, where he completed his military service in 1815.

== Career ==
Shortly after leaving the military, Ludwig was honored with title of full professor of surgery and obstetrics at Tübingen in 1815. Before fulfilling it, however, he commenced his initially planned study tour that had been put off in light of the war. Upon returning to Tübingen in 1816, Ludwig, having experienced the equipment available at other facilities in Germany, immediately supplemented Tübingen clinic's own supplies and reference literature with his own salary.

When supplies were similarly lacking in the following year, Ludwig petitioned the king for a higher salary. In response, Ludwig was appointed as one of King Wilhelm I's personal physicians (King Frederick had died the previous year). Ludwig remained in Tübingen until a successor could take his place in 1817.

When Ludwig went to Stuttgart to serve the king, he was quickly recognized as a great diagnostician, and he was soon promoted to be the royal family's chief physician.

He remained in Stuttgart for most of the remainder of his life; between 1835 and 1846, he served as director of the medical college, president of the Württemberg Medical Association, and chairman of the first Stuttgart scientific congress's medical section.

Ludwig published his now-famous paper on Ludwig's angina with no title in 1836. A colleague dubbed the condition "Angina Ludovici" (Ludwig's angina) a year later.

== Later life ==
Ludwig retired in 1855 at the age of 65. He never married.

Beginning only in his seventies, the physician developed several health problems, including a bladder stone removed during 1865 in two separate sessions a few months apart. He died December 1865 a week after the onset of an unspecified neck inflammation, which was probably not the condition that bears his name.
