= Stefan Schurig =

Stefan Schurig (born 1971) is the Secretary General of the Foundations Platform F20, an international network of foundations and philanthropic organizations.

He is an architect by training and has been devoting most of his professional career to climate change and energy issues and to transforming cities into sustainable systems. Before he was the Director Climate Energy at the World Future Council (WFC) in 2007 he was the spokesperson for Greenpeace in Germany for almost 10 years. From 1998 until 2007 he was also member of the Senior Management Team of Greenpeace and headed the Climate and Energy department for five years. In the year 1999 he also co-founded Germany's nationwide green electricity supplier Greenpeace Energy.

Between 2003 and 2006 he had been appointed member of the REALISE Forum, an international platform on renewable energy policies led by the European Commission. As Director Climate Energy at the World Future Council he initiated the international policy campaign on climate change, renewable energy and sustainable city development.

In 2008 Stefan Schurig became a member of the energy advisory board of the International Building Exhibition (IBA) in Hamburg, a five-year urban development project of the city of Hamburg. He is also appointed member of the steering committee of its World Urban Campaign by UN Habitat. He founded and chairs the international Future of Cities Forum, an international think tank gathering on the future of cities.

He was also one of the three executive board members of the World Future Council foundation and member of the executive committee of the global alliance for 100% renewable energy. Additionally, he was a guest lecturer at the HafenCity University Hamburg.
