= Ken Evoy =

Canadian physician

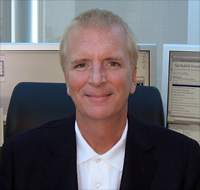
- Born: September 25, 1953 (age 72); Montreal, Quebec, Canada
- Occupation: Founder and Chairman of the Board of SiteSell Inc.
- Spouse: Janice Isomura (m. 1985)
- Children: 2

Ken Evoy (born September 25, 1953) is the founder and chairman of the board of SiteSell and was one of Canada's most productive toy makers in the 1990s. Evoy's game design company (named Isovoy Inc. - a mix of his and his wife's surnames) went on to create and license more than 20 toy creations between 1985 and 1998.

This history in business, along with the education that resulted from his graduating McGill University with an M.D. in 1979, helped Evoy create SiteSell Inc. This company designs and develops a hosted "web business-building system" called SBI! 3.0. Evoy's claim is to use his knowledge of the Internet marketing industry to help "small small businesses" succeed on the Internet.

Evoy's evolution in the online marketing industry has led to the popularity of the online term "pre-selling" which was first used in his company's online newsletter geared to affiliates "5 Pillar Report" back in July 1999: "Remember when we talk about pre-selling? What you write will directly affect how many people click-through...So take your time and get it right."

Years later, he would go on to elaborate on the topic while being interviewed on the radio.

"Pre-selling is not about hard-selling your product, it's about becoming an expert in the eyes of your visitor by delivering this great information. And once you've accomplished that, the final step, obviously, is about monetizing. How do I monetize this targeted traffic that's coming in, that's believing in me, and turning that into income?" "Radio Interview". The Peter Anthony Holder Show. November 7, 2005.

== Biography ==
=== Early years ===
Raised in the Montreal area, Evoy attended Loyola High School (Montreal) and graduated from McGill University with first class honors. He entered Medicine at McGill University in 1975, completing his internship in 1980. Evoy practiced as an emergency physician from 1980 to 1990. He was one of three physicians, along with Marc Afilalo and Ivan Steiner, who was responsible for hiring and training 200 physicians in pre-hospital emergency care at Montreal's newly founded EMS system, Corporation des Urgences Sante du Montreal Metropolitain ("Urgences Santé"). He later practiced as a full-time emergency physician at Hôpital du Sacré-Coeur de Montréal and the Sir Mortimer B. Davis Jewish General Hospital.
