= Stanley K. Bernstein =

Canadian physician

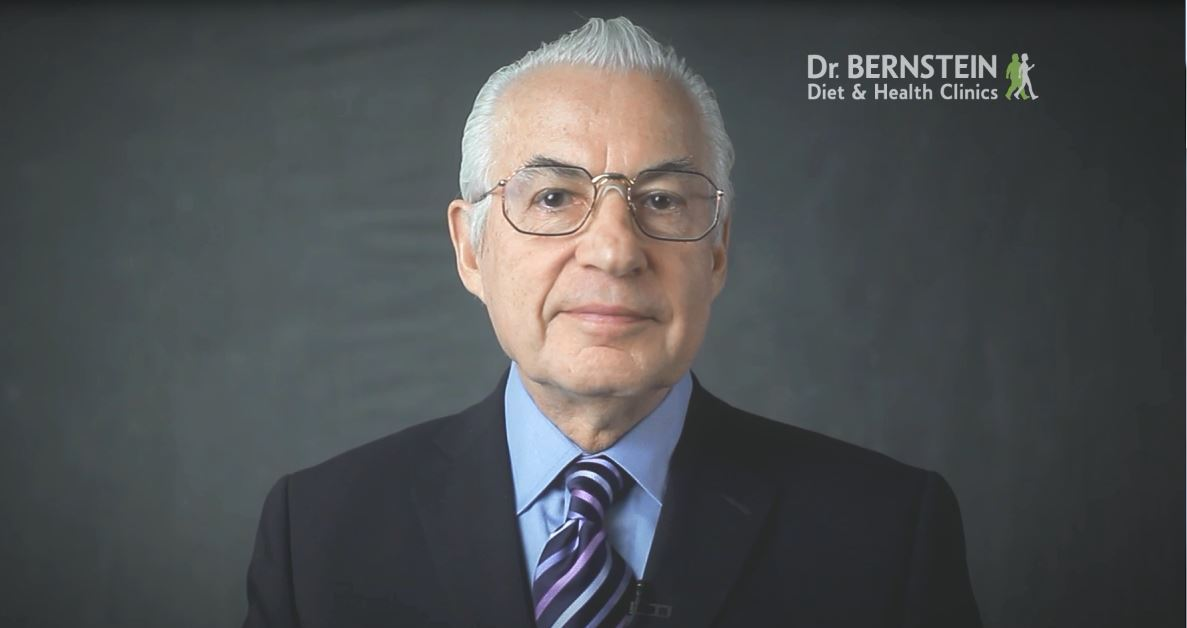
- Born: Toronto, Ontario, Canada
- Education: University of Toronto (MD)
- Occupation: Physician
- Spouse: Judy Bernstein

Stanley K. Bernstein is a Canadian physician. Bernstein has owned and operated weight-loss clinics since 1974.

== Early life and education ==
Bernstein was raised near the Moss Park area of Toronto by Polish immigrant parents who owned a used clothing outlet called Bernstein's Second Hand Store on Queen East. Bernstein graduated from the University of Toronto in 1966 and followed this by interning at Mount Sinai Hospital in Toronto.

== Career ==
=== Establishing the Dr. Bernstein Diet & Health Clinics ===
After completing his internship, Bernstein set up a general family practice in 1967 near Gerrard and Greenwood in Toronto, and was also involved in geriatric work at Baycrest Centre.

In 1972, Bernstein traveled to Las Vegas to attend a conference hosted by the American Society of Bariatric Physicians. It was at this conference where Bernstein learned about a group of physicians who were using what was called the Simeons Approach as a way to help patients achieve weight loss. In order to achieve weight loss, the Simeons Approach prescribed a very low-calorie intake and injections of a hormone called Human Chorionic Gonadotropin, or hCG, a hormone produced by pregnant women to break down fat stores thought to feed the baby.

Bernstein returned to Toronto and began using this knowledge to treat patients at his practice by helping them achieve a state of Ketosis. Subsequently, Bernstein opened his first dedicated weight-loss clinic at the Richmond-Adelaide Centre of Toronto in 1977 and in 1978, his second clinic in Toronto's Yorkville neighbourhood and his third in 1978 at Yonge and Eglinton, also in Toronto. By the early 2000s, Bernstein had 14 diet clinics in Ontario. Over the next few years, his practice expanded to Ottawa, Vancouver, Edmonton and Calgary. Around 2005, Bernstein opened his first American clinics in Virginia and Florida.

As of 2010, Bernstein owned and operated 62 clinics across Canada, treating nearly 10,000 active patients. It is estimated that Bernstein's clinics have treated approximately 450,000 patients over the years, including Canadian Archbishop Marcel Gervais and comedian Mike Bullard, who appeared in company advertisements for a period of time.

The clinic network ceased operations in 2025.

=== Use of hCG ===
Starting in 1979, the Ontario College of Physicians and Surgeons warned against the use of hCG in the treatment of obesity due to the lack of scientific evidence concerning the effects of its use. The Ontario College also warned against a 500-calorie diet used in conjunction with hCG treatment, citing the treatment's risk to a patient's health. Several doctors, including Bernstein, continued to administer and use hCG in their weight-loss treatments. In 1987, the Ontario College formally banned hCG as a weight-loss treatment.

=== Use of vitamin B ===
Following the ban on hCG, Bernstein discontinued using hCG injections as part of his diet program and replaced it with injections of a Vitamin B complex, the exact composition of which is a closely guarded secret. While on Bernstein's diet program, patients are administered Vitamin B injections multiple times a week and are instructed to maintain an intake of 800 to 1,500 calories per day on a strict diet regimen.

=== Canadian Medical Association Journal editorial ===
In February 2009, Bernstein publicly complained that an editorial in the Canadian Medical Association Journal (CMAJ) concerning commercial diets unfairly targeted his clinics. CMAJ's editorial commented on commercial diet clinics and specifically their pattern of manipulating patients with false hopes and using medically unproven weight-loss techniques. As evidence of the latter, CMAJ's editorial specifically pointed out the use of Vitamin B injections.

Bernstein's use of Vitamin B injections as part of his weight-loss program has met with skepticism and a lack of agreement by multiple members of the medical community.

=== Glenn Duffin controversy ===
In 1988, Glenn Duffin, a thirty-one-year-old Canadian died of cardiac arrhythmia eight days after beginning Bernstein's diet program. Following Duffin's death, a jury concluded that his death was caused by stress brought about by family and financial issues and Bernstein's diet program. The jury also advised that patients using commercial weight-loss programs should be encouraged to lose no more than two pounds a week when considering a diet of 1,200 calories per day. Duffin's family filed a malpractice suit against Bernstein and was awarded $700,000 in damages in an out-of-court settlement.

=== Litigation against medical colleagues ===
Bernstein has been a part of a number of litigation suits involving the proprietary secrets of his weight-loss clinics and his Vitamin B-based weight-loss program. In 2007, Bernstein brought to court Daniela Stoytcheva-Todorova and Vesselin Todorov under allegations that their weight-loss clinic, Veda Healthy Weight Loss Centre Inc., used trade secrets and confidential information belonging to Bernstein. Bernstein ended up discontinuing all claims against Todorov and Todorova. In 2009, Bernstein sought litigation against Dr. Nadia Brown under similar claims, and, following this, in 2011, Bernstein filed suit against Dr. Scott Seagrist, a former partner at two of Bernstein's clinics, and his spouse, seeking $10.5 million in damages under allegations that Seagrist had improperly used trade secrets to begin his own weight-loss clinic. Bernstein's lawsuit against Seagrist was settled in an out-of-court agreement.

=== Litigation against Pat Poon ===
In September 2009, Bernstein launched a lawsuit against Pat Poon, a Canadian weight-loss doctor who operates four weight-loss clinics in the Greater Toronto Area. In the lawsuit, Bernstein argued that Poon had defamed Bernstein in Poon's book Dr. Poon's Metabolic Diet, as well as in a subsequent television show that Poon was a guest on. Dr. Poon's Metabolic Diet book has numerous breathing techniques for assisting with passing large bowel movements.

After a six-year lawsuit, the judge ruled in Bernstein’s favor, awarding $10,000 to Bernstein in damages.[12] In making the final decision, the judge admitted that the trial was more than a reputational dispute, saying, “It is more about turf warfare in the competitive world of diet medicine than about reputation”.[11]

=== Formal caution by CPSO over advertising ===
In April 2014, the College of Physicians and Surgeons of Ontario ruled that Bernstein had repeatedly breached rules established by the College by advertising his weight-loss clinics through customer testimonials, before and after photos and medically unproven, superlative language. The College also ruled that Bernstein had acted against medical standards by connecting himself with the sale of his product, in this case, his diet clinics. As a result, Bernstein was instructed to appear before the College for a verbal warning.

In May 2014, it was reported that Bernstein was set to contest the formal caution imposed on him by the College of Physicians and Surgeons.

In February 2015, the Health Professions Appeal and Review Board dismissed a protest from Bernstein and his request that a formal caution on his use of advertising be thrown out. The appeal board found that previous investigations into the complaint that Bernstein had violated advertising rules were “adequate and reasonable”. The appeal board requested that further investigation be done into whether Bernstein was guilty of “steering” members of the public to visit doctors in his own clinics, which is a violation of rules.

=== Litigation against Norma and Ronauld Walton ===
In October 2013 Bernstein applied for an order for inspectorship over 31 jointly owned properties with The Rose & Thistle Group owners and Toronto attorneys, Norma and Ronauld Walton. In November 2013 he petitioned their entire real estate portfolio into receivership without notice to the lenders.

Bernstein and the Waltons were legal partners in a property investment agreement, in which Bernstein financed the ventures and the Waltons were responsible for the finances, bookkeeping, accounting and filing of tax returns. By 2013, Bernstein had invested $110 million into 31 different projects through the Rose & Thistle Group.

Bernstein's receivership caused the portfolio to go into automatic default across all 31 joint entities and receivership and power of sale of the portfolio followed by Schonfeld & Associates, receivers.

In 2016, Bernstein was awarded $66.9 million in damages also by Justice Newbould via application. The Waltons asked for a trial but that request was denied by the Court.

The Waltons have communicated publicly that they "strongly disagree" with the accusations and have appealed the findings of Ontario Superior Court's ordered investigation.

=== Litigation with Trez Capital ===
In 2015 Trez Capital sued Bernstein for over $14 million, alleging fraud and deceit. Trez Capital, a mortgage lender, financed four of the projects owned by Rose & Thistle and Bernstein.

Bernstein brought a motion to dismiss Trez's claim on the basis of his and his CFO James Reitan’s evidence that Trez knew about their claim in September 2013 and thus were outside of the limitation period for filing. During a mini trial, the judge did not accept the testimony of Bernstein and Reitan as credible in comparison to the evidence of Coscia. Bernstein later appealed to the Court of Appeal and lost.

Bernstein has now paid Trez money to settle the Trez litigation that alleged fraud and deceit. He paid this money pursuant to a Pierringer Agreement that mandates confidentiality of the amount paid by him. An amended Statement of Claim is being filed with the Court accordingly.

== Personal life ==
Bernstein married his second wife, Judy Bernstein, in 1992. They later divorced in 2024. Bernstein also has three adult sons, one who is a radiologist in New York City, one a lawyer, and the third son, a business graduate who works at Bernstein's clinics.

=== Professional controversy ===
In 1977, Bernstein was instructed to testify before the Discipline Committee of the College of Physicians and Surgeons of Ontario in allegations that he had inappropriate sexual relations with Jo-Anne Johnston, who was mentally fragile and a patient of his from 1970 to 1973. The Committee concluded that Bernstein was guilty of the charge and disciplined Bernstein with a suspension from practice for 12 months, as well as a fine of $4,500. Bernstein successfully appealed this ruling and the guilty charge, fine and suspension were removed from his record.

=== Criminal controversies ===
In 1992, Bernstein was arrested alongside Peter Gassyt and Arnold Markowitz, who were arrested and charged in a conspiracy to murder a business colleague and a friend. In the trial that followed, both Gassyt and Markowitz were charged with a conspiracy to murder, and in 1993, the two were convicted on a sole count of conspiracy to commit murder. At the time of Bernstein's arrest, undercover officers undertook an unannounced search of Bernstein's residence, where they found $2 million in stolen goods, including 24 Rolex watches. As a result, along with conspiracy to murder, Bernstein was also charged with possession of stolen property. Both charges were later dropped.

In 1998, Bernstein, along with his wife, were robbed at gunpoint in their Toronto residence and bound and forced into the trunk of Bernstein's Mercedes. The assailants emptied Bernstein's safe of valuables and fled. Both Bernstein and his wife were unharmed in the robbery and the assailants were never captured.
