= Steven Clark Cunningham =

American surgeon (born 1972)

- Born: June 19, 1972 (age 54); Denver, Colorado, United States
- Education: George Washington University
- Occupation: Surgeon
- Known for: Pancreatic surgery, liver surgery
- Medical career
- Sub-specialties: Pancreatic and hepatobiliary surgery

Steven Clark Cunningham (born June 19, 1972) is an American surgeon. He is known for dealing with medical conditions relating to pancreatic, biliary, and liver surgery.

== Early life and education ==
Born in Denver, Colorado; Steven Clark Cunningham received his medical degree from George Washington University. He did his residency in general surgery at University of Maryland Medical Center. He also completed fellowships in both oncology research and pancreatic and hepatobiliary surgery at Johns Hopkins University and Hospital. He completed yet another fellowship in neuroscience research at the National Institute on Aging

== Medical career ==
Steven Clark Cunningham started his medical career as a surgeon in Baltimore, Maryland with special focus on general surgery, pancreatic surgery, hepatobiliary surgery, and surgical oncology.

In 2010, Cunningham joined St. Agnes Hospital staff and continued to render medical surgical services in his areas of specialization. He focuses more on patients requiring liver and pancreatic surgery at the hospital. He was promoted to be the director of pancreatic and hepatobiliary surgery at St Agnes Hospital. He also serves as director of research and as the cancer liaison physician at Saint Agnes Hospital and Cancer Institute for the American College of Surgeons’ Commission on Cancer.

Cunningham has been a contributor and editor with contributions to a variety of medical journals, guidelines, textbooks and clinical publications. He has carried out medical research and published articles on pancreatic and hepatobiliary diseases, as well as on patient safety and surgical education.

Cunningham is board-certified in General Surgery and also certified by the American Hepato-Pancreato-Biliary Association. He is a Member of the Society for Gastrointestinal and Endoscopic Surgeons, the International and Americas Hepato-Pancreato-Biliary Associations, the Society for Surgery of the Alimentary Tract, the Society of Surgical Oncology, and the Association for Academic Surgery. He is also as a Fellow of the American College of Surgeons.

== Literary career ==
Steven Cunningham has interest in poetry and he writes poems. His bilingual book of Children's poetry, entitled Dinosaur Name Poems, was selected as the winner of two 2009 Moonbeam Children's Book Awards, in two categories, Spanish language and children's poetry. He has served as a contributing editor to Maryland Poetry Review. His second book of poetry, "Poemenclature: Poems About Your Body," was published by the Under The Maple Tree imprint of Knox Robinson Press in 2017 and then republished by Three Conditions Press in 2020, when it won the 2020 Moonbeam Children's Award (Gold Medal in the category of health issues), first place as "children title" and second place as "poetry title" in the 26th Annual Colorado Independent Publishers Association CIPA awards, and was a finalist in the "medical" and "picture books: all ages" categories of the National Indie Excellence Awards.

== Personal life ==
Cunningham lives in Ellicott City with his wife and four children.

== See also ==
- Hepatectomy
- Pancreatectomy
- Children's poetry
