= Robert George Clements =

Irish physician and murderer

- Born: 6 September 1882; Limerick, Ireland
- Died: May 30, 1947 (aged 66); Southport, England
- Cause of death: Suicide

Details
- Victims: 1–4
- Span of crimes: 1920–1947
- Country: England

Robert George Clements (6 September 1880 – 30 May 1947) was a physician and a fellow of the Royal College of Surgeons from Belfast, Northern Ireland.

Clements is suspected of the murder of his fourth wife, who died of morphine poisoning. His first three wives also died before him, raising suspicions that he murdered them as well. Clements carried out suicide by an overdose of morphine before the police came to arrest him.

== Life ==
Clements was born in 1882 in Limerick, Ireland. He graduated in 1904, aged 24.

== Marriages and deaths ==
Clements married four times, three of his four wives were heiresses. His first wife, Edith (or Edyth) Annie Mercier, who was active in the Ulster Women's Unionist Council and the daughter of a wealthy Belfast grain merchant, Dufferin Flour and Meal Mills owner William Turpin Mercier, died of "sleeping sickness" in 1920, aged 40. His second wife, Mary McCreary, was the daughter of an Irish industrialist based in Manchester; her 1925 death was ascribed to endocarditis, at aged 25.

His third wife, Sarah Kathleen Burke (known as Kathleen), died on 27 May 1939, which was ascribed to endocarditis, and was quickly cremated, though the police had made an attempt to halt the cremation. By all accounts, Clements' had genuine affection for Burke.

His last wife, Amy Victoria "Vee" Barnett, (often written as Burnett) was the daughter of one of Clements's few patients, Reginald W. G. Barnett, the wealthy managing director of the Liverpool Cartage Company, who had died suddenly in January 1940, six months before his daughter's wedding. The last Mrs Clements died on 27 May 1947, under suspicious circumstances, in Southport. The previous day, Clements had called in another doctor when his wife fell ill. She was taken to the Ashley Bank Nursing Home, where she died the next day. Both Clements and the other doctor diagnosed myeloid leukemia, which was confirmed by a botched post-mortem carried out by another physician, James Houston.

The circumstances of this latest death caused people at the time to question the deaths of Clements's first three wives, of whom the first and second were wealthy women when he married them and were almost penniless at the time of their deaths. Clements had signed the death certificates himself, and although there had been some suspicions voiced following the death of his third wife, there was no opportunity to perform a post-mortem, as by then her body had already been cremated.

A second autopsy was conducted on Mrs Clements by a Dr Grace, who deduced that she had died from morphine poisoning. This was confirmed by Dr J.B. Firth, Director of the Home Office Laboratory in Preston. Clements is thought to have murdered his wife in order to inherit her money.

When the police came to arrest Clements, they found that he had committed suicide, by way of an overdose of morphine. Clements was found to have died on 30 May 1947, at 20, Promenade, Southport. He left an estate valued for probate at £18,047, on which probate was granted to Robert George Wilson Clements, a farmer. Amy Victoria Clements was found to have left an estate valued at £56,180, equivalent to £1,900,562 in 2025.

When Houston learned that his post-mortem had missed the presence of morphine, he, too, committed suicide.

== See also ==
- Dr John Bodkin Adams
- George Chapman
- Dr Thomas Neill Cream
- Dr Jeffrey MacDonald
- Dr William Palmer
- List of serial killers by country
