= Caroline Sanford Finley =

American doctor (1875–1936)

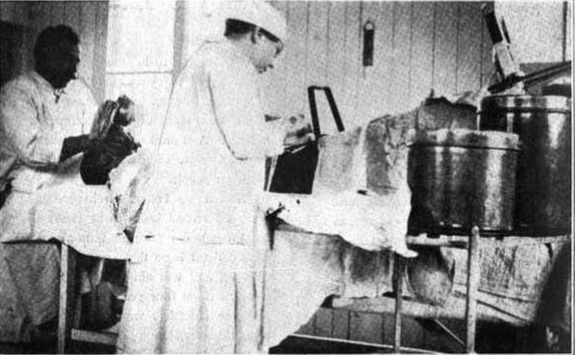
- Finley operating in her fracture ward, 1918
- Born: 1875; New York, U.S.
- Died: 1936 (aged 60–61)
- Education: Cornell Medical School
- Awards: Croix de Guerre

Caroline Sanford Finley (1875—1936) was an American doctor who led the Women’s Oversea Hospitals unit, an all-female medical unit in World War I. She was also a suffragist whose overseas medical work was supported by the National American Woman Suffrage Association (NAWSA). Finley was a recipient of the French Croix de Guerre.

== Early life and career ==
Finley was born in New York in 1875. She attended Cornell University Medical College. She was one of the top ten students in her class, graduating in 1901. She worked at the New York Infirmary for Women and Children, a medical establishment founded by Elizabeth Blackwell.

Finley was selected by Carrie Chapman Catt and the National American Woman Suffrage Association (NAWSA) to head the Women's Overseas Hospital Unit, whose initial group included 78 American women physicians and nurses. The Women's Overseas Hospital Unit served with the French Service de Santé, which led Finley to receive the rank of French Army Captain.

== Recognition ==
For her "excellent surgical work performed under heavy barrage in France," Finley was awarded the Croix de Guerre, the highest medal of valor in the French military. She was one of three suffragist doctors to received this award. She was also awarded an MBE from the Prince of Wales on the HMS Renown to recognize her work caring for former British prisoners of war who had influenza in Metz.
