= Orestes Fiandra =

Orestes Fiandra (August 4, 1921 in Montevideo, Uruguay – April 22, 2011 in Montevideo, Uruguay), was a professor and researcher in medicine and cardiology in Uruguay.

In 1960 he implanted a pacemaker provided by Rune Elmqvist from the Karolinska Institute of Sweden. This was the first successful pacemaker implant in America.

In 1969, he founded the company "Centro de Construcción de Cardioestimuladores" (CCC), which was recently acquired by Greatbatch.

== Biography ==
Dr. Fiandra graduated as doctor in cardiology from the Facultad de Medicina (Universidad de la República) of the Uruguayan Universidad de la República.

During 1954 and 1955, he stayed in Sweden to work as an intern in the Karolinska Institute. During this stay in Stockholm he met Rune Elmqvist, who worked with external pacemakers to treat atrial-ventricular blocks.

Fiandra suggested Elmqvist using germanium transistor technology and e epoxy resin to develop an implantable pacemaker, allowing patients a greater mobility, but at that time Elmqvist had doubts about the safety of such a device.

On February 3, 1960, together with surgeon Roberto Rubio, he successfully implanted a pacemaker built by the Rune Elmqvist team. The implant was conducted on a young patient who suffered from atrial-ventricular blocks, and persistent cardiac strokes. The procedure, which was carried on in the CASMU 1 hospital in Montevideo, was the first of its kind in America.

Fiandra was one of the founders of the Instituto Nacional de Cirugía Cardíaca (1965) which now takes his name.

In 1969 he founded the company "Centro de Construcción de Cardioestimuladores", which manufactured pacemakers until the year 2010.

He worked as a professor in cardiology in the Facultad de Medicina of the Uruguayan Universidad de la República, and as the director of the cardiology department of the Clínicas hospital in Montevideo. He was an academic in the Academia Nacional de Medicina (Uruguay), member of the New York Academy of Sciences (EUA), president of the Instituto Nacional de Cirugía Cardíaca (Uruguay) and president of the Comisión Honoraria para la Salud Cardiovascular (Uruguay).

He has published over 180 scientific papers and 5 medicine books.

He has registered three patents: "Electrodo de autofijación”, "Electrodo para estimulación eléctrica de tejidos vivos" and “Corazón artificial implantable".

== Some of Fiandra's work ==
• “Marcapasos cardíacos”, Fiandra O. Ed. Estudios Gráficos de CBA srl. Montevideo, 1971.

• “Electrocardiografía”, Fiandra O. Ed. Oficina del Libro - AEM. Montevideo, 1972.

• “Marcapasos Cardíacos”, Fiandra O., Espasandín W., Fiandra H.A., Erramún B., Fiandra D.O., Fernández Barbieri F., Fernández Banizi P., Greatbatch W., Barreraas F., Feldman S., Yahini J., Neufeld H., Suárez Antola R. Ed. Departamento de Cardiología del Hospital de Clínicas e Instituto Nacional de Cirugía Cardíaca. Montevideo, 1975.

• “El electrocardiograma en la cardiopatía isquémica aguda” Fiandra, O., Espasandín, W., Fiandra, H.A., Mussetti, J., Finadra, D., Firstz, A., Pardiñas, C. Ed. AEM Montevideo, 2007.

• “Electrocardiografía 2ed.”, imprenta AEM, editado a solicitud de los estudiantes de medicina, 2010.
