= Gary Onik =

American physician

- Born: 1952 (age 72–73); Brooklyn, New York
- Education: Post-graduate medical degree
- Alma mater: New York Medical College
- Occupation(s): Medical doctor, inventor
- Website: http://www.garyonik.com

Gary Onik (born February 25, 1952, in Brooklyn, New York City) is a medical doctor and inventor. He is known for ultrasound-guided procedures for treating cancer using cryosurgery.

== Inventions ==
Gary Onik is the inventor of ultrasound-guided cryosurgery procedures for the prostate and for the liver.

Onik treated the first liver patients with cryosurgery in 1986 and the first patient with ultrasound-guided prostate cancer cryosurgery in 1990. He developed techniques and instrumentation that have been integral to the minimally invasive treatment of cancer.
