= Martin Schurig =

German physician (1656–1733)

Martin Schurig (1656–1733) was a German physician who first used the term "Gynaecologia" in 1730, following Johann Peter Lotichius who wrote "Gynaicologia" in 1630. Schurig is credited with authoring the first work on sexual pathology, successively entitled Spermatologia (1720), Muliebria (1729), and Gynaecologia (1730).

Schurig was born in the town of Hayne (Großenhain) within the Electorate of Saxony, where his father, Johann, worked as a wheelwright. On July 23, 1671, Martin entered St. Thomas School in Leipzig, committing to a seven-year stay. During his time there, he also enrolled at the University of Leipzig in the summer semester of 1672. On December 22, 1677, Schurig informed Rector Jakob Thomasius of his decision to leave St. Thomas, and he gave his farewell speech on February 26, 1678. In the winter semester of 1677/78, he was re-matriculated at the University of Leipzig, where Johannes Bohn became his teacher in the medical faculty. Schurig earned his medical degree from the University of Erfurt in 1688 and later settled in Dresden. There, he became a city doctor on March 15, 1694, and continued to practice until his death on July 10, 1733. Schurig was married to Sophia Christina Beutler (1666-1713), and they had four sons and three daughters, two of whom survived after his wife's death.

At the age of 64, Schurig began publishing his Spermatologia Historico-Medica, also known simply as Spermatologia. This marked the start of a series of ten books that progressively explored human physiology, with two being published posthumously. Havelock Ellis quotes freely from his works.

== Books ==
- Spermatologia historico-medica. Frankfurt, 1720. On Human Semen. [The male reproductive system.]
- Sialologia historico-medica. Dresden, 1723. On Human Saliva. [Also published in Leipzig, 1729, under the anagram Gurisch.]
- Chylologia historico-medica. Dresden, 1725. On Human Chyle or Nutritional Juice. [The digestive system. Also published in Leipzig, 1730, under the anagram Gurisch.]
- Muliebria historico-medica. Dresden & Leipzig, 1729. On Female Genital Organs. [The female reproductive system.]
- Parthenologia historico-medica. Dresden & Leipzig, 1729. On Virginity and related topics. [Stages of female development, menstruation, and the concept of virginity.]
- Gynaecologia historico-medica. Dresden & Leipzig, 1730. On Female Intercourse.
- Syllepsilogia historico-medica. Dresden & Leipzig, 1731. On Female Conception. [Continuation of Gynaecologia historico-medica.]
- Embryologia historico-medica. Dresden & Leipzig, 1732. On the Human Infant. [Fetal development, pregnancy, and childbirth.]

Posthumous:

- Lithologia historico-medica. Dresden & Leipzig, 1744. On Human Stones.
- Haematologia historico-medica. Dresden & Leipzig, 1744. On Blood.

German translations by Martin Schurig:

- Abraham Leonhard Vrolingh, Der Matrosen Gesundheit / Oder Ein nützlicher Tractat vom Scharbocke oder Schimmel-Seuche. Dresden, 1702.
- David Abercromby, Der Spanische oder Frantzösische Pocken-Meister, Dresden, 1702.
- Augustin Belloste, Hospital- und Lazareth-Chirurgus. Dresden, 1703; 1710.
- Johannes Verbrugge, Examen Chirurgicum. Dresden, 1704; 1708; 1715; 1731.
- Jacques Guillemeau, Der auffrichtige Augen- und Zahn-Artzt. Dresden, 1706; 1710.
- Frederic de Leauson, Operationes Chirurgicae. Dresden, 1709.
- François Mauriceau, Siebenhundert Observationes. Dresden, 1709.
