= Mary Lee Edward =

Canadian surgeon and suffragist

Dr. Mary Lee Edward (1885–1980) was a pioneer, surgeon and suffragist amongst the women in medicine and a hero during World War I on the front lines in France.

== Life and work ==
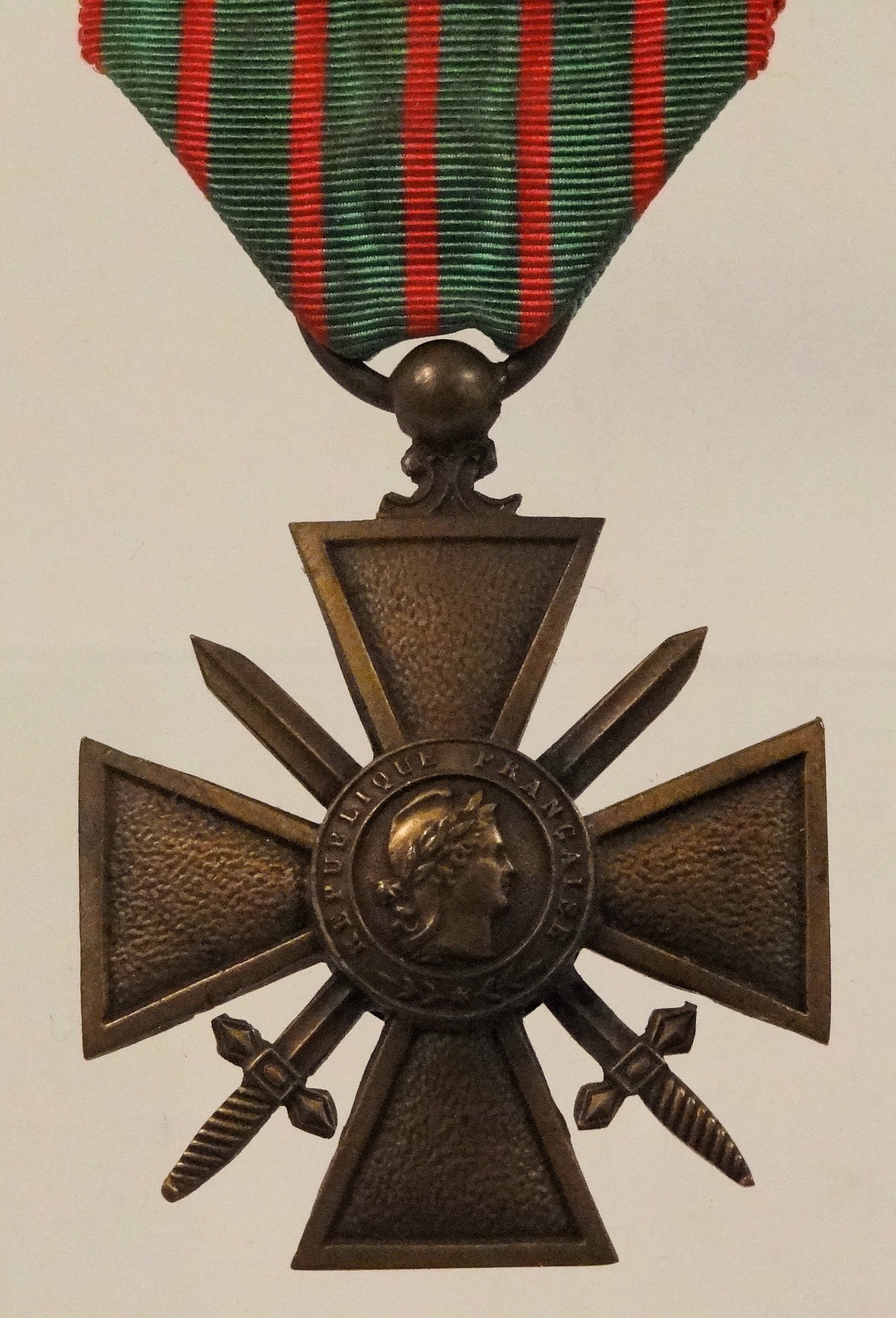
The Croix de Guerre Medal awarded to Dr. Edward for her service.

Edward was born in Petrolia, Ontario, Canada, the daughter of Alexander Clark Edward and Jennie Gertrude Dawson. Interested in research, she moved to the New York Infirmary for Women and Children in New York City, where she was awarded a scholarship to study surgery for a year in Vienna, Austria. On her return to the U.S., she was appointed chief resident surgeon at the Infirmary.

In 1917, she volunteered for overseas military service and joined the American Women's Overseas Hospitals Unit, which she helped organize, supported by the National American Woman Suffrage Association (NAWSA). Arriving in France on February 18, 1918, and as part of the U.S. Tenth Army, she was sent to the Chateau d'Ognon at Senlis, France located at the front lines. There, during the great German offensive in the spring and summer, Edward operated on over 100 casualties in 24 hours and as long as 60 hours at a stretch under enemy fire. For this, she was awarded the Croix de Guerre for her outstanding bravery and her record of valor while under the direction of the French government.

After the war, Dr. Edward returned to her practice in New York City and worked in that capacity until her 85th birthday. She died in New York City in September 1980.

A plaque is erected in her honor at the Assiginack Museum in Manitowaning, Ontario, near the Edwards family cottage. Much of the information above is excerpted or adapted from that plaque.
