= Anthony C. Griffin =

American plastic surgeon

Anthony C. Griffin (born March 1, 1960) is a board certified plastic surgeon member of the American Society of Plastic Surgeons and is a Fellow of the American College of Surgeons. Dr. Griffin participated as one of the surgeons on ABC's series Extreme Makeover, and is the author of "Surgery Without Scars: A Worry-Free, Multi-Cultural Guide to Plastic Surgery Today".

He received his BA from Brown University and his MD from Washington University in St. Louis.
