= James Carson (physician) =

Scottish physician

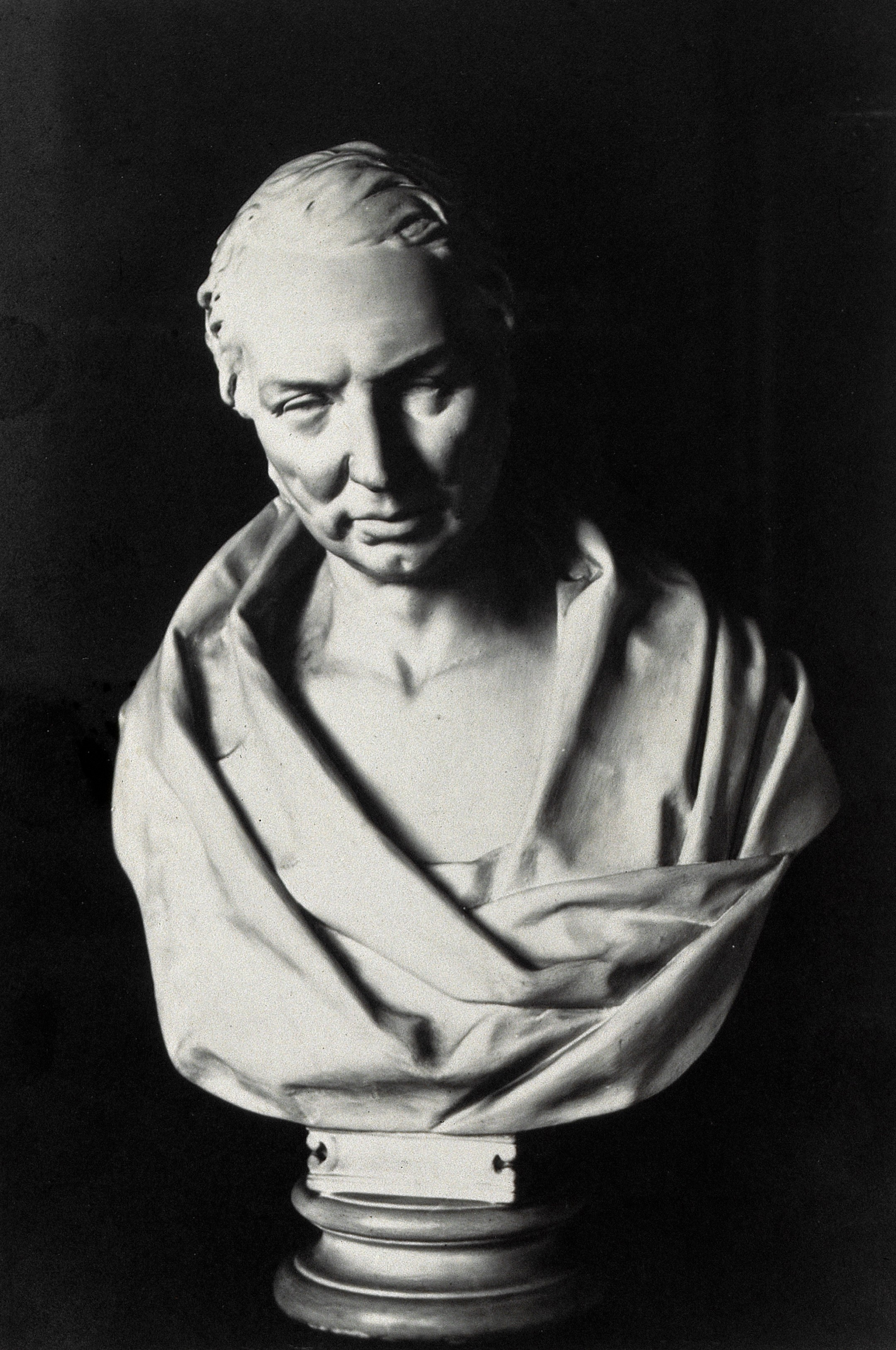
- Born: 1772
- Died: 12 August 1843 (aged 70–71)
- Education: University of Edinburgh
- Medical career
- Profession: physician
- Research: lung physiology

James Carson M.D. FRS (1772–1843) was a Scottish physician.

== Life ==
Carson was originally educated for the ministry, but attended medical classes at the University of Edinburgh, and graduated doctor of medicine there in the autumn of 1799. He then moved to Liverpool, where he remained for most of his professional career.

In 1808 Carson came prominently before the public with the case of Charles Angus, a Liverpool chemist, charged with the murder of Margaret Burns, an alleged poisoning. At the trial held at Lancaster assizes on 2 September that year Carson on Angus's behalf maintained his own opinion as to the cause of death, against that of the four medical witnesses called for the Crown, among whom was John Bostock the younger. A verdict of not guilty was returned.

Carson remained at Liverpool, and subsequently held several posts there. He was elected a fellow of the Royal Society on 1 June 1837. He died at Sutton, St Helens, 12 August 1843.

== Works ==
Carson's inaugural essay at Edinburgh was De Viribus quibus Sanguis circumvehitur (1799). An early paper was "On the Elasticity of the Lungs" (Philosophical Transactions cx. 29–44). In later development of ideas in it, Carson attempted a surgical treatment for tuberculosis, introducing the principle of the collapse of the lung, though he was not able to show a successful practical outcome.

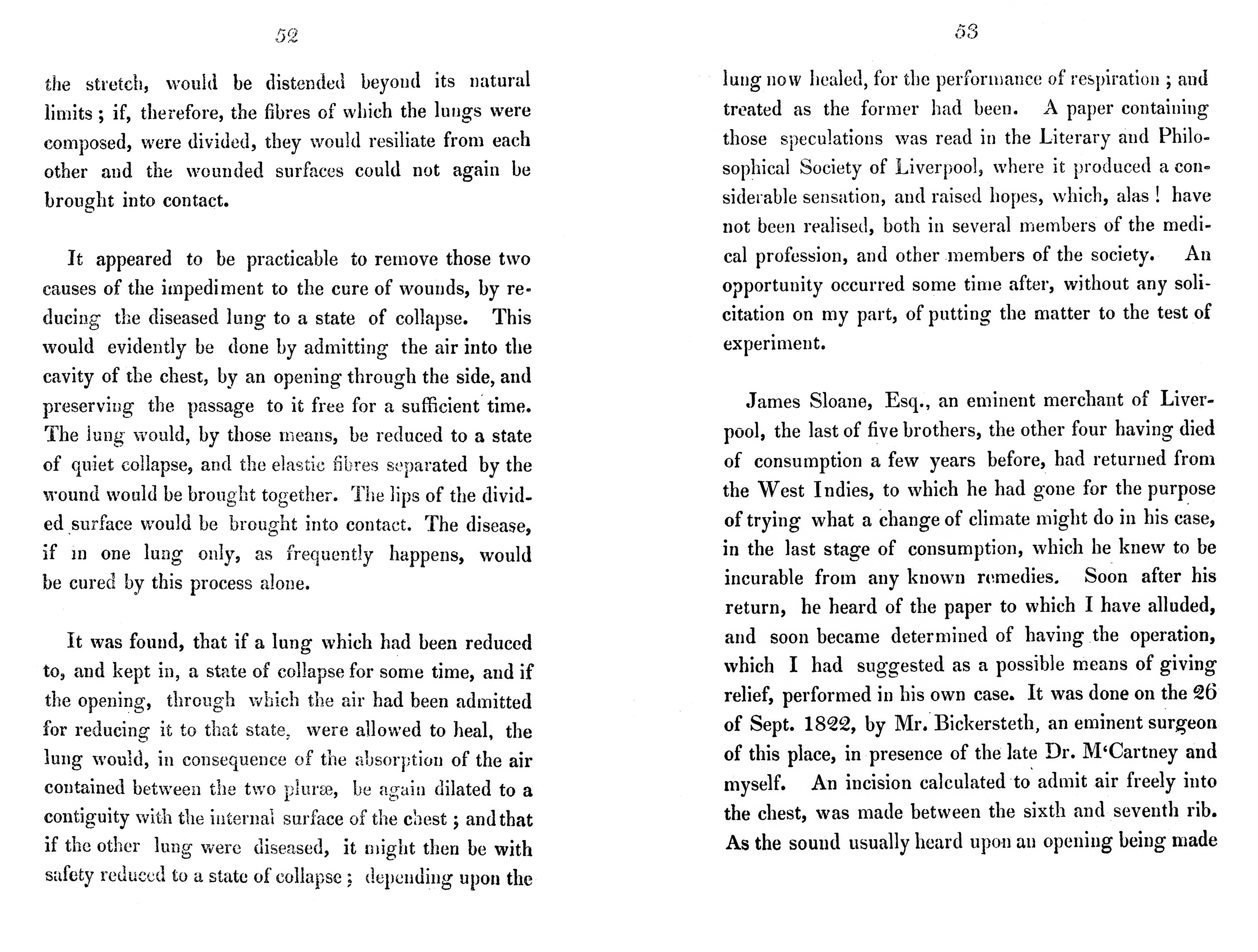
James Carson's discussion of an attempt to perform an artificial pneumothorax

Some angry pamphleteering followed the Angus case, and Carson defended himself in Remarks on a late Publication entitled "A Vindication of the Opinions delivered in Evidence by the Medical Witnesses for the Crown on a late Trial at Lancaster," Liverpool, 1808. Other writings were:

- Reasons for colonizing the Island of Newfoundland, 1813.
- A Letter to the Members of Parliament on the Address of the Inhabitants of Newfoundland to the Prince Regent, 1813.
- An Enquiry into the Causes of the Motion of the Blood, Liverpool, 1815 (second and enlarged edition under the title of An Inquiry into the Causes of Respiration, London, 1833).
- A New Method of slaughtering Animals for Human Food, London, 1839.

== Notes ==
Attribution

This article incorporates text from a publication now in the public domain: Stephen, Leslie, ed. (1887). "Carson, James". Dictionary of National Biography. Vol. 9. London: Smith, Elder & Co.
