= Franc Pust =

Oberrichter of Cadastral municipality of Trbovlje
- In office 1850–1850
- Preceded by: Miha Roš
- Succeeded by: Title dismantled

Mayor of local municipality of Trbovlje
- In office 1850 – March 9, 1871
- Succeeded by: Franc Kalan

Personal details
- Born: August 13, 1814
- Died: March 9, 1871 (aged 56)
- Children: Franc Pust III. Feliks Pust

Franc Pust (August 13, 1814 – March 9, 1871) was a Slovenian farmer, landlord and politician who served as Trbovlje's last Oberrichter and first Mayor.

== Early life ==
Franc Pust was born on August 13, 1814, at the Kobac farm in Trbovlje to Franc Sr. and Marija (née Kramar). His parents were prosperous farmers.

Franc's education was quite modest as he only attended the local school. He later received some additional education from the local parish priest Franc Grošl.

Franc succeeded his father in managing the farm in 1837.

On February 19, 1838, Franc married Marija Dolinšek. Together, they had two sons, Franc and Feliks. The latter was later the secretary of the mayor Franc Kalan.

Pust was a good friend both with Mihael Roš, with whom he occasionally had a competitive relationship, and with his son, Boštjan. In his memoirs, the latter describes Pust as a calm, thoughtful and conscientious man.

=== Mayorship (1850–1871) ===
Before the formation of the Trbovlje Local Municipality, which was created by the merger of the cadastral municipalities of Trbovlje, Knezdol, Sveti Lenart, Ojstro and Sveti Marko, Pust performed the duties of Trbovlje's oberrichter (superintendent).

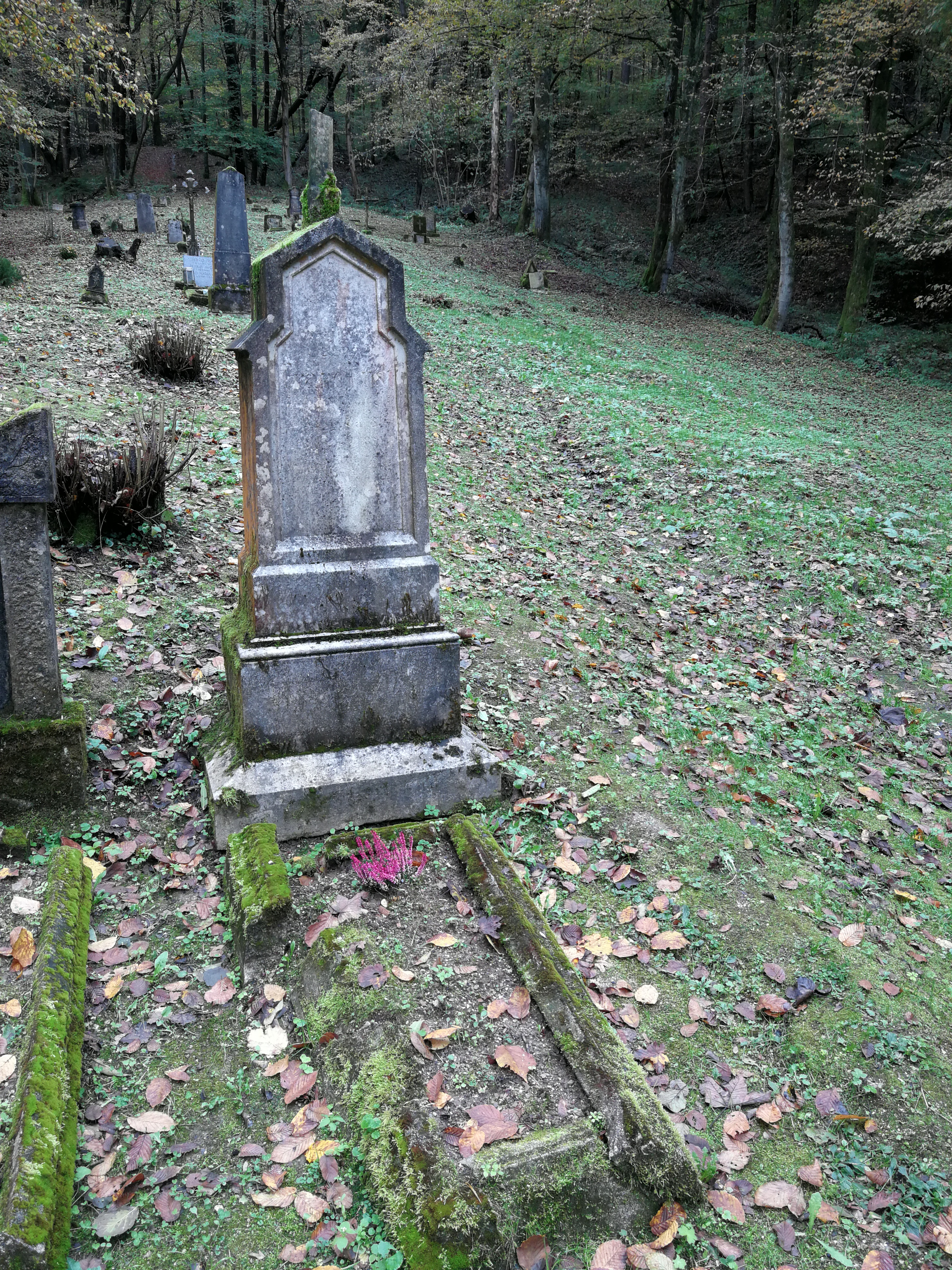
The grave of Franc Pust at the Kobac graveyard (Kobacov britof) in Trbovlje

In 1850, the first mayoral elections were held in Trbovlje, in which Pust won. In addition to the mayor of Pust, the first municipal committee included Jernej Čamer – Parašuh, Matevž Kosem, Franc Kramer, Janez Zadobovšek, Janez Šimonc, Anton Selevšek, Anton Dolinšek – Zaostenkar and parish priest Jožef Hašnik, who resigned at the committee meeting on December 21, 1851.

The next board elections were held on September 17, 1864, although they should have taken place in 1854. In addition to Pust, Anton Plavšak, Ivan Šimonc, Mihael Roš, Martin Špiler and Martin Papež were elected as board members, while Jurij Kralj, Ivan Vautiker, Ivan Zadobovšek, Matevž Polak, Ivan Cajhen and Jurij Plaznik were elected as their deputies. At the first meeting of the new committee on October 3, a new mayor was elected from the presidium, again Pust.

==== Important events during the mayoralty ====
In 1850, the gendarmerie was established. The gendarmes came from Laško and Zidani Most. During their stop in Trbovlje, Pust, as mayor, had the task of providing them with a room and food.

The population of the municipality experienced rapid growth. It grew from 1540 inhabitants in 1825 to 1966 inhabitants in 1851.

In 1867, Trbovlje got its first permanent doctor, Florijan Frohlich, and three years later its own gendarmerie.

Jožef Hašnik, who served as parish priest during Pust's mayoralty, saw that the children of Trbovlje needed school education. He convinced Pust that the municipality renovated and extended the building in the immediate vicinity of the parish church of St. Martin. The construction work was completed in 1862. This gave the school a permanent teacher. The elementary school operated in this building until 1901, when a new building was built, today's Ivan Cankar Elementary School.

== Death ==
In the later years of his life, Pust suffered from mental illness and died by suicide on March 9, 1871. He was 56 years old.

== Sources ==
- Roš, Boštjan (1939). Moji mladostni spomini. Ljubljana: Etnografsko društvo.
- Ivančič Lebar, Irena (2009). Župani naših Trbovelj. Trbovlje: Zasavski muzej. ISBN 978-961-6640-10-7.
