= Matica, Trbovlje =

Matica
- Location in Slovenia
- Coordinates: 46°6′33″N 15°5′5″E
- Country: Slovenia
- Traditional region: Lower Carniola
- Statistical region: Central Sava
- Municipality: Trbovlje
- Elevation: 661 m (2,169 ft)

Matica (Slovene pronunciation: [ˈmaːtitsa]) is a former settlement in the Municipality of Trbovlje in central Slovenia. It is now part of the village of Župa. The area is part of the traditional region of Lower Carniola. It is now included with the rest of the municipality in the Central Sava Statistical Region.

== Geography ==
Matica lies in the northern part of Župa, below the southeast slope of Kožlak Hill (elevation: 669 meters or 2,195 feet).

== History ==
Matica had a population of 79 living in 12 houses in 1880, and 88 living in 12 houses in 1900. Together with part of neighboring Ključevica, Matica was merged into the newly created settlement of Župa in 1955, ending its existence as an independent settlement.
