= Sava Hills =

Hills in Slovenia

Coordinates: 46°5′16.28″N 15°4′22.72″E

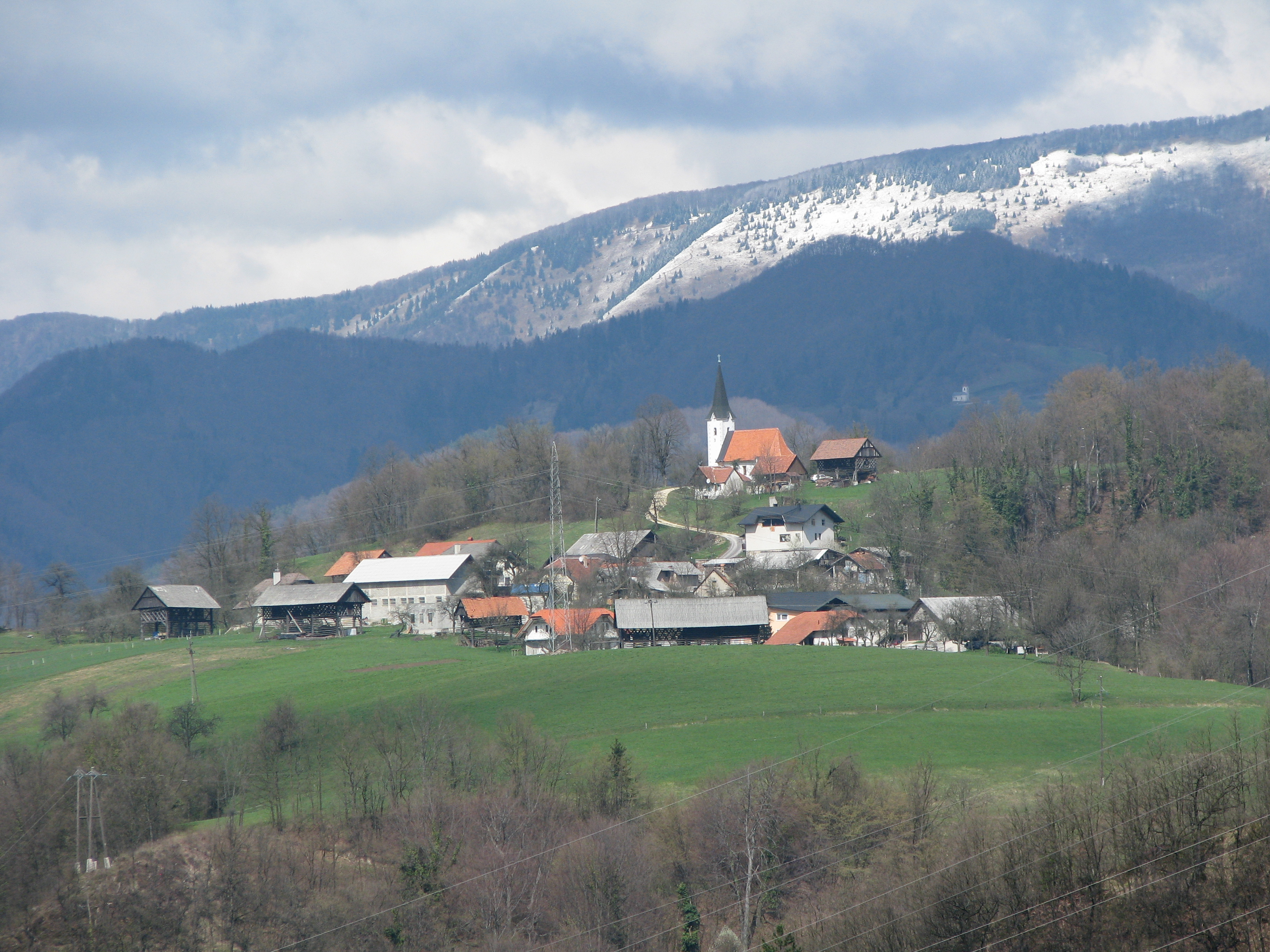
Retje nad Trbovljami, a village in the central part of the Sava Hills, with Čemšenik Pasture in the background

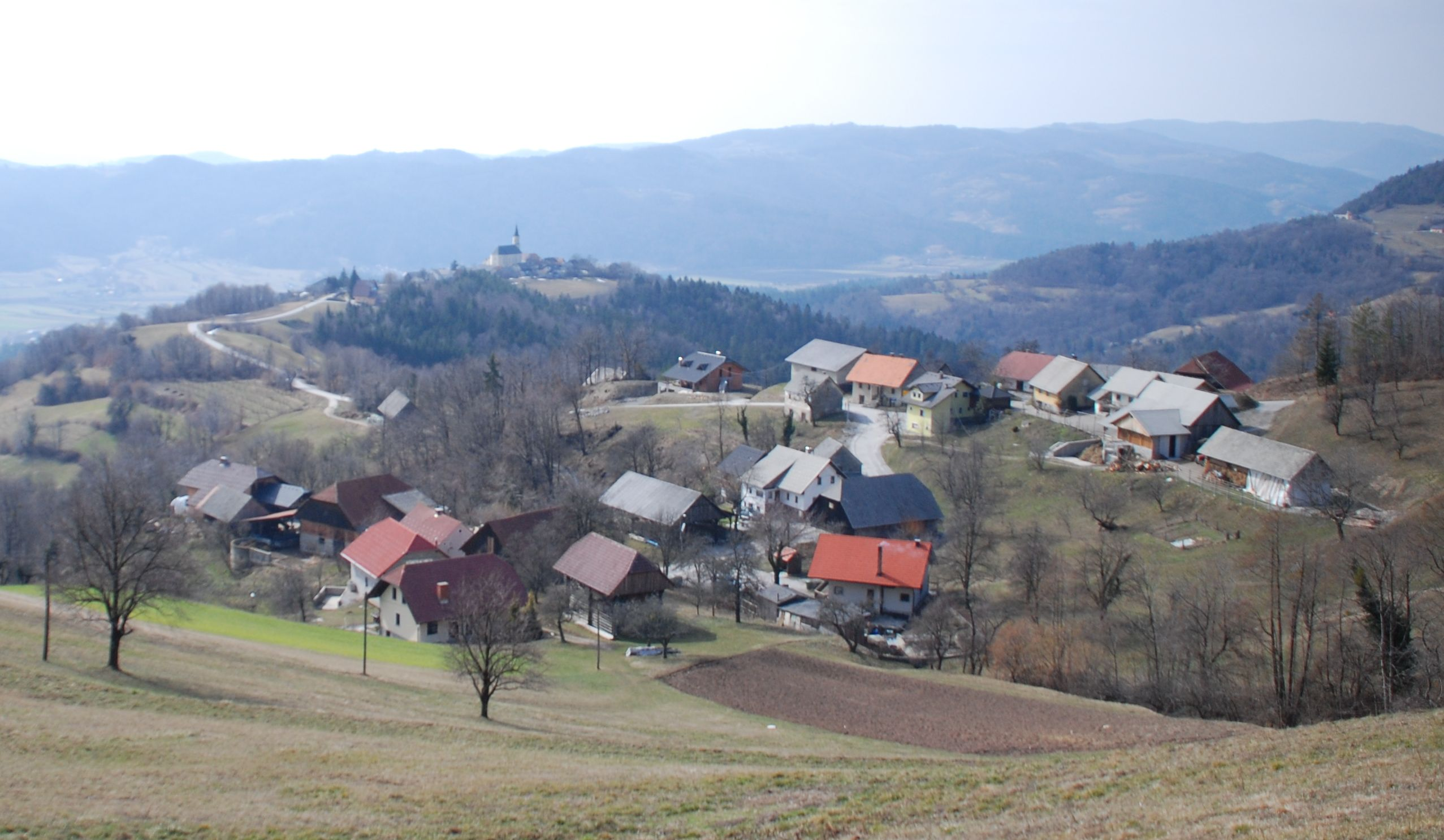
Razbor, a village in the eastern part of the Sava Hills below Mt. Lisca

The Sava Hills (Slovene: Posavsko hribovje) are the eastern part of the Slovene Prealps. They are oriented in the east-west direction and are located to the north and south of the Sava River in central and eastern Slovenia, among the Ljubljana Basin to the west, the Celje Basin to the north, the Lower Carniola valley system and the Krško Basin to the south, and the Sotla Hills to the east. They cover an area of 1,909 square kilometres (737 sq mi) and are the largest Slovenian mesoregion.

The region has an average elevation of only 484 metres (1,588 ft), and an average inclination of 16.6°. It is water-rich, because the ground contains copious impermeable rocks, particularly sandstone and conglomerate at lower elevations, whereas at higher elevations, it mainly consists of limestone and dolomite. Predominantly deciduous forest covers almost two thirds of the area. The Sava flows through its central part from the west to the east. Notable rises along it are Kum (1,220 m or 4,000 ft) to the south of the Sava, Mount Čemšenik (1,204 m or 3,950 ft), Javor (1,133 m or 3,717 ft), and Mrzlica (1,122 m or 3,681 ft) to the north of the Sava and to the west of the Savinja River, and Bohor (1,023 m or 3,356 ft) and Lisca (948 m or 3,110 ft) to the north of the Sava and the east of the Savinja. The Savinja flows through the hills transversely from the Celje Basin and joins the Sava at Zidani Most.

About 135,000 people live in the Sava Hills. The settlements Litija in the Litija Basin and Trbovlje, Zagorje ob Savi, and Hrastnik in the narrow Central Sava Valley are known by their mining and timber rafting past and the energetics industry. The town of Radeče at the beginning of the wider Lower Sava Valley is known after paper industry. Other economic activities in the region are services, forestry, and livestock production. A railroad links places along the Sava and another one links places along the Savinja, both joining at Zidani Most. Since 2005, a highway crosses the northern Sava Hills and connects the Ljubljana Basin and the Celje Basin through the Trojane Tunnel. A historically important old road crosses them over the Trojane Pass (585 m or 1,919 ft).
