= Loke, Trbovlje =

Loke
- Location in Slovenia
- Coordinates: 46°9′19″N 15°2′58″E
- Country: Slovenia
- Traditional region: Styria
- Statistical region: Central Sava
- Municipality: Trbovlje
- Elevation: 302 m (991 ft)

Loke (Slovene pronunciation: [ˈloːkɛ]) is a former settlement in the Municipality of Trbovlje in central Slovenia. It is now part of the town of Trbovlje. The area is part of the traditional region of Styria. It is now included with the rest of the municipality in the Central Sava Statistical Region.

== Geography ==
Loke lies in the northern part of Trbovlje, below the southeast slope of Klek Hill (elevation: 511 meters or 1,677 feet).

== History ==
Loke had a population of 4,781 in 1900. Loke was annexed by Trbovlje in 1953, ending its existence as an independent settlement.

== Notable people ==
Notable people that were born or lived in Loke include the following:

- Anton Mervar (1885–1942), button accordion manufacturer
