= Central Sava Valley =

Valley region of central Slovenia

Coordinates: 46°4′47.64″N 15°0′26.37″E

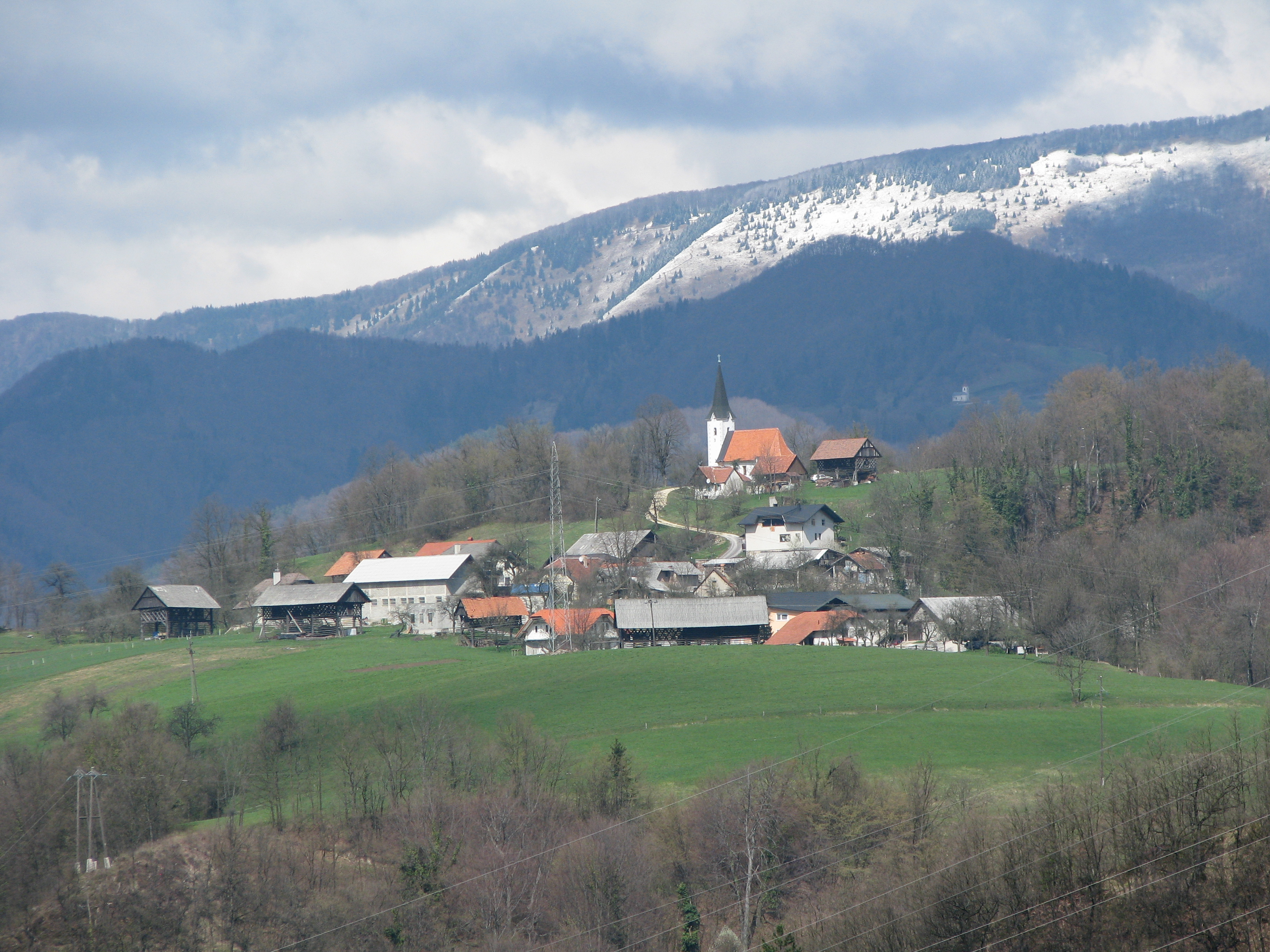
Retje near Trbovlje

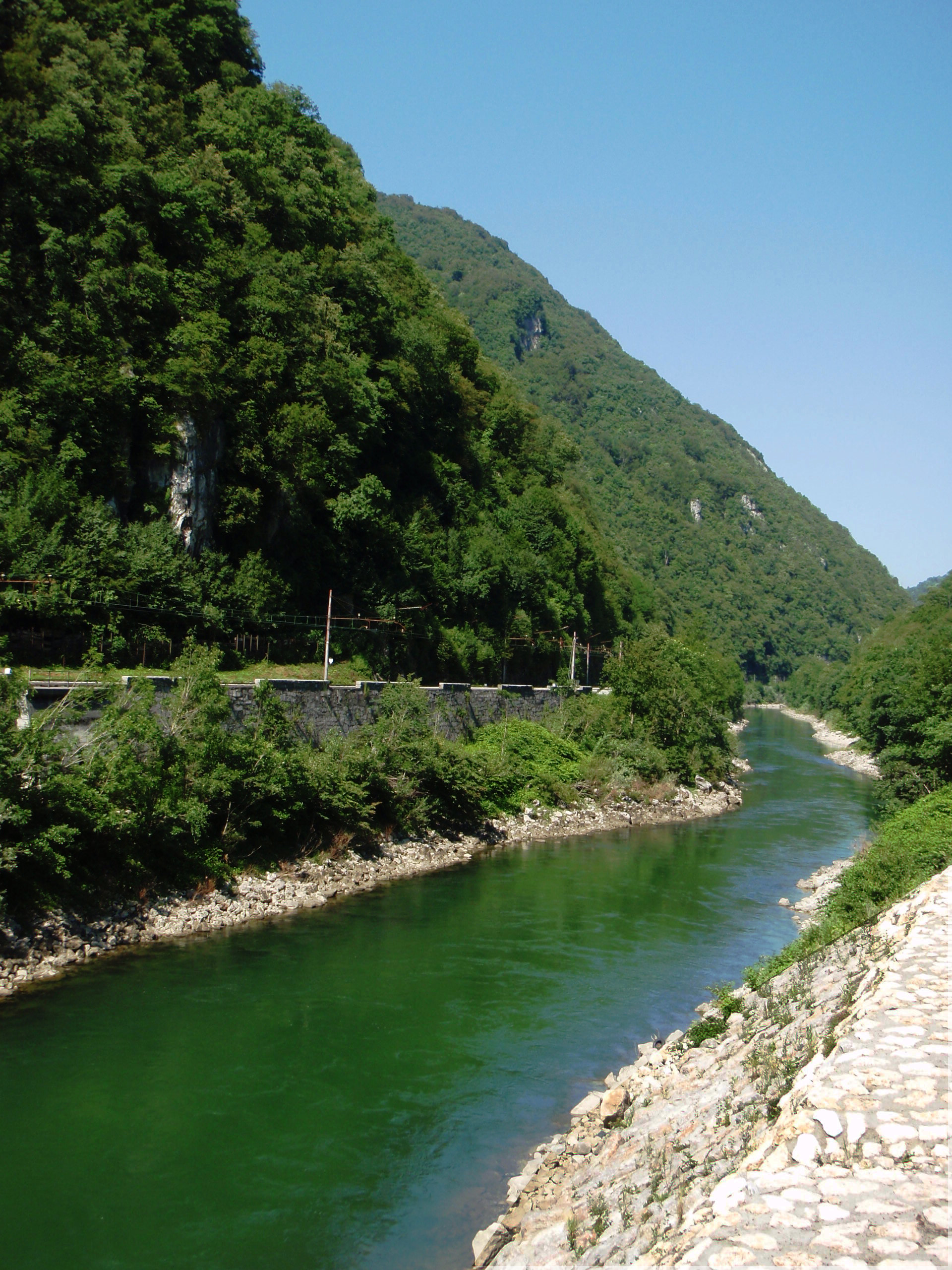
The Central Sava Valley with the Sava River and plains

The Central Sava Valley (Slovene: Zasavje) is a valley in the Sava Hills and a geographic region along the Sava in central Slovenia, now constituting the Central Sava Statistical Region. The region consists of three municipalities: Zagorje ob Savi, Trbovlje, and Hrastnik. Several coal mines operated in the Central Sava Valley, although all except the Trbovlje–Hrastnik Mine are now defunct. It is surrounded by the Sava Hills, with Kum (1,220 metres or 4,000 feet) on the right side of the Sava and Black Peak (1,204 metres or 3,950 feet) on Čemšenik Pasture at the left side of the Sava, as its highest peaks.

== History ==
The Slovene term Zasavje for this area (Note: There is also a low-lying agricultural area known as Zasavje (literally, 'behind the Sava River') in the Lower Sava Valley between Krška Vas and the Sava River.) is a recent coinage that did not come into general use until the 1920s, with the western part of the region being part of Carniola (Slovene: Kranjska) and its eastern part (Trbovlje and Hrastnik) belonging to Styria (Slovene: Štajerska). Due to its coalmining tradition, it was one of the first regions in today's Slovenia to be industrialized in the 19th century. Construction of the Austrian Southern Railway, which led from Vienna to Trieste through Slovenia and the Central Sava Valley in 1849, was a major milestone.
