= Klek =

Klek may refer to:

- Klek, Zrenjanin, a village in Serbia
- Klek, Croatia, a village in southern Croatia
- Klek, Istočno Novo Sarajevo, a village in Bosnia and Herzegovina
- Klek, Prozor, a village in Bosnia and Herzegovina
- Klek mountain, Croatia
- Klek (peninsula), a peninsula near Neum, Bosnia and Herzegovina
- Klek (Karawanks), a peak in the Karawanks in Slovenia
- Klek, Trbovlje, a village in the Municipality of Trbovlje, central Slovenia
- Klęk, a village in Poland

== People ==
- Hanna Marie Klek (born 1995), German chess grandmaster
