= Partizanski vrh =

Partizanski vrh may refer to:

- Jelovica, a karst plateau in northwestern Slovenia with a prominence called Partizanski vrh
- Sveta Planina, a settlement in the Municipality of Trbovlje, known as Partizanski vrh from 1955 to 2002
