= Čebine =

- Location in Slovenia
- Coordinates: 46°10′10.89″N 15°0′8.39″E
- Country: Slovenia
- Traditional region: Styria
- Statistical region: Central Sava
- Municipality: Trbovlje

Area
  - Total: 1.46 km^{2} (0.56 sq mi)
- Elevation: 665.3 m (2,183 ft)

Population (2002)
  - Total: 24
- Postal code: 1420

Čebine (pronounced [tʃɛˈbiːnɛ]) is a settlement in the Municipality of Trbovlje in central Slovenia. It lies in the hills west of the town of Trbovlje. The area is part of the traditional region of Styria. It is now included with the rest of the municipality in the Central Sava Statistical Region.

== Name ==
Čebine was attested in historical sources as Heyliges Crewtz in 1498 and heiliges Kreuz in 1535, based on the name of the local church.

== History ==
The Communist Party of Slovenia was established in the night from 17 to 18 April 1937 at the Barlič farm in Čebine.

== Church ==
The local church is dedicated to the Holy Cross and belongs to the Parish of Sveta Planina. It has a medieval core, but it was extensively rebuilt in the 18th century.
