= Završje, Trbovlje =

Završje
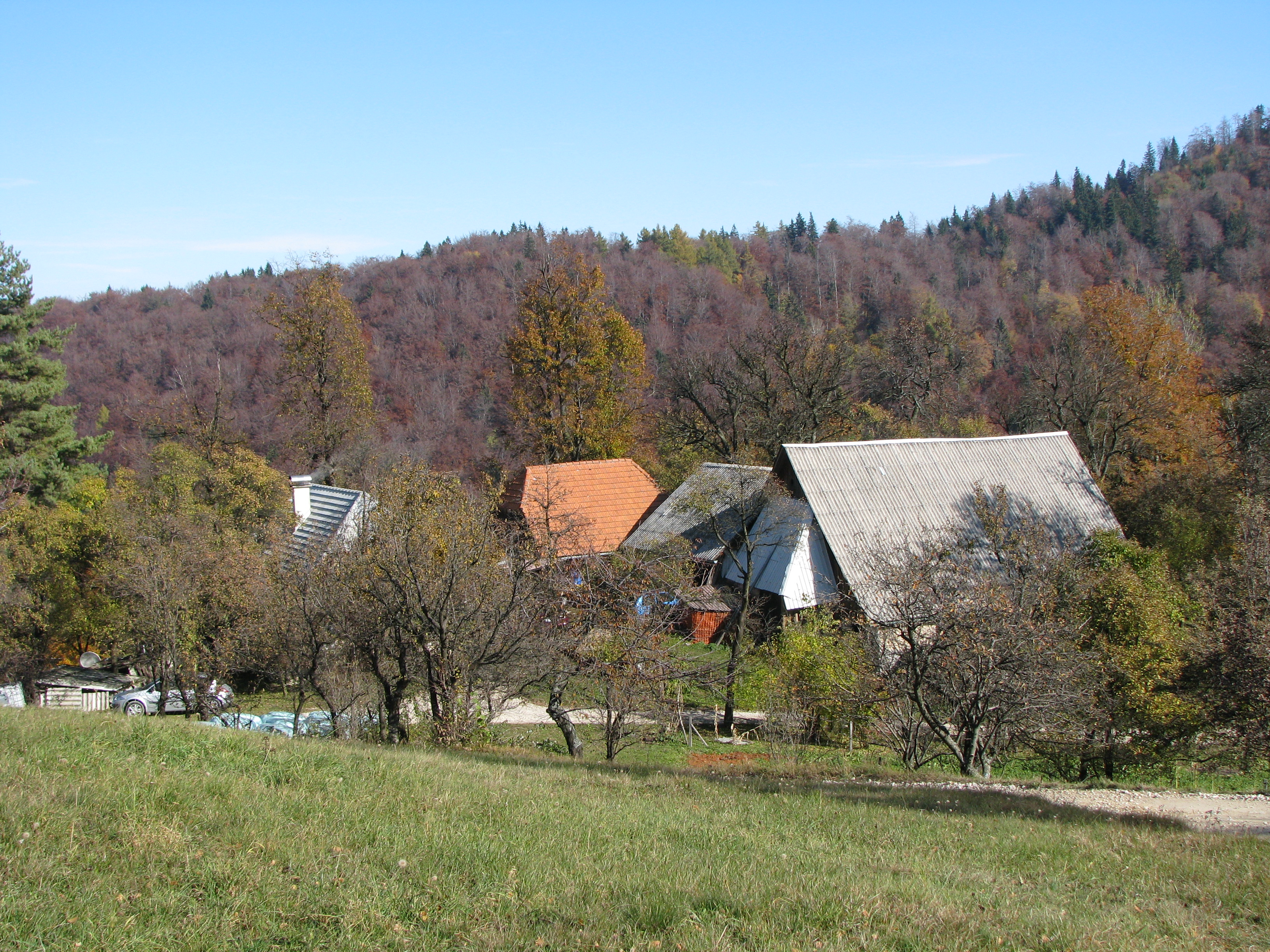

- Location in Slovenia
- Coordinates: 46°6′22.84″N 15°1′33.41″E
- Country: Slovenia
- Traditional region: Lower Carniola
- Statistical region: Central Sava
- Municipality: Trbovlje

Area
  - Total: 6.18 km^{2} (2.39 sq mi)
- Elevation: 708.3 m (2,324 ft)

Population (2002)
  - Total: 51
- Postal code: 1423

Završje (pronounced [ˈzaːʋəɾʃjɛ]) is a dispersed settlement in the Municipality of Trbovlje in central Slovenia. It lies in the hills south of the right bank of the Sava River. The area is part of the traditional region of Lower Carniola. It is now included with the rest of the municipality in the Central Sava Statistical Region.

The local church is dedicated to Saint Michael and belongs to the Parish of Dobovec. It dates to the 17th century.
