= Kleks =

Kleks may refer to:

- A fictional character Pan Kleks
- A fictional character from comics about Jonka, Jonek and Kleks
- Autosan H9-21.41S Kleks, Polish school bus
- Marcia Rachel Kleks, birth name of Marcia Clark (born 1953), American prosecutor, author, television correspondent, and television producer

== See also ==
- Klek (disambiguation)
