= Škofja Riža =

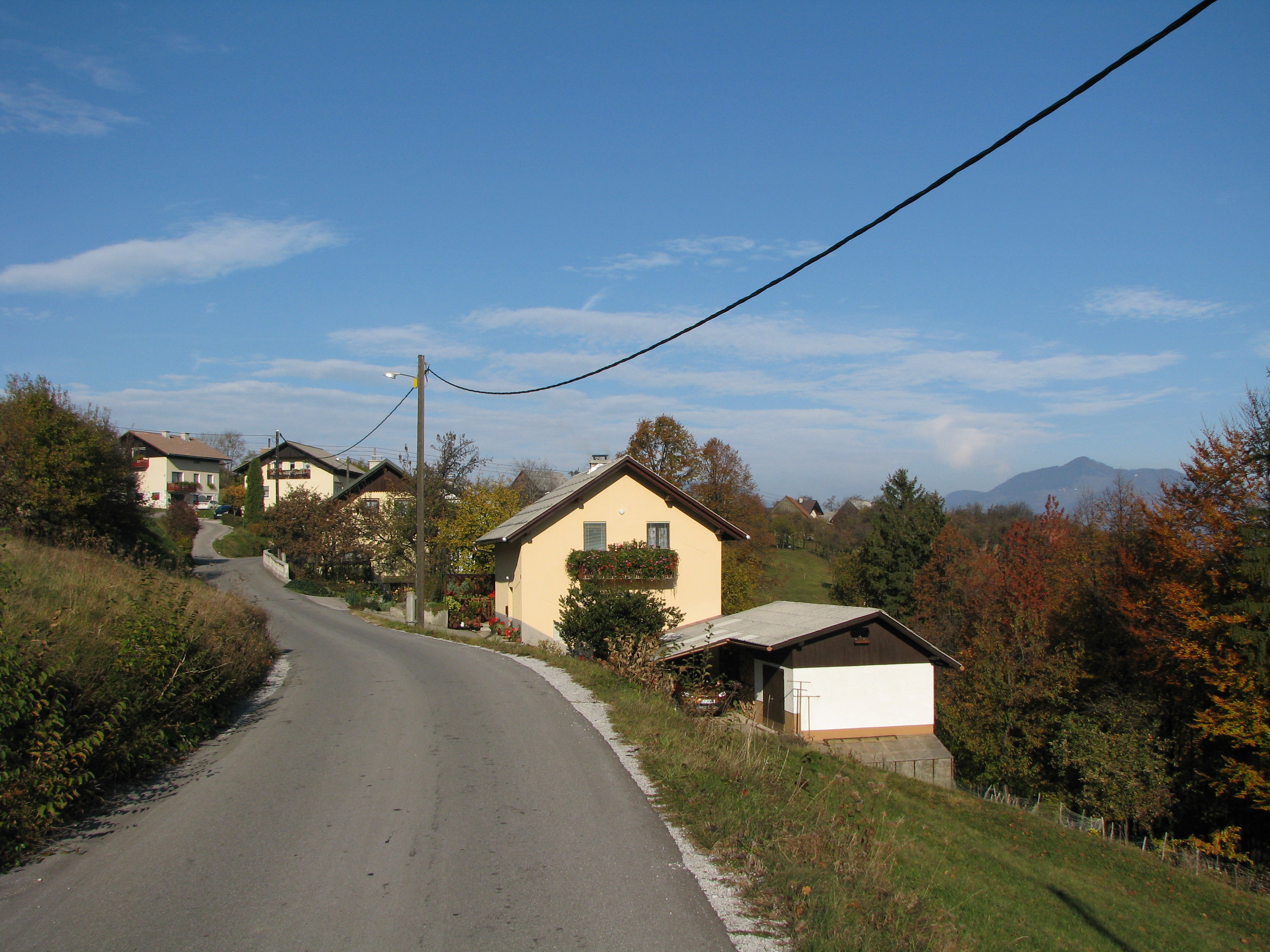

- Location in Slovenia
- Coordinates: 46°7′7.84″N 15°2′42.55″E
- Country: Slovenia
- Traditional region: Lower Carniola
- Statistical region: Central Sava
- Municipality: Trbovlje

Area
  - Total: 2.64 km^{2} (1.02 sq mi)
- Elevation: 636.8 m (2,089 ft)

Population (2002)
  - Total: 126
- Postal code: 1423

Škofja Riža (pronounced [ˈʃkoːfja ˈɾiːʒa]) is a settlement in the Municipality of Trbovlje in central Slovenia. It lies in the hills south of the right bank of the Sava River, east of Dobovec. It is now included with the rest of the municipality in the Central Sava Statistical Region.
