= Klek, Trbovlje =

Klek
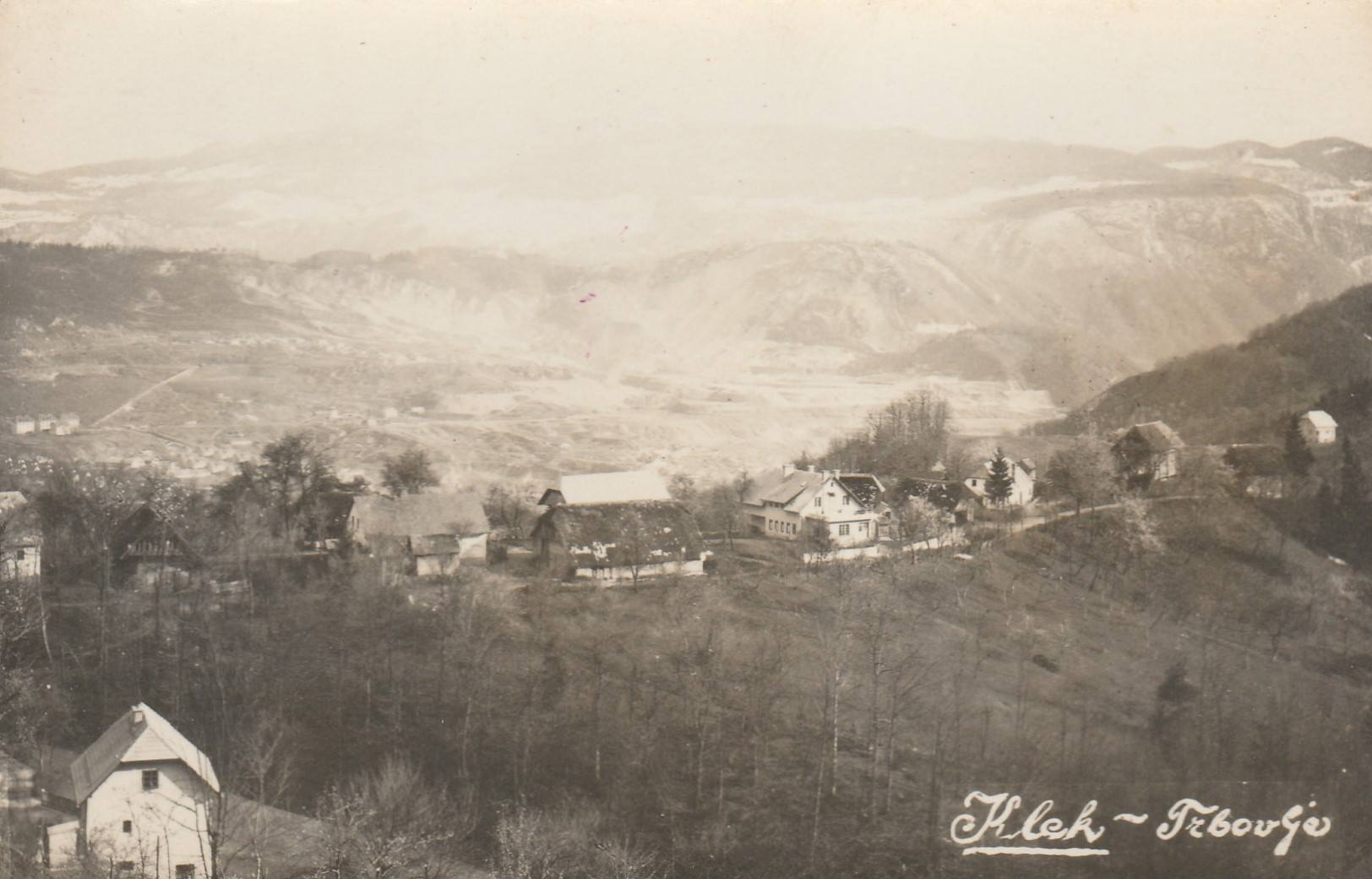
- 1939 postcard of Klek

- Location in Slovenia
- Coordinates: 46°9′37.76″N 15°2′17.99″E
- Country: Slovenia
- Traditional region: Styria
- Statistical region: Central Sava
- Municipality: Trbovlje
- Postal code: 1423

Klek (pronounced [ˈkleːk]) is a settlement in the Municipality of Trbovlje in central Slovenia. It was established in 2014. It is included with the rest of the municipality in the Central Sava Statistical Region.

== History ==
Klek was administratively separated from Prapreče and Trbovlje in 2013 and made a settlement in its own right.

== Church ==
The local church is dedicated to the Holy Cross and belongs to the Parish of Trbovlje–St. Martin, part of the Diocese of Celje.
