= Anton Mervar =

- Born: 20 March 1885; Loke, Austria-Hungary
- Died: 21 July 1942 (aged 57); Near Miltonvale, Kansas, United States
- Occupation: Button accordion manufacturer

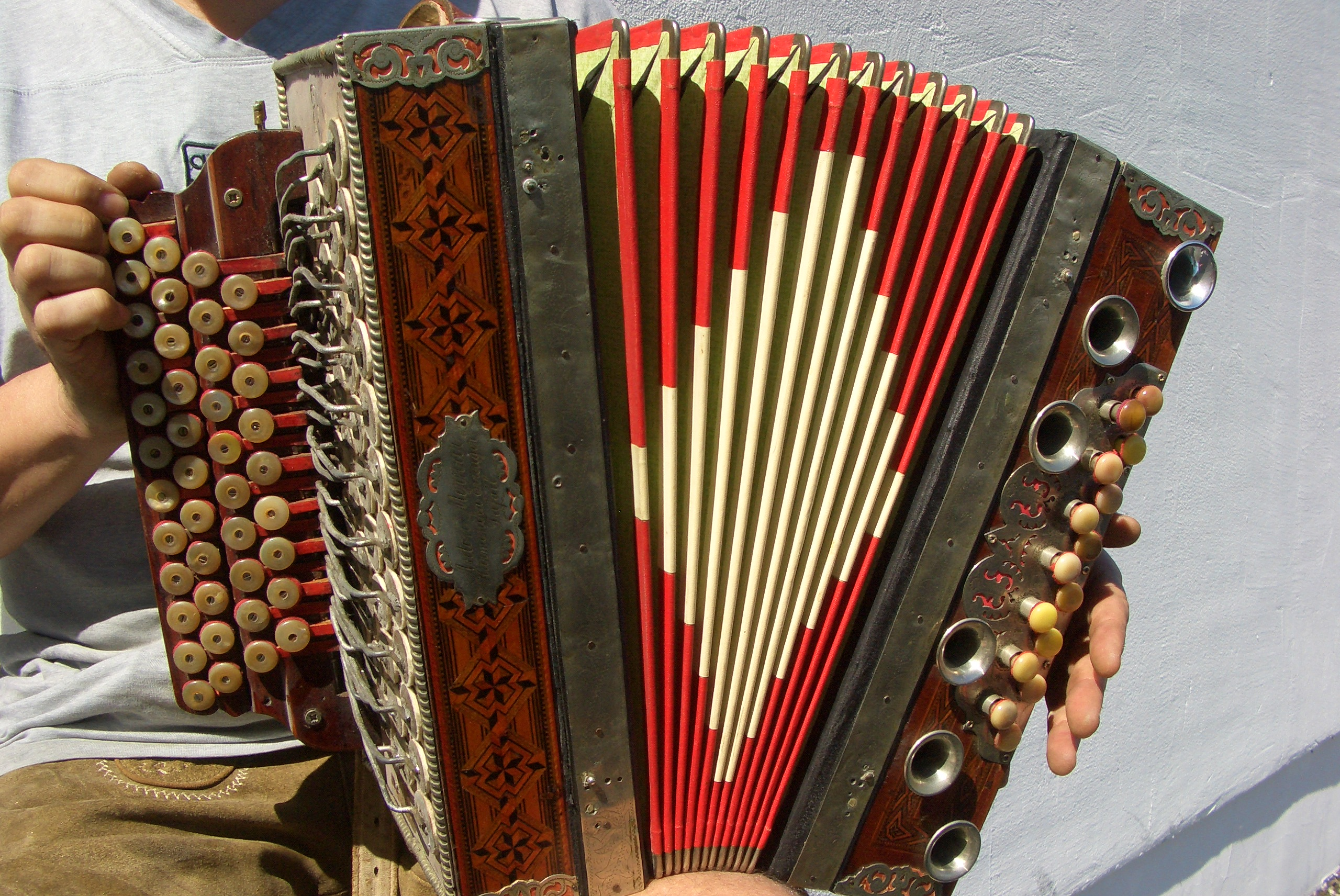
Mervar's button accordion, built 1905 in Trbovlje

Anton Mervar (20 March 1885 – 21 July 1942) was a manufacturer of Slovenian button accordions.

Mervar was born in Loke, now part of the town of Trbovlje. he began working with his father Anton Sr. in his father's shop in their hometown of Trifail, in the Austrian province of Carniola (now Trbovlje, Slovenia). His father had learned on his own to repair Slovenian diatonic accordions, and he eventually began to produce them himself in his workshop.

After a stint serving in the Austro-Hungarian army, Anton Jr. went to work as an apprentice in the accordion factory of Franc Lubas. He completed his apprenticeship at the Lubas firm in Slovenia (then Austria) in 1912, after which he moved with his wife Francka and young son Tony to the United States, settling in Cleveland, Ohio In 1915, he began making accordions in his home workshop. In 1921 he opened his own factory on St. Clair Avenue in Cleveland. Every second year he traveled to Europe to get parts for his accordions.

Mervar and his wife Francka died in a car accident on 21 July 1942 near the Clay–Cloud county line in Kansas. Shortly thereafter, their son Tony died from hypoglycemia, and Mervar's daughter Justine Mervar Reber, who inherited the factory, sold most of the unfinished accordion parts and machinery to Grossman Music. Justine continued to operate a record store, Mervar Music, out of her father's old factory with her husband Hans Reber until the late 1980s.

Mervar's accordions set a standard for accordion craftsmanship. His instruments are prized by accordionists and collectors for their distinctive tone.
