= Ojstro, Trbovlje =

Ojstro
- Location in Slovenia
- Coordinates: 46°9′14.14″N 15°3′47.91″E
- Country: Slovenia
- Traditional region: Styria
- Statistical region: Central Sava
- Municipality: Trbovlje

Area
  - Total: 1.45 km^{2} (0.56 sq mi)
- Elevation: 395.6 m (1,298 ft)

Population (2002)
  - Total: 159
- Postal code: 1420

Ojstro (pronounced [ˈoːi̯stɾɔ]) is a settlement in the hills immediately east of the town of Trbovlje in central Slovenia. The area is part of the traditional region of Styria. It is now included with the rest of the Municipality of Trbovlje in the Central Sava Statistical Region.
