= Gabrsko =

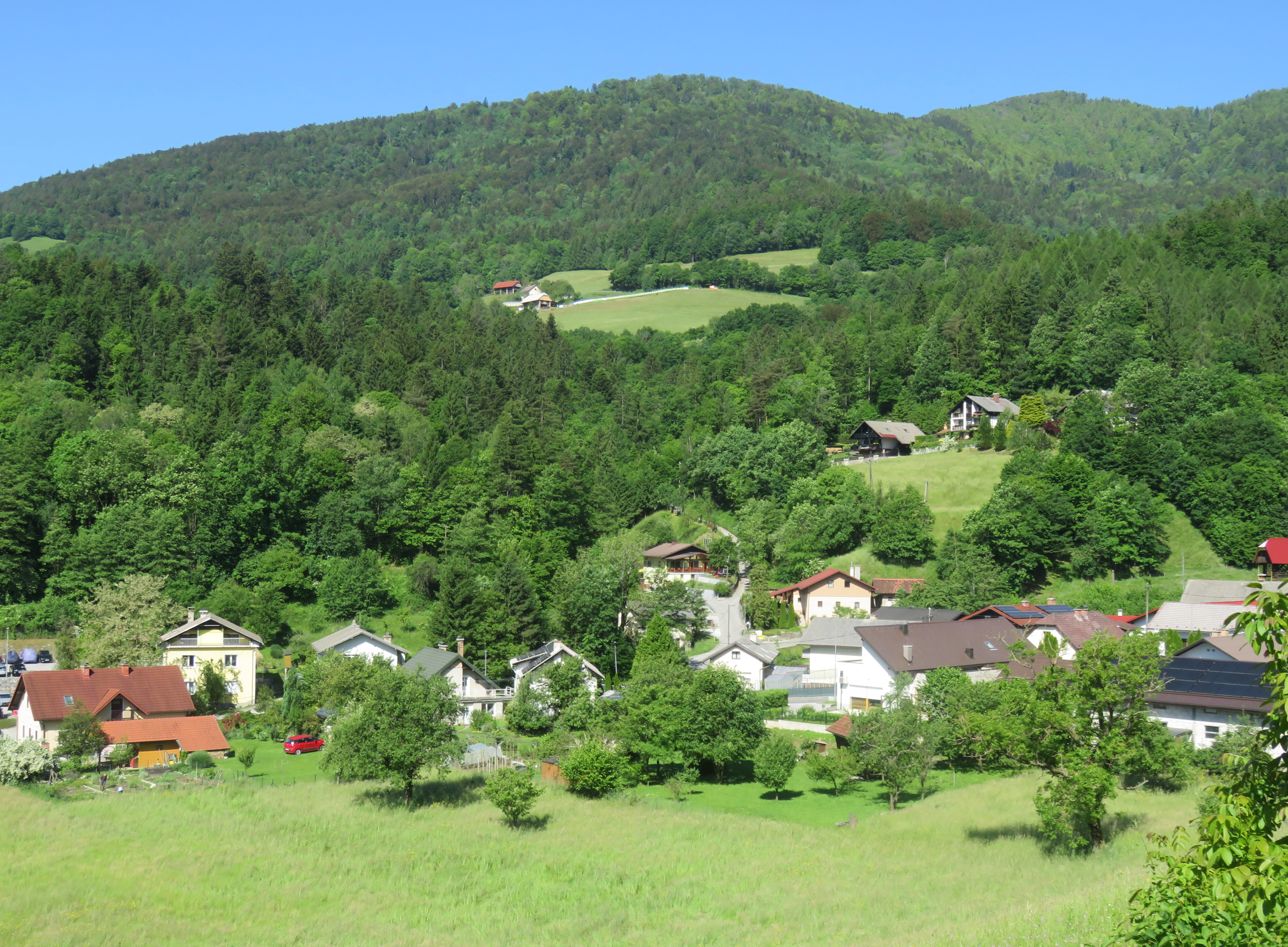

- Location in Slovenia
- Coordinates: 46°10′29.64″N 15°2′52.52″E
- Country: Slovenia
- Traditional region: Styria
- Statistical region: Central Sava
- Municipality: Trbovlje

Area
  - Total: 2.13 km^{2} (0.82 sq mi)
- Elevation: 360.6 m (1,183 ft)

Population (2002)
  - Total: 375
- Postal code: 1420

Gabrsko (pronounced [ˈɡaːbəɾskɔ]) is a settlement in the Municipality of Trbovlje in central Slovenia. It lies immediately north of the town of Trbovlje. The area is part of the traditional region of Styria. It is now included with the rest of the municipality in the Central Sava Statistical Region.

== Notable people ==
Notable people that were born or lived in Gabrsko include:

- Miha Marinko (1900–1983), communist politician
