= Knezdol =

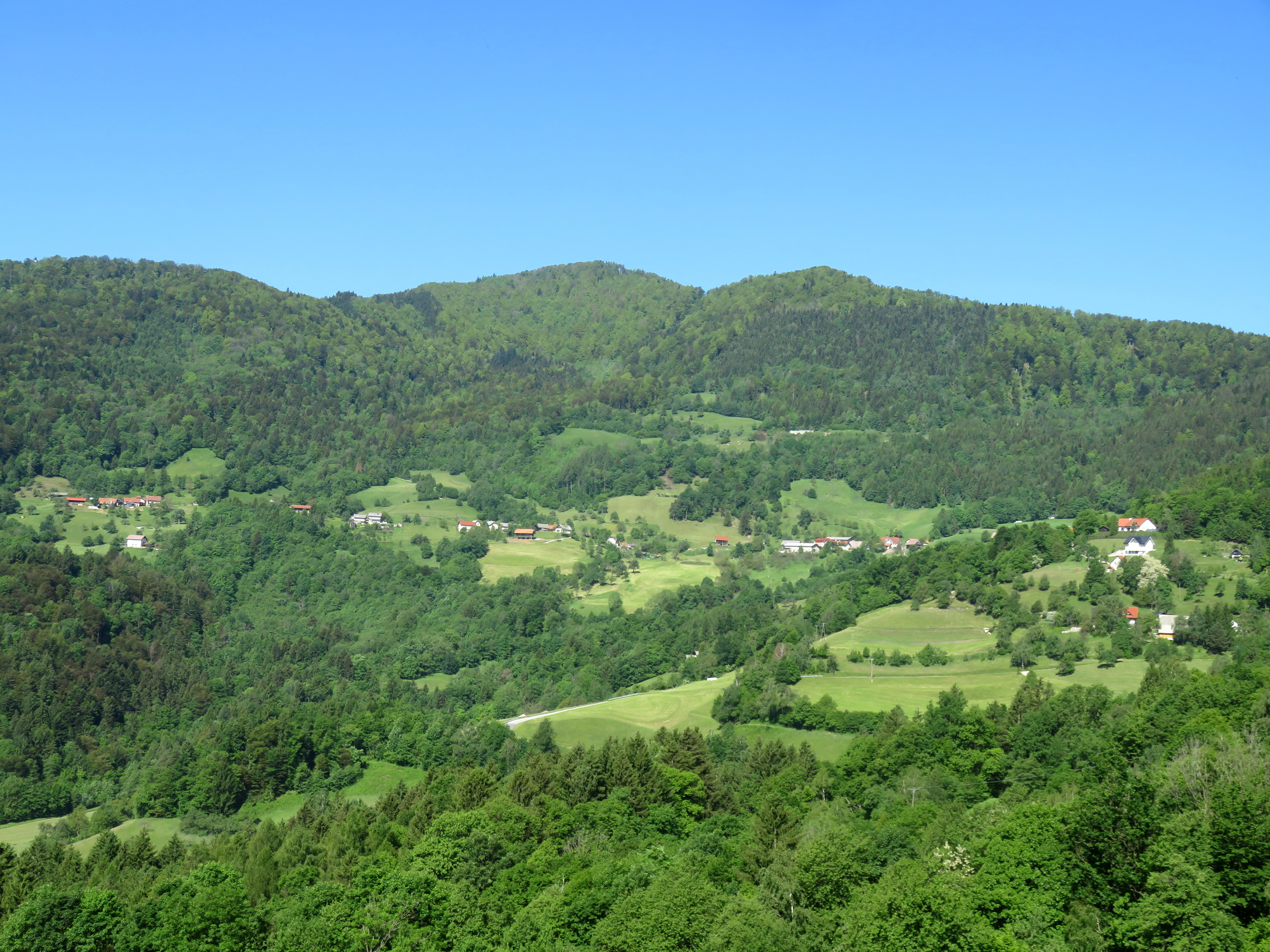

- Location in Slovenia
- Coordinates: 46°11′6.87″N 15°3′15.4″E
- Country: Slovenia
- Traditional region: Styria
- Statistical region: Central Sava
- Municipality: Trbovlje

Area
  - Total: 5.57 km^{2} (2.15 sq mi)
- Elevation: 658.9 m (2,162 ft)

Population (2012)
  - Total: 256
  - Density: 46/km^{2} (120/sq mi)
- Postal code: 1420

Knezdol (pronounced [ˈkneːzdɔl]) is a settlement in the Municipality of Trbovlje in central Slovenia. It is made up of clusters of settlement and isolated farmsteads dispersed though the hills north of the town of Trbovlje. The area is part of the traditional region of Styria. It is now included with the rest of the municipality in the Central Sava Statistical Region.

== Name ==
Knezdol was first attested in written sources in 1265–67 as in Gravenstůl. The Slovene name is a compound of knez 'duke' and dol 'valley', a calque from the German compound grave 'count' + stuol 'seat'. The name indicates that the area was the property of a count or duke.

== Mass grave ==
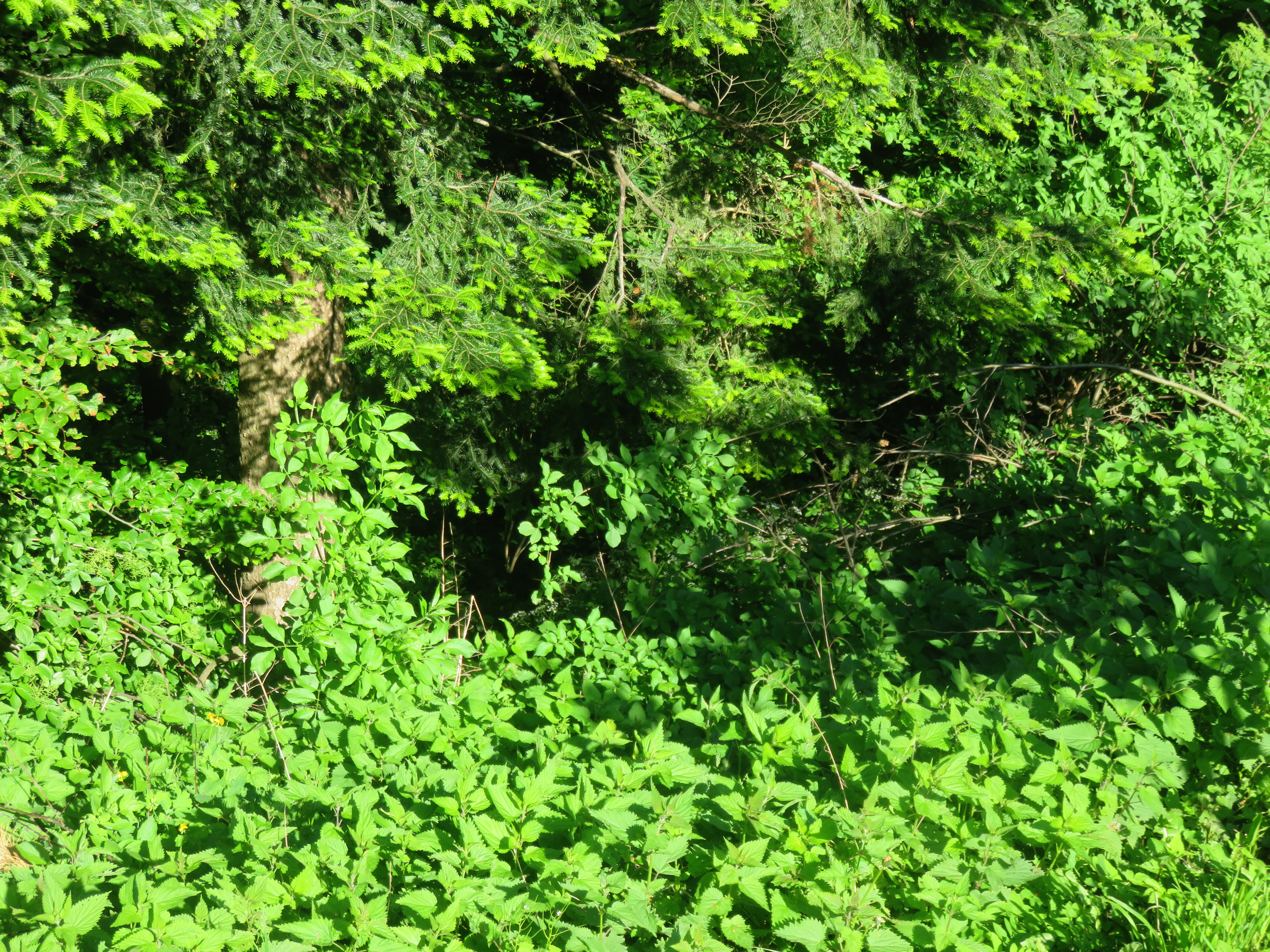
Hunting Lodge Mass Grave

Knezdol is the site of a mass grave from the period immediately after the Second World War. The Hunting Lodge Mass Grave (Slovene: Grobišče za Lovsko kočo) is located about 30 meters (98 ft) west of a hunting lodge in a spruce forest. Human remains were found during excavations in 1980 for a dining room at the lodge. The remains are believed to be those of victims brought to the site from Trbovlje and Hrastnik, and murdered in May and June 1945.
