= Planinska Vas, Trbovlje =

Planinska Vas
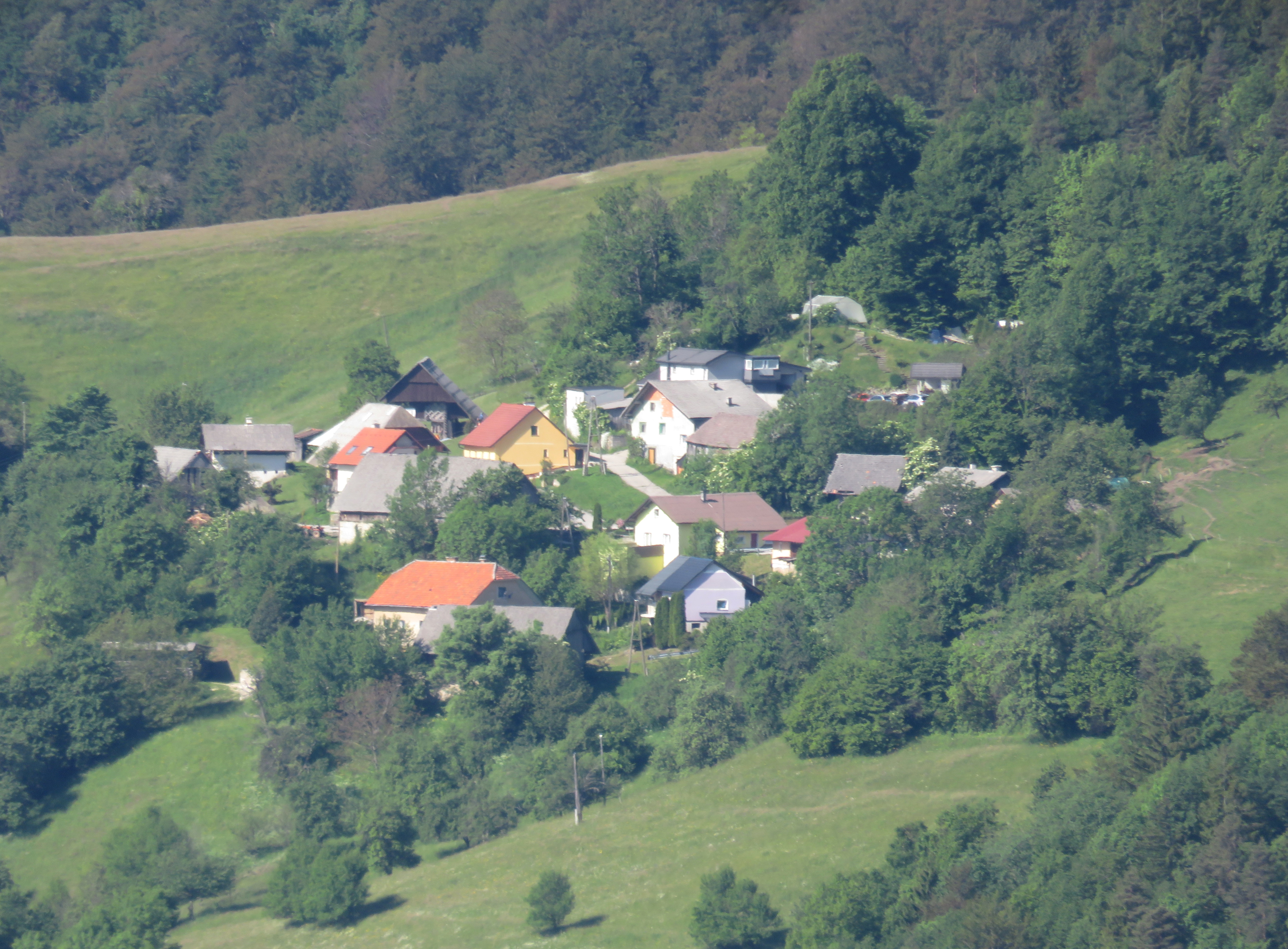

- Location in Slovenia
- Coordinates: 46°10′9.25″N 15°1′52.36″E
- Country: Slovenia
- Traditional region: Styria
- Statistical region: Central Sava
- Municipality: Trbovlje

Area
  - Total: 1.53 km^{2} (0.59 sq mi)
- Elevation: 619 m (2,031 ft)

Population (2002)
  - Total: 62
- Postal code: 1420

Planinska Vas (pronounced [plaˈniːnska ˈʋaːs]; Slovene: Planinska vas) is a settlement in the Municipality of Trbovlje in central Slovenia. It lies in the hills northwest of the town of Trbovlje. The area is part of the traditional region of Styria. It is now included with the rest of the municipality in the Central Sava Statistical Region.
