= Župa, Trbovlje =

Župa
- Location in Slovenia
- Coordinates: 46°6′12.37″N 15°5′13.38″E
- Country: Slovenia
- Traditional region: Lower Carniola
- Statistical region: Central Sava
- Municipality: Trbovlje

Area
  - Total: 2.29 km^{2} (0.88 sq mi)
- Elevation: 759.9 m (2,493 ft)

Population (2002)
  - Total: 113
- Postal code: 1423

Župa (pronounced [ˈʒuːpa]) is a settlement in the Municipality of Trbovlje in central Slovenia. It lies in the hills above the right bank of the Sava River east of Dobovec. The area is part of the traditional region of Lower Carniola. It is now included with the rest of the municipality in the Central Sava Statistical Region.
