= Ključevica =

- Location in Slovenia
- Coordinates: 46°04′59″N 15°05′09″E
- Country: Slovenia
- Traditional region: Lower Carniola
- Statistical region: Central Sava
- Municipality: Trbovlje

Area
  - Total: 5.04 km^{2} (1.95 sq mi)
- Elevation: 1,009.8 m (3,313 ft)

Population (2002)
  - Total: 25
- Postal code: 1423

Ključevica (pronounced [kljuˈtʃeːʋitsa]) is a dispersed settlement in the Municipality of Trbovlje in central Slovenia. It lies on the northern and eastern slopes of Mount Kum. The area is part of the traditional region of Lower Carniola. It is now included with the rest of the municipality in the Central Sava Statistical Region.

There are two churches in the area. Both belong to the Parish of Dobovec. The church on the top of Mount Kum is dedicated to Saint Agnes and dates to the 17th century. Lower down the mountain to the east is the second church, dedicated to the Virgin Mary. It is a medieval church that was rebuilt in the late 19th century.
