= Prapreče, Trbovlje =

Prapreče
- Location in Slovenia
- Coordinates: 46°8′59.62″N 15°1′33.67″E
- Country: Slovenia
- Traditional region: Styria
- Statistical region: Central Sava
- Municipality: Trbovlje

Area
  - Total: 2.03 km^{2} (0.78 sq mi)
- Elevation: 411.5 m (1,350 ft)

Population (2002)
  - Total: 147
- Postal code: 1410

Prapreče (pronounced [ˈpɾaːpɾɛtʃɛ]) is a settlement in the Municipality of Trbovlje in central Slovenia. A small part of the settlement also lies in the neighbouring Municipality of Zagorje ob Savi. The area is part of the traditional region of Styria. It is now included with the rest of the municipality in the Central Sava Statistical Region.

The local church is dedicated to Saint Agnes (Slovene: sveta Neža) and belongs to the Parish of Zagorje ob Savi. It was rebuilt in the 19th century on the site of an earlier building.
