= Trbovlje Power Station =

Power station in Slovenia

- Trbovlje Chimney above the Sava Valley
- Location of the Trbovlje Power Station in Slovenia
- Country: Slovenia
- Coordinates: 46°7′33″N 15°3′41″E
- Status: Completed
- Construction began: 1964
- Commission date: 1966
- Decommission date: 2016
- Operator: Termoelektrarna Trbovlje d.o.o.

Thermal power station
- Primary fuel: Lignite
- Secondary fuel: Natural gas

Power generation
- Units operational: 1 X 125 MW; 1 X 63 MW
- Nameplate capacity: 188 MW

External links
- Commons: Related media on Commons

The Trbovlje Power Station (Slovene: Termoelektrarna Trbovlje) was a lignite-fired power station on the bank of the Sava River near Trbovlje, Slovenia. The plant was operated by Termoelektrarna Trbovlje d.o.o.

The original power station was built in 1915. The new power station was built in 1964–1968 and it became operational in 1966. It consisted of two units. The first unit was a 125 MW steam unit. The second unit was a 63 MW gas unit which included two gas generators. It was used as a reserve unit for the Slovenian electric system.

The Trbovlje Chimney (Trboveljski dimnik) of the power station, built in 1976, is the tallest flue-gas stack in Europe. The 360-metre (1,180 ft) high flue-gas stack was poured in 210 days, and required 11,866 cubic metres (419,000 cu ft) of concrete and 1,079 tons of reinforcing steel. A high chimney was required for the site to ensure that emissions were removed from the deep, narrow valley under all weather conditions.

In November 2014 it was announced that the power station would be shut down; the station was closed in 2016 after several years dormant.

In 2020, the climbers Janja Garnbret and Domen Škofic climbed an artificial climbing route created up the 360-metre chimney for the film 360 Ascent. In 2026, a human catapult was installed in the upper 60 metres of the chimney to launch BASE jumpers Dani Román and Fred Fugen to a record-breaking altitude of more than 100 metres above the top of the chimney.

== History ==
=== Construction and operation in 1915 ===
On March 19, 1915, in the second year of the First World War, a newly built power plant along the Sava was opened in Trbovlje. On that day, the new coal-fired thermal power plant along the Sava River started operating, after the first thermal power plant at Vode in Trbovlje ceased to operate due to insufficient capacity, lack of sufficient water, proximity to residential settlements and other circumstances.

On that day, a turbine with a generator with a capacity of 4,000 kW began to produce electricity. The start of operation of this new and large facility with a large capacity was a severe test for the management, especially for the electrical and mechanical staff of the Trbovlje mine. Therefore, the start of operations meant a big day. On the opening day, all engineers, machinists and electricians, as well as other staff of the mine and the new plant of the power plant along the Sava, as it was called all the years until the Second World War, gathered. The large turbogenerator, the switchboard next to the generator, a series of electrical meters, oil switch levers for individual energy consumers (own consumption, mine, cement plant) were especially interesting for all participants in the large hall of the engine room. Before the connection, the steam turbine and the generator were still running empty. At 10 a.m., however, they began weighting experiments on the generator and turbine. For these experiments, a large wooden tub with built-in water resistors was prepared outside the power plant along the north wall. However, none of the domestic experts dared to turn on the turbogenerator oil switch on the switchboard. This work was then performed by the director of the First Machine Factory from Brno, an engineer from Križek, who otherwise participated as a designer in attempts to load machines and devices. When he turned on the switch, everyone looked at each other and breathed a sigh of relief. The turbine and generator withstood the prescribed load. In the first, a large thermal power plant for coal at the time, but small for today's conditions, it was produced with three steam-powered generators with a piston. This stream was primarily intended for the operation of various machines and devices as part of the accelerated modernization of the Trbovlje mine, as well as the two neighboring mines Hrastnik and Zagorje, which was started by the then owner of the TPD mines. The construction facilities of the power plant along the Sava were: engine room, boiler room, space for high-voltage devices and devices for coal supplies.

=== Renovation and expansion of the power plant in 1938 and 1939 PE1 ===
After the global economic crisis with all its consequences, even in the case of expansion and increase of the capacity of the Trbovlje power plant, calmed down and the production of both coal and electricity consumption returned to normal and the mines started operating normally every day of the week and the TPD power plant through the Trbovlje mine in 1934 and 1935 finally started the reconstruction of the existing capacities and their increase in the Trbovlje power plant. After the preparatory work, the main work took place in 1937 and 1938, and was completed in November 1939.

The enlarged and modernized Trbovlje power plant began operating, albeit not at full capacity, in early 1939. The results showed quickly. The effects of large investments were manifested in various forms, especially in higher electricity production, higher consumption of coal, especially dust and coal sludge - sludge from the settling basin, cleanliness of the Sava River, more employees, the possibility of faster electrification of Slovenia, especially some areas. Until then, they had not been electrified, and the more normal work of the miners of the Trbovlje mine or mines - coal mines, which belonged to the TDP, was ensured. Other advantages became apparent in later years.

The major investments in the Trbovlje power plant in those years included: a new steam boiler, a new turbogenerator, a new switchyard, a settling pool-thickener (also called a mammoth device), the installation of the Trbovlje-Podlog transmission line, the connection of Kranj's KDE power plants to the Trbovlje power plant, covered coal dump and other accompanying devices - vacuum cleaners, chimney, warehouse, administrative building and more.

=== The struggle against the occupier in the years 1941 to 1945 ===
The forms of the Slovene nation's struggle against the occupiers in the years 1941 to 1945 were very different. One of these forms was the prevention and slowing down of construction and assembly works during the expansion of the Trbovlje power plant in the years 1942 to 1944, about which we state the data in the second place. In December 1942, the commissioning and trial operation of a new turbocharger began. As early as January 1943, one blade of the low-pressure part of the Siemens turbine broke off when it was idling in the presence of the installer and assembly engineer of the supplier company. The cause of the failure could not be determined.

However, the regular operation of all devices built in 1942 did not begin until mid-1943 and lasted until May 1944. During the revision of the turbine by a Siemens installer, the rotor blades were intentionally damaged due to improper use of the crane otherwise electrified in a domestic power plant. The rotor had to be sent back to the Muelhlheim / Ruhr factory. Due to transport problems caused by Allied bombs in rail and other transport, the repair lasted until September 1944. In December of the same year, this unit failed again due to another intentional damage - a compressed cooling pipe 1 m in diameter due to artificial vacuum. Repairing this took a month.

With such and similar actions of domestic workers, the production of electricity, which was still needed by the German war industry in particular, was disabled for a certain period of time. Thus, the German economy, especially the war economy, suffered great damage, expressed in the smaller production of machinery and equipment and armaments. This was the contribution of the workers of the Trbovlje power plant in the fight against the occupier.

Throughout the occupation period, there were several similar sabotage operations at the Trbovlje power plant with the same goals and purposes - to damage the German military machine and thus weaken it in the further course of the war and military operations.

=== Construction and operation from 1964 to 1968 - PE 2 ===
The construction of the Trbovlje 2 thermal power plant began on 31 May 1964. He emphasized the necessity and justification of the construction, with special regard to the large reserves of low-calorie coal lying in the area of the Zasavje districts. However, the previous capacities could not burn and refine all this available coal in the form of electricity. The strongest argument for the construction of a new thermal power plant was in the large coal reserves, especially in the Trbovlje area. Otherwise, all this coal would remain unexcavated in the cave, which would be a great loss for the national economy. This coal is expected to meet the needs of the thermal power plant for the next 80 years. They started building the facility in the middle of consumers and with minimal transport costs.

When the thermal power plant was upgraded and put into operation with a grand opening, major problems arose soon after the start of regular operation. They were mainly manifested by the beginning of ash slag in the boiler firebox, but there were also excessive vibrations and the eccentricity of the turbogenerator. After a lengthy determination of the causes, the authorized experts found that the suppliers of TPP Morava equipment did not dimension the boiler for the Trbovlje thermal power plant in relation to the delivered sample shipments of coal to Poland, and above all did not take into account the ash melting point.

Thus, the thermal power plant was forced to operate with a load of 105 to 110 MW, instead of the projected 125 MW, which depended on slag in the furnace. The consequences began to manifest in various forms. The Trbovlje and Hrastnik coal mines received the most comments due to the poorer quality of coal, as well as due to many non-combustible elements (stones, iron, clay, ...). Based on a number of interviews with responsible professionals, matters have normalized over time and more attention has been paid to the quality of coal at disconnection sites, transport, extraction and crushing of coal.

== See also ==
- List of towers
- List of chimneys
- List of tallest freestanding structures in the world
- List of power stations in Slovenia
