= Kum (mountain) =

Mountain in Slovenia

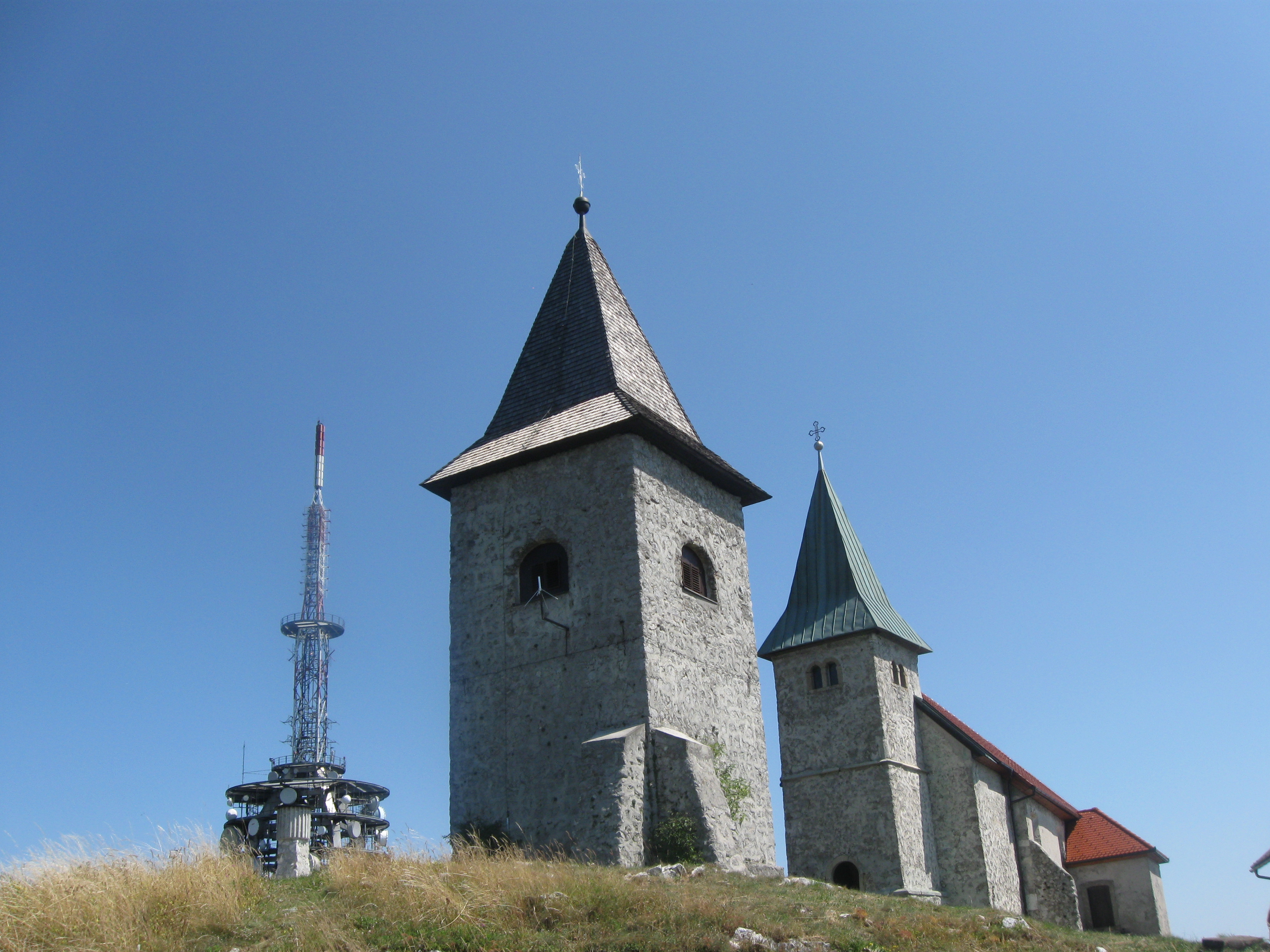
- The church and transmitter at the top of Kum

Highest point
- Elevation: 1,220 m (4,000 ft)
- Coordinates: 46°5′16.28″N 15°4′22.72″E

Geography
- Location within Slovenia
- Location: Slovenia
- Parent range: Sava Hills

Kum (pronounced [ˈkuːm]; German: Kumberg) is the highest peak in the Slovenian Sava Hills. Its summit is at 1,220 meters (4,000 ft) above sea level. The mountain is also called the "Sava Triglav" (Slovene: Zasavski Triglav) because it is the highest peak in the region. There are a number of structures at the summit, notably a church dedicated to Saint Agnes from the 17th century and a transmitter. It belongs to the settlement of Ključevica.

== Climate ==
Climate data for Kum 1981-2010 (1218m)
Month	Jan	Feb	Mar	Apr	May	Jun	Jul	Aug	Sep	Oct	Nov	Dec	Year
Mean daily maximum °C (°F)	−0.8 (30.6)	0.5 (32.9)	3.7 (38.7)	8.3 (46.9)	13.7 (56.7)	16.6 (61.9)	19.2 (66.6)	18.9 (66.0)	14.1 (57.4)	9.7 (49.5)	4.2 (39.6)	0.8 (33.4)	9.1 (48.3)
Daily mean °C (°F)	−2.9 (26.8)	−2.9 (26.8)	0.5 (32.9)	4.5 (40.1)	9.5 (49.1)	12.7 (54.9)	15.0 (59.0)	14.7 (58.5)	10.5 (50.9)	6.6 (43.9)	1.7 (35.1)	−1.7 (28.9)	5.7 (42.2)
Mean daily minimum °C (°F)	−5.3 (22.5)	−5.7 (21.7)	−2.4 (27.7)	1.4 (34.5)	6.4 (43.5)	9.4 (48.9)	11.5 (52.7)	11.6 (52.9)	8.0 (46.4)	4.2 (39.6)	−0.3 (31.5)	−3.9 (25.0)	2.9 (37.2)
Source: Slovenian Environment Agency (ARSO)

== See also ==
- Mountains of Slovenia
