= Retje nad Trbovljami =

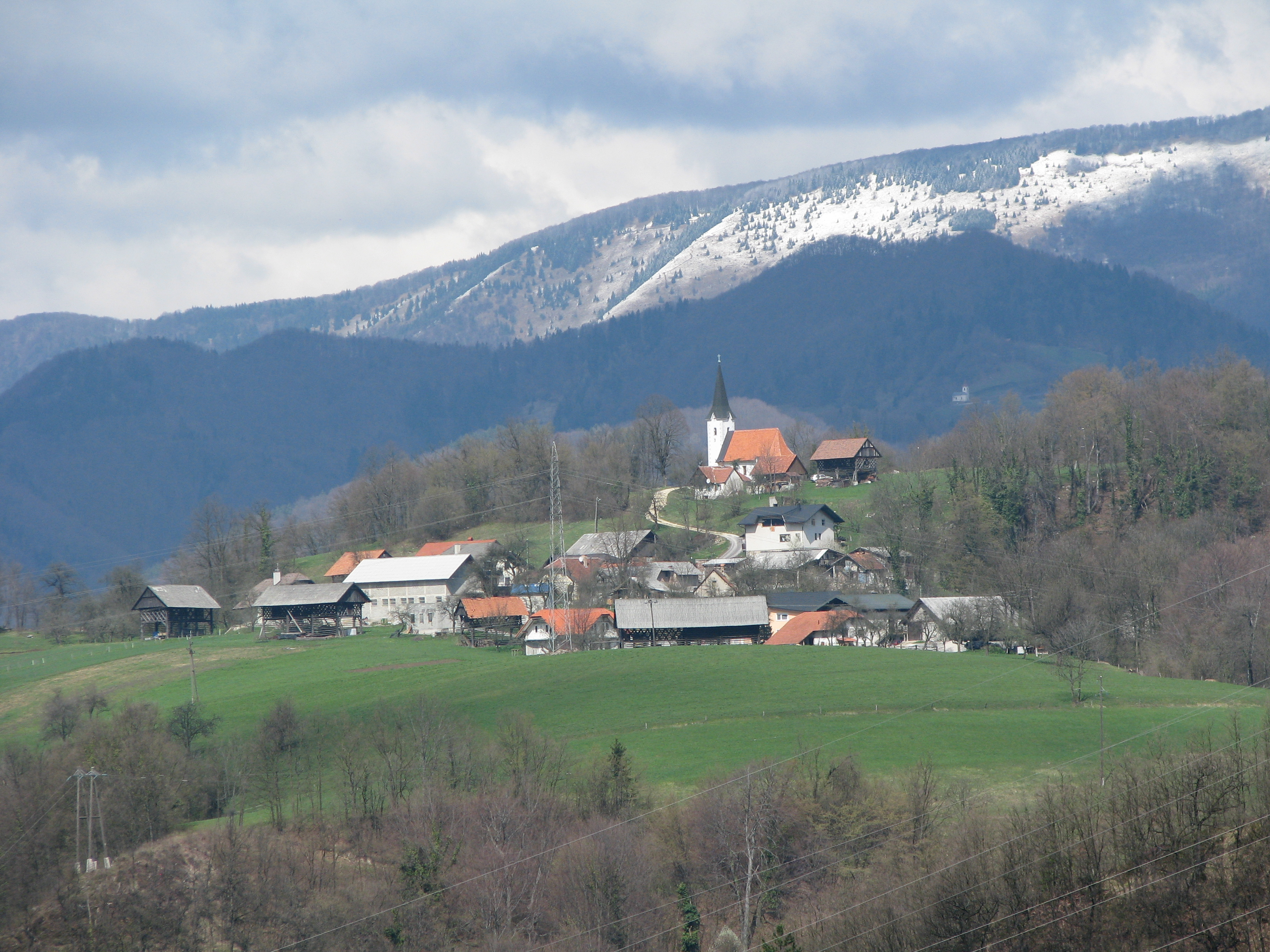
- Retje nad Trbovljami with Holy Cross Church

- Location in Slovenia
- Coordinates: 46°8′1″N 15°3′14″E
- Country: Slovenia
- Traditional region: Styria
- Statistical region: Central Sava
- Municipality: Trbovlje
- Elevation: 521 m (1,709 ft)
- Postal code: 1423

Retje nad Trbovljami (pronounced [ˈɾeːtjɛ nat təɾˈboːu̯ljami], in older sources also Vretje) is a settlement in the Municipality of Trbovlje in central Slovenia. It stands on a limestone ridge south of Trbovlje and is included with the rest of the municipality in the Central Sava Statistical Region. Historically, the settlement included the hamlets of Bevško, Dobrna, Glažuta, Na Pesku, and Za Savo.

== Name ==
Retje was renamed Retje nad Trbovljami (literally, 'Retje above Trbovlje') in 2014. The name Retje, which is shared with a number of other settlements, is derived from the Slovene common noun (v)retje 'powerful karst spring' (< *vrětje) in this case, referring to a hot spring below Retje Hill (Slovene: Retenjski hrib). Other places named Retje are probably derived from the plural demonym *Vrětьjane from the common noun *vertьje, referring to a geographical elevation (cf. Russian вереть, веретья 'elevated dry area in a swamp' and веретея 'small field').

== History ==
The area was already populated in prehistoric times, indicated by the remains of a prehistoric hill fort on Beech Mountain (Slovene: Bukova gora, 547 m) southwest of the settlement. Finds from Antiquity include 553 gold and silver coins and Roman gravestones, indicating that there was a Roman settlement at the site. Under the Illyrian Provinces in the early 19th century, a French guard post was established at the Sušnik Inn in order to prevent smuggling of goods from Austria. A fire in 1847 destroyed the entire village except for the church. Mining activity in the area undermined much of the settlement, causing collapses and damage to houses significant enough that many people moved away. It was annexed by the town of Trbovlje in 1953, ending its existence as an independent settlement. Retje nad Trbovljami was reestablished as an independent settlement in 2014.

=== Mass grave ===
Retje nad Trbovljami is the site of a mass grave associated with the Second World War. The Retje Mass Grave (Grobišče Retje) is located below the wall north of Holy Cross Church. It contains the remains of undetermined victims.

== Church ==
The local church is dedicated to the Holy Cross and belongs to the Parish of Trbovlje–St. Mary, part of the Diocese of Celje. Folk tradition states that it is built on the foundation of a pagan temple. The church was first mentioned in 1545, and it has a rectangular nave with a polygonal chancel walled on three sides. A bell tower is built against the west side of the church and there is a chapel on the north side. The arches in the nave and chancel are relatively recent, probably created when the chapel was added. The furnishings in the church are Baroque. The main altar dates from 1781, and the side altar, which is dedicated to Saint Agnes, is from the 16th century, although some of its sculptures are more recent. The chapel altar is also Baroque. A number of Roman gravestones are built into the exterior wall of the church.
