= Ostenk =

Ostenk Sveti Marko (until 1955)
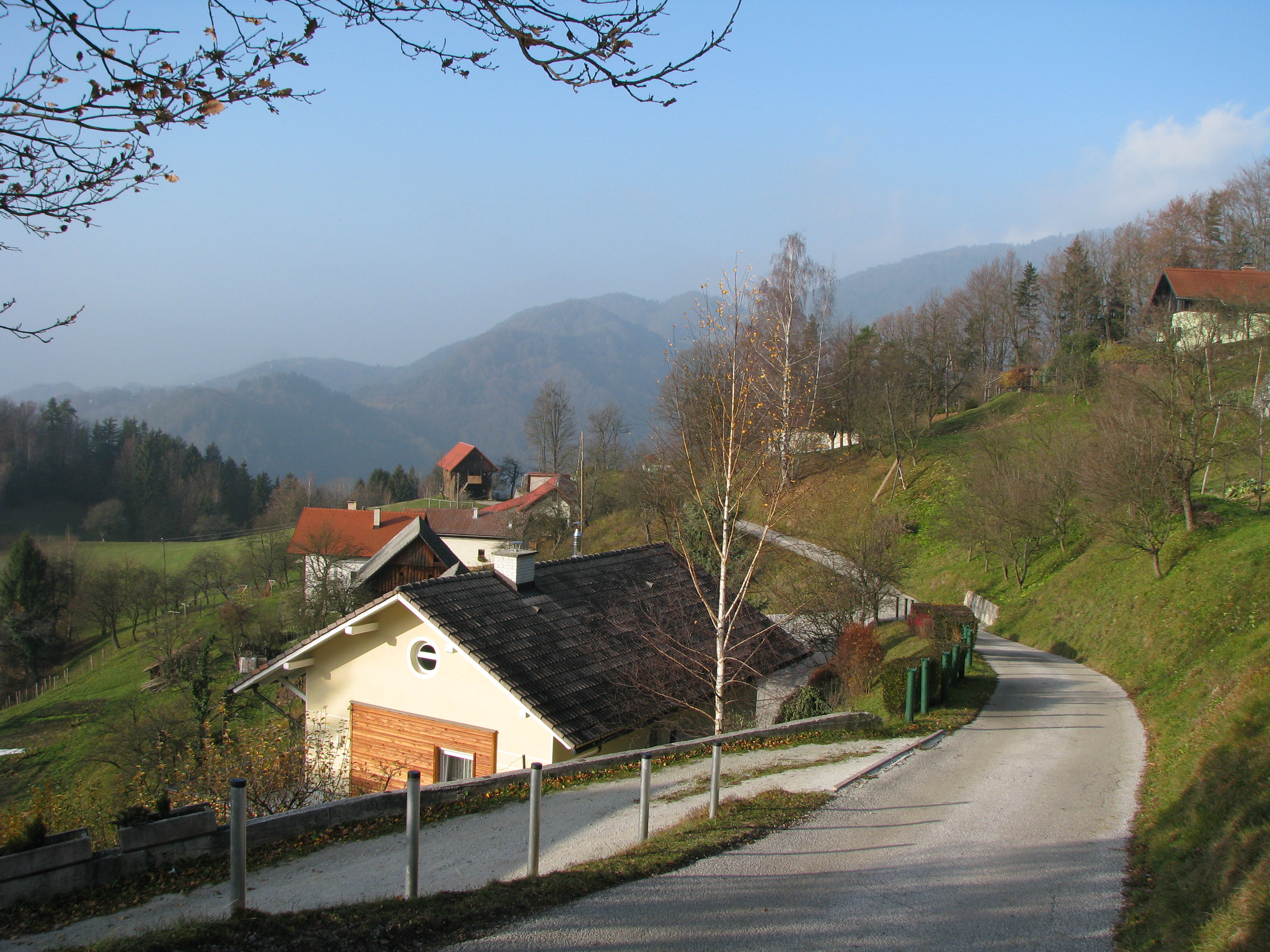

- Location in Slovenia
- Coordinates: 46°10′0.12″N 15°4′8.95″E
- Country: Slovenia
- Traditional region: Styria
- Statistical region: Central Sava
- Municipality: Trbovlje

Area
  - Total: 1.97 km^{2} (0.76 sq mi)
- Elevation: 529.6 m (1,738 ft)

Population (2002)
  - Total: 190
- Postal code: 1420

Ostenk (pronounced [ɔˈsteːŋk]; sometimes Ostenik) is a settlement in the Municipality of Trbovlje in central Slovenia. It lies in the hills northeast of the town of Trbovlje. The area is part of the traditional region of Styria. It is now included with the rest of the municipality in the Central Sava Statistical Region. Ostenk is a scattered settlement on a ridge centered on the Ostenk Crest (Slovene: Zaosteniški preval). It is bordered to the south by Ostenik Hill—which is also known as Žrebelj Hill (Slovene: Žrebeljnov hrib, literally 'nail hill') on the Hrastnik side.

== Name ==
The name of the settlement was changed from Sveti Marko (literally, 'Saint Mark') to Ostenk in 1955. The name was changed on the basis of the 1948 Law on Names of Settlements and Designations of Squares, Streets, and Buildings as part of efforts by Slovenia's postwar communist government to remove religious elements from toponyms. The settlement was known as Jelšje in the 18th century, when it consisted of two farms. The name Jelšje now refers to a hamlet of Ostenk northwest of the main settlement.

== Church ==
The local church is dedicated to Saint Mark and belongs to the Parish of Trbovlje. It dates to the 16th century with some 17th-century alterations. It is a single-nave structure with a narrow octagonal chancel and a bell tower that was added later. The furnishings are mostly Baroque. The main altar dates from the 18th century, and the two side altars are late Baroque.
