= Klek, Istočno Novo Sarajevo =

Klek Клек
- Village
- Location within Republika Srpska Location within Bosnia and Herzegovina
- Coordinates: 43°47′49″N 18°25′08″E
- Country: Bosnia and Herzegovina
- Entity: Republika Srpska
- Municipality: Istočno Novo Sarajevo
- Time zone: UTC+1 (CET)
  - Summer (DST): UTC+2 (CEST)

Klek (Serbian Cyrillic: Клек) is a village in Bosnia and Herzegovina. According to the 2013 census, it had a population of 145 inhabitants. The village is located in the municipality of Istočno Novo Sarajevo, Republika Srpska, Bosnia and Herzegovina.
