= Vrhe, Trbovlje =

Vrhe Sveti Lenart (until 1955)
- Location in Slovenia
- Coordinates: 46°11′23.12″N 15°0′44.31″E
- Country: Slovenia
- Traditional region: Styria
- Statistical region: Central Sava
- Municipality: Trbovlje

Area
  - Total: 1.31 km^{2} (0.51 sq mi)
- Elevation: 813.4 m (2,669 ft)

Population (2002)
  - Total: 23
- Postal code: 1420

Vrhe (pronounced [ʋəɾˈxeː]) is a settlement in the Municipality of Trbovlje in central Slovenia. It lies in the hills northwest of the town of Trbovlje and part of the settlement lies in the neighbouring Municipality of Zagorje ob Savi. The area is part of the traditional region of Styria. It is now included with the rest of the municipality in the Central Sava Statistical Region.

== Name ==
The name of the settlement was changed from Sveti Lenart (literally, 'Saint Leonard') to Vrhe (literally, 'peaks') in 1955. The name was changed on the basis of the 1948 Law on Names of Settlements and Designations of Squares, Streets, and Buildings as part of efforts by Slovenia's postwar communist government to remove religious elements from toponyms.
