= Sveta Planina =

Sveta Planina Partizanski Vrh (1955–2002)
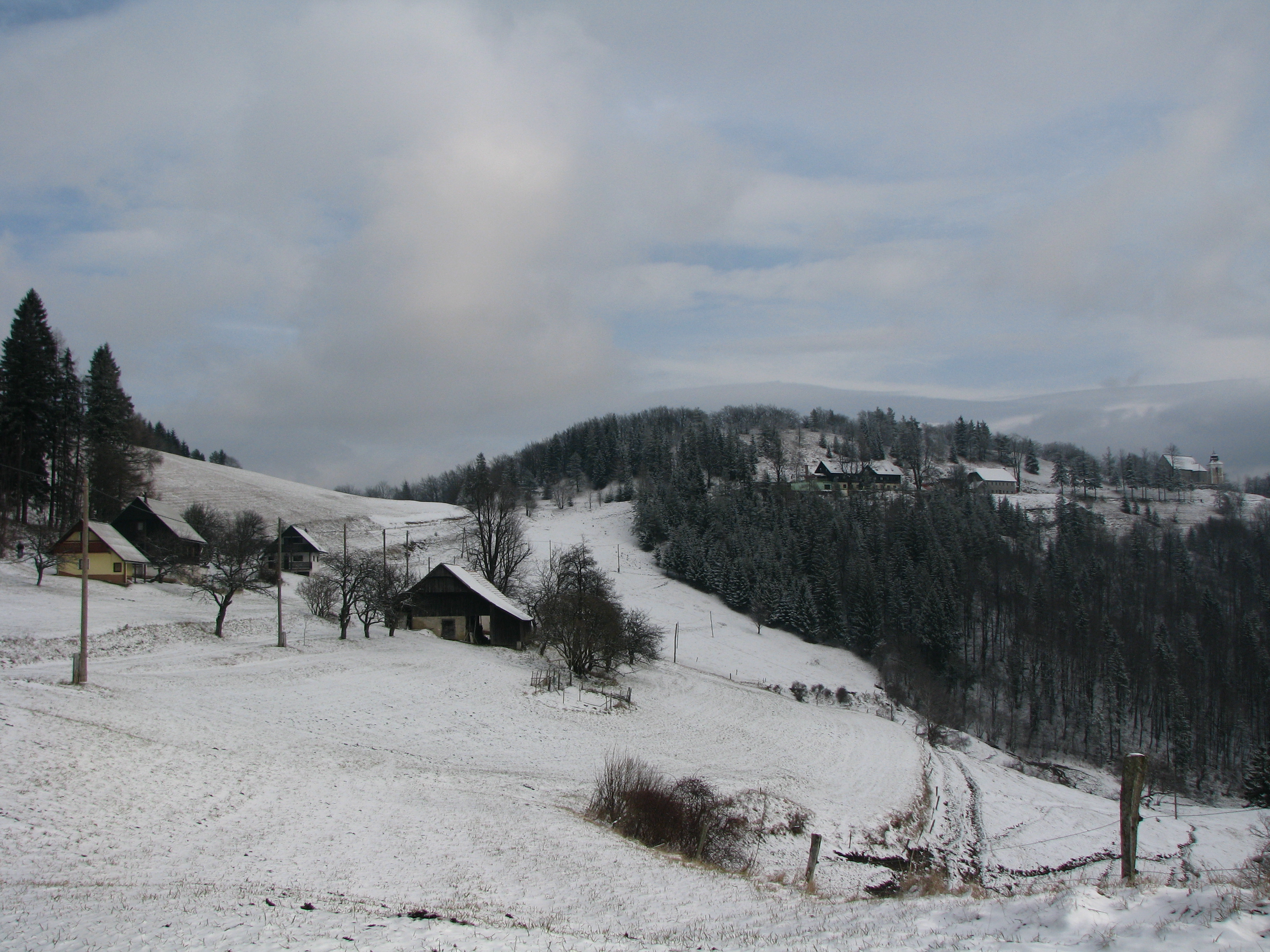

- Location in Slovenia
- Coordinates: 46°10′12.51″N 15°0′38.7″E
- Country: Slovenia
- Traditional region: Styria
- Statistical region: Central Sava
- Municipality: Trbovlje

Area
  - Total: 2.18 km^{2} (0.84 sq mi)
- Elevation: 595.6 m (1,954 ft)

Population (2002)
  - Total: 78
- Postal code: 1420

Sveta Planina (pronounced [ˈsʋèːta plaˈnìːna]; German: Heilige Alpe) is a settlement in the Municipality of Trbovlje in central Slovenia. It lies in the hills northwest of the town of Trbovlje. The area is part of the traditional region of Styria. It is now included with the rest of the municipality in the Central Sava Statistical Region.

== Name ==
The name of the settlement was changed from Sveta Planina (literally, 'holy mountain pasture') to Partizanski Vrh (literally, 'Partisan peak') in 1955. The name was changed on the basis of the 1948 Law on Names of Settlements and Designations of Squares, Streets, and Buildings as part of efforts by Slovenia's postwar communist government to remove religious elements from toponyms. The name Sveta Planina was restored in 2002. In the past the German name was Heilige Alpe.

== Church ==
The local parish church, built on a hill northeast of the main settlement, is dedicated to the Holy Name of Mary and belongs to the Roman Catholic Archdiocese of Ljubljana. It dates to the late 18th century.
