= Municipality of Trbovlje =

Municipality of Slovenia

Municipality of Trbovlje Občina Trbovlje
- Municipality
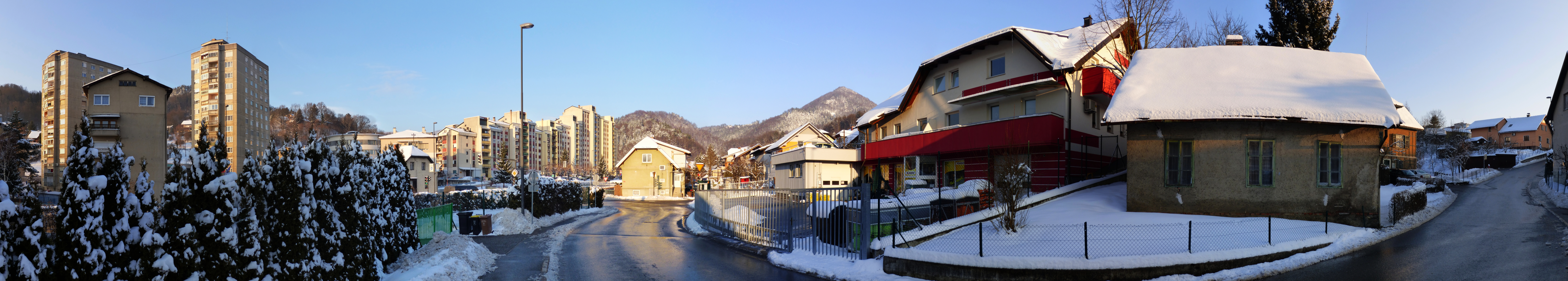

- Location of the Municipality of Trbovlje in Slovenia
- Coordinates: 46°09′N 15°03′E
- Country: Slovenia

Government
  - Mayor: Zoran Poznič

Area
  - Total: 57.8 km^{2} (22.3 sq mi)

Population (2002)
  - Total: 18,248
  - Density: 316/km^{2} (818/sq mi)
- Time zone: UTC+01 (CET)
  - Summer (DST): UTC+02 (CEST)
- Website: www.trbovlje.si
- Source: Statistical Office of the Republic of Slovenia, census of 2002

The Municipality of Trbovlje (pronounced [təɾˈbɔ̀u̯ːljɛ]; Slovene: Občina Trbovlje) is a municipality in central Slovenia. The seat of the municipality is the town of Trbovlje.

== Settlements ==
In addition to the municipal seat of Trbovlje, the municipality also includes the following settlements:

- Čebine
- Čeče
- Dobovec
- Gabrsko
- Klek
- Ključevica
- Knezdol
- Ojstro
- Ostenk
- Planinska Vas
- Prapreče
- Retje nad Trbovljami
- Škofja Riža
- Sveta Planina
- Vrhe
- Završje
- Župa
