= Dobovec, Trbovlje =

Dobovec
- Location in Slovenia
- Coordinates: 46°6′38.99″N 15°3′31.9″E
- Country: Slovenia
- Traditional region: Lower Carniola
- Statistical region: Central Sava
- Municipality: Trbovlje

Area
  - Total: 5.75 km^{2} (2.22 sq mi)
- Elevation: 697.1 m (2,287 ft)

Population (2002)
  - Total: 188
- Postal code: 1423

Dobovec (pronounced [dɔˈbɔːʋəts] or [dɔˈboːʋəts]; German: Dobouz) is a settlement in the Municipality of Trbovlje in central Slovenia. It lies in the hills above the right bank of the Sava River. The area is part of the traditional region of Lower Carniola. It is now included with the rest of the municipality in the Central Sava Statistical Region.

== Name ==
The name Dobovec is derived from the adjective dobov, based on the common noun *dǫbъ 'deciduous tree, oak'. Like similar names (e.g., Dobova, Dobovica), it originally referred to the local vegetation. In the past the German name was Dobouz.

== History ==
Early settlement of the area is attested by the remnants of a prehistoric mound grave and dwellings. During the Second World War, many farmers were evicted from the Dobovec by German forces.

=== Mass graves ===
Dobovec is the site of two known mass graves associated with the Second World War. They both contain the remains of unidentified victims. The Dobovec Mass Grave (Slovene: Grobišče Dobovec) is located on an embankment between the Sava River and the main road. The Ustaša Ravine Mass Grave (Grobišče Ustašev graben) lies in the woods next to a creek opposite the landmark Trbovlje Chimney.

== Church ==
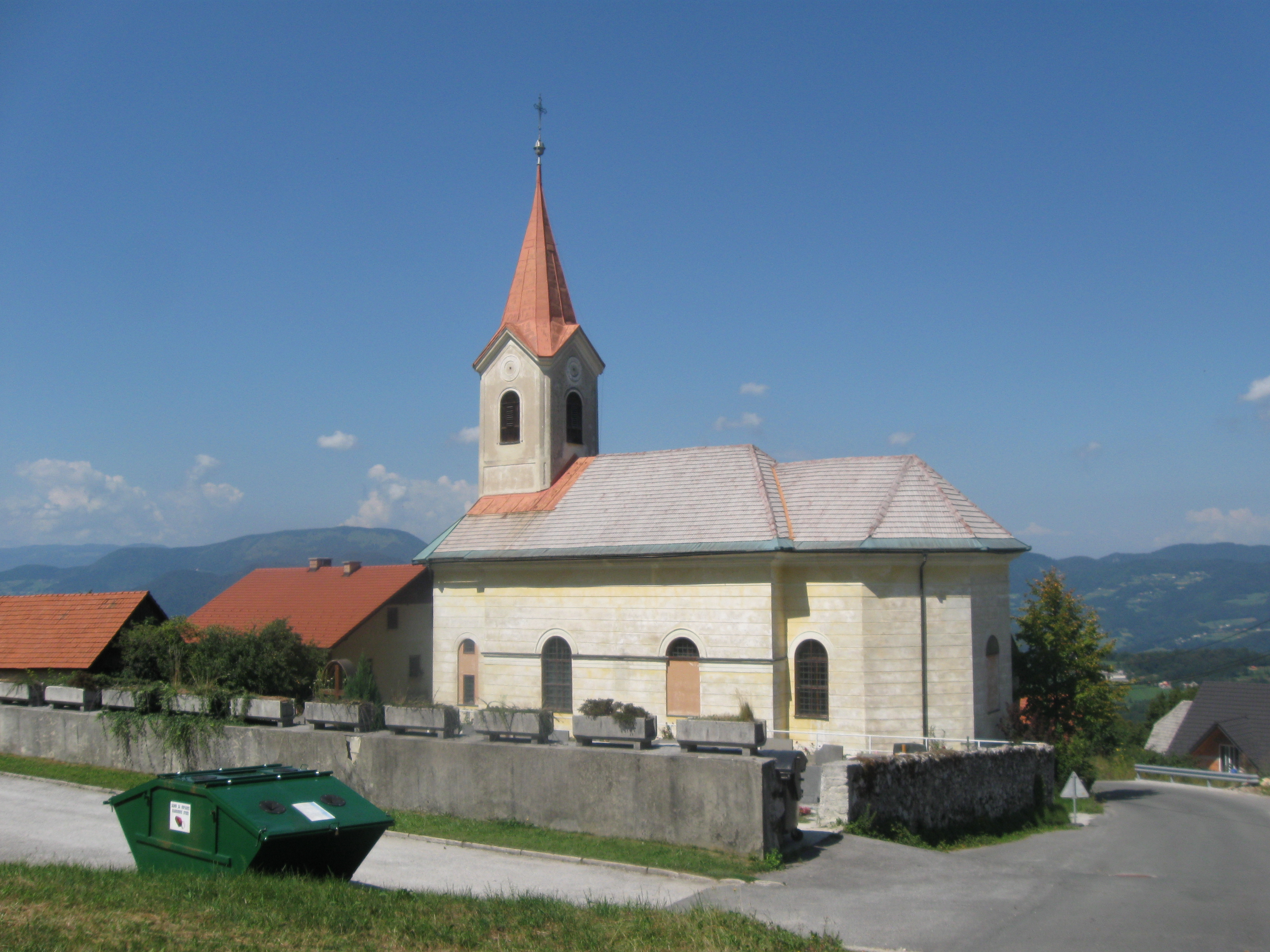
St. Anne's Church in Dobovec

The parish church in the village is dedicated to Saint Anne and belongs to the Roman Catholic Archdiocese of Ljubljana. It is a Late Baroque building dating to the second half of the 18th century with 19th-century adaptations. The church was elevated to a parish in 1776. The main altar dates from 1846. The right altar painting of Saint Joseph is an 1847 work by Josip Egartner, and the left altar painting of the Annunciation is also believed to be his work.
