= Trbovlje =

- Town
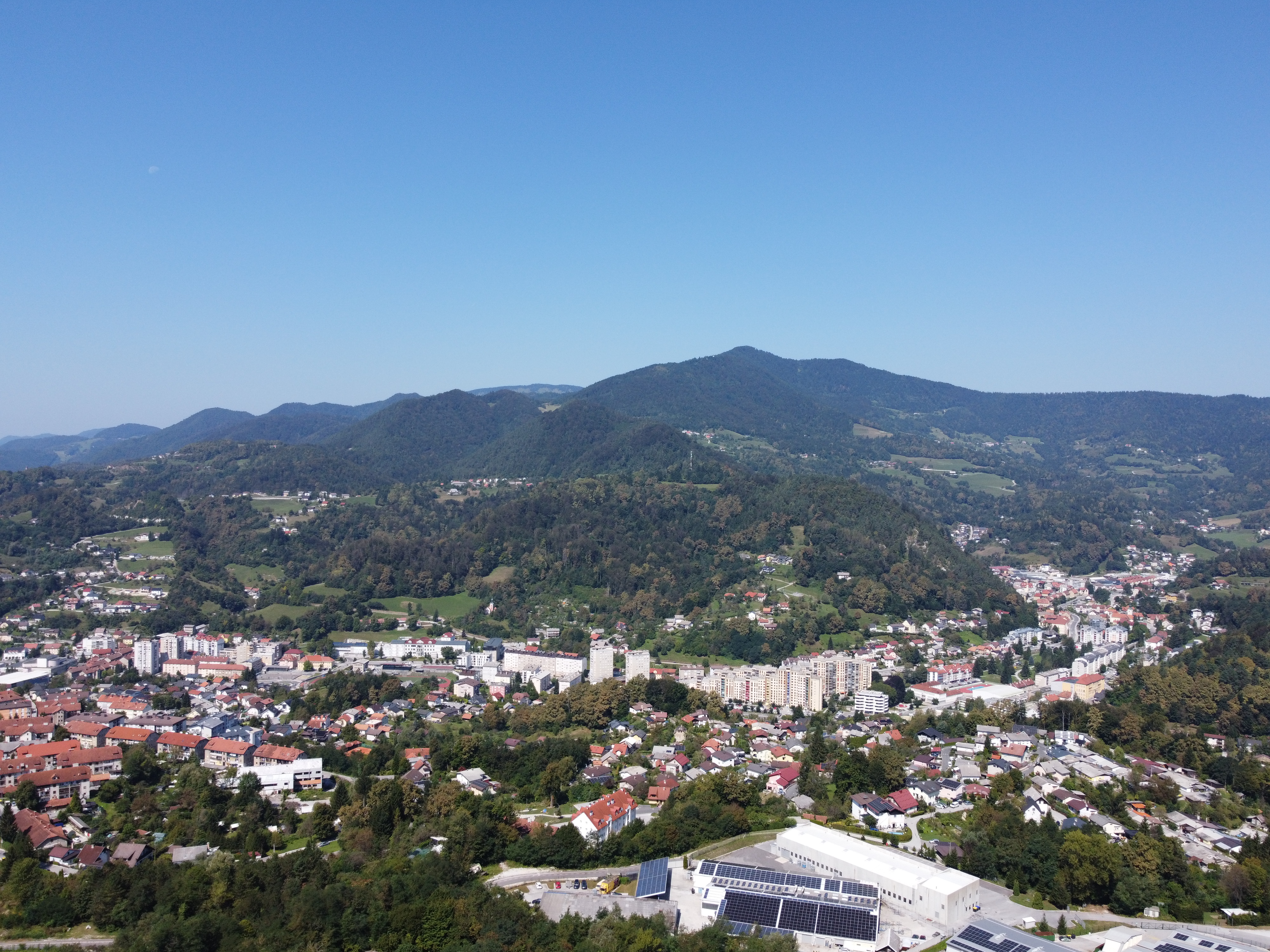
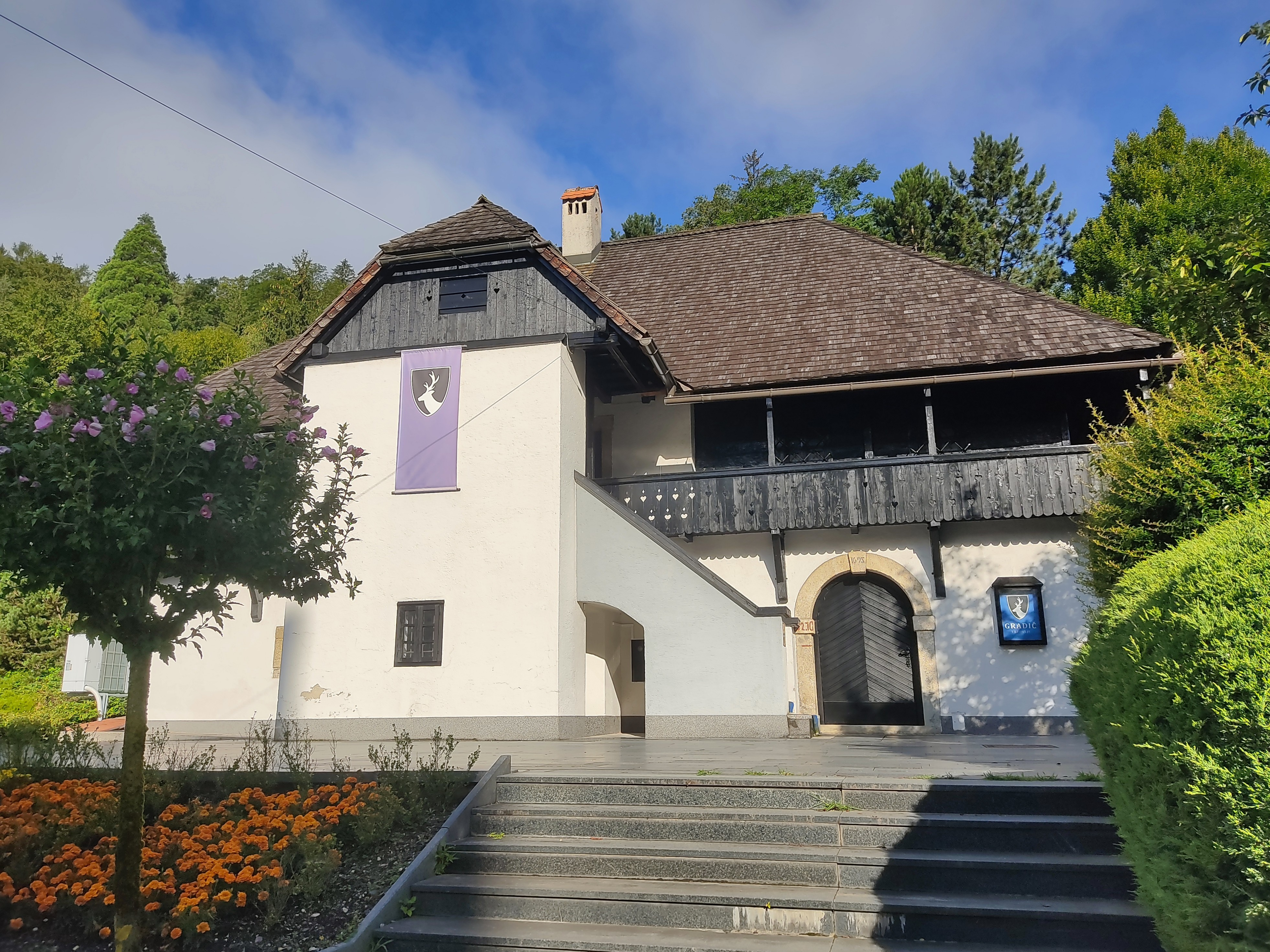
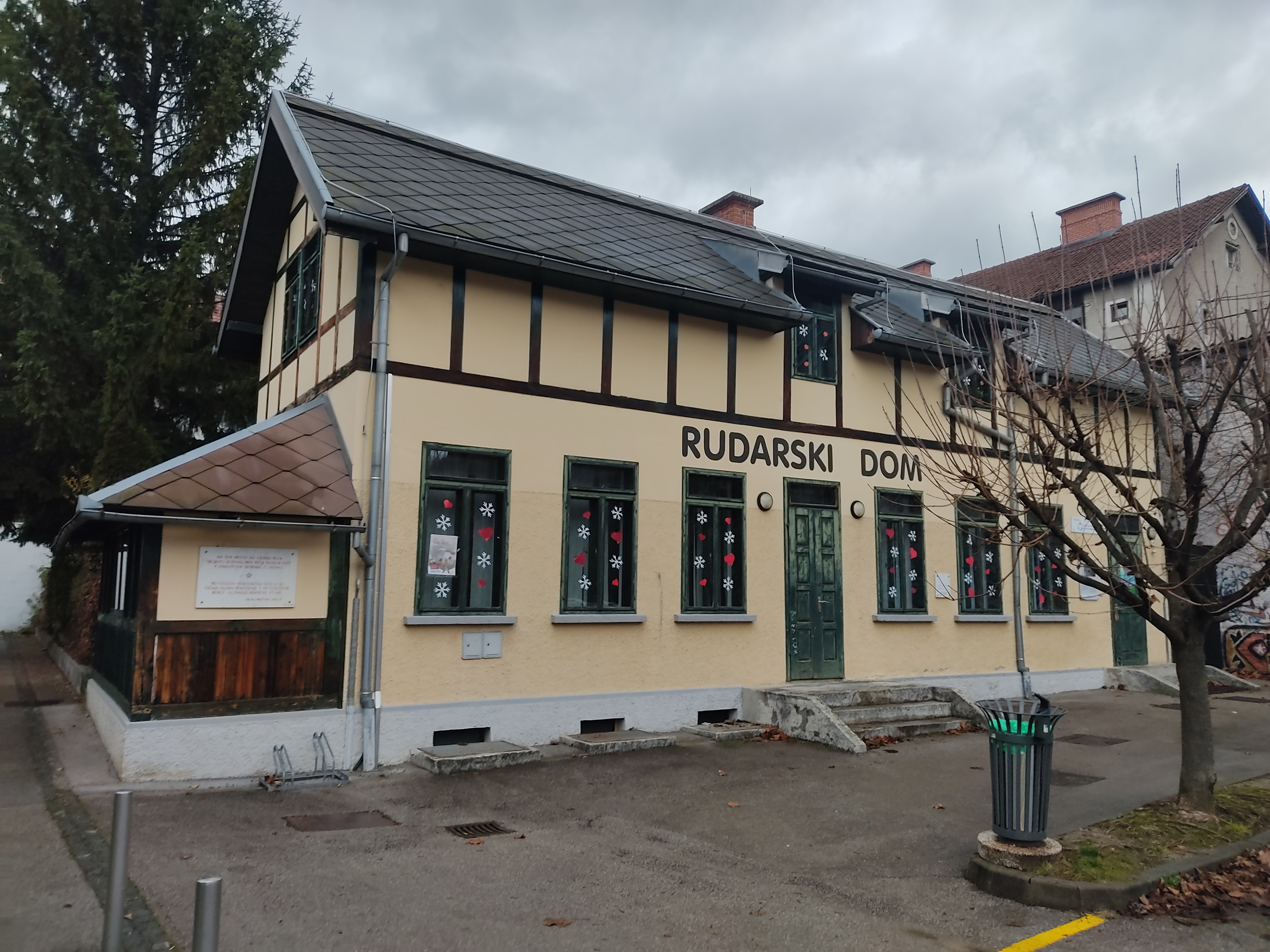
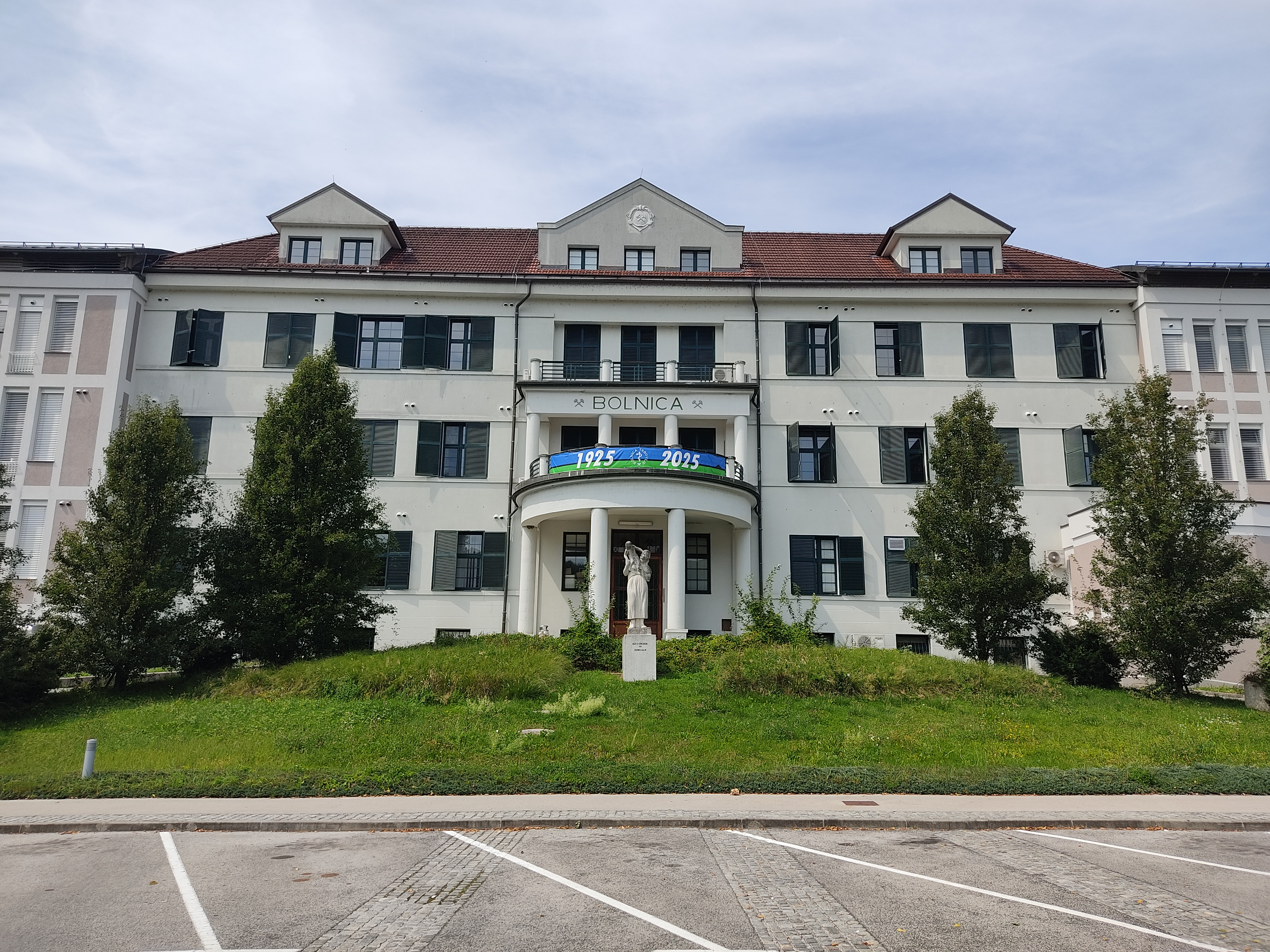
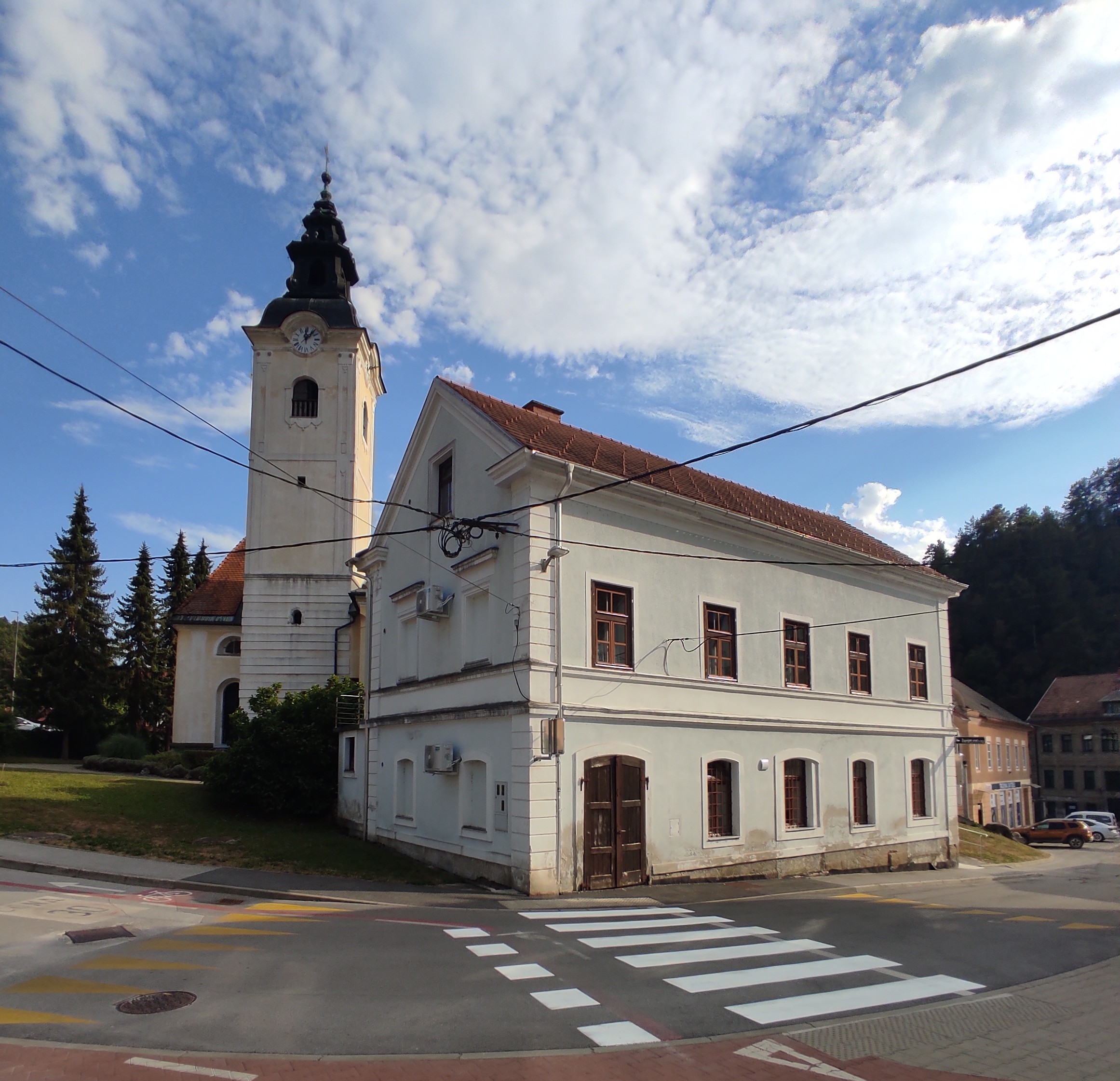
- View from above Hunting Lodge Miner Hall Trbovlje Chimney General Hospital St. Martin's Church and Fakin House

- Flag Coat of arms

- Location in Slovenia
- Coordinates: 46°09′N 15°03′E
- Country: Slovenia
- Traditional region: Styria
- Statistical region: Central Sava
- Municipality: Trbovlje
- Settled: 1220s
- Incorporated: 1850

Government
  - Mayor: Zoran Poznič

Area
  - Total: 10.2 km^{2} (3.9 sq mi)
- Elevation: 307 m (1,007 ft)

Population (2020)
  - Total: 13,822
  - Rank: 11th, Slovenia
  - Density: 1,360/km^{2} (3,510/sq mi)
- Time zone: UTC+01:00 (CET)
  - Summer (DST): UTC+02:00 (CEST)
- Postal code: 1420
- Area code: 03 (+386 3 from abroad)
- Vehicle registration: LJ
- Google Maps: Trbovlje, Slovenia
- Climate: Cfb
- Website: www.trbovlje.si

Trbovlje (Slovene: [təɾˈbɔ̀ːwljɛ]; German: Trifail) is Slovenia's eleventh-largest town, located in the traditional province of Styria and acting as the seat of the Municipality of Trbovlje. A historically renowned mining town, Trbovlje is located in the valley of a minor left tributary of the Sava River in the Central Sava Valley in central-eastern Slovenia.

== Name ==
Trbovlje was attested in written sources in 1220–30 as Trefeul (and as Trevůl and Trevol in 1265–67, Triuella in 1302, Trifeul in 1325, Triueal in 1330, and Triuel in 1424). The name is a feminine plural noun in standard Slovene, but in the local dialect it is declined as a neuter singular adjective. This indicates that the name is derived from *Trěbovľe selo (literally, 'Trěbo's village'), referring to an early inhabitant of the place. In the past the German name was Trifail.

== History ==
Coal mining began at Beech Mountain (Slovene: Bukova gora, 547 meters or 1,795 feet) south of the town in 1804. The town was connected to the Austrian Southern Railway in 1849, which contributed to its further development. During the 19th century, a cement plant, mechanical separator, sawmill, and power plant were built in Trbovlje.

Poor social conditions in Trbovlje led to several strikes by mine workers, and the town became a center of the leftist movement and communist agitation. On June 1, 1924, there was a clash between workers and members of the Organization of Yugoslav Nationalists that resulted in several fatalities on both sides. In 1934, miners staged a sitdown strike at the mine.

=== Second World War ===
During the Second World War, Trbovlje, along with the rest of Lower Styria, was annexed to the Third Reich. The coal mine and other industries of Trbovlje were especially important to the German authorities, and they initially lowered unemployment in the town and increased wages, increasing satisfaction with the new regime. However, the arrest and exile of Slovenes in August 1941 created disaffection. This and other repressive measures resulted in an estimated 90% of the population opposing the Germans by the summer of 1944.

=== Mass grave ===
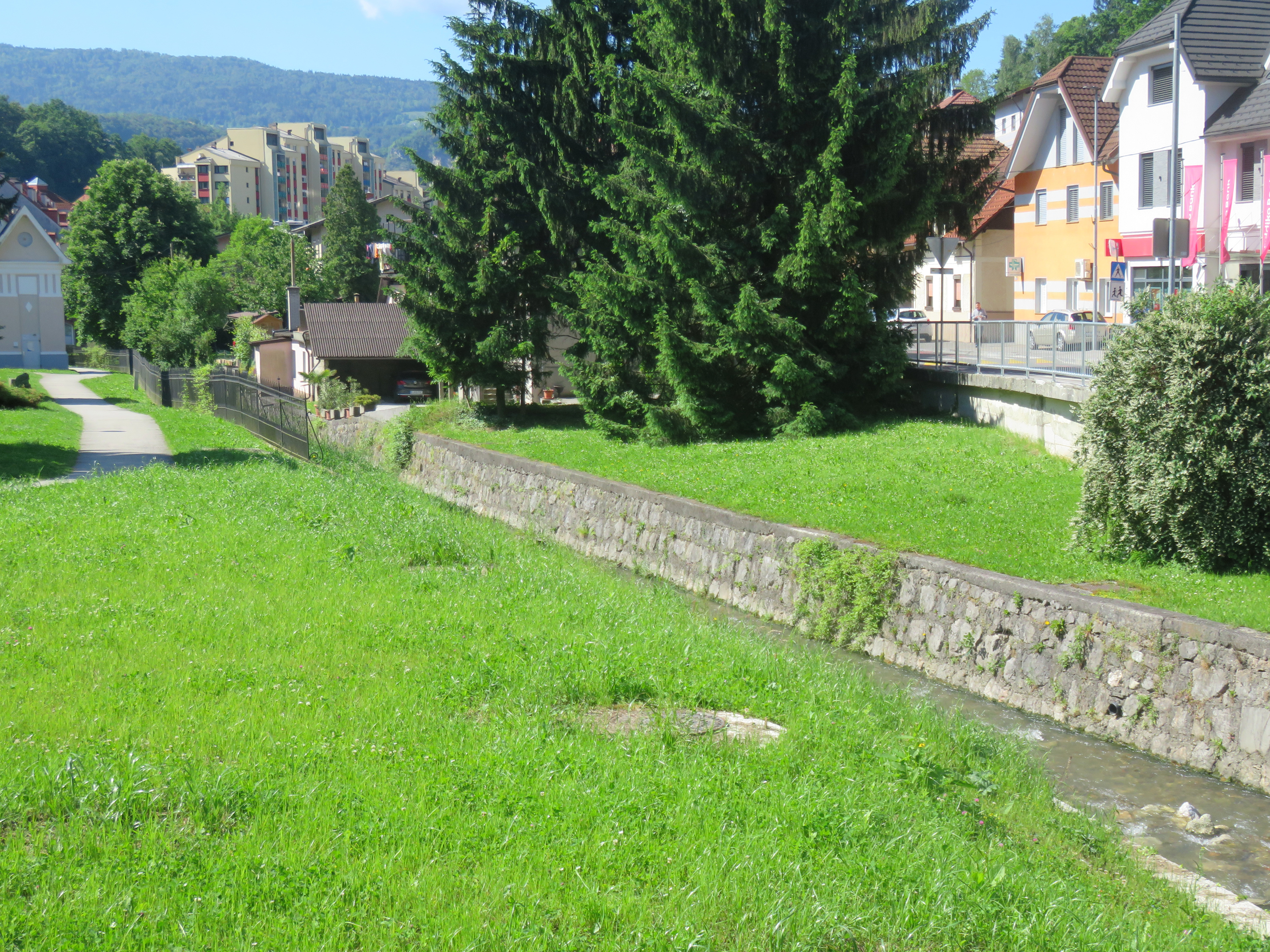
Abandoned Cemetery Mass Grave

The Abandoned Cemetery Mass Grave (Slovene: Grobišče na opuščenem pokopališču) site, associated with World War II, is located in the former cemetery in the northern part of the town, between the fence and Trboveljščica Creek. It is also known as the Town Park Mass Grave (Grobišče Mestni park), and it contains the remains of about 30 German soldiers.

== Culture ==
The Trbovlje Museum (Slovene: Zasavski Muzej Trbovlje) has a large section dedicated to the history of mining.

The Slovenian industrial band Laibach also originated in Trbovlje.

The Trbovlje Student Club organization (Slovene: Klub trboveljskih študentov) holds various events.

== Economy ==
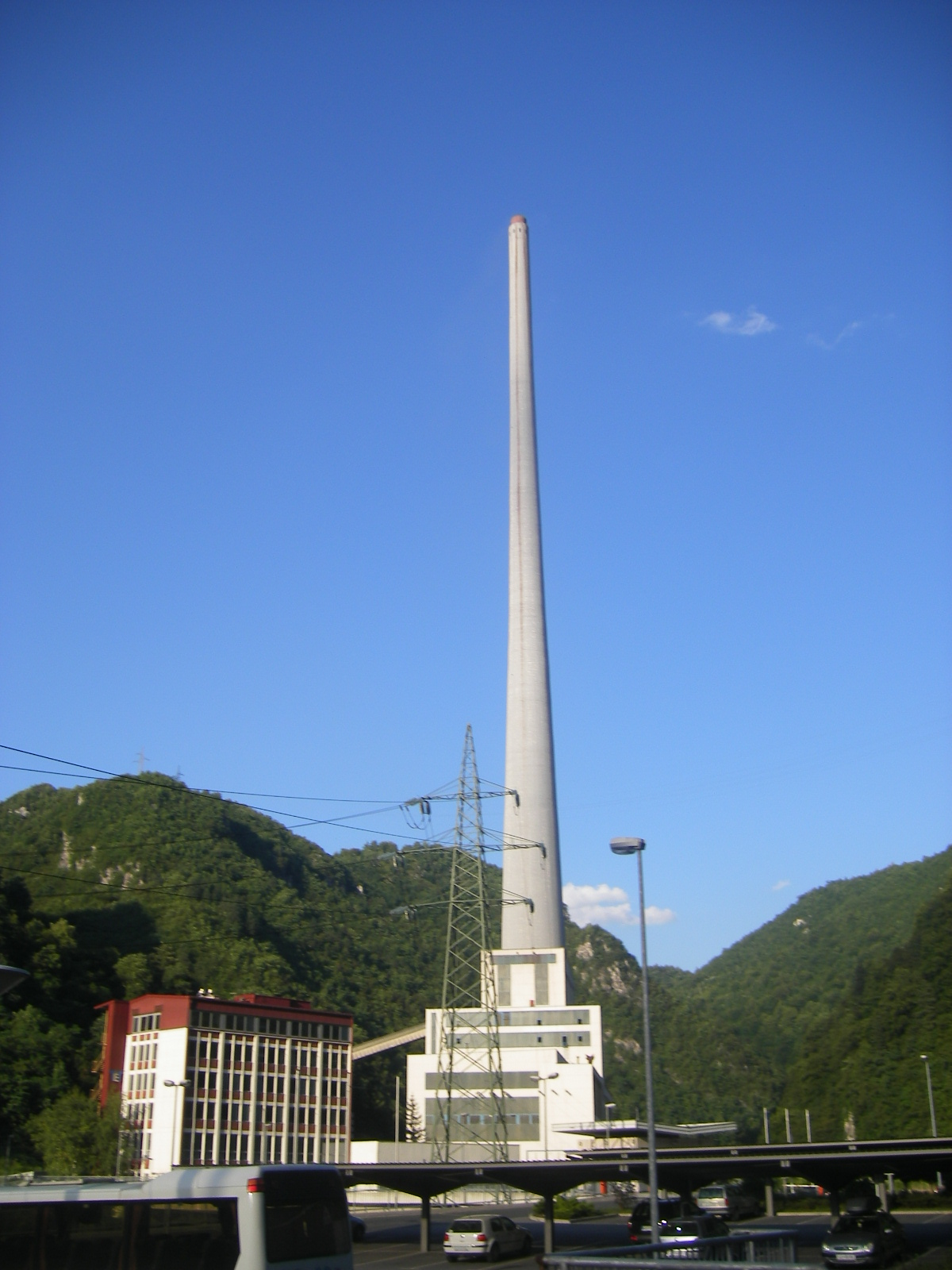
Trbovlje Chimney

Trbovlje is known for its long coal mining history. Trbovlje is also known for Trbovlje Power Station, which is the location of European Union's tallest chimney at 360 meters. In the past there were companies such as Strojna Tovarna Trbovlje - STT, Iskra, Mehanika, and Cementarna Trbovlje, which employed many highly skilled people and contributed to the economy. Due to their size this was not felt only locally but nationally.

== Parishes and churches ==
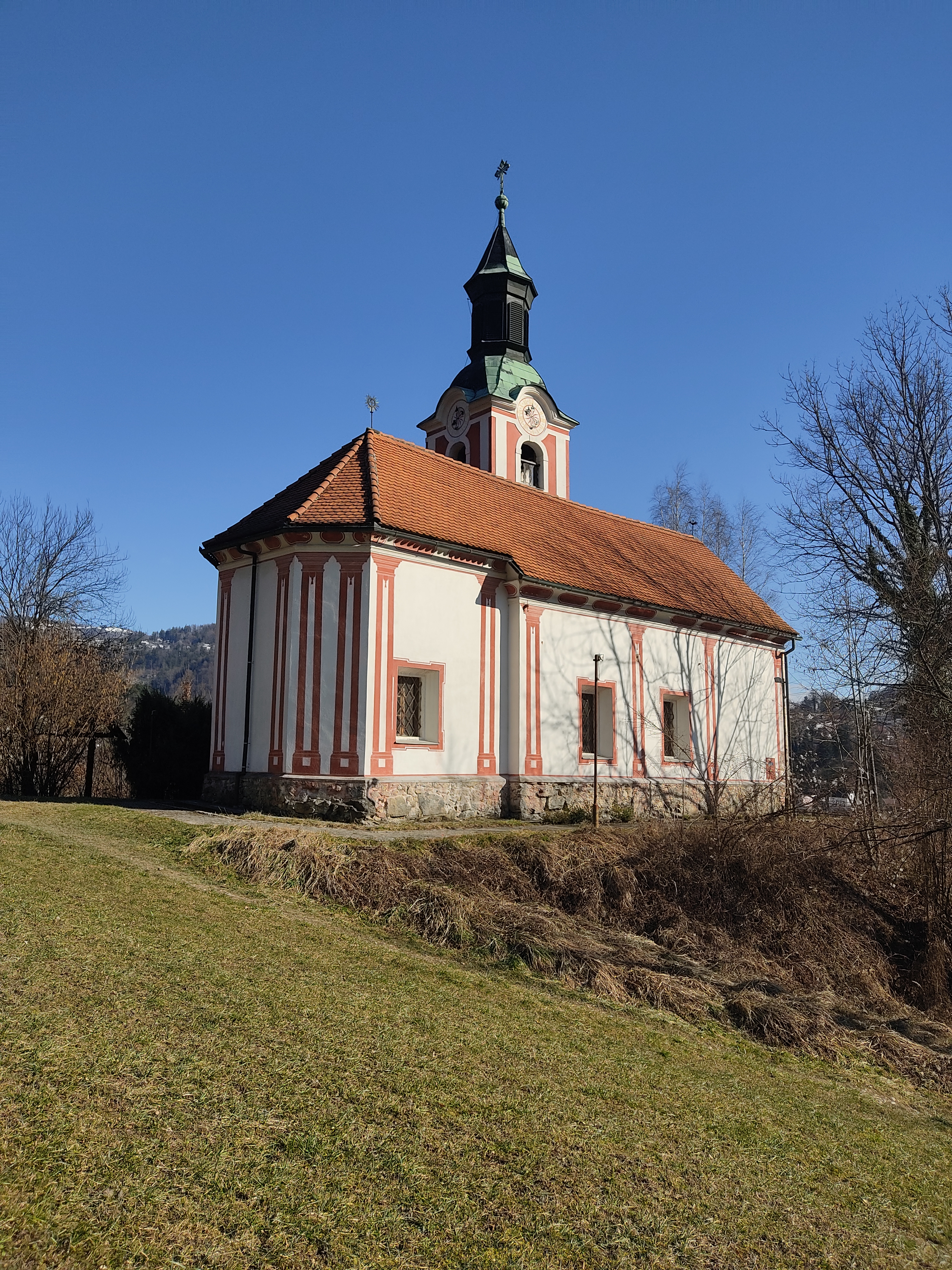
Saint Nicholas's Church

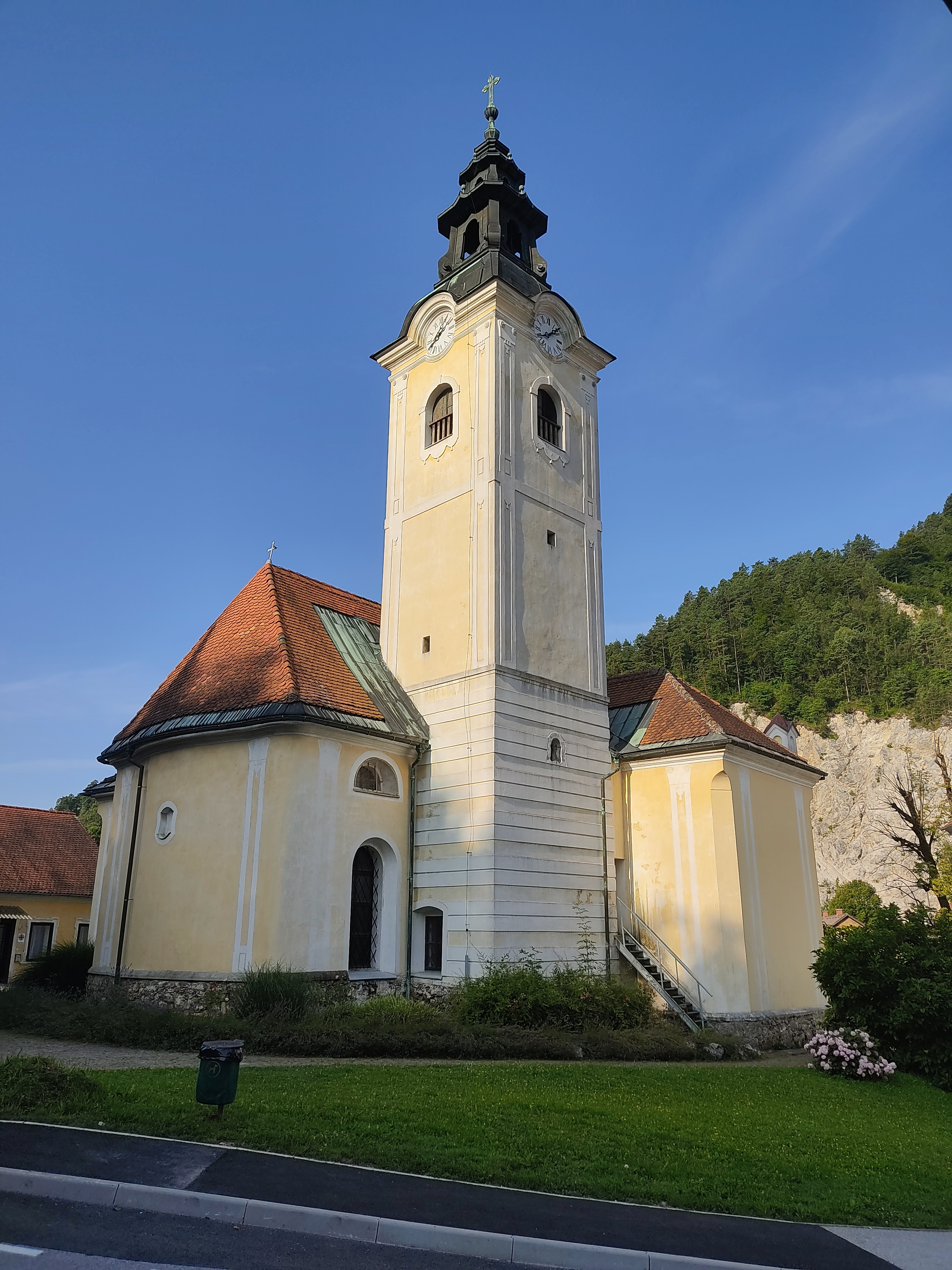
Saint Martin's Church

Two Roman Catholic parishes have their seat in Trbovlje: the Parish of Trbovlje–Saint Martin and the Parish of Trbovlje–Saint Mary. Both belong to the Diocese of Celje.

Saint Martin's Parish Church was originally a Romanesque church, of which part of the nave survives. The sanctuary is Gothic and in the 18th century a Baroque belfry and chapel were added. In the 19th century the nave was extended. A second church in the Parish of Trbovlje–Saint Martin in the western end of town is dedicated to Saint Nicholas and was built in the 18th century.

The Parish of Trbovlje–Saint Mary in the southern part of the town was established in 2000. Its parish church is dedicated to the Virgin Mary, Mother of the Church. It was built from 1998 to 2000 according to plans by the architect Jože Marinko. Stained glasses, paintings, and the Stations of the Cross were created by the academy-trained painter Lojze Čemažar. The church was blessed in August 2000 and consecrated in October 2007.

A significant portion of Trbovlje's populace today describe themselves as atheists, in third place behind Catholic and "no response."

== Twin places ==
- Sallaumines, northern France since 1964. There is a street in Sallaumines named Trbovlje, and a street in Trbovlje named Sallaumines. There are also regular short-term exchanges of schoolchildren.
