= List of Slovenian medical doctors =

This list of Slovenian medical doctors includes notable physicians and surgeons, medical scientists and medical doctors from Slovenia or its territory, and of Slovene descent. Physicians of all specialities may be listed here.

== Alphabetical list ==
=== A ===
- Bojan Accetto

=== B ===
- Peter Bossman

=== C, Č ===
- France Cukjati

=== G ===
- Marko Gerbec
- Marko Godina

=== H ===
- Belsazar Hacquet
- Matija Horvat

=== I ===
- Alojz Ihan
- Alojz Ipavec
- Benjamin Ipavec
- Gustav Ipavec
- Josip Ipavec

=== J ===
- Andrej Janež
- Janez Janež
- Berta Jereb

=== K ===
- Valentina Kobe

=== L ===
- Miha Likar
- Danilo Lokar

=== M ===
- Dorjan Marušič

=== N ===
- Robert Neubauer

=== P ===
- Andreas Perlach
- Janez Podobnik
- Friderik Pregl

=== S, Š ===
- Viljem Ščuka

=== T ===
- Stanko Tavčar

=== V ===
- Josip Vošnjak

=== Z, Ž ===
- Slavko Ziherl

== See also ==
- List of physicians
- List of Slovenian scientists
- List of Slovenian inventors
