= Christian Medical College, Ludhiana =

Medical institution in Ludhiana, Punjab

Coordinates: 30.910531°N 75.863396°E

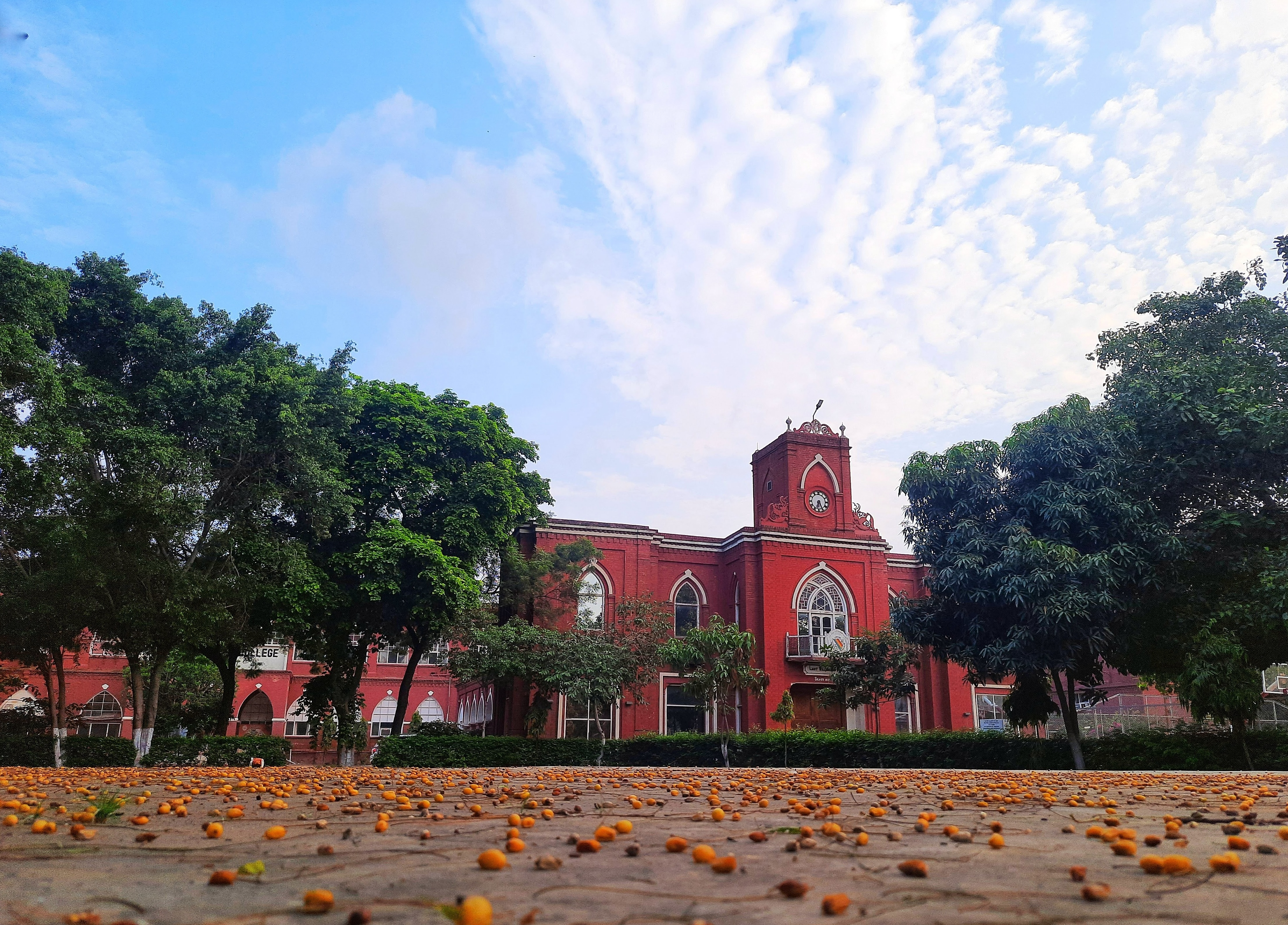
- Lady Willingdon Hall from assembly lawns
- Former names: North Indian School of Medicine for Christian Women (1894–1913), Women's Christian College (1913–1952)
- Motto: Sona Loban Mur (Gold, Frankincense and Myrrh)
- Motto in English: My Work Is for a King
- Type: Private, minority-run
- Established: 1894; 132 years ago
- Founders: Dame Edith Mary Brown, Martha Rose Greenfield and Kay Greenfield
- Affiliations: National Medical Commission
- Academic affiliations: Baba Farid University of Health Sciences
- Budget: ₹1.65 billion (US$17 million)(2021–22)
- Chairman: Dr. Sudhir Joseph
- Principal: Dr. Jeyaraj D. Pandian
- Director: Dr. William Bhatti
- Faculty: 202
- Undergraduates: 400
- Postgraduates: 180
- Doctoral students: 33
- Location: Ludhiana, Punjab, India
- Campus: 44 acres (18 ha); Urban
- Colours: Green, yellow and red
- Nickname: CMC Ludhiana
- Website: cmcludhiana.in

Christian Medical College Ludhiana, widely known as CMC Ludhiana, is a private, Christian minority-run teaching hospital and medical school in Ludhiana, India.

Founded in 1894, it was then the first medical school for women in Asia. In 1994, the world's first total face replant surgery was performed in the medical college by Abraham Thomas. First surgical research hub of India is also set up in the medical college in 2019 by National Institute for Health and Care Research. CMC Ludhiana became the first educational institution to launch telemedicine consultation with the Cleveland Clinic in 2020. The college is also the first World Health Organization designated Collaborating Centre (WHO CC) for stroke in the world.

Affiliated to Baba Farid University of Health Sciences Faridkot, it offers degrees in all major postgraduate and doctoral services along with various graduate courses in medical, dental, nursing and allied health sciences.

== History ==
=== Early days ===
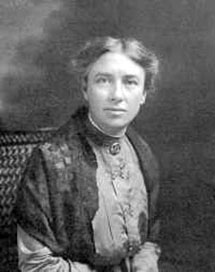
Edith Mary Brown, along with the Greenfield sisters founded North Indian School of Medicine for Christian Women, later known as Christian Medical College, Ludhiana.

Medical missionary work in Ludhiana was begun in 1881 by Scottish evangelist sisters Martha Rose Greenfield and Kay Greenfield. Dame Edith Mary Brown, a Baptist missionary joined them in 1893. The following year, they established the North Indian School of Medicine for Christian Women, the first of its kind in Asia. The name was later changed in 1913 to Women's Christian Medical College. In 1952, it was changed to Christian Medical College to enable it to admit both men and women students for the upgraded MBBS course which came into effect for its first admission from 1953. The college was affiliated with Punjab University, Chandigarh. The Medical School granted Licentiate in Medicine and Surgery diploma till 1952.

=== Modern era ===
In 1964, the Department of Medicine attained the requisite number of teachers and services to the extent that it was upgraded to train postgraduates in medicine, leading to the M.D. degree. At present the college offers degrees in all major speciality and superspeciality services and is affiliated to Baba Farid University of Health Sciences.

In 1994, micro surgeon Abraham Thomas successfully reattached the avulsed face and scalp of a nine-year-old girl, Sandeep Kaur. This achievement of world's first successful total face replant has been recognised by American College of Surgeons by incorporating it in their 100 years timeline for achievements in surgery, and in the Guinness World Records. Thomas attached the arteries, veins and nerves successfully and almost the entire face and scalp survived. The girl had near-complete recovery of the muscles of her face. Thomas is a recipient of the Dr. B. C. Roy Award in Development of Specialities category for the year 2002. The other recipients of the award in faculty are Alex Zachariah in 1990 and Tejinder Singh in 2016.

In 2021, medical interns of the college protested against the administration for an increase in the stipend amount in accordance with the government policies. The administration responded saying the institution is a charitable private institution which cannot afford central or state government stipulated stipend.

In 2022, a team of medical students came up with a device to treat epileptic seizures in a medical hackathon.

== Academics ==
The college offers Bachelor in Medicine and Surgery (MBBS), post-graduate diploma and degree medical courses (Master of Surgery (MS/MCh), Doctor of Medicine (DM), Bachelor of Science, Master of Science and doctoral degrees), Allied Health Science courses, and diploma courses in nursing and other fields, and Fellowship courses. Currently, the college is affiliated to Baba Farid University of Health Sciences and National Medical Commission (formerly known as Medical Council of India).

The undergraduate MBBS course consists of four and a half years of academics, and one year of Compulsory Rotating Medical Internship. The post-graduate diploma and degree medical courses duration is three years.

=== Organisation ===
Led by the Governing body, CMC Ludhiana has the following colleges associated with it:

1. Christian Medical College
2. Christian Dental College
3. Christian Nursing College
4. College of Physiotherapy
5. Institute of Allied Health Sciences

=== Admissions and costs ===
Admission procedure into the college is through NEET (UG) and NEET (PG), an Indian nationwide entrance examination conducted by the National Testing Agency (NTA) for admission in undergraduate and post graduate medical programs. The exam is mandatory for admission in medical programs of the college and invites over a million applicants annually.

In 2023, India Today ranked CMC at 10th for private medical colleges in the country with lowest fees. The total fee for the entire course duration of approximately ₹4 million (US$42,000) for undergraduate course.

== Rankings ==
University and college rankings

Medical – India
- NIRF (2024): 49
- India Today (2024): 31

Dental – India
- NIRF (2024): 30

The Ministry of Education, Government of India use the National Institutional Ranking Framework (NIRF) ranking methodology to rank institutions of higher education in India. Released annually, the framework uses several parameters for ranking purposes like resources, research, and stakeholder perception. NIRF ranked CMC Ludhiana 49th among medical colleges in India in 2024, and 42nd in 2023.

== Hospital services ==
The hospital provides a wide variety of services, ranging from primary peripheral care to superspecialty care. Departments and services include anaesthesia and critical care, clinical psychology, dermatology, ENT, gynaecology and obstetrics, internal medicine and specialties, ophthalmology, orthopaedics, paediatrics, psychiatry, physiotherapy, radiation therapy and surgical specialties. Superspecialty services like cardiology, cardiothoracic surgery, neurosurgery, oncology, neonatology, neurology, nephrology, paediatric surgery, plastic surgery & microsurgery and urology & transplantation and clinical hematology. The hospital's psychiatry department is combating the substance abuse crisis in Punjab. The department offers de-addiction services and has found that most patients are between 20 and 30 years old and are addicted to anything from cough syrup and heroin to cocaine and alcohol.

== Community services ==
CMC Ludhiana provides health care and education in urban and rural communities through clinics and medical camps. A dedicated Rural Health Outreach Programme (RHOP) initiative has started to provide a network of health services in the rural belts around Ludhiana in conjunction with village panchayats, local trusts and other local organisations. Clinics in surrounding villages like Lalton Kalan, Rauwal, Malsihan Bhaike, Hambran are organised and managed under this program.

== Campus ==
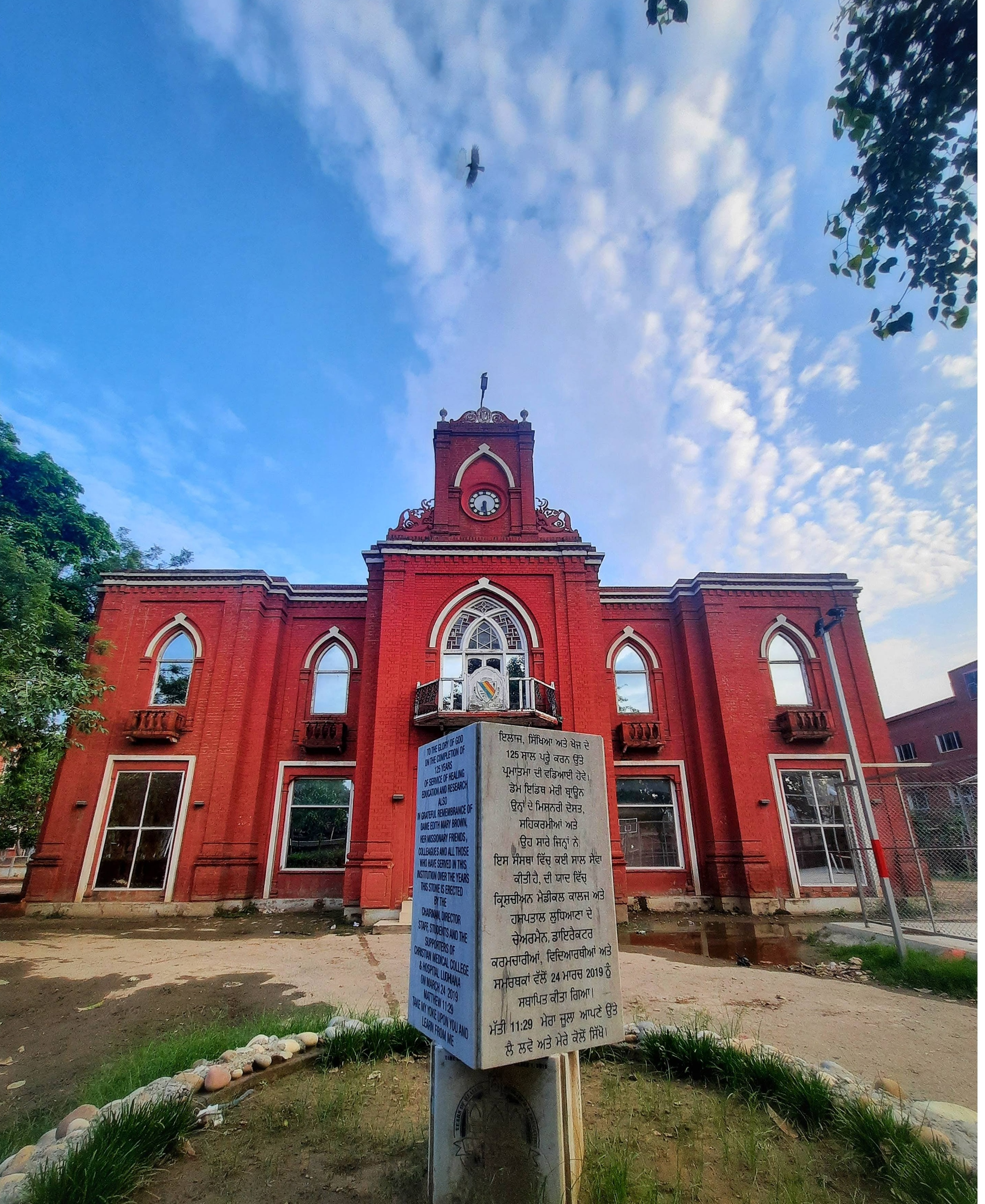
Lady Willingdon Hall and time capsule

Comprising 44 acres, the college is situated in old Ludhiana. Majority of the buildings such as college chapel and hospital block are constructed during British Raj times and are well preserved. Named after the wife of Viceroy of India Marie Freeman-Thomas, Marchioness of Willingdon, Lady Willingdon Hall is a 115-year-old red sandstone building, used regularly for meetings and various programmes.

Nobel Laureate Sir Ronald Ross visited the institution in 1902, after the discovery of malarial parasite. The boys hostel of the college is named Ross Hostel in memoriam and the residents are called Rossians.

== Research and innovations ==
=== Molecular research laboratory ===
Betty Cowan Research and Innovation Centre (BCRIC) is a molecular research laboratory started in 2010. The research lab is working on cancer stem cells and MicroRNAs in brain tumours to find potential biomarkers and molecular targets for the better management of brain tumours.

=== Surgical research hub ===
In 2019, National Institute for Health and Care Research has set up the first surgical research hub in India in CMC Ludhiana. It was set up by the Global Surgery Unit in partnership with University of Birmingham and University of Edinburgh along with the medical college to reduce the surgical site infections in India.

=== National Faculty Development and FAIMER ===
The Foundation for Advancement of International Medical Education and Research (FAIMER), USA and National Medical Commission (formerly Medical Council of India) have recognised the institution as a nodal centre for faculty development. Over a thousand faculty members from various medical colleges have been trained so far through these initiatives.

The FAIMER regional institute holds its sessions annually and enrolls 20 fellows for intensive training in educational methods and educational leadership.

=== CHRISMED Journal of Health and Research ===
A peer reviewed open access medical journal titled CHRISMED Journal of Health and Research is published by the institution quarterly.

It was started publishing in 2014 by Wolters Kluwer India and includes original articles, research reports, case reports and papers on medical, dental, nursing and allied health sciences.

== Notable alumni ==
- Abraham Thomas – plastic and microsurgeron, former director, and recipient of 2002 Dr. B. C. Roy Award
- Forrest C. Eggleston – former director

== Gallery ==
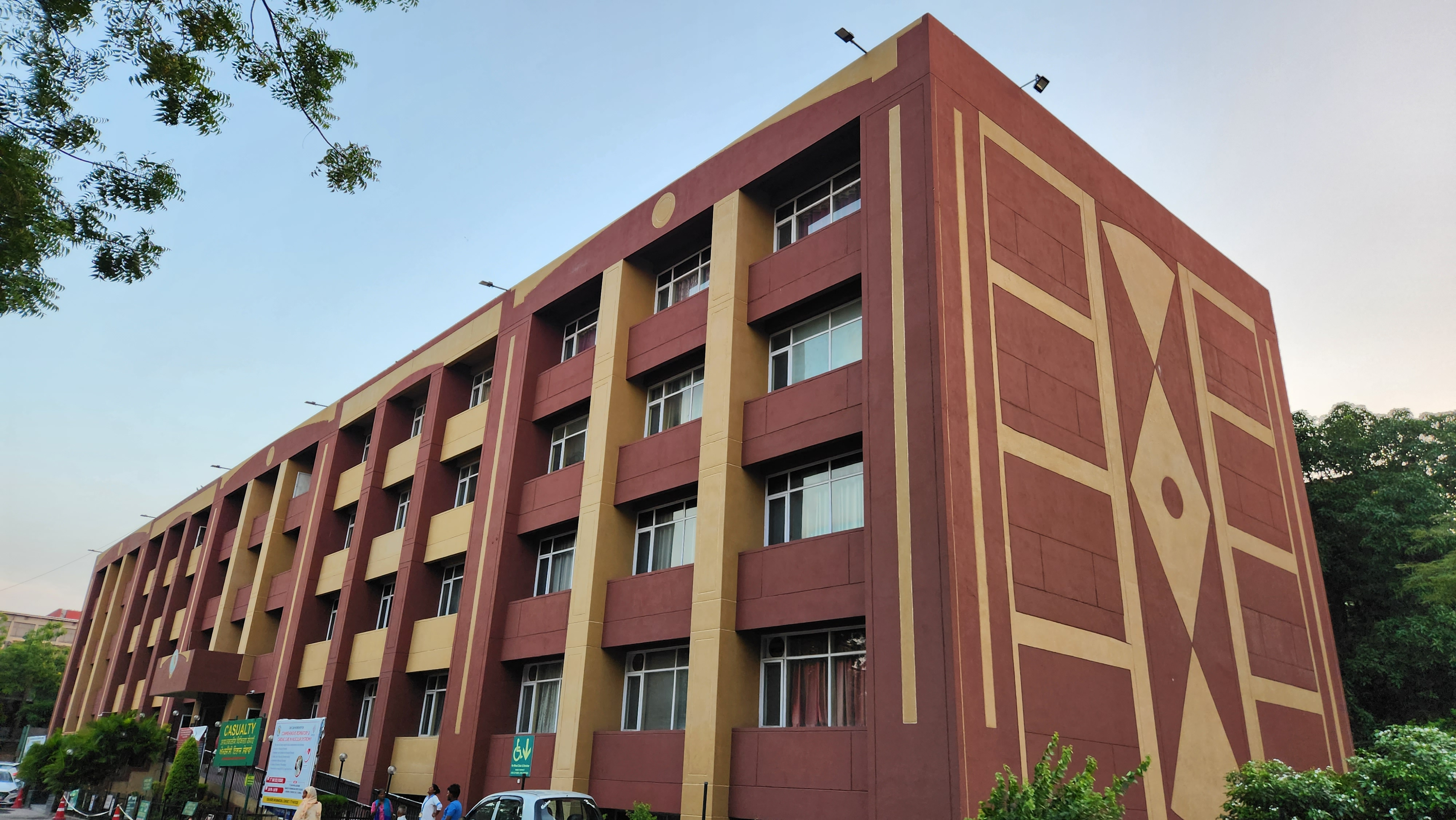
Main Hospital building

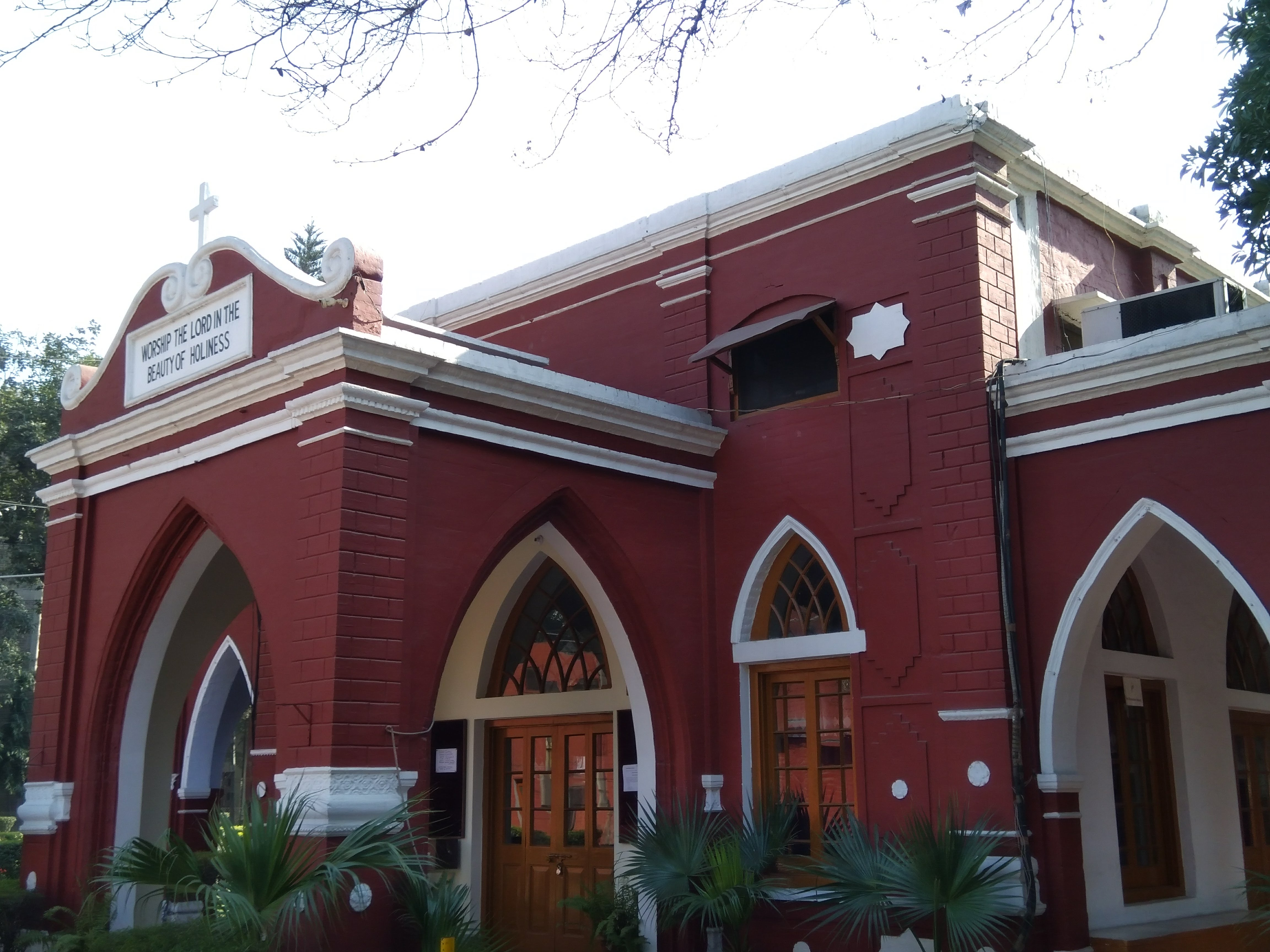
College chapel

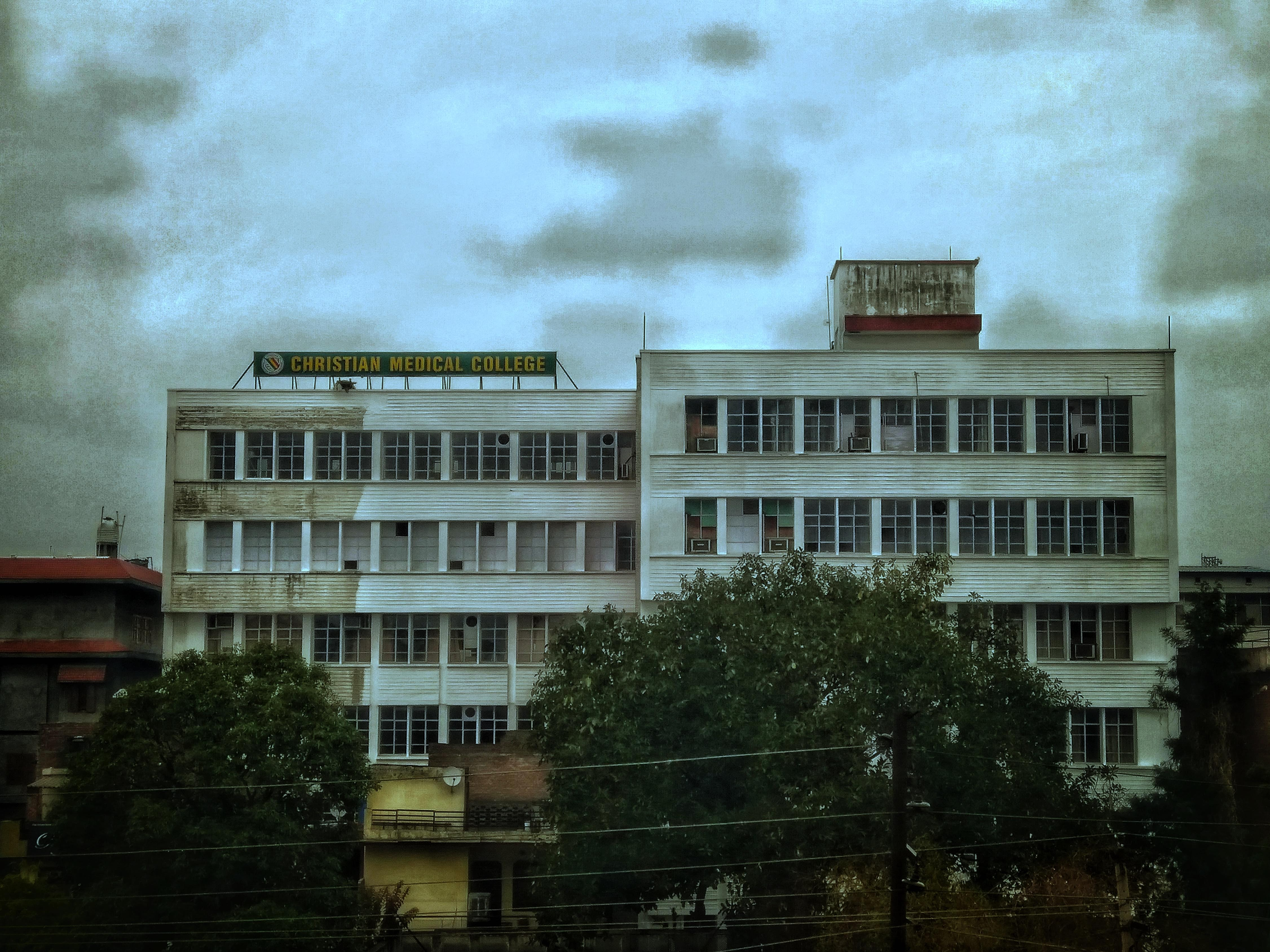
Health Sciences Block

== See also ==
- Christian Medical College & Hospital, Vellore
- Ida S. Scudder

== Bibliography ==
- Francesca French, Miss Brown's hospital: the story of the Ludhiana Medical College and Dame Edith Brown, O.B.E., its founder, London: Hodder and Stoughton, 1954.
