= Benjamin Ipavec =

Slovenian composer (1829–1908)

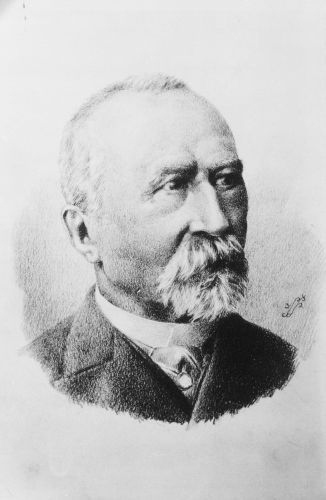
Benjamin Ipavec

Serenade for String Orchestra (1898)
First movement: Allegro moderato

"The Monk" (1907)
Lied, sung by Anton Dermota

Benjamin Ipavec (24 December 1829 – 20 December 1908) was one of the foremost Slovene Romantic composers. A native of Šentjur, he lived in that town for much of his life. He was a physician in his professional life; as a composer he wrote mainly small choral pieces for amateur forces. He wrote the first Slovene operetta, titled Tičnik. His brother Gustav and nephew Josip were both active as physicians and composers as well. His sister was poet Jeannette Ipavec Čampa. Ipavec died in Graz on 20 December 1908 and he was buried there two days later.

== See also ==
- List of Slovenian composers
