= Hrastov Dol =

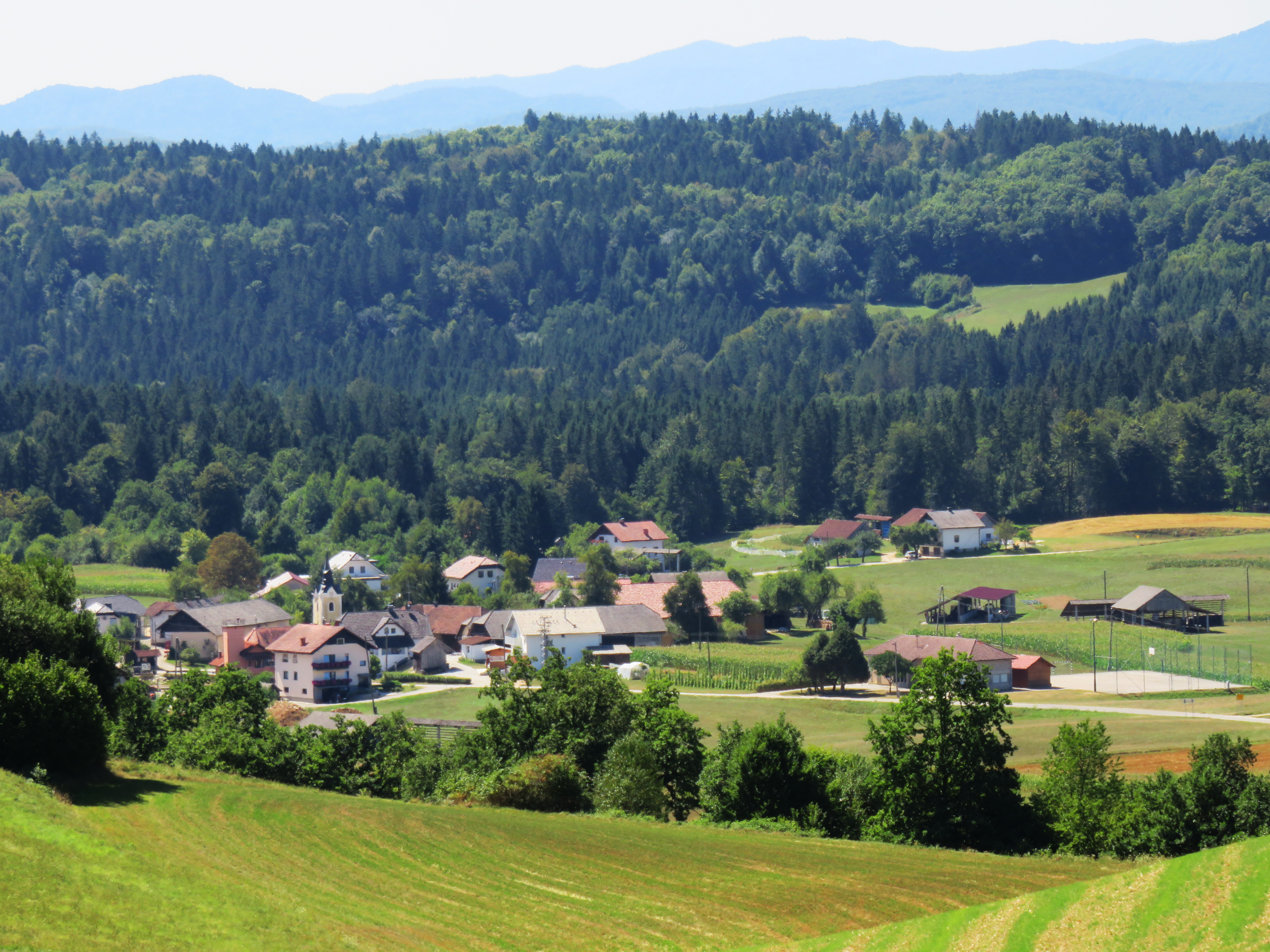

- Location in Slovenia
- Coordinates: 45°54′26.69″N 14°51′34.66″E
- Country: Slovenia
- Traditional region: Lower Carniola
- Statistical region: Central Slovenia
- Municipality: Ivančna Gorica

Area
  - Total: 1.11 km^{2} (0.43 sq mi)
- Elevation: 297.9 m (977 ft)

Population (2002)
  - Total: 105

Hrastov Dol (pronounced [ˈxɾaːstɔw ˈdoːw]) is a small village in the hills southeast of Ivančna Gorica in central Slovenia. The area is part of the historical region of Lower Carniola. The Municipality of Ivančna Gorica is now included in the Central Slovenia Statistical Region.

The parish church in the settlement is dedicated to Saint Andrew and belongs to the Parish of Šentvid pri Stični. It dates to the first half of the 16th century.
