= Abraham Thomas (surgeon) =

Indian Plastic surgeon

Abraham Gracefield Thomas (born 26 July 1950) is a plastic and reconstructive surgeon, specializing in microsurgery, from India.

== Early life ==
Dr Abraham Thomas was born in Thamarasserry, Calicut, Kerala. He completed his medical education at Christian Medical College, Ludhiana. He trained in surgery under Dr. Eggleston, Dr Feierabend and Dr Bindra. He was trained in microvascular surgery by Marko Godina, a famous microsurgeon from Yugoslavia.

== Career ==
In 1994 in Christian Medical College Ludhiana, he successfully reattached the avulsed face and scalp of a nine-year-old girl, Sandeep Kaur. This achievement has recently been recognised by American College of Surgeons by incorporating Thomas in their 100 years timeline for achievements in surgery. Thomas attached the arteries, veins and nerves successfully and almost the entire face and scalp survived. The girl had near-complete recovery of the muscles of her face. Sandeep continued her studies after recovery and she is an accomplished registered nurse at the hospital. Thomas is a recipient of the Dr. B. C. Roy Award in Development of Specialities category for the year 2002. He is presently working as vice chairman of Malabar Medical College and Research Center, Calicut.
