= Velike Pece =

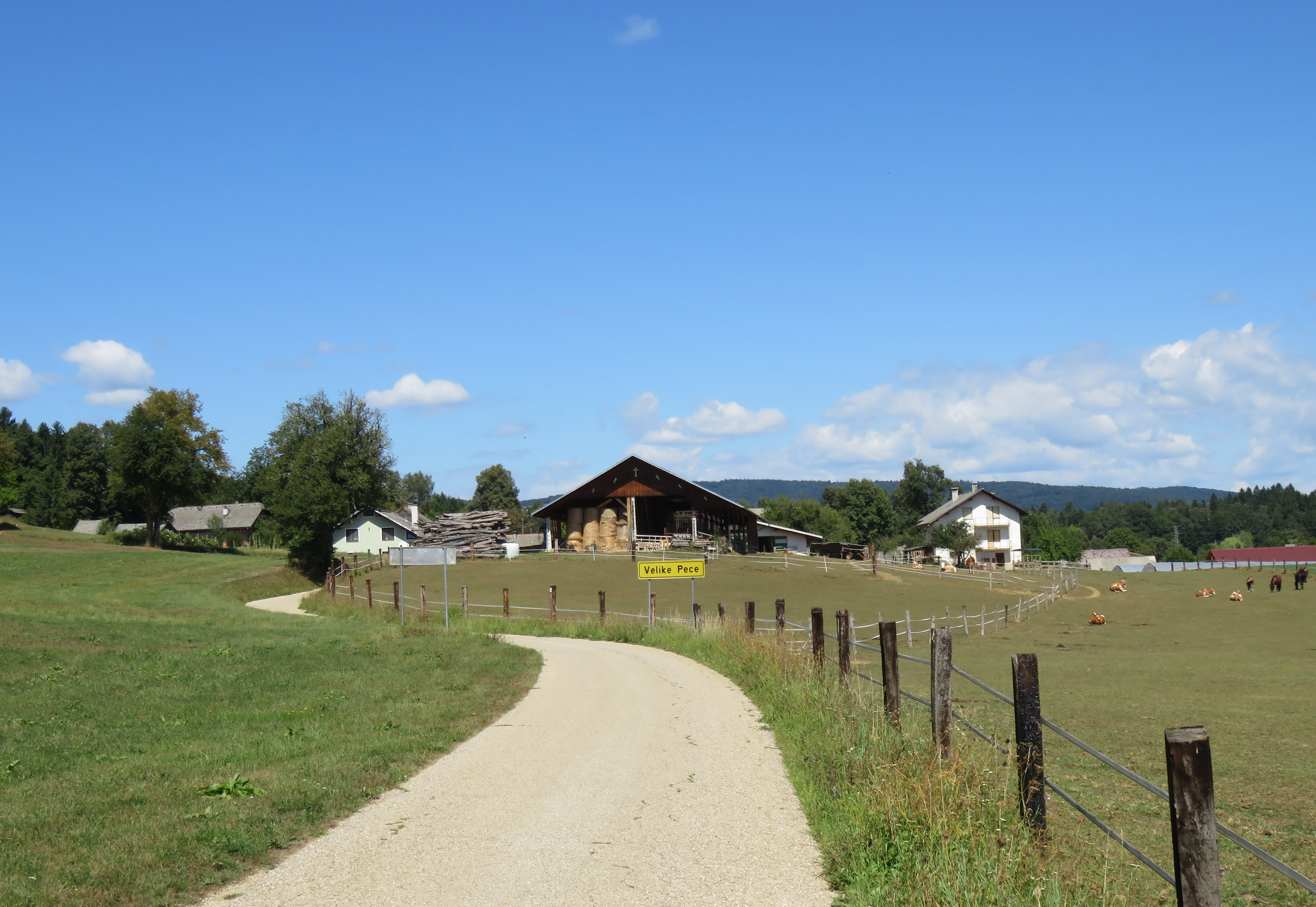

- Location in Slovenia
- Coordinates: 45°55′54.38″N 14°50′17.84″E
- Country: Slovenia
- Traditional region: Lower Carniola
- Statistical region: Central Slovenia
- Municipality: Ivančna Gorica

Area
  - Total: 2.19 km^{2} (0.85 sq mi)
- Elevation: 310.4 m (1,018 ft)

Population (2002)
  - Total: 85

Velike Pece (pronounced [ˈʋeːlikɛ ˈpeːtsɛ]; in older sources also Velike Peče, German: Großpeze) is a village in the Municipality of Ivančna Gorica in central Slovenia. The A2 Slovenian motorway runs just north of the settlement core. The area is part of the historical region of Lower Carniola. The municipality is now included in the Central Slovenia Statistical Region.

== Church ==
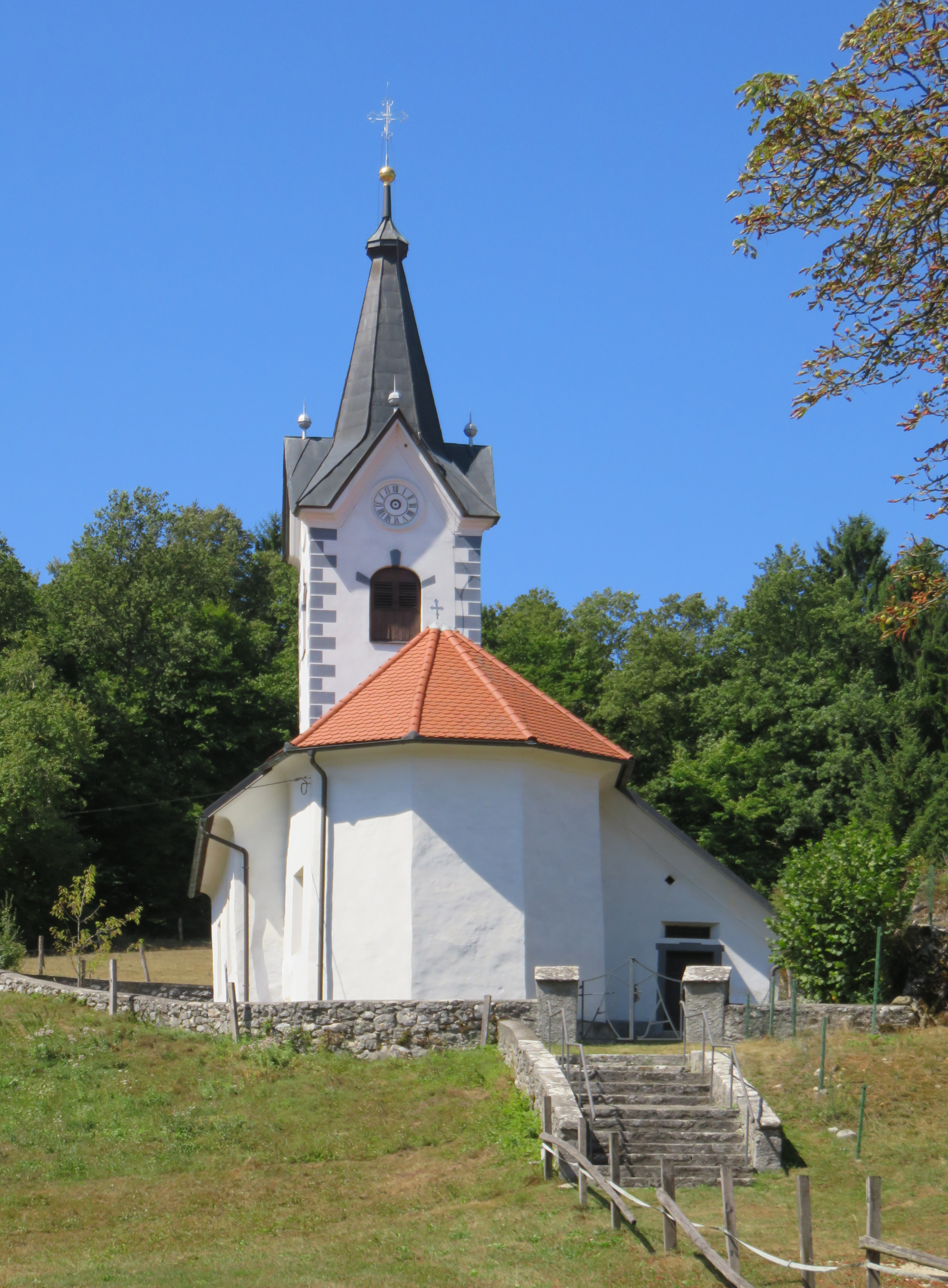
Our Lady of the Snows Church

The local church is dedicated to Our Lady of the Snows (Slovene: Marija Snežna) and belongs to the Parish of Šentvid pri Stični. It is originally a Gothic building, first mentioned in written documents dating to 1642 and heavily remodelled in the 17th and 18th centuries.
