= Male Pece =

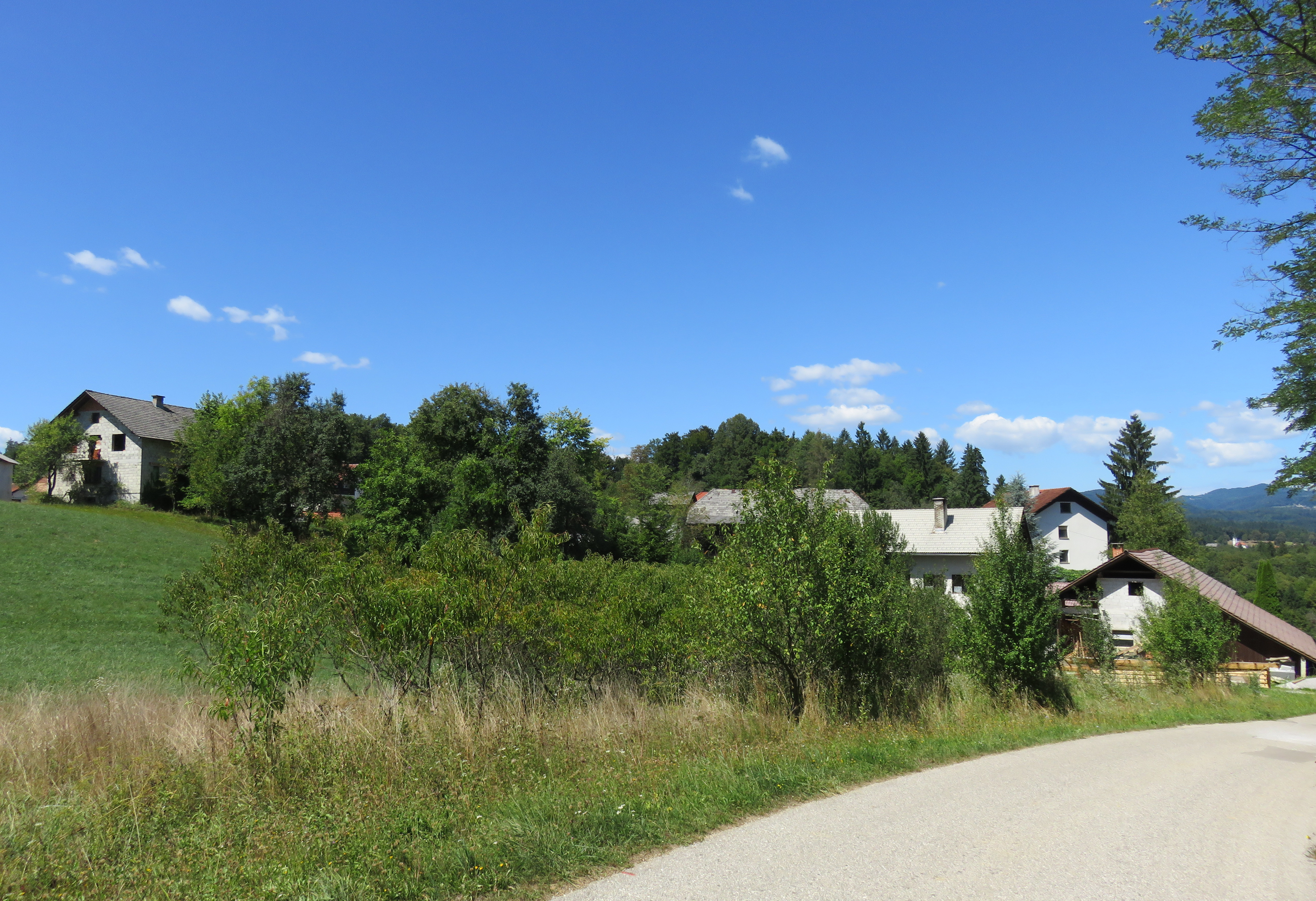

- Location in Slovenia
- Coordinates: 45°55′12.31″N 14°50′52.77″E
- Country: Slovenia
- Traditional region: Lower Carniola
- Statistical region: Central Slovenia
- Municipality: Ivančna Gorica

Area
  - Total: 2.16 km^{2} (0.83 sq mi)
- Elevation: 327.4 m (1,074 ft)

Population (2002)
  - Total: 17

Male Pece (pronounced [ˈmaːlɛ ˈpeːtsɛ]; in older sources also Male Peče, German: Kleinpeze) is a small village in the Municipality of Ivančna Gorica in central Slovenia. The area is part of the historical region of Lower Carniola. The municipality is now included in the Central Slovenia Statistical Region.

== Church ==
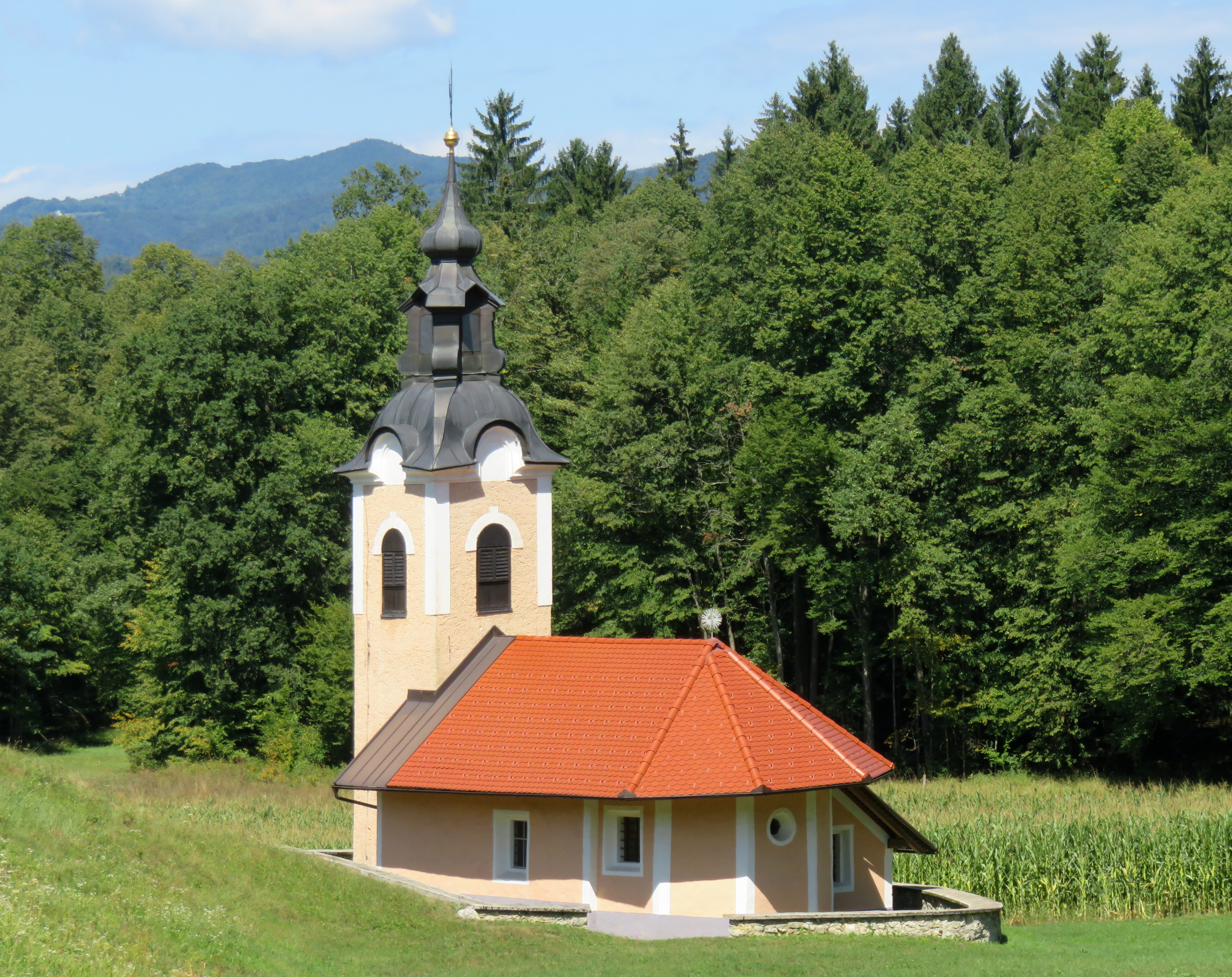
Saint Lambert's Church

The local church in the settlement is dedicated to Saint Lambert and belongs to the Parish of Šentvid pri Stični. It dates to the second quarter of the 17th century.
