= Ščuka =

Ščuka is a surname. Notable people with the surname include:

- Luka Ščuka (born 2002), Slovenian basketball player
- Viljem Ščuka (born 1938), Slovenian psychotherapist
