= Pristavlja Vas =

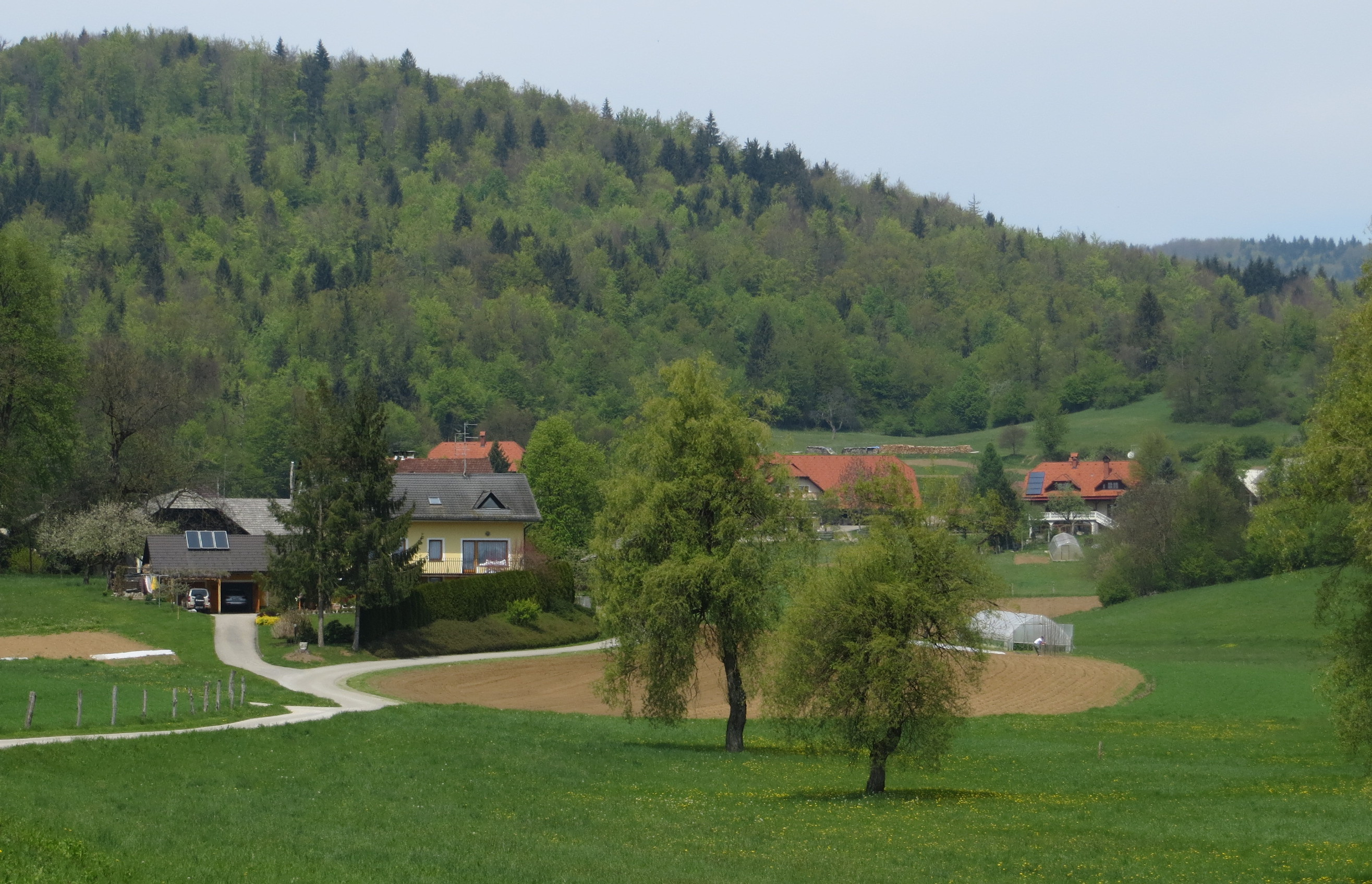

- Location in Slovenia
- Coordinates: 45°57′21.14″N 14°49′41.83″E
- Country: Slovenia
- Traditional region: Lower Carniola
- Statistical region: Central Slovenia
- Municipality: Ivančna Gorica

Area
  - Total: 0.95 km^{2} (0.37 sq mi)
- Elevation: 363 m (1,191 ft)

Population (2002)
  - Total: 49

Pristavlja Vas (pronounced [pɾiˈstaːwlja ˈʋaːs]; Slovene: Pristavlja vas) is a small settlement west of Šentvid pri Stični in the Municipality of Ivančna Gorica in central Slovenia. The area is part of the historical region of Lower Carniola. The municipality is now included in the Central Slovenia Statistical Region.

A small roadside chapel-shrine in the southern part of the settlement is dedicated to the Holy Family and was built in the late 19th century.
