= Gustav Ipavec =

Slovenian composer

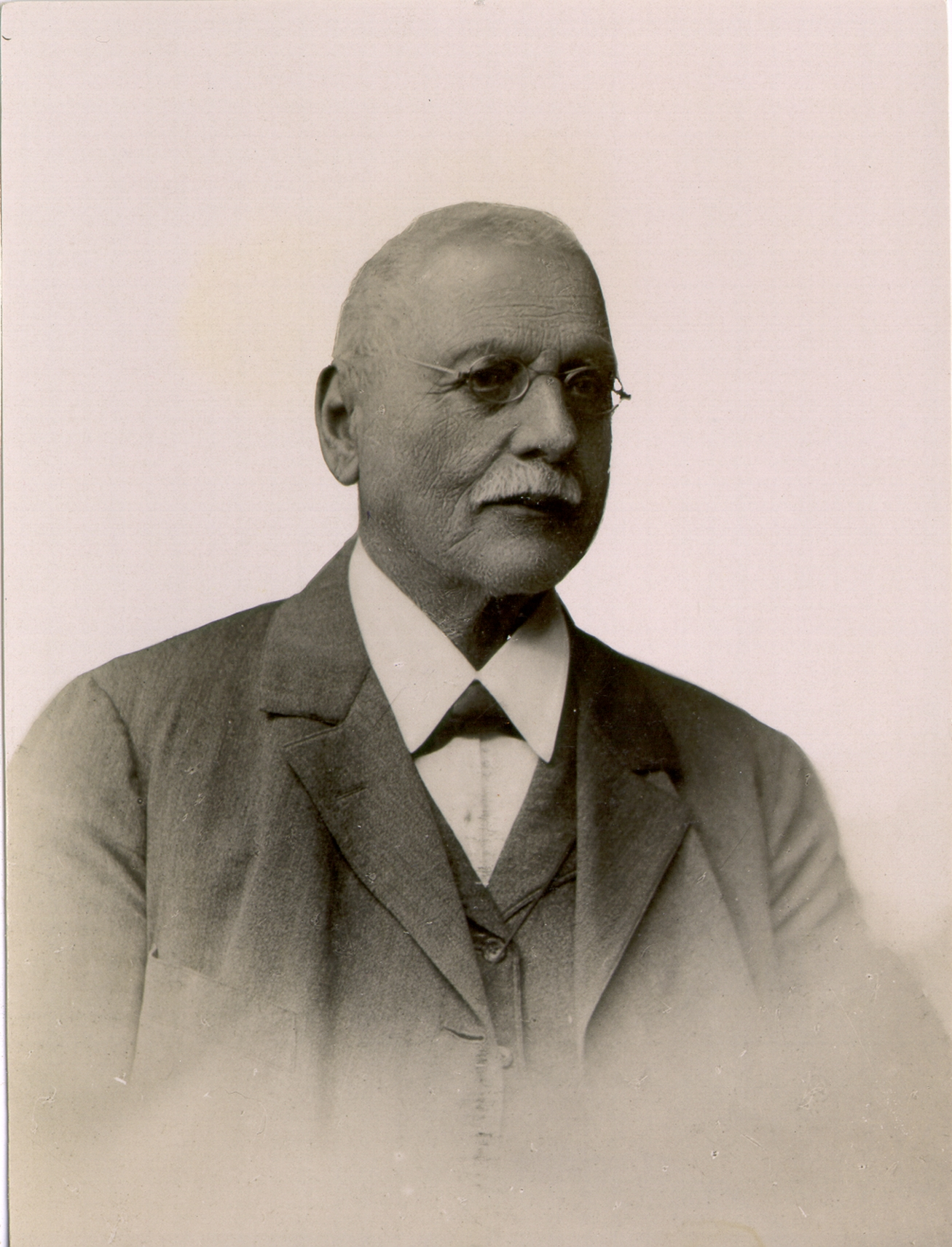
Gustav Ipavec in the 1880s.

Gustav Ipavec (15 August 1831 – 20 August 1908) was a Slovenian composer. A native of Šentjur, he lived in that town for much of his life. He was a physician in his professional life; as a composer he wrote mainly small choral pieces for amateur performers. His son was the composer and physician Josip Ipavec; his brother, Benjamin Ipavec, was also a composer and physician. His sister was poet Jeannette Ipavec Čampa.

== See also ==
- List of Slovenian composers
