= Jeannette Ipavec Čampa =

Slovenian poet (1817–1911)

- Born: Marija Ana Ivana Ipavec; 5 May 1817; Šentjur, Austrian Empire
- Died: 30 April 1911 (aged 93); Šentjur, Austria-Hungary
- Occupations: landowner, poet, choral conductor
- Children: Marija Čampa; Amalija Čampa; Fani Čampa
- Relatives: Alojz Ipavec (brother); Benjamin Ipavec (brother); Gustav Ipavec (brother); Josip Ipavec (nephew)

Marija Ana Ivana Ipavec, also known as Jeannette Ipavec Čampa and Ivanka Ipavska, (5 May 1817 – 30 April 1911) was a Slovenian landowner and poet. She was one of the first bourgeois women Slovenian-language poets. She took part in the founding of the First Austrian Ladies' Quartet, also known as the Graz Ladies' Quartet, in which three of her daughters also sang.

== Childhood ==
She was born as the second child in a Slovenian family on 5 May 1817 in Šentjur. Her father was the Slovenian physician Franc Ipavec (1776–1858) from Gradac, while her mother was the Austrian pianist and harpist Katarina Schweighofer (1794–1865) from an impoverished noble family of Vienna, who would calm patients during her husband's operations by playing the piano. She had four sisters and four brothers, of whom two sisters and one brother died in childhood. Among the surviving siblings were the composers and physicians Alojz Ipavec, Benjamin Ipavec and Gustav Ipavec. The local elite often gathered in their house for her mother’s musical recitals. She inherited musical talent from her mother and often sung or played piano with her. She was educated in Graz. There, her classmates called her die Schwester der Schneeglockchen (the sister of the snowdrops) after her brother Alojz’s waltz Schneeglöckchenwalzer (Snowdrop Waltz), which was very popular and widespread at the time. She spoke six languages: in addition to Slovene, she also knew French, Croatian, Hungarian, Latin and German. Because of her strong Francophilia, she was known as Jeannette.

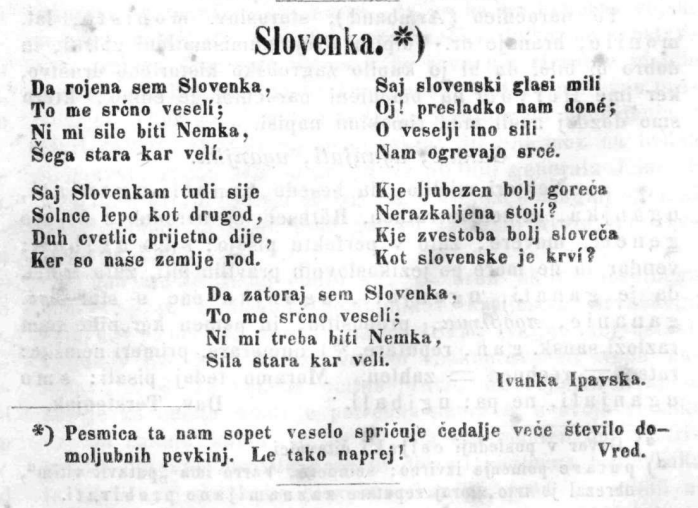
The poem Slovenka (Slovenian Woman), which Jeannette wrote in 1862 and which was published in Kmetijske in rokodelske novice.

== Work ==
She also wrote poetry. Her poems are mostly patriotic. Some of her poems were set to music by her brother Benjamin and by the composer Anton Hribar. In 1845 she married the lawyer Alojz Čampa (1817–1887) from Celje. (Note: Also known as Alois Tschampa.)

They had four daughters, among them the concert singers Marija Čampa (1847–1916) and Amalija Čampa (1848–1917), and the concert singer and music pedagogue Fani Čampa (1853–1927), as well as two sons, one of whom died in childhood and the other at the age of twenty. She taught her daughters music and singing. She was a supporting member of Glasbena matica.

In 1858, when she was living with her family in Buda, she became seriously ill, and Gustav Ipavec, who had just received his doctorate, moved in with them for several months in order to cure her. Around 1860 she inherited the family estate with the house, also known as Ipavčeva hiša (Ipavec House), where she began coming increasingly often with her family, and where the family settled permanently after her husband’s retirement.

When her daughters were children, she formed a singing quartet out of them. In 1876, her daughters Marija, Amalija and Fani, together with another girl, founded a quartet that was first known as the Graz Ladies' Quartet and later as the First Austrian Ladies' Quartet. Jeannette accompanied the quartet on concert tours across Europe.

== Later life and death ==
In old age she retired and returned to her estate. As leader of the quartet, she was succeeded by her daughter Fani. Many important guests came to her home to visit her daughters, including the composers Johannes Brahms, Wilhelm Kienzl and Oskar Nedbal. When her daughters Marija and Amalija retired around 1908, they moved in with her and cared for her until her death. Even in advanced age she remained mentally vigorous and read a great deal. She died of heart failure on the morning of 30 April 1911 in Šentjur. She was buried in the Šentjur cemetery, in the grave where her parents and her husband had already been buried before her.
