= Petrušnja Vas =

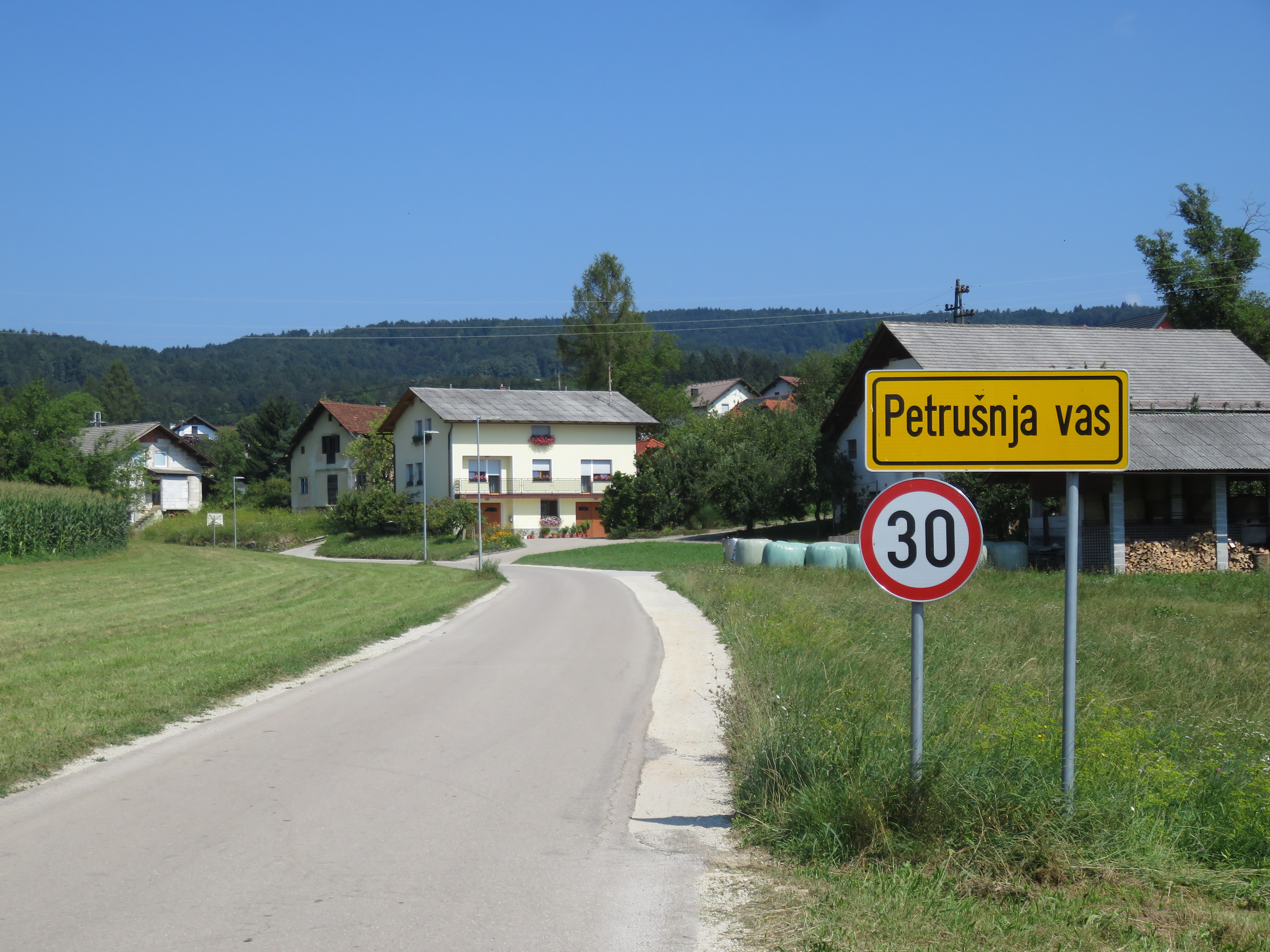

- Location in Slovenia
- Coordinates: 45°57′30.24″N 14°50′8.28″E
- Country: Slovenia
- Traditional region: Lower Carniola
- Statistical region: Central Slovenia
- Municipality: Ivančna Gorica

Area
  - Total: 1.83 km^{2} (0.71 sq mi)
- Elevation: 347.8 m (1,141 ft)

Population (2002)
  - Total: 160

Petrušnja Vas (pronounced [pɛˈtɾuːʃnja ˈʋaːs]; Slovene: Petrušnja vas) is a village just north of Šentvid pri Stični in the Municipality of Ivančna Gorica in central Slovenia. The area is part of the historical region of Lower Carniola. The municipality is now included in the Central Slovenia Statistical Region.

== Church ==
The local church is dedicated to Saint Nicholas (Slovene: sveti Miklavž) and belongs to the Parish of Šentvid pri Stični. It was first mentioned in written documents dating to 1250 and was restyled in the Baroque in the 17th century.

== Notable people ==
Notable people that were born or lived in Petrušnja Vas include:

- Jožef Jerič (1823–188), beekeeper, born in the hamlet of Gradišče
