= Dobje, Gorenja Vas–Poljane =

Dobje
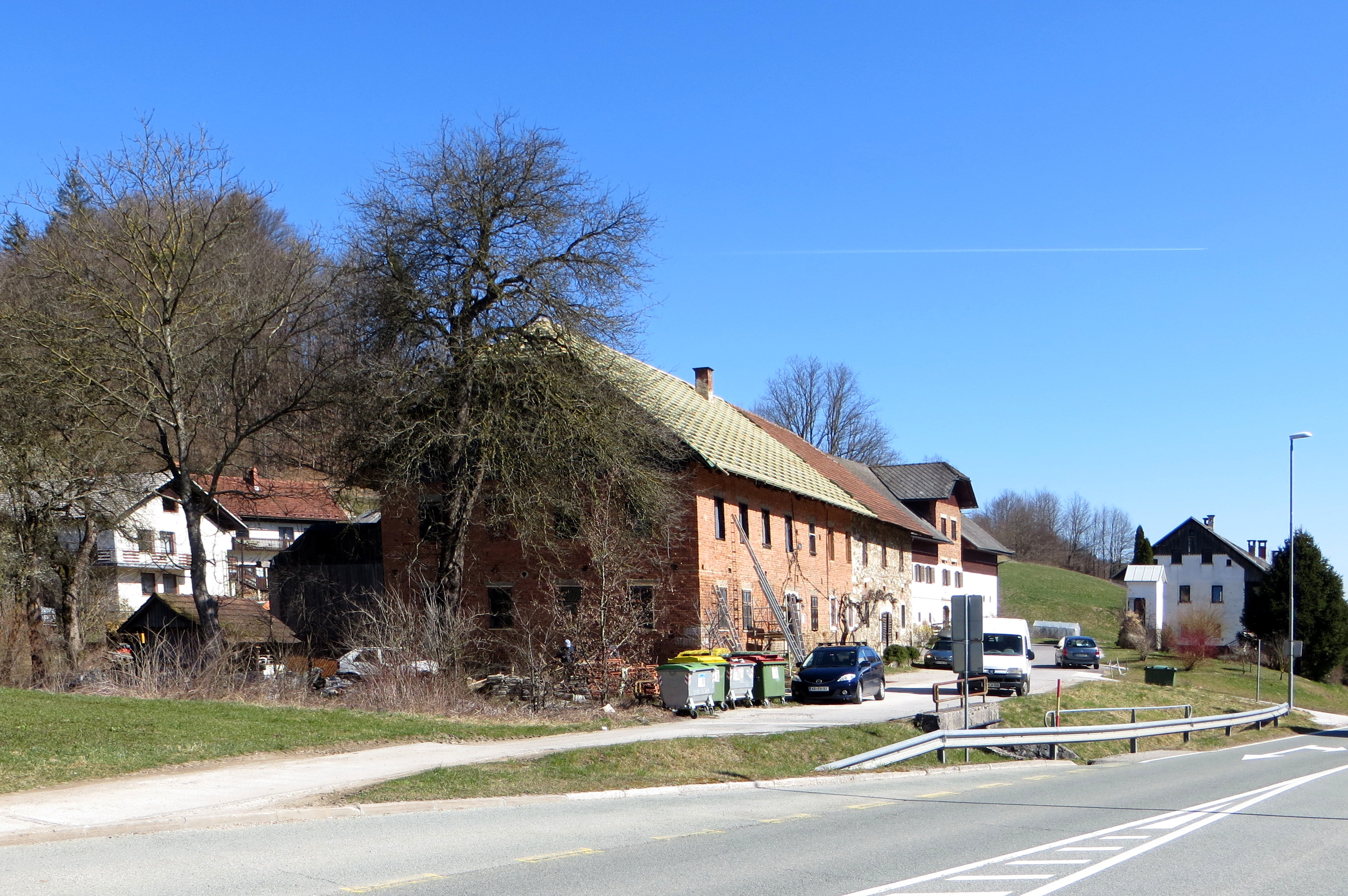

- Location in Slovenia
- Coordinates: 46°7′3.37″N 14°10′31.14″E
- Country: Slovenia
- Traditional region: Upper Carniola
- Statistical region: Upper Carniola
- Municipality: Gorenja Vas–Poljane

Area
  - Total: 0.95 km^{2} (0.37 sq mi)
- Elevation: 391.5 m (1,284 ft)

Population (2020)
  - Total: 115
  - Density: 120/km^{2} (310/sq mi)

Dobje (pronounced [ˈdoːbjɛ]; German: Dobie) is a small village in the Poljane Sora Valley in the Municipality of Gorenja Vas–Poljane in the Upper Carniola region of Slovenia.

== Notable people ==
Notable people that were born or lived in Dobje include:

- Ivan Franke (1841–1927), painter
- Valentina Kobe (1905–1998), Slovenian anatomist
