= Tabor slovenskih pevskih zborov Šentvid pri Stični =

Slovenian choral festival

Tabor slovenskih pevskih zborov Šentvid pri Stični (literally 'Meeting of Slovene Choirs'), known in English as the Slovene Choirs Meeting, is a traditional mass choral event that has been held since 1970 in Šentvid pri Stični, Slovenia. It is one of the largest choral gatherings in Slovenia and in Europe: each year, in late spring or early summer, up to 250 choirs and several thousand singers from Slovenia and from Slovene communities abroad gather on the grounds next to the local primary school and form the country's largest combined choir.

== History ==
The roots of the event go back to 1970, when Tone Kozlevčar, a member of the Slovene Octet and a native of Šentvid, invited regional choirs to his home village and thus revived the tradition of mass singing gatherings; the initiative was connected with an anniversary of the octet. In 1971 the preparatory committee decided that all choirs from Slovenia and abroad could take part, and the event was named Tabor slovenskih pevskih zborov.

Over the decades it grew into one of the largest choral events in Europe, often featuring more than a hundred choirs and several thousand singers. The 48th meeting was held in 2017 and the 50th in 2019. Because of the COVID-19 pandemic, the 2020 meeting was not held in its usual form, and in 2021 RTV Slovenia broadcast a recording of the 1992 meeting to mark the 30th anniversary of Slovenian independence. The festival then resumed, with the 51st meeting in 2022, the 52nd in 2023, the 53rd in 2024, and the 54th in 2025. In 2026 the festival adopted a renewed format based on a two-year cycle: a participatory event, Zapojmo si!, was held in May 2026, while the main mass concert, under the motto Slovenija poje ('Slovenia Sings'), is planned for 22 May 2027, with the composer and conductor Damijan Močnik as artistic director.

== Format ==
The central event is an all-day, mostly open-air concert of combined male, female, and mixed choirs; a guest choir usually performs on the eve of the main day. The concerts are regularly recorded and broadcast by RTV Slovenia. Each meeting has a guiding motto (theme) that shapes the shared repertoire.

== Significance ==
The meeting connects Slovenian choirs with choirs of Slovenes living abroad—among others from Zagreb, Rijeka, and Pula in Croatia, Gornji Senik in Hungary, and Belgrade—and thus helps to preserve Slovene song, language, and culture in Slovene minority communities beyond Slovenia's borders.

== Recognition ==
In 1994 the festival received the Silver Order of Freedom of the Republic of Slovenia.

== Mottos by year ==
The following table lists the guiding motto (theme) of the meeting by year.

Year	Guiding motto (Slovene)
1970	Kip Ribničana
1971	Marko Gerbec
1972	Stanko Vurnik
1973	Spomenik »Puntarija«
1974	France Prešeren
1975	Spomenik prvim talcem v Radohovi vasi
1977	85-letnica maršala Tita
1979	Hiša Tomaža Godca v Bohinjski Bistrici
1980	»Druže Tito, mi ti se kunemo«
1981	Ob 40-letnici OF in vstaje jugoslovanskih narodov in narodnosti
1982–1988	Pojo naj ljudje
1989	Pojo naj ljudje (120th anniversary of the Slovene tabori)
1992	Pojemo v samostojni Sloveniji
1993	Pojo naj ljudje
1994	Slovenski zemlji glas naj naš velja
1995	Pojo naj ljudje
1996	Ko pridemo na sred vasi, zavriskamo na vse strani
1997	Urno cepec izpod rok, pika, poka, pika, pok
1998–1999	Nastavi na zemljo uho, da zveš, kje izvira zlato in kje preliva srebro
2000	Hodil po zemlji sem naši: Dolenjska in Bela krajina
2001	Hodil po zemlji sem naši: Notranjska, Primorska, Benečija, Rezija
2002	Hodil po zemlji sem naši: Štajerska, Prekmurje, Porabje
2003	Hodil po zemlji sem naši: Koroška
2004	Hodil po zemlji sem naši: Gorenjska
2005	Hodil po zemlji sem naši …
2006–2007	Vezilo
2008	»Ne puite, puite vfi ludie« (archaic spelling)
2009	Kol'kor kapljic, tol'ko let
2010	So pesmi okrogle
2011	Pozdravljen, praznični dan
2012	Vse najlepše rožice
2013	Sijaj, sijaj, sončece
2014	Pod to goro zeleno
2015	Oj, lepo je res na deželi
2016	Jaz sem si pa nekaj zmislu
2017	Veselje je pri nas
2018	O kresi se dan obesi
2019	Pa se sliš' – naj se sliš'
2020	Pesem in smeh v dobrih ljudeh (postponed due to COVID-19)
2021	— (RTV Slovenia broadcast a recording of the 1992 meeting)
2022	Pusti pevcu pesem peti
2023	Pesem in smeh v dobrih ljudeh
2024	Ta šmentana ljubezen
2025	Prelepa si, naša dežela!
2026	Zapojmo si! (renewed format)
2027	Slovenija poje! (planned for 22 May 2027)

== See also ==
- Šentvid pri Stični
- Slovene Octet
