= Forrest C. Eggleston =

American surgeon (1920–2016)

Eggleston in 2011

Forrest Cary Eggleston (September 28, 1920 – November 7, 2016) was an American surgeon who served as the head of the surgery department of Christian Medical College, Ludhiana for 28 years, training 110 surgeons over his career.

Eggleston was born in New York City to Cary and May (née Parker) Eggleston on September 28, 1920. Graduating from Princeton University, he gained his MD in 1945 from Cornell University Medical College. He then trained first in general surgery and then in cardiothoracic surgery. He worked in different hospitals in New York until December 1953 and then moved to India to work as a missionary training doctors in the field of surgery.

Originally working in a small town in Himachal Pradesh, he began work as a professor at the Christian Medical College in Ludhiana in 1955, where he would spend the remaining 33 years of his career. In 1960 he established the school's Department of Surgery, where he would train 110 surgeons over his career. Eggleston became the founder president of the Northern Chapter of the Association of Surgeons of India in 1977. He served as director for the college between 1982 and 1986. In 1986 he retired from his position and left India. The college dedicated a library in his name in 2002.

Following his retirement, Eggleston started several foundations for the treatment of AIDS. He received the Woodrow Wilson Award from Princeton University in 2000.

Dr. Eggleston died on November 7, 2016 in a retirement home in Mechanicsburg, Pennsylvania.

== Bibliography ==
- Christian Medical College, Ludhiana : a 33 year experience 1953-1986 : a personal perspective. Ludhiana, India. 1986. OCLC 15321574.
- Where is God not? an American surgeon in India. Providence House Publishers. 1999. ISBN 978-1-57736-138-1.
