= Edith Mary Brown =

British medical doctor and Christian missionary to India

Dame Edith Brown DBE LRCP
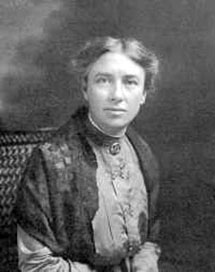
- Born: Edith Mary Brown; 24 March 1864; Whitehaven, Cumberland, England
- Died: 6 December 1956 (aged 92); Srinagar, Jammu and Kashmir, India
- Education: Girton College, Cambridge; London School of Medicine for Women
- Occupations: Medical doctor and educator
- Years active: Christian Medical College Ludhiana

Dame Edith Mary Brown DBE LRCP (24 March 1864 – 6 December 1956) was an English doctor and medical educator. She founded the Christian Medical College Ludhiana in 1894, the first medical training facility for women in Asia, and served as principal of the college for half a century. Brown was a pioneer in the instruction of Indian female doctors and midwives with modern western methods.

== Early life and education ==
Brown was born on 24 March 1864 in Whitehaven, Cumberland, England, to George Wightman Brown, a bank manager, and his second wife, Mary (née Walther). She was one of six children in the family, and the second daughter born to Mary.

Brown began her education at Manchester High School for Girls, an independent school in Manchester, Lancashire, before moving to Croydon High School, an all-girls independent school in London. Having won a scholarship, she studied natural sciences at Girton College, Cambridge. She took second class honours in 1885, within the first years that women were allowed to sit the honours exams at Cambridge.

An older sister was a missionary, which led to Brown developing an interest in medicine and missionary work. She started her career as science teacher at Exeter High School for Girls, before being offered financial support by the Baptist Mission Society to study medicine. She then entered the London School of Medicine for Women, and went on to graduate with the Scottish Triple Qualification in 1891; the Licentiate of the Royal College of Physicians of Edinburgh, the Licentiate of the Royal College of Surgeons of Edinburgh, and the Licentiate of the Royal College of Physicians and Surgeons of Glasgow.

== Career and missionary work ==
The Baptist Missionary Society sent Brown to Bombay, where she arrived on 9 November 1891. She was shocked by medical conditions in India and felt a need to educate women, particularly midwives.

"At that time by age-long tradition the orthodox Hindu woman would on no account have the services of a medical man, whether trained in modern or in the ancient systems of medicine followed in India; she was dependent for help in her confinement on the services of the superstitious dai or nurse, who was always of low caste and, from a surgical point of view, unbelievably dirty. Trained Indian women doctors or nurses were almost unknown, and throughout the peninsula only one or two women's hospitals existed."

— The Times, Obituary of Dame Edith Mary Brown, 10 December 1956

After two years with various missions, Brown set out on her own. In January 1894, a woman in Bristol donated £50 (£5,619 today) to help Brown rent an old schoolhouse in Ludhiana, Punjab. She organised a Christian medical training center for women, the North India School of Medicine for Christian Women, starting with four students and four faculty.

The medical school, the first for women in India, grew into a full college with medical, nursing and pharmacy schools, and a hospital with 200 beds. The college was supported by significant grants from the Punjab governments, as well as women's auxiliaries in London, Edinburgh, Glasgow as well as Australia, Canada, the United States and New Zealand. The school was renamed Christian Medical College Ludhiana in 1911, though it had opened its doors to non-Christians since 1909.

During the partition of British India in 1947, Punjab was split between India and Pakistan, resulting in massacres of thousands in Ludhiana. Many Muslim employees of the college and hospital fled for Pakistan, while Sikh and Hindu refugees arrived over the border. Despite the violence, the college and hospital remained safe from attack. The hospital became an emergency centre for the seriously injured.

By November 1951, on the 50th anniversary of Brown's arrival in India, the college had graduated 411 doctors, 143 nurses, 168 pharmacy dispensers and more than 1,000 midwives. Brown retired as principal in 1952 and moved to Kashmir.

== Damehood ==
In the 1932 New Year Honours, Brown was made a Dame Commander of the Order of the British Empire.

== Death ==
Brown died 6 December 1956 on her houseboat in Srinagar, India, aged 92.

== Bibliography ==
- Francesca French, Miss Brown's hospital: the story of the Ludhiana Medical College and Dame Edith Brown, D.B.E., its founder, London: Hodder and Stoughton, 1954.
- Pat Barr, The Memsahibs; The Women of Victorian India. New Delhi: Allied Publishers, 1976
