= Boris Kobe =

Slowenischer Architekt, Designer und Maler

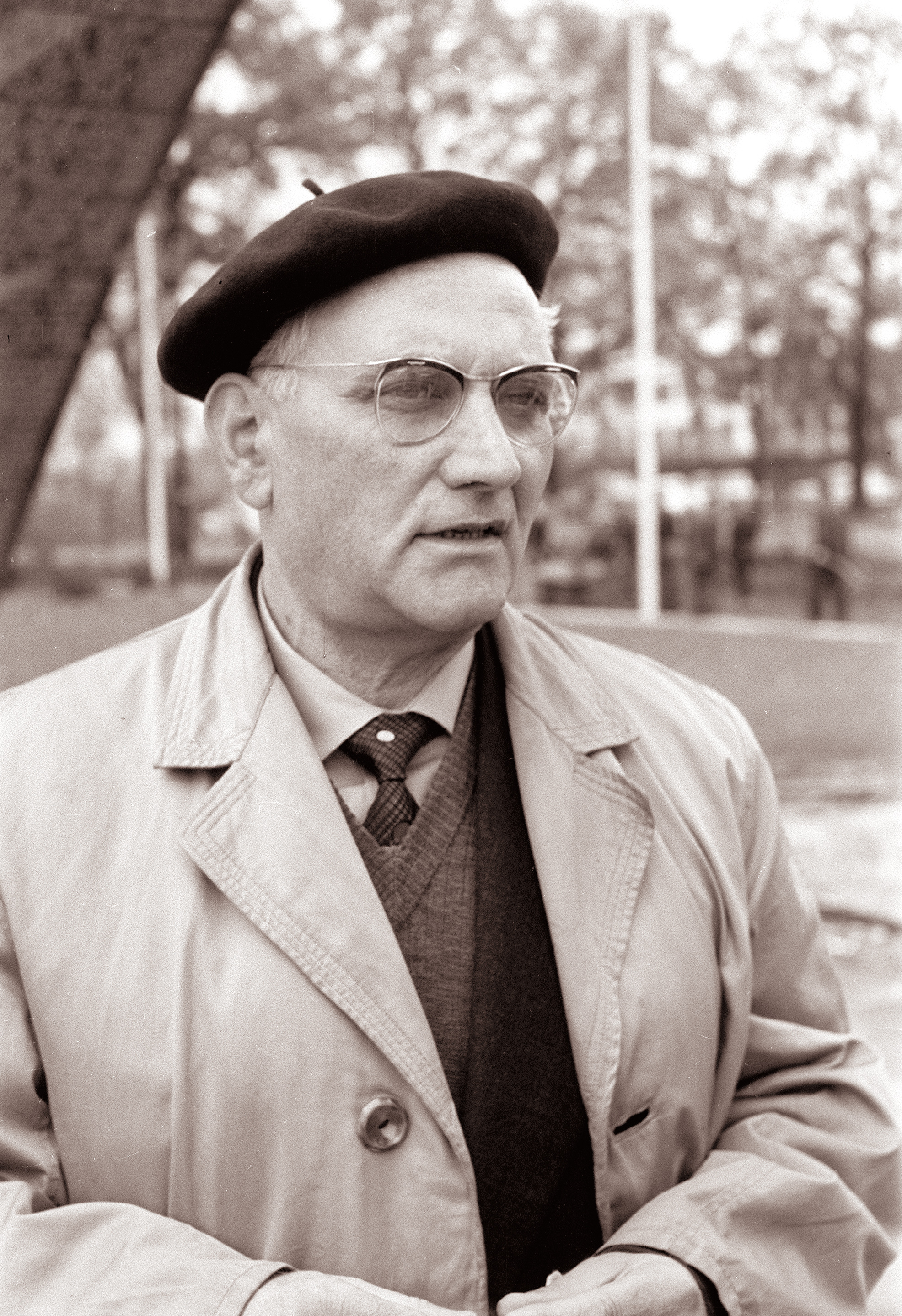
- Kobe in 1961
- Born: 9 October 1905; Ljubljana, Slovenia
- Died: 3 May 1981 (aged 75)
- Education: University of Ljubljana Technical Faculty, Department of Architecture
- Known for: architecture, painting and illustrating
- Notable work: Architecture, painting and illustration
- Spouse: Valentina Kobe
- Awards: Levstik Award; 1952 for Visoška kronika Prešeren Award; 1977 for his architecture, paintings and designs

Boris Kobe (9 October 1905 – 3 May 1981) was a Slovene architect, painter, and designer.

Kobe was born in Ljubljana in 1905. He studied art at the Department of Architecture at what was then the University of Ljubljana Technical Faculty under Jože Plečnik and graduated in 1929. He married the anatomist Valentina Grošlj with whom he would have five children. During the Second World War he was imprisoned in the Allach concentration camp. After the war he worked as an architect, painter, and designer in Ljubljana. He died in 1981. In the early 1940s, he arranged the area around Tivoli Pond and the children's playground next to it.

== Awards ==
He received the Prešeren Award for his architecture, paintings, and designs in 1977. He won the Levstik Award for his illustrations of Ivan Tavčar's Visoška kronika (The Visoko Chronicles) in 1952.
