= Marko Gerbec =

Carniolan physician (1658–1718)

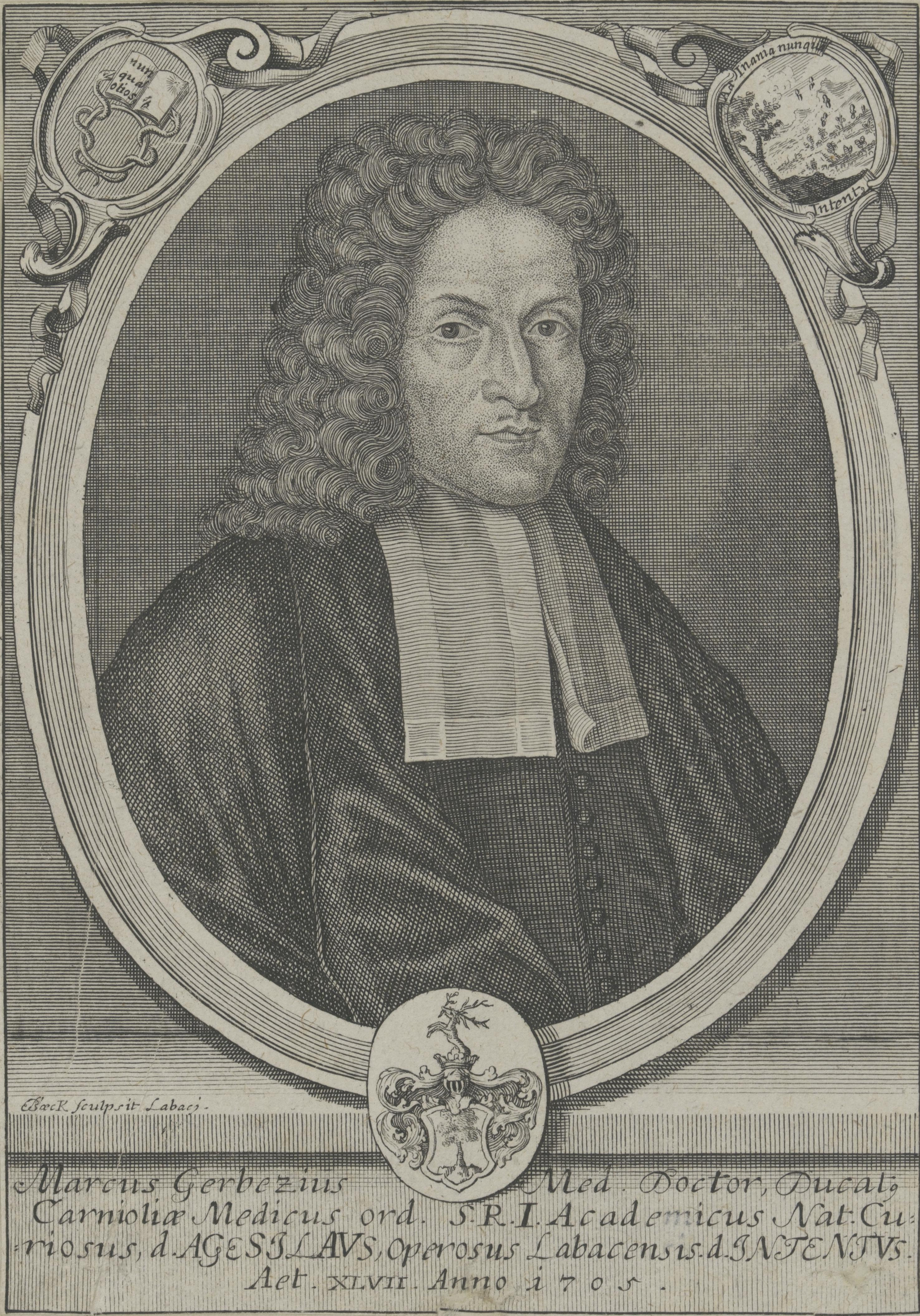
- Born: 24 October 1658; Šentvid pri Stični, Duchy of Carniola, Austrian Circle (now in Slovenia)
- Died: 9 March 1718 (aged 59); Ljubljana
- Known for: first description of Adams–Stokes syndrome
- Scientific career
- Fields: physician, scientist

Marko Gerbec (24 October 1658 – 9 March 1718; Latinized: Marcus Gerbezius) was a Carniolan physician and scientist, notable as the founder of modern medicine among the Slovenes and for the first description of Adams–Stokes syndrome. It was published in 1717 and, 44 years after its publication, it was quoted by Giovanni Battista Morgagni.

== Early life and education ==
Marko Gerbec was born in Šentvid pri Stični (then part of the Duchy of Carniola, now in Slovenia) to the family of a serf. After graduating from the Jesuit college in Ljubljana (Laibach), he studied with the help of a government scholarship—first philosophy in Laibach (now Ljubljana), then medicine in Vienna. Just a few days before the arrival of the Ottoman Army at Vienna in 1683, he left the city for Padua. He finished his studies in 1684 at Bologna. One of his professors there was Marcello Malpighi.

== Work and recognitions ==
Gerbec was an internationally recognized physician. In 1688, he became a member of the German Academia Cesarea Leopoldina. In 1693, he was among the founders of the Academia Operosorum Labacensium in Ljubljana. This was the first scientific academy in the territory of what is now Slovenia. From 1712 to 1713, he was its president. In 1712, he also founded the first scholarly society of physicians and surgeons in Carniola, named the College of Saints Cosmas and Damian (Slovenized: bratovščina sv. Kozma in Damjana). As member of the nobilis forolensis, Gerbec is described on a memorial tablet at Padua.
