= Valentina Kobe =

Slovenian anatomist and academic

- Kobe
- Born: Valentina Grošelj; 14 February 1905; Dobje, Gorenja Vas–Poljane, Upper Carniola, Austria-Hungary
- Died: 28 September 1998 (aged 93); Ljubljana, Slovenia
- Other names: Valentina Kobetova
- Occupations: Anatomist and academic
- Years active: 1929–1971

Valentina Kobe (14 February 1905 – 28 September 1998) was a Slovenian academic and anatomist. She was the first woman to become an assistant professor in the medical faculty at the University of Ljubljana. She became one of the leading anatomists in Yugoslavia and initiated the founding of the Yugoslavian Association of Anatomists. From 1948 to 1971, she was the head of the Anatomy Institute at the medical school of the University of Ljubljana. The textbooks she wrote are still in print and helped to standardize anatomical language for Slovenia. The university awards a prize in her name.

== Early life and education ==
Valentina Grošelj was born on Valentine's Day in 1905 in Dobje, in the Poljane Valley of Upper Carniola in Austria-Hungary. Her father, Alojz Grošelj, was a progressive mayor, who pressed for better schools and brought electricity to the valley. Valentina was the youngest child in the well-to-do family of landowners. She was encouraged in her wish to become a doctor and sent to Ljubljana to attend the real gymnasium, a school for ten to eighteen year old pupils. The secondary school focused on literature, modern languages, and history, rather than sciences. Although Latin studies were included, Greek was not taught. At the time, only about five percent of students attended secondary education, and she was the only woman in her class. Because she had not studied Latin, Grošelj was unable to enroll at the realka, a type of secondary schooling focused on math and science. Instead, she enrolled in art history courses, studied Latin and attended medical lectures. After completing four semesters and the first medical course, she transferred to the University of Innsbruck, from where she graduated with honors in 1929.

== Career ==
Although Grošelj wanted to specialize in obstetrics and gynaecology, there were no placements available to women at that time. She began working as an assistant in the pathology department at the University of Ljubljana in 1929. While she was at secondary school, Grošelj met Boris Kobe, who she would marry. He graduated from university with an engineering degree in Ljubljana in 1929 and then studied abroad in Paris in 1930 and 1931. After he returned, Boris began teaching drawing in the architecture faculty, under Jože Plečnik. Grošelj was studying with and working at that time as an assistant to Plečnik's brother Janez, who was the head of the Anatomy Institute. She passed her specialist examination in 1934 at the University of Belgrade and then returned to Ljubljana, where she lectured and prepared anatomical samples and models to be used in instruction. She was appointed as the first woman to be an assistant professor in the medical faculty at the University of Ljubljana in 1938.

During World War II, the university and Anatomy Institute were closed. Although she supported the activities of the Liberation Front of the Slovene Nation, of which her husband was a member, Kobe was unable to participate in their activities as she was pregnant with twins, but she organized medical aid and clandestine medical help for partisans. Boris was arrested for his protests against the Axis powers' occupation and imprisoned in Dachau in February 1945. He was transferred to the Aufkirch sub-camp near Überlingen and then in April, sent to the Allach concentration camp near Munich. The camp was liberated at the end of that month and Boris returned home to resume his career as a sculptor and architect. Kobe returned to the university that year, working as an assistant to Milan Cunder, who had taken over as the head of the Anatomy Institute, upon Plečnik's death in 1940. In 1948, Cunder was arrested because he had criticized and said he wanted to quit the Communist Party. He was purged from the party and sent to prison for four years, leaving Kobe as the sole instructor at the Anatomy Institute until 1960.

In addition to lecturing, Kobe wrote, with colleagues, a five volume textbook on anatomy which standardized anatomical terms in the Slovene language. It has been reprinted numerous times and is still in publication. Along with professor Anton Širco she produced instructional films which showed the topography and sections of the heart, abdominal organs, and brain. She was the driving force behind the creation of the Yugoslavian Association of Anatomists and served as the first president of the organization. In 1968, Kobe became a full professor and worked until her retirement in 1971.

== Death and legacy ==
Kobe died on 28 September 1998 in Ljubljana. She is remembered as a leading anatomist for Slovenia and Yugoslavia. Among the notable students she taught were Alenka Dekleva, Ivan Franc Lenart, Anton Širca, and Maja Velepič. The Valentina Kobe Prize is given by the University of Ljubljana to honor excellence in promoting medical or dental studies.

== Selected works ==
- Kobe, Valentina; Dekleva, Alenka; Lenart, Ivan F.; Širca, Anton; Velepič, Marija (1965). Anatomija: skripta za študente medicine [Anatomy: A Script for Medical Students] (in Slovenian). Vol. 1. Uvod, osteologia, syndesmologia, myologia [1. Physiotherapy, Osteology, Syndesmology, Myology]. Ljubljana, Slovenia: Medicinska fakulteta, University of Ljubljana. OCLC 442461014.
- Kobe, Valentina; Dekleva, Alenka; Lenart, Ivan F.; Širca, Anton; Velepič, Marija (1965). Anatomija: skripta za študente medicine [Anatomy: A Script for Medical Students] (in Slovenian). Vol. 2. Angiologia, splanchnologia [2. Angiology, Splanchnology]. Ljubljana, Slovenia: Medicinska fakulteta, University of Ljubljana. OCLC 449888181.
- Kobe, Valentina; Dekleva, Alenka; Lenart, Ivan F.; Širca, Anton; Velepič, Marija (1965). Anatomija: skripta za študente medicine [Anatomy: A Script for Medical Students] (in Slovenian). Vol. 3. Systema nervosum, organa sensuum [3. The Nervous System, the Organs of the Senses]. Ljubljana, Slovenia: Medicinska fakulteta, University of Ljubljana. OCLC 1051704021.
- Kobe, Valentina; Dekleva, Alenka; Lenart, Ivan F.; Širca, Anton; Velepič, Marija (2003). Anatomija: skripta za študente medicine [Anatomy: A Script for Medical Students] (in Slovenian). Vol. 4. Drobje, koža [4. Offal, Skin] (6th ed.). Ljubljana, Slovenia: Medicinska fakulteta, University of Ljubljana. ISBN 978-961-90305-9-2.
- Kobe, Valentina; Dekleva, Alenka; Lenart, Ivan F.; Širca, Anton; Velepič, Marija; Smerdu, Vika (2021). Anatomija: skripta za študente medicine [Anatomy: A Script for Medical Students] (in Slovenian). Vol. 4. Notranji organi in koža [4. Internal Organs and Skin] (8th ed.). Ljubljana, Slovenia: Medicinska fakulteta, University of Ljubljana. ISBN 978-961-267-210-2.
