= Baptist World Mission =

Baptist World Mission (BWM) is an independent, Baptist missionary agency located at 201 Gordon Drive SW in Decatur, Alabama; it also has a center in New Brunswick, Canada.

BWM was established in 1961 in Chicago.

In 2021, they had a recorded income of approximately $260,000.

In 2023, BWM has more than 240 missionaries in 49 countries worldwide, and over 4,000 churches and individuals who financially support them.

== Sources ==
- BWM official website, History, archived
- BWM official website, History, archived
