= Rauwal =

- Village
- Country: India
- State: Punjab
- District: Gurdaspur
- Tehsil: Kahnuwan
- Region: Majha

Government
  - Type: Panchayat raj
  - Body: Gram panchayat

Area
  - Total: 320 ha (790 acres)

Population (2011)
  - Total: 1,236; 648/588 ♂/♀
  - Scheduled Castes: 215; 124/91 ♂/♀
  - Total Households: 245

Languages
  - Official: Punjabi
- Time zone: UTC+5:30 (IST)
- Telephone: 01871
- ISO 3166 code: IN-PB
- Website: gurdaspur.nic.in

Rauwal is a village in Dera Baba Nanak in Gurdaspur district of Punjab State, India. It is located 13 kilometres (8.1 mi) from sub district headquarter and 40 kilometres (25 mi) from district headquarter. The village is administrated by Sarpanch an elected representative of the village.

== Demography ==
As of 2011, the village has a total number of 245 houses and a population of 1236 of which 648 are males while 588 are females. According to the report published by Census India in 2011, out of the total population of the village 215 people are from Schedule Caste and the village does not have any Schedule Tribe population so far.

== See also ==
- List of villages in India
