= Alojz Ipavec =

Slovenian composer

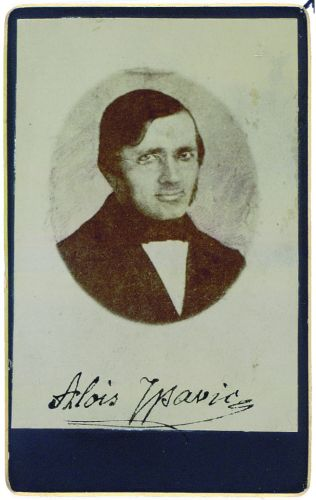
Alojz Ipavec

Alojz Ipavec, also written as Lojze Ipavic (20 May 1815 – 1849), was a Slovenian composer. In his professional life, he was a physician; as a composer, he is remembered primarily for a handful of small salon pieces. His sisteer was poet Jeannette Ipavec Čampa.

== See also ==
- List of Slovenian composers
