= Viljem Ščuka =

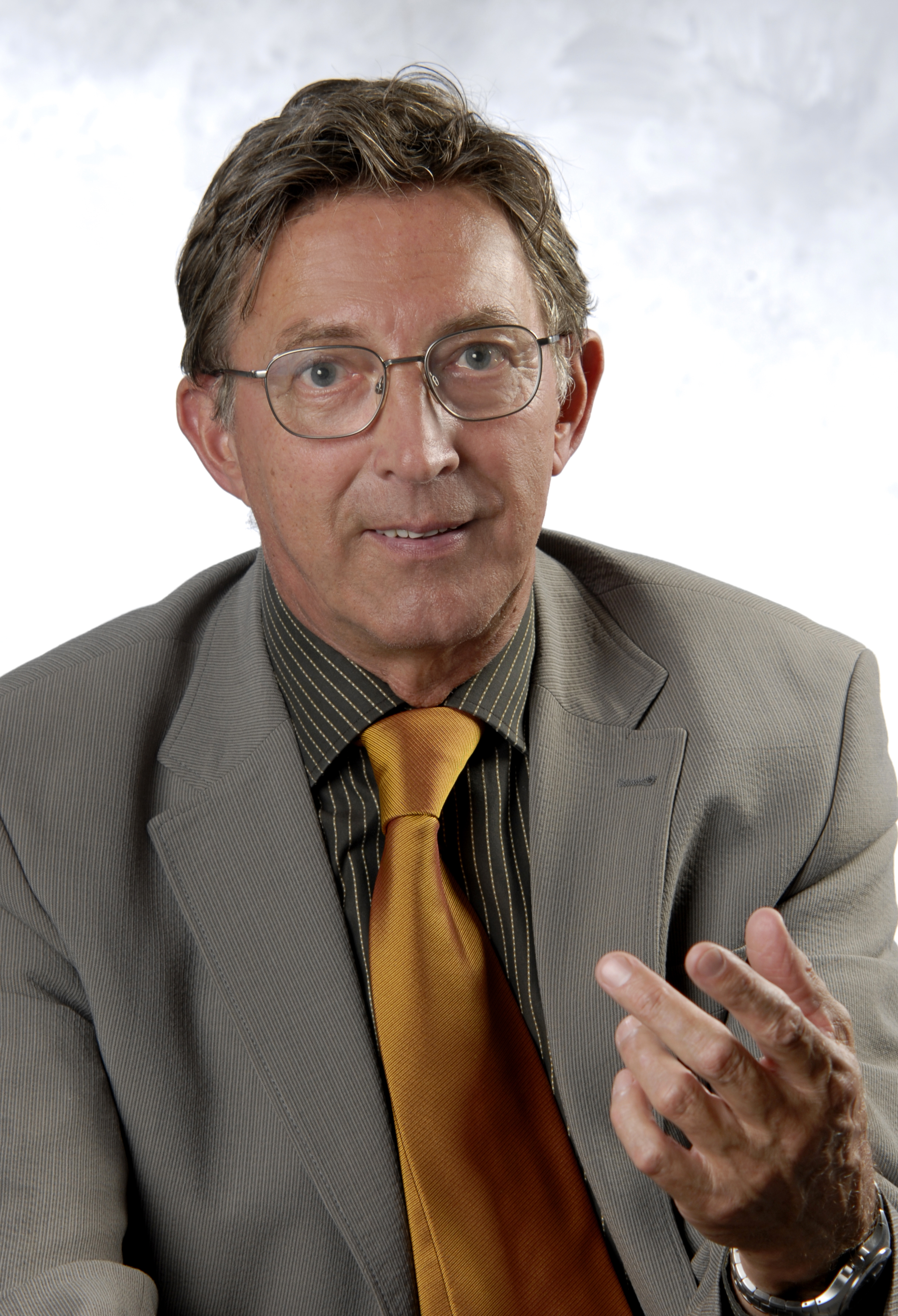
Viljem Ščuka

Viljem Ščuka (born 7 June 1938) is a Slovenian school medicine specialist and psychotherapist, and gestaltist. He is a native of Dutovlje, Slovenia. He is a holder of several Slovenian medical prizes. His work is based on Gestalt psychology or gestaltism.

== Medical career ==
He completed four post-graduate studies after studying medicine (Pediatrics, Psychiatry-child and adolescent psychiatry, Psychotherapy, Gestaltism). His professional (medical practice) activities may be directed to the deviations in the education field, feeling, behavior and treatment of psychosomatic problems of children and youth. He led five scientific researches and two pilot studies. He is a writer of more than 100 scientific articles and more than 50 popular articles. He has conducted over 4000 training hours of psychotherapy, of which 3000 hours of gestalt techniques (Gestalt therapy). In recent 20 years has had added more than 25,000 hours of Gestalt therapy. So far, passed 2500 hours of his own lectures. He is the founder of the School of personality.

== Literary works ==
- Pupil on the path to self (Didakta, 2007), Ljubljana 2007
