= Josip Ipavec =

Slovenian composer

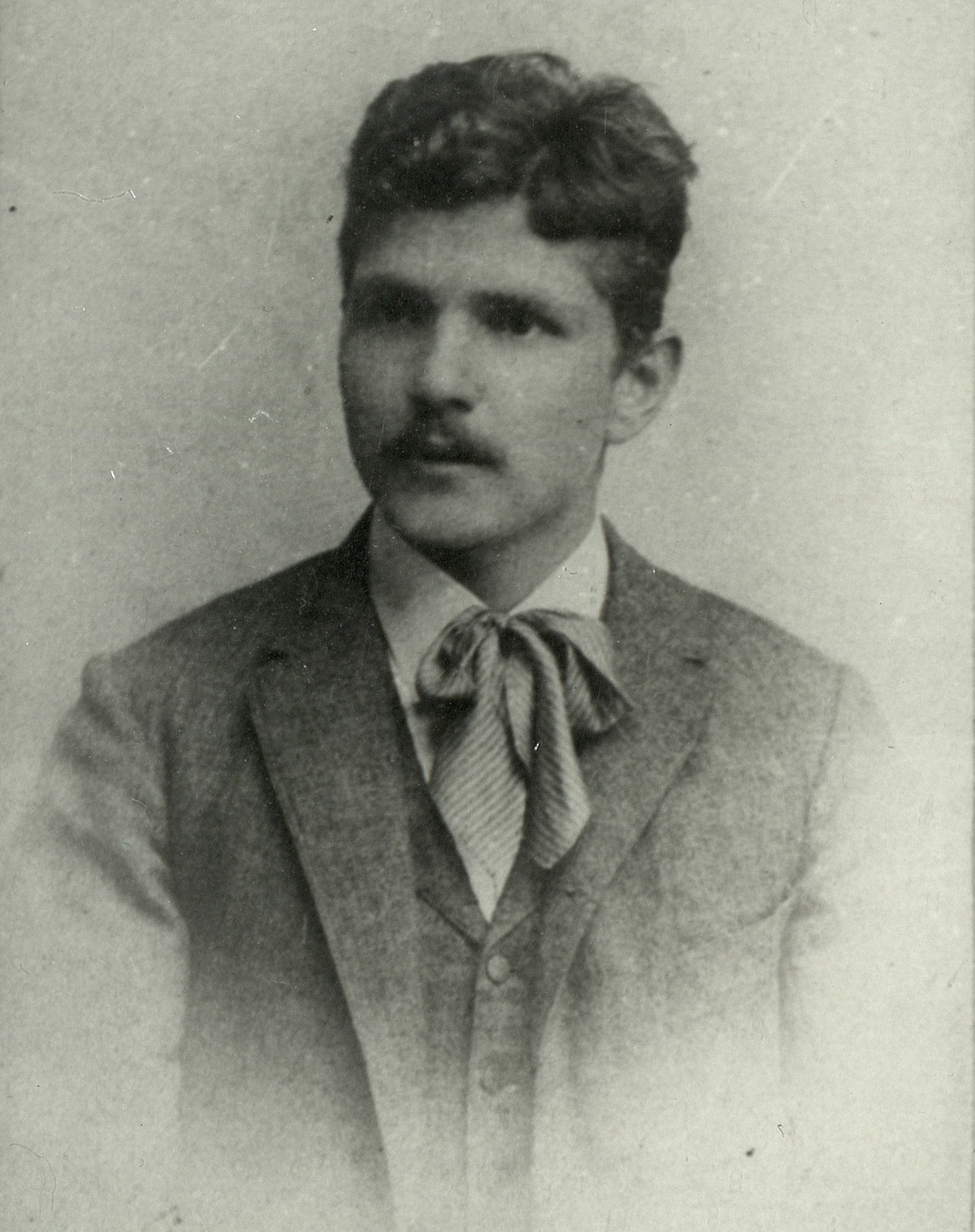
- Relatives: Jeannette Ipavec Čampa (aunt)

The lied At the Crossroads (1891)

Josip Ipavec (21 December 1873 – 8 February 1921, surname sometimes spelled Ipavic) was a Slovenian composer. A native of Šentjur, he lived in that town for much of his life. He was a physician in his professional life, at first in the Austria-Hungarian army and later for the most part in Šentjur. As a composer, he wrote mainly theatre music and lieder. In 1901, he wrote the first and the most often performed Slovene ballet, the pantomime A Little Man ("Možiček").

== See also ==
- List of Slovenian composers
