= Marko Godina =

Slovenian plastic surgeon

Marko Godina (15 April 1943, Ljubljana − 7 February 1986) was a Slovenian plastic surgeon and reconstructive microsurgery pioneer, son of the writer Ferdo Godina.

He studied medicine at the University of Zagreb in Croatia. He also studied in the Great Britain and in the United States. He also studied languages (Italian, French, German, English and Latin). Later he specialised for hand surgery and held lectures all over the world.

In the Medical Centre Ljubljana in Slovenia, he formed and trained a team of surgeons that has become world-wide known after the surgery of amputated extremities. In 1984, he was the first ever to perform temporary ectopic banking of the amputated hand to the axilla to salvage the mutilated upper extremity, which he re-transplanted back to the receiving stump two months later. He was among the founding members of the European Hand Surgery Course.

He and his wife Vesna died in a car crash on the road from Zagreb to Ljubljana. The Marko Godina Travelling Fellowship provides scholarship for plastic surgeons to visit the centers of their choice. The Department of Plastic Surgery and Burns in Ljubljana has been named after him.
