= Šentjur =

Šentjur Sveti Jurij pri Celju (until 1952) Šentjur pri Celju (1952–1990)
- Town
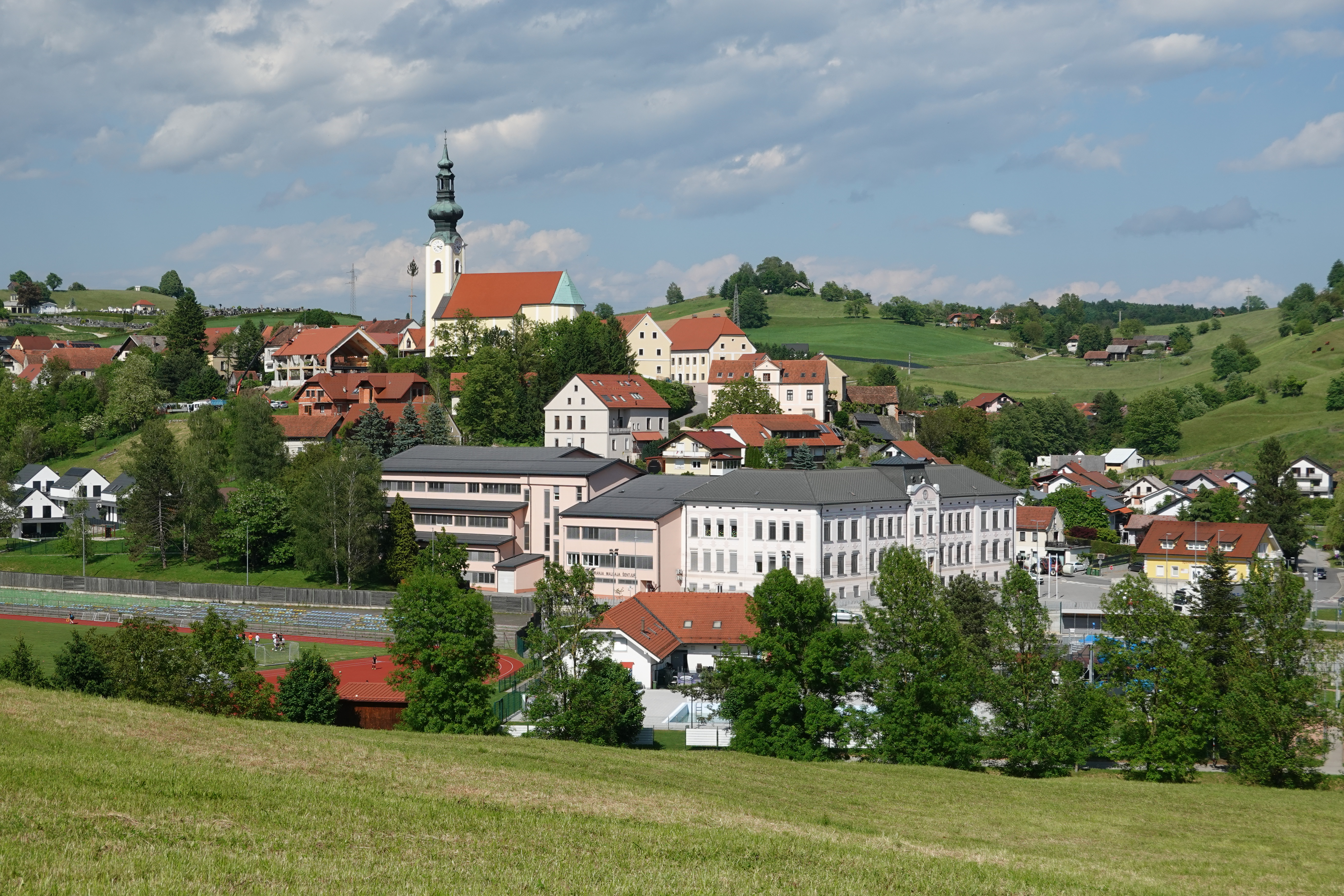
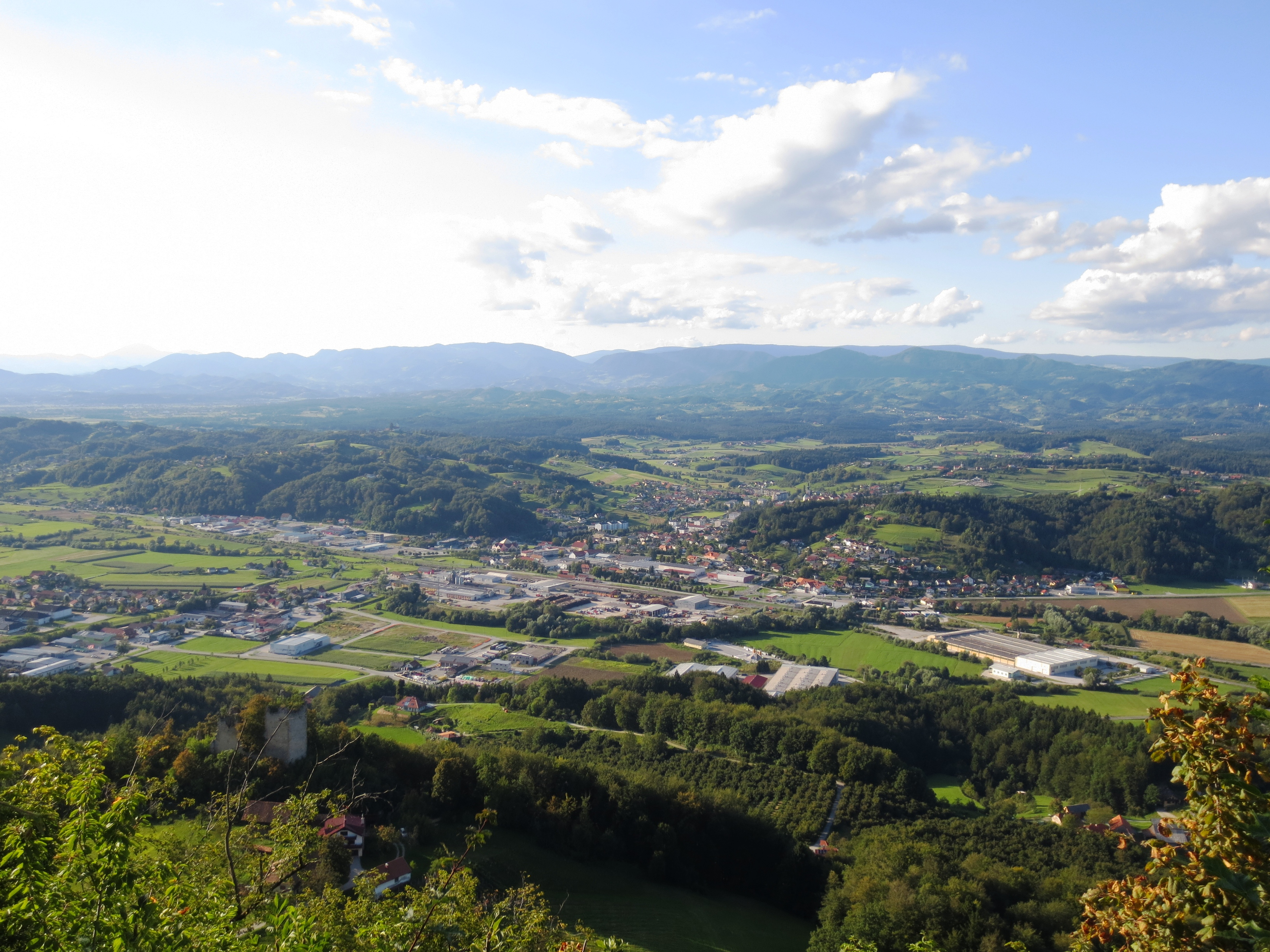
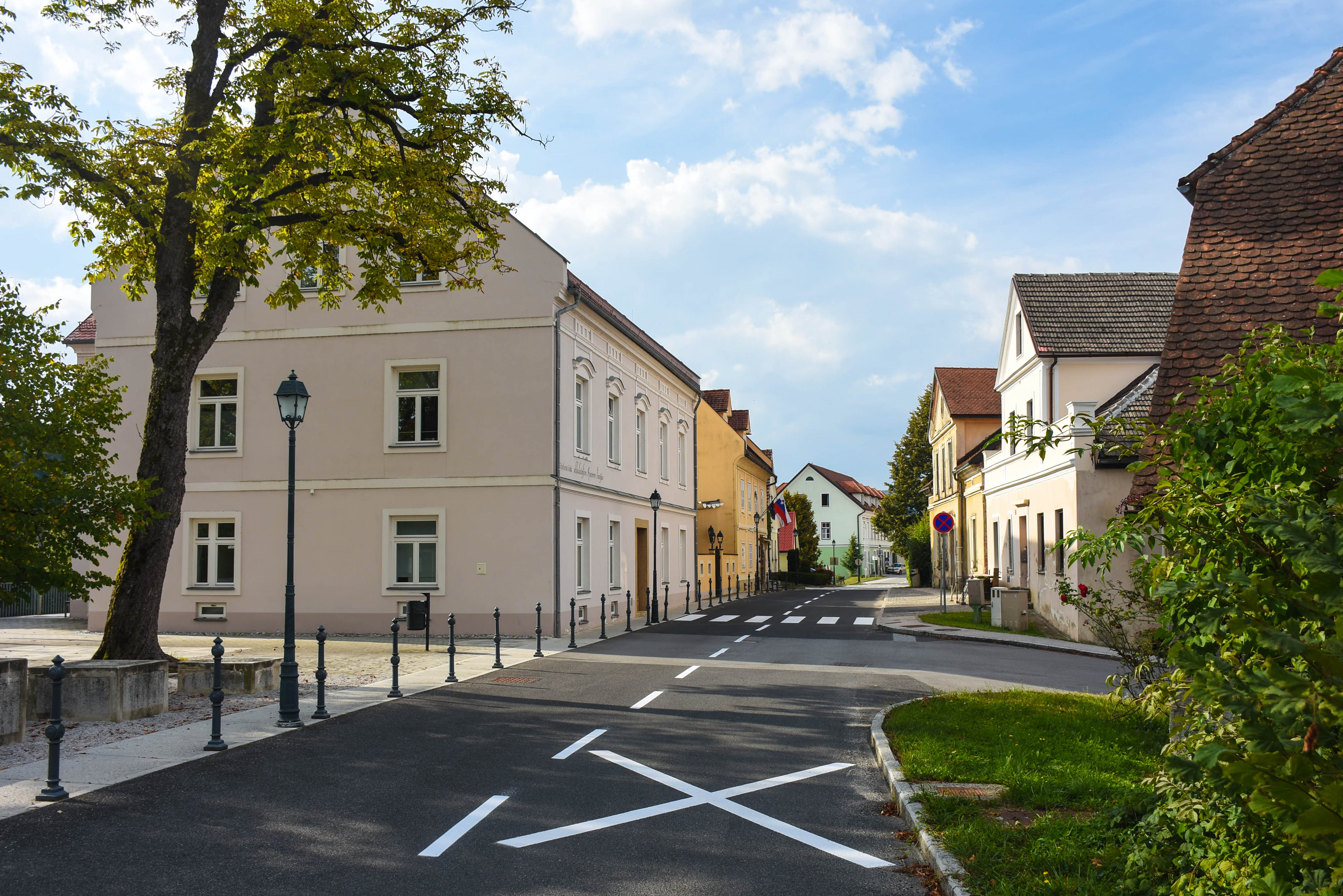
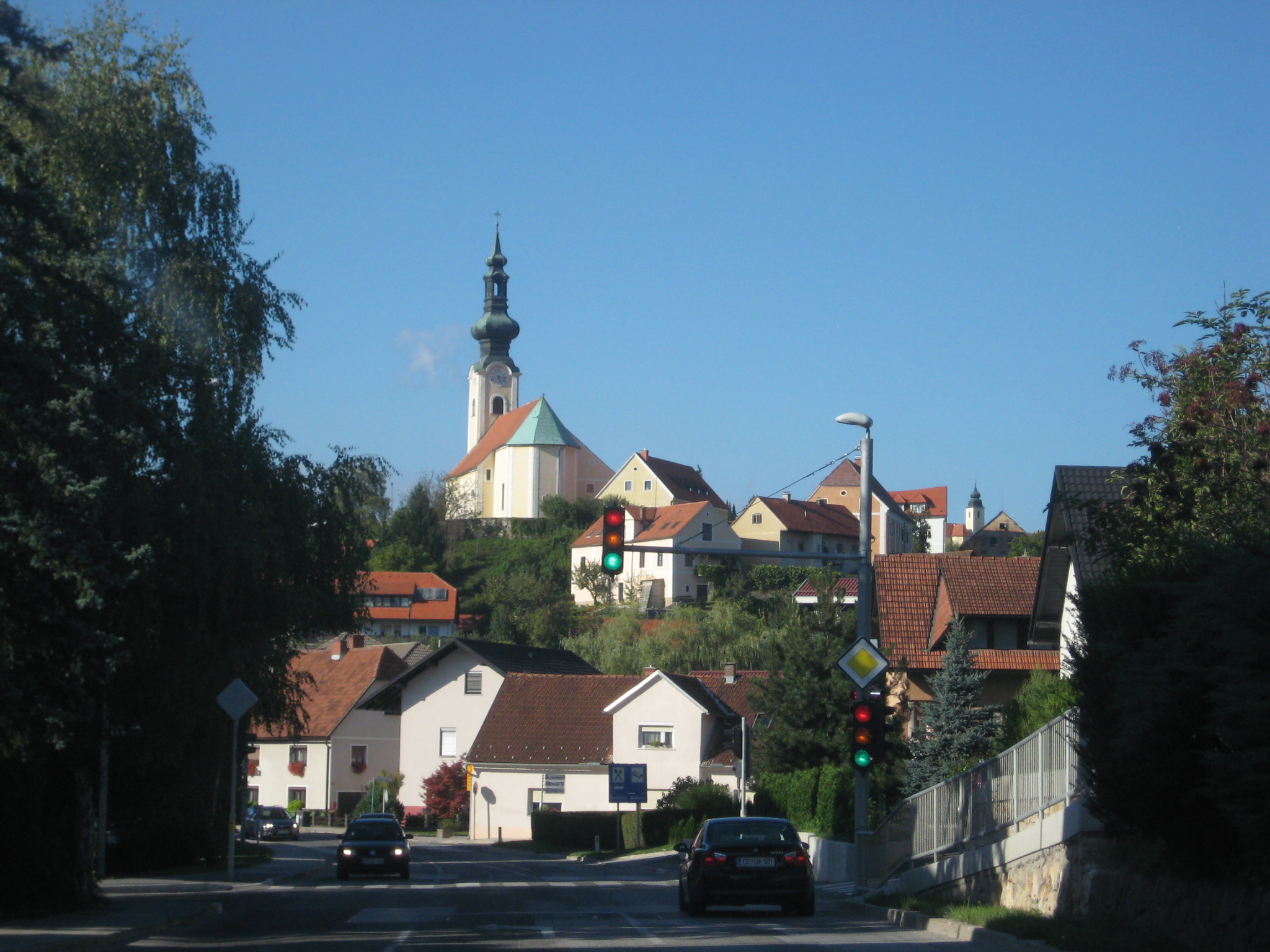
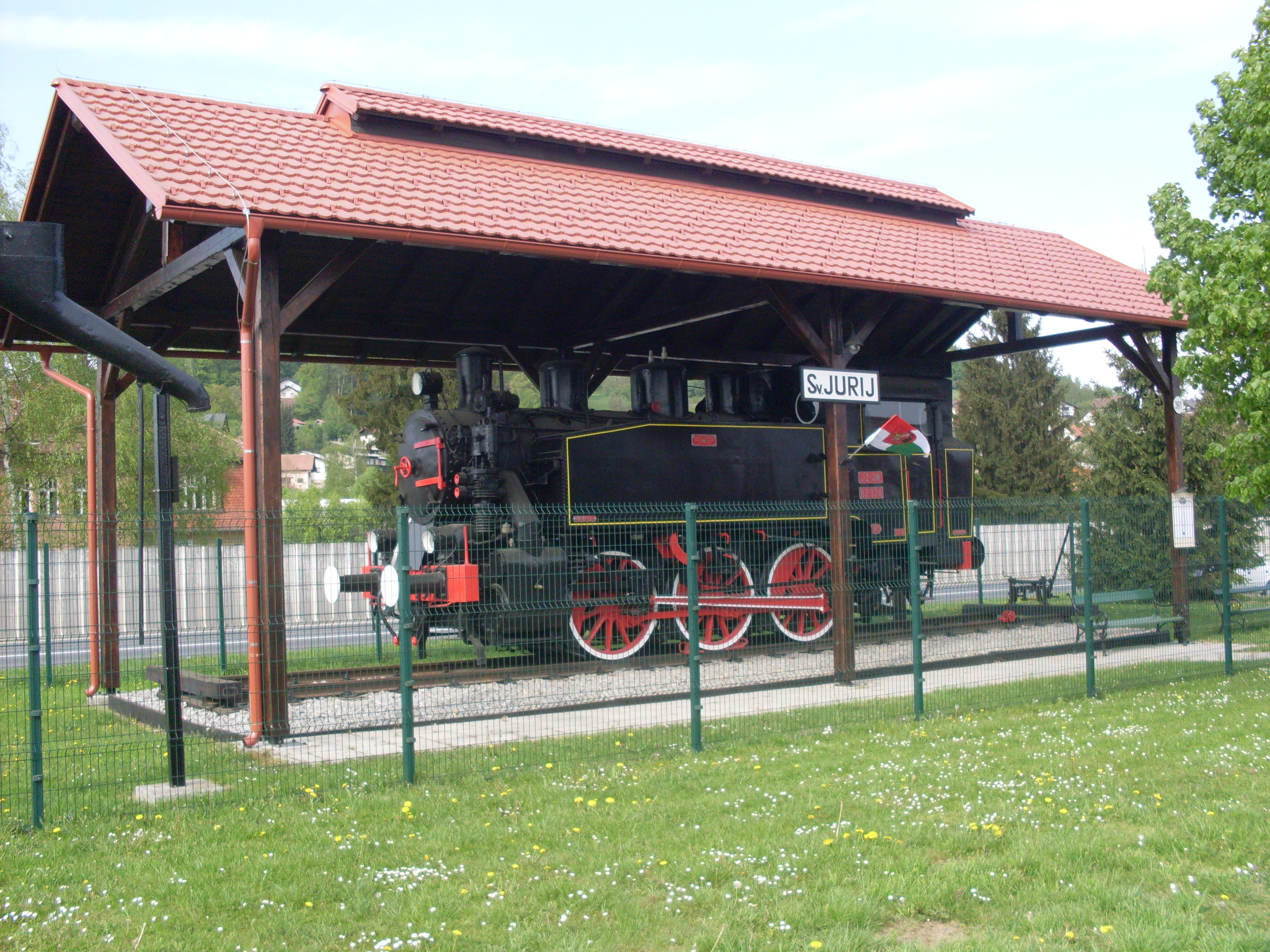
- From top, left to right: Overview of Šentjur, St. George's Church, Railway Station, Town Center, Old Locomotive

- Flag Coat of arms

- Location of the town of Šentjur in Slovenia
- Coordinates: 46°13′3.31″N 15°23′45.53″E
- Country: Slovenia
- Traditional region: Styria
- Statistical region: Savinja
- Municipality: Šentjur
- Elevation: 262.5 m (861 ft)

Population (2020)
  - Total: 4,940
- Time zone: UTC+01 (CET)
  - Summer (DST): UTC+02 (CEST)
- Postal code: 3230 Šentjur
- Vehicle registration: CE
- Climate: Cfb

Šentjur (pronounced [ʃɛntˈjùːɾ] or [ʃəntˈjùːɾ]; in older sources Sveti Jurij ob Južni Železnici, German: Sankt Georgen an der Südbahn) is a town in eastern Slovenia. It is the seat, and largest settlement, of the Municipality of Šentjur. The town lies on the Voglajna River east southeast of Celje. The settlement, and the entire municipality, are included in the Savinja Statistical Region, which is in the Slovenian portion of the historical Duchy of Styria.

== Name ==
In older sources, the name of the town appears as Sveti Jurij ob Južni Železnici (literally, 'Saint George on the Southern Railway'), referring to its location along the Austrian Southern Railway from 1846 onward. The name of the settlement was changed from Sveti Jurij pri Celju (literally, 'Saint George near Celje') to Šentjur pri Celju in 1952. The town was renamed again from Šentjur pri Celju to Šentjur in 1990.

== Church ==
The parish church, which the settlement gets its name from, is dedicated to Saint George (Slovene: sveti Jurij, colloquially šent Jur(ij)) and belongs to the Roman Catholic Diocese of Celje. It was built between 1708 and 1721.

Historical population
| Year | Pop. | ±% |
|---|---|---|
| 1948 | 655 | — |
| 1953 | 759 | +15.9% |
| 1961 | 888 | +17.0% |
| 1971 | 1,331 | +49.9% |
| 1981 | 2,101 | +57.9% |
| 1991 | 4,526 | +115.4% |
| 2002 | 4,723 | +4.4% |
| 2011 | 4,762 | +0.8% |
| 2021 | 4,927 | +3.5% |
Population size may be affected by changes in administrative divisions.

== Notable residents ==
Notabvle people that were born or lived in Šentjur include the following:

- Jeannette Ipavec Čampa (1817–1911), landowner, poet
- Dušan Kveder (1915–1966), communist politician
- Albin Paradiž (1879–1910), painter
