= Šentvid pri Stični =

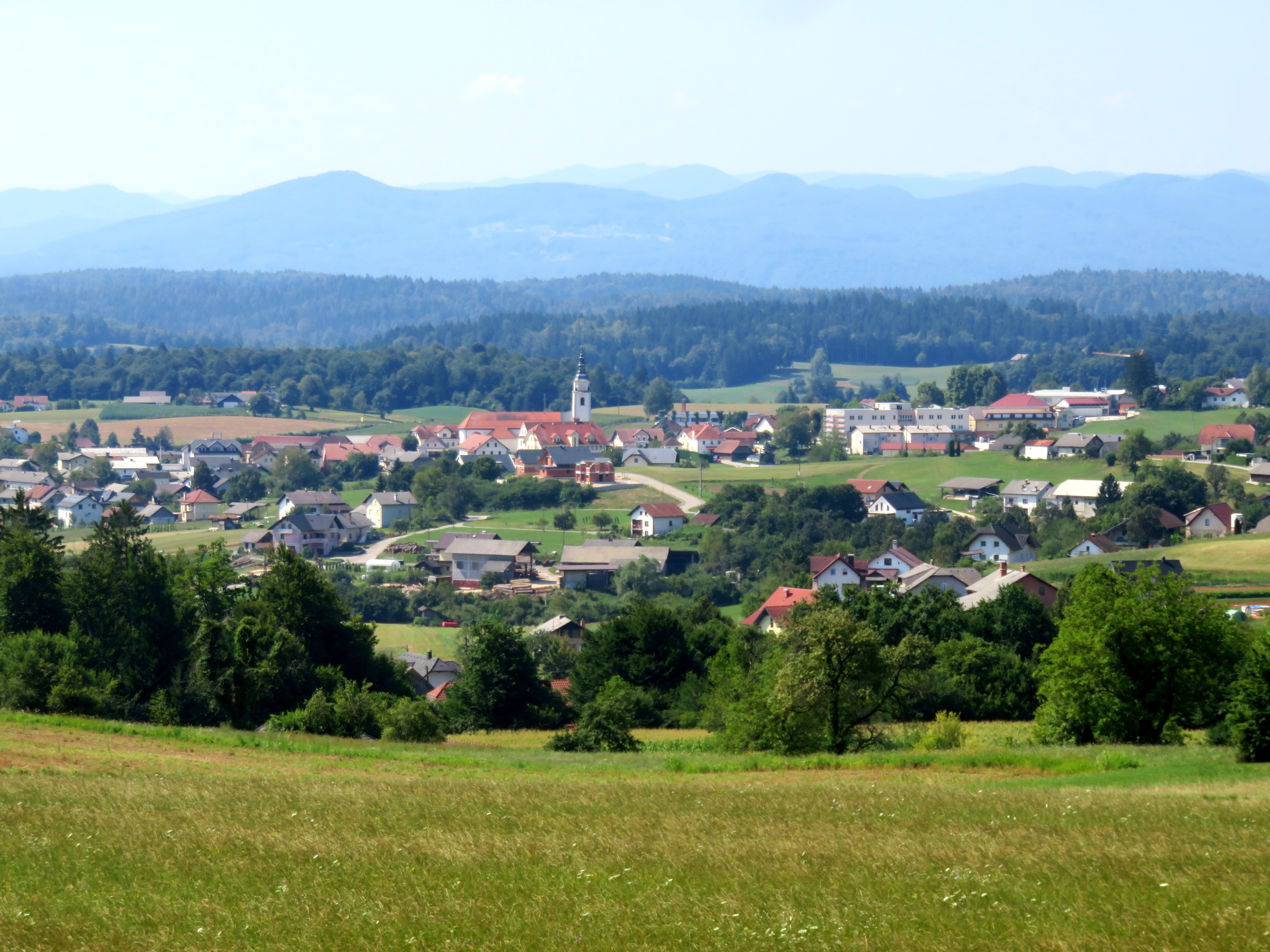

- Location in Slovenia
- Coordinates: 45°57′8.89″N 14°50′26.45″E
- Country: Slovenia
- Traditional region: Lower Carniola
- Statistical region: Central Slovenia
- Municipality: Ivančna Gorica

Area
  - Total: 2.41 km^{2} (0.93 sq mi)
- Elevation: 321.5 m (1,055 ft)

Population (2002)
  - Total: 922

Šentvid pri Stični (pronounced [ʃɛnˈtʋit pɾi ˈstiːtʃni] or [ʃənˈtʋit-]; German: Sankt Veit) is a settlement in the Municipality of Ivančna Gorica in central Slovenia. The area is part of the historical region of Lower Carniola. The municipality is now included in the Central Slovenia Statistical Region. In addition to the sections of the main settlement known as Stari Trg (Slovene: Stari trg) and Zadolžna Vas (Zadolžna vas), it includes the hamlets of Travnik, Sveti Rok (German: Sankt Rochus), Omotce, Postaja Šentvid, and Marof.

== Churches ==
The parish church from which the settlement gets its name is dedicated to Saint Vitus (Slovene: sveti Vid) and belongs to the Roman Catholic Archdiocese of Ljubljana. It was first mentioned in written documents dating to 1136. A second church on a hill just south of the settlement is dedicated to Saint Roch and dates to the 17th century.

== Choir festival ==
The settlement is best known for the annual Slovene Choirs Meeting (Slovene: Tabor slovenskih pevskih zborov), a choral festival held since 1970. It is one of the largest choral events in Europe, bringing together up to 250 choirs and around 5,000 singers from Slovenia and from Slovene communities in neighbouring countries. The central event is a mass open-air concert of combined male, female, and mixed choirs, which is regularly recorded and broadcast by RTV Slovenia. In 1994 the festival received the Silver Order of Freedom of the Republic of Slovenia.

== Sports and recreation ==
A hilly area southeast of the settlement, known locally as Cukarca, is used for outdoor sports and recreation. The Cukarca adventure park near Petrušnja vas has a high-ropes adrenaline course with about 50 obstacles at four heights, two climbing walls, a forest educational trail, and a mountain-bike park with a pump track and jump lines. Nearby, at Dolina pod Kalom, there is a motocross track about 1,650 metres long, run by the Šentvid pri Stični motorcycle club (AMD), which hosts rounds of the Slovenian national motocross championship and occasional international races. Southeast of the village there is also a grass airfield operated by the local flying club, used for VFR flights and, in season, for tandem skydiving.

== Notable people ==
Notable people that were born or lived in Šentvid pri Stični include:

- Anton Črnivec (1856–1936), educator
- Marko Gerbec (1658–1718), physician
- Ivan Janežič (1855–1922), priest
- Josip Korban (1883–1966), youth writer
- Franc Ksaver Kutnar (1793–1846), prince-bishop
- Josip Mandelj (1865–1951), politician
- Ivan Markelj (1852–1903), educator
- Evstahij Ozimek (1817–1898), priest, Franciscan friar
- Janez Stritar (1818–1882), priest, religious writer
- Hugon Turk (1870–1956), veterinary physician
- Ivan Vencajz (1844–1913), lawyer, judge, politician
- Janko Vencajz (1872–1895), historian
- Stanko Vurnik (1898–1952), art historian, ethnologist, musicologist
