= List of Slovenian Catholic bishops =

This is a list of Slovenian Roman Catholic Bishops.

== List ==
Name	Born, died	Consecrated	Diocese	Notes
Alojzij Ambrožič	27th Januar 1930, Gabrje; 26 August 2011, Toronto	27 May 1976	Toronto	Cardinal (1998-2011) Archbishop emeritus of Toronto (1990-2007)
Jožef Balant	28th Januar 1763, Nova vas pri Lescah; 11 May 1834, Gorizia	22 November 1818	Gorizia	
Friderik Irenej Baraga	28 June 1797, Knežja vas 19th Januar 1868, Marquette	1 November 1853	Marquette	Bishop Emeritus of Sault Sainte Marie and Marquette (1857-1868)
Jurij Bizjak	22 February 1947, Col	5 July 2000	Koper	Bishop Emeritus of Koper (2012-2025)
Frančišek Borgia Sedej	10 October 1854, Cerkno; 29 November 1931, Gorizia	25 March 1906	Gorizia	
Hermann of Cilli	1383, Celje; 13 December 1421, Celje	8 September 1413	München - Freising	
Alojzij Cvikl	19 June 1955, Celje	26 April 2015	Maribor	Archbishop of Maribor (since 2015)
Maksimilijan Držečnik	5 October 1903, Zgornja Orlica; 13 May 1978, Maribor	15 December 1946	Maribor	
Andrej Glavan	16 October 1943, Soteska	12 June 2000	Novo Mesto	Bishop Emeritus of Novo Mesto (2006-2021)
Ivan Nepomuk Glavina	13 April 1828, San Antonio in Bosco; 10 November 1899, Trieste	6 October 1878	Trieste	
Janez Frančišek Gnidovec	29 September 1873, Veliki Lipovec; 3 February 1939, Ljubljana	30 November 1924	Skopje	Bishop Emeritus of Skopje (1924-1939)
Andrej Gollmayr	28 November 1797, Radovljica; 17 March 1883, Gorizia	3 June 1855	Gorizia	
Vekoslav Grmič	4 June 1923, Dragotinci; 21 March 2005, Maribor	21 April 1968	Maribor	Auxiliary Bishop Emeritus of Maribor (1968-1980)
Stanislav Hočevar	12 November 1945, Jelendol	24 May 2000	Belgrade	Archbishop Emeritus of Belgrade (2001-2022)
Thomas Chrön	13 November 1560, Ljubljana; 10 February 1630, Gornji Grad	1597	Ljubljana	Prince-Bishop Emeritus of Ljubljana (1597-1630)
Anton Jamnik	27 July 1961, Ljubljana	8 January 2006	Vina (titular)	Auxiliary Bishop of Ljubljana (since 2005)
Anton Bonaventura Jeglič	29 May 1850, Begunje na Gorenjskem; 2 July 1937, Stična	12 September 1897	Ljubljana	
Janez Jenko	5 May 1910, Mavčiče; 24 December 1994, Koper	6 September 1964	Koper	
Andrej Jordan	29 November 1845, Gorizia; 4 October 1905, Gorizia	20 July 1902	Gorizia	
Ivan Jurkovič	10 June 1952, Kočevje	6 October 2001	Krbava (titular)	Apostolic Nuncio to Canada (since 2021) Permanent Observer to the UN in Geneva (2016–2021) Apostolic Nuncio to Russia and Uzbekistan (2011-2016) Apostolic Nuncio to Ukraine (2004-2011) Apostolic Nuncio to Belarus (2001-2004)
Andrej Karlin	15 November 1857, Stara Loka; 5 April 1933, Maribor	19 March 1911	Maribor	
Franc Kramberger	7 October 1936, Lenart v Slovenskih goricah	21 December 1980	Maribor	Archbishop Emeritus of Maribor (1980-2006)
Jožef Kvas	9 September 1919, Zalog pri Cerkljah; 29 December 2005, Ljubljana	12 June 1983	Ljubljana	auxiliary bishop
Franc Ksaver Kutnar	26 October 1793, Šentvid pri Stični; 8 March 1846, Šentandraž v Labotski dolini	3 March 1844	Maribor	
Jernej Legat	16 August 1807, Naklo; 12 February 1875, Trieste	11 April 1847	Trieste	
Stanislav Lenič	6 November 1911, Župeča vas 4 January 1991, Ljubljana	14 January 1968	Ljubljana	Auxiliary Bishop
Mitja Leskovar	3 January 1970, Kranj	8 August 2020	Beneventum(titular)	Apostolic Nuncio to DRC (since 2024)Apostolic Nuncio to Iraq (2020-2024)
Stanislav Lipovšek	10 December 1943, Vojnik	24 April 2010	Celje	Bishop Emeritus of Celje (2010-2018)
Franc Ksaver Lušin	3 December 1781, Hum pri Tinjah; 2 May 1854, Gorizia	3 October 1824	Gorizia	Archbishop Emeritus of Gorizia and Gradisca (1835-1854) Archbishop Emeritus of Lviv and Primate Emeritus of Galicia and Lodomeria (1834–1835) Bishop Emeritus of Trento (1824–1834)
Anton Mahnič	14 September 1850, Kobdilj; 14 December 1920, Zagreb	3 December 1896	Krk	Bishop Emeritus of Krk (1897-1920)
Maksimilijan Matjaž	23 August 1963, Črna na Koroškem	30 May 2021	Celje	Bishop of Celje (since 2021)
Franc Jožef Mikolič	17 March 1739; 4 December 1793	23 January 1790	Ljubljana	auxiliary bishop
Jakob Missia	30 June 1838, Mota; 24. March 1902, Gorizia	7 December 1884	Gorizia	Cardinal (1899-1902) Archbishop Emeritus of Gorizia and Gradisca (1898-1902) Bishop Emeritus of Ljubljana (1884-1898)
Ignacij Mrak	16 October 1810, Hotovlja; 2 January 1901, Marquette	7 February 1869	Marquette	Bishop Emeritus of Sault Sainte Marie and Marquette (1868-1879)
Mihael Napotnik	20 September 1850, Tepanjski Vrh; 28 March 1922, Maribor	27 October 1889	Maribor	
Franc Perko	19 November 1929, Krka; 20 February 2008, Ljubljana	6 January 1987	Belgrade	
Anton Edvard Pevec	16 April 1925, Cleveland; 14 December 2014, Cleveland	2 July 1982	Cleveland	Auxiliary Bishop
Metod Pirih	9 May 1936, Lokovec; 23 March 2021	27 May 1985	Koper	Bishop Emeritus of Koper (1987-2012)
Janez Zlatoust Pogačar	22 January 1811, Vrba; 25 January 1884, Ljubljana	5 September 1875	Ljubljana	
Jožef Pogačnik	28 September 1902, Kovor; 25 March 1980, Ljubljana	7 April 1963	Ljubljana	Archbishop Emeritus of Ljubljana (1964-1980)
Tomaž Prelokar	circa 1421, Celje; 25 April 1496, Constance	1491	Constance	
Matevž Ravnikar	20 September 1776, Vače; 20 November 1845, Trieste	18 December 1831	Trieste	
Franc Rode CM	23 September 1934, Rodica	6 April 1997	Ljubljana	Cardinal (since 2006) Archbishop Emeritus of Ljubljana (1997-2004) Prefect Emeritus of CICLSAL (2004-2011)
Gregorij Rožman	9 March 1883, Dolinčiče; 16 November 1959, Cleveland	14 July 1929	Ljubljana	Bishop Emeritus of Ljubljana (1930-1959)
Andrej Saje	22 April 1966, Novo Mesto	26 September 2021	Novo Mesto	Bishop of Novo mesto (since 2021)
George Slatkonia	21 March 1456, Ljubljana; 26 April 1522, Vienna	13 November 1513	Vienna	Bishop Emeritus of Vienna (1513-1522)
Anton Martin Slomšek	26 November 1800, Uniše; 24 September 1862, Maribor	5 July 1846	Maribor	Bishop Emeritus of Lavant (1846-1862) Beatified (in 1999)
Jožef Smej	15 February 1922, Bogojina; 21 November 2020, Lenart v Slovenskih Goricah	12 May 1983	Tzernicus (titular)	Auxiliary Bishop Emeritus of Maribor (1983-2009)
Josip Srebrnič	2 February 1876, Solkan; 21 June 1966, Krk	8 December 1923	Krk	Bishop Emeritus of Krk (1923-1961)
Andrés Stanovnik	15 December 1949, Buenos Aires	16 December 2001	Corrientes	Archbishop of Corrientes (since 2007) Bishop Emeritus of Reconquista (2001-2007)
Janez Nepomuk Stariha	12 May 1845, Semič; 27 November 1915, Ljubljana	28 October 1902	Rapid City	first bishop of the Diocese of Rapid City
Jakob Stepišnik	22 July 1815, Celje; 28 June 1889, Maribor	18 January 1863	Maribor	
Anton Stres	15 December 1942, Donačka Gora	24 June 2000	Ljubljana	first bishop of the Diocese of Celje
Peter Štumpf	28 June 1962, Murska Sobota	10 September 2006	Murska Sobota	
Alojzij Šuštar	14 November 1920, Grmada; 29 June 2007, Ljubljana	13 April 1980	Ljubljana	
Franc Šuštar	27 April 1959, Ljubljana	15 March 2015	Ressiana (titular)	Auxiliary Bishop of Ljubljana (since 2015)
Ivan Jožef Tomažič	1 August 1876, Miklavž pri Ormožu; 26 February 1949, Maribor	1 August 1928	Maribor	
Jakob Trobec	10 July 1838, Log pri Polhovem Gradcu; 14 December 1921, Brockway	21 September 1897	Saint Cloud	Bishop Emeritus of Saint Cloud (1897-1914)
Alojzij Turk	21 November 1909, Prečna; 20 April 1995, Ljubljana	20 April 1980	Belgrade	
Marjan Turnšek	25 July 1955, Celje	25 June 2006	Maribor	Archbishop Emeritus of Maribor (2009-2013) Bishop Emeritus of Murska Sobota (2006-2009)
Alojz Uran	22 January 1945, Spodnje Gameljne; 11 April 2020, Ljubljana	6 January 1993	Ljubljana	Archbishop Emeritus of Ljubljana (2004-2009)
Lojze Urbanč	25 July 1958, Buenos Aires	10 March 2007	Catamarca	
Anton Vovk	19 May 1900, Vrba; 7 July 1963, Ljubljana	1 December 1946	Ljubljana	Archbishop Emeritus of Ljubljana (1959-1963)
Janez Vertin	17 July 1844, Dobliče; 26 February 1899, Marquette	14 September 1879	Marquette	Bishop Emeritus of Sault Sainte Marie and Marquette (1879-1899)
Anton Aloys Wolf	14 June 1782, Idrija; 7 February 1859, Ljubljana	2 October 1824	Ljubljana	Bishop Emeritus of Ljubljana (1824-1859)
Stanislav Zore	7 September 1958, Znojile	23 November 2014	Ljubljana	Archbishop of Ljubljana (since 2014)
Alojzij Matija Zorn	13 January 1837, Prvačina; 8 July 1897, Vienna	14 January 1883	Gorizia	
Jožef Žabkar	24 December 1914, Ljubljana; 19 May 1984, Rome	30 June 1969		Apostolic Nuncio
Anton Žerdin Bukovec	11 June 1950, Čentiba	14 April 2002	San Ramón	Apostolic Vicar
