= Catholic Church in Slovenia =

- Slovene: Katoliška cerkev na Slovenskem
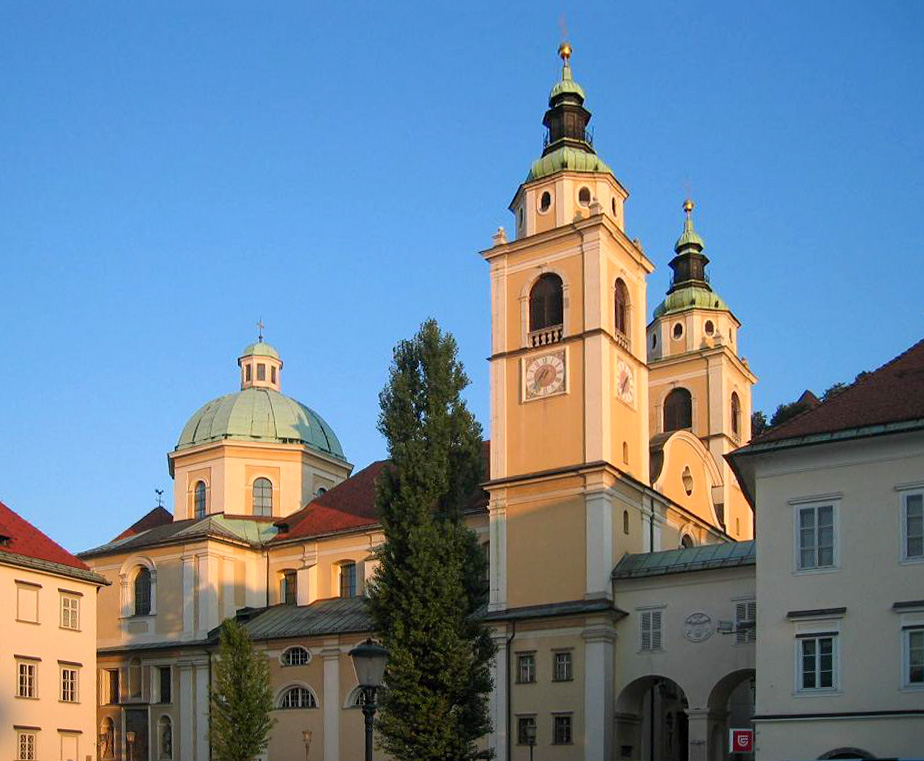
- Saint Nicholas Cathedral, Ljubljana
- Type: National polity
- Classification: Catholic
- Orientation: Latin
- Scripture: Bible
- Theology: Catholic theology
- Polity: Episcopal polity
- Governance: SBC
- Pope: Leo XIV
- President of SBC: Andrej Saje, Bishop of Novo mesto
- Archbishop of Ljubljana: Stanislav Zore
- Archbishop of Maribor: Alojzij Cvikl
- Metropolises: Ljubljana, Maribor
- Dioceses: Ljubljana, Maribor, Celje, Koper, Novo mesto, Murska Sobota
- Region: Slovenia
- Language: Slovenian, Latin
- Liturgy: Roman Rite
- Headquarters: Ljubljana
- Territory: Slovenia
- Members: 1,517,274 (2021)

The Slovenian Catholic Church, or Catholic Church in Slovenia (Slovene: Katoliška cerkev v Sloveniji) is part of the worldwide Catholic Church, under the spiritual leadership of the Pope in Rome. The 2018 Eurobarometer data shows 73.4% of Slovenian population identifying as Catholic that fell to 72.1% in the 2019 Eurobarometer survey. According to the Catholic Church data, the Catholic population fell from 78.04% in 2009 to 72.11% in 2019.

There are total of 1,509,986 (72.11%) Catholics in Slovenia in 2019 by official statistics published by Catholic Church of Slovenia. The country is divided into six dioceses, including two archdioceses. The diocese of Maribor was elevated to an archdiocese by Pope Benedict XVI in 2006. Additionally, the pope created three new sees, namely Novo Mesto, Celje and Murska Sobota.

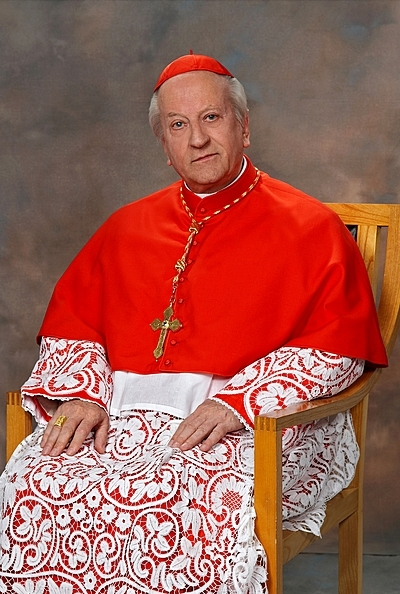
Cardinal Franc Rode CM

Slovenian Catholic Church is governed by the Slovenian Bishops' Conference. Informally archbishop of Ljubljana is considered Primate of Slovenia.

Slovenian Catholic Church and Slovenian priests operate in Slovenian churches worldwide, most notably in Slovenian Church of St. Cyril in New York.

Archbishop Luigi Bianco, Titular of Falerone, is the Apostolic Nuncio to Slovenia and the Apostolic Delegate to Kosovo.

Cardinal Franc Rode CM, is the only cardinal of the Catholic Church in Slovenia. Another cardinal of Slovenin descent is Vicente Bokalic Iglic CM of Argentina.

== Timeline ==
Catholics by years

Year	Catholics	Population
2009	1,577,014	78.04%
2010	1,569,119	▼77.30%
2011	1,557,276	▼76.85%
2012	1,554,355	▲81.40%
2013	1,543,114	▼80.06%
2014	1,523,040	▼74.52%
2015	1,535,297	▲75.68%
2016	1,523,113	▼75.32%
2017	1,511,980	▼73.15%
2018	1,513,756	▼72.74%
2019	1,509,986	▼72.11%
2020	1,507,477	▼71.48%
2021	1,490,535	▼70.68%
2022	1,480,156	▼69.92%

== Territorial organization ==
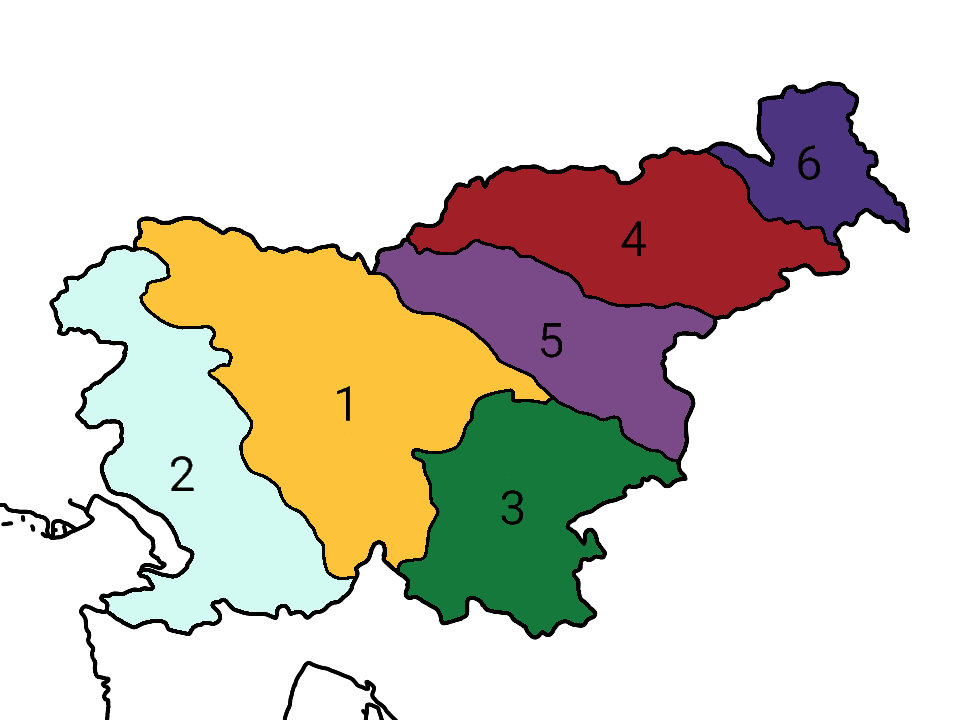
Map of Slovenian dioceses: Ljubljana (1), Koper (2), Novo mesto (3), Maribor (4), Celje (5), Murska Sobota (6)

=== Ecclesiastical structure ===
Catholic Church in Slovenia is organized in two ecclesiastical provinces (metropolises; cerkvene pokrajine - metropolije):

- Metropolis of Ljubljana (Ljubljanska metropolija), and
- Metropolis of Maribor (Mariborska metropolija).

Each metropolis is divided into three dioceses of which one is metropolitan archdiocese and two are suffragan dioceses.

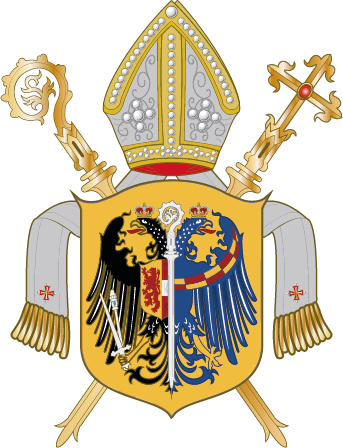
Coat of Arms of Archdiocese of Ljubljana

=== Metropolis of Ljubljana ===
Metropolis of Ljubljana is presided over by Metropolitan Archbishop of Ljubljana, currently Stanislav Zore OFM.

It is divided into three dioceses:

- Archdiocese of Ljubljana (metropolitan see),
- Diocese of Koper (suffragan diocese),
- Diocese of Novo mesto (suffragan diocese).

Diocese	Bishop	Cathedral	Population	Catholics	Decanates	Parishes
Ljubljana	Stanislav Zore OFM	Cathedral of Saint Nicholas	763.765	554.950	17	232
Koper	Peter Štumpf SDB, PhD	Cathedral of the Assumption of the Blessed Virgin Mary	258.380	202.900	11	189
Novo mesto	Andrej Saje, PhD	Cathedral of Saint Nicholas	159.600	137.500	6	71

Archdiocese of Ljubljana is divided into 4 archdeaconries and 17 deaneries (decanates):

- Archdeaconry I: Ljubljana – Center, Ljubljana – Moste, Ljubljana – Šentvid, Ljubljana – Vič/Rakovnik;
- Archdeaconry II: Kranj, Radovljica, Šenčur, Škofja Loka, Tržič;
- III. Archdeaconry III: Domžale, Kamnik, Litija, Zagorje; and
- Archdeaconry IV: Cerknica, Grosuplje, Ribnica, Vrhnika.

Decanates of Diocese of Koper are Dekani, Idrija – Cerkno, Ilirska Bistrica, Kobarid, Koper, Kraška dekanija, Nova Gorica, Postojna, Šempeter, Tolmin, Vipavska dekanija.

Decanates of Diocese of Novo mesto are Črnomelj, Kočevje, Leskovec, Novo mesto, Trebnje, Žužemberk.

=== Metropolis of Maribor ===
Metropolis of Maribor is presided over by Metropolitan Archbishop of Maribor, currently Alojzij Cvikl SJ.

It is divided into three dioceses:

- Archdiocese of Maribor (metropolitan see),
- Diocese of Celje (suffragan diocese),
- Diocese of Murska Sobota (suffragan diocese).

Diocese	Bishop	Cathedral	Population	Catholics	Decanates	Parishes
Maribor	Alojzij Cvikl SJ	Cathedral of Saint John the Baptist	419.055	355.654	12	143
Celje	Maksimilijan Matjaž, ThD	Cathedral of Saint Daniel	289.846	237.370	11	112
Murska Sobota	Peter Štumpf SDB, PhD, Apostolic administrator sede vacante	Cathedral of Saint Nicholas	120.146	95.463	3	36

Archdiocese of Maribor is divided into 5 archdeaconries and 12 decanates:

- "Bistriško-konjiški" Archdeaconry: Slovenska Bistrica, Slovenske Konjice,
- "Mariborski" Archdeaconry: Maribor, Dravosko polje,
- "Ptujsko–ormoški" Archdeaconry: Ptuj, Velika Nedelja, Zavrč,
- "Slovenjegoriški" Archdeaconry: Jarenina, Lenart v Slovenskih goricah,
- "Koroški" Archdeaconry: Dravograd – Mežiška dolina, Radlje – Vuzenica, Stari trg.

Decanates of Diocese of Celje are Celje, Nova Cerkev, Žalec, Kozje, Rogatec, Šmarje pri Jelšah, Braslovče, Gornji Grad, Šaleška dolina, Laško, Videm ob Savi.

Decanates of Diocese of Murska Sobota are Lendava, Ljutomer, Murska Sobota.

== Judiciary ==
There are two ecclesiastical courts of first instance in Slovenia:

- Metropolitan Ecclesiastical Court in Ljubljana for Archdiocese of Ljubljana and dioceses of Koper and Novo mesto,
- Metropolitan Ecclesiastical Court in Maribor for Archdiocese of Maribor and dioceses of Celje and Murska Sobota.

Second instance courts are in Maribor (for Metropolis of Ljubljana) and Ljubljana (for Metropolis of Maribor).

The court of third instance operates within the Roman Curia and is called the Roman Rota. In addition, within the Holy See, there is the Apostolic Signatura, which is an administrative court responsible for assessing the validity of canonical legal procedures for the universal Church; it also has authority over the appointment of ecclesiastical judges in local courts. The third court within the universal Church is the Apostolic Penitentiary, which is responsible for matters concerning the internal sacramental forum of the Church. A tribunal has also been established within the Dicastery for the Doctrine of the Faith, which deals with criminal offenses related to sexual abuse.

== Relations with the Holy See ==
Slovenia and the Holy See concluded a concordate on May 28, 2004.

The Holy See has a apostolic nunciature in Ljubljana and Slovenia has a separate embassy in Rome, responsible for the Holy See (additionally to the one for the Italian Republic). Archbishop Luigi Bianco, Titular of Falerone, is the current Apostolic Nuncio to Slovenia and the Apostolic Delegate to Kosovo. Franc But is an ambassador of Slovenia to the Holy See.

=== Slovenians in the Roman Curia ===
Cardinal Franc Rode CM served as Prefect of the Congregation for Institutes of Consecrated Life and Societies of Apostolic Life from 2004 to 2011.

Archbishops Ivan Jurkovič and Mitja Leskovar serve in the Holy See's diplomatic service. Jurkovič has served as Apostolic Nuncio to Canada since 2021, and Leskovar has served as Apostolic Nuncio to Democratic Republic of the Congo since 2024.

== See also ==
- Religion in Slovenia
- Episcopal Conference of Slovenia
- Greek Catholic Church of Croatia and Serbia (also covers Slovenia)
- List of Slovenian cardinals
- List of Slovenian Catholic bishops
