= Episcopal Conference of Slovenia =

Assembly of Catholic bishops

Slovenian Bishops' Conference (SBC; Slovene: Slovenska škofovska konferenca, SŠK; Latin: Conferentia Episcoporum Sloveniae) is the highest authority of the Catholic Church in the Republic of Slovenia. Its territory coincides with the national borders. According to the statute, all local ordinaries, auxiliary bishops, and assistant bishops, and other titular bishops with a special task entrusted to them by the Apostolic See or the SŠK, which they carry out within this territory.

Slovenian dioceses are (each metropolitan archdiocese and its suffragan dioceses constitute an ecclesiastical province):

- Archdiocese of Ljubljana,
  - Diocese of Koper,
  - Diocese of Novo mesto;
- Archdiocese of Maribor,
  - Diocese of Celje, and
  - Diocese of Murska Sobota.

== History ==
Slovenian Bishops' Conference has been set up on February 20, 1993. This follows the Slovenian Bishops together with the other bishops of the former Yugoslavia related to the Yugoslav Bishops' Conference, which was within the 20th June 1983 set up provincial Slovenian Bishops' Conference. Slovenian bishops at its meeting on July 25, 1992, prepared a draft statute of an independent Slovenian Bishops' Conference. Pope John Paul II (1978-2005), after obtaining a favorable opinion of the Congregation for Bishops and the Office for Relations with States at the National Registry of the Holy See, on February 19, 1993, in accordance with the norms of canon law and the provisions of the statutes approved independent Slovenian Bishops' Conference on February 20, 1993, the Vatican Congregation for Bishops issued a decree on its establishment. The Catholic Church in Slovenia has thus gained greater legal strength and independence.

SBC statute governing the nature and purposes of the Bishops' Conference, Plenary Session, provides for a permanent council of bishops, secretarial duties and other services and commission at the discretion of the conference provide a more efficient operation.

== Members ==
Members of the Bishops' Conference, all the local bishops in geographical or ecclesiastical-administrative areas. Apart from them as well as assistant bishops, auxiliary bishops and bishops of the title before them the Holy See or the Bishops' Conference has entrusted the task specified in this territory. Others address the bishops and the Apostolic Nuncio not its members.

=== Current members ===
Slovenian Bishops' Conference currently consists of 7 members:

- Msgr. Andrej Saje, PhD, Bishop of Novo Mesto, President of the SBC
- Msgr. Peter Štumpf SDB, PhD, Bishop of Koper, Vice-President of the SBC
- Msgr. Stanislav Zore OFM, Metropolitan Archbishop of Ljubljana
- Msgr. Alojzij Cvikl SJ, Metropolitan Archbishop of Maribor
- Msgr. Maksimilijan Matjaž, ThD, Bishop of Celje
- Msgr. Anton Jamnik, PhD, Auxiliary Bishop of Ljubljana
- Msgr. Franc Šuštar, PhD, Auxiliary Bishop of Ljubljana, General Secretary pro hac vice tantum
- Msgr. Janez Kozinc, PhD, Bishop of Murska Sobota.

=== Former members ===
- Msgr. Andrej Glavan, Bishop Emeritus of Novo mesto
- Msgr. Franc Kramberger, PhD, Archbishop Emeritus of Maribor
- Msgr. Stanislav Lipovšek, PhD, Bishop Emeritus of Celje
- H.Em. Cardinal Franc Rode CM, PhD, Archbishop Emeritus of Ljubljana
- Msgr. Anton Stres CM, PhD, Archbishop Emeritus of Ljubljana
- Msgr. Marjan Turnšek, PhD, Archbishop Emeritus of Maribor
- Msgr. Jurij Bizjak, PhD, Bishop Emeritus of Koper

==== Deceased former members ====
- msgr. Jože Kvas, Auxiliary Bishop Emeritus of Ljubljana
- msgr. Metod Pirih, MA, Bishop Emeritus of Koper
- msgr. Jožef Smej, PhD, Auxiliary Bishop Emeritus of Maribor
- msgr. Alojzij Šuštar, PhD, Archbishop Emeritus of Ljubljana
- msgr. Alojz Uran, MA, Archbishop Emeritus of Ljubljana
- msgr. Franc Perko, PhD, Archbishop Emeritus of Belgrade

==== Other Slovenian bishops (not members) ====
- Msgr. Stanislav Hočevar SDB, PhD, Archbishop Emeritus of Belgrade
- Msgr. Alojz Turk, Archbishop Emeritus of Belgrade
- Msgr. Ivan Jurkovič, Apostolic Nuncio, Titular Archbishop of Krbava
- Msgr. Mitja Leskovar, Apostolic Nuncio, Titular Archbishop of Beneventum
- Msgr. Martin Kmetec, Archbishop of İzmir

== Leadership ==
=== President ===
Members of the SBC elect the president and vice-president, who must be diocesan bishops and must not be from the same ecclesiastical province. Their term lasts 5 (five) years. The elections are conducted in accordance with canon 119 of the Code of Canon Law, except that a two-thirds presence of members is required, of whom at least four must be diocesan bishops. The president’s mandate can be renewed consecutively only once through elections.

- Alojzij Šuštar (1993–1997)
- Franc Rode (1997–2004)
- Franc Kramberger (2004–2007)
- Alojz Uran (2007–2010)
- Anton Stres (2010–2013)
- Andrej Glavan (2013–2017)
- Stanislav Zore (2017–2022)
- Andrej Saje (since 2022)

=== General Secretary ===
The plenary assembly elects a general secretary, who is either a bishop or a priest. His term lasts 5 (five) years and can be renewed.

- Anton Štrukelj, PhD (1993–2002)
- Andrej Saje, PhD (2003–2013), later Bishop of Novo mesto and President of SBC
- Tadej Strehovec OFM, PhD (2013–2023)
- Msgr. Franc Šuštar, PhD (pro hac vice tantum since 2023)

The plenary assembly appoints an economist, who is either a priest or a layperson. His term lasts 5 (five) years and can be renewed. The economist is a member of the general secretariat. The plenary assembly of the Conference also appoints a supervisory board consisting of three members and selects a president from among them. Their term lasts three years and can be renewed.

== Organization ==
SBC has the following bodies:

- Plenary Assembly (consists of SBC members),
- Permanent Council (President, Vice-President and one bishop member),
- General Secretariat,
- councils, commissions and committees.

== See also ==
- Roman Catholicism in Slovenia
