= List of Slovenian cardinals =

This is a complete list of Slovenian cardinals of the Roman Catholic Church.

| # | Image | Name | Born | Elevated | Cardinal title | Other titles | Conclaves | Died | Reference |
|---|---|---|---|---|---|---|---|---|---|
| 1 | Jakob Missia | Jakob Missia | 30 July 1838; Hrastje - Mota, Austrian Empire (modern Slovenia) | 18 June 1899 by Pope Leo XIII | Cardinal-Priest of S. Stephani in Coelio Monte (2 years, 279 days) | Prince-Bishop of Ljubljana Archbishop of Gorizia | None | 24 March 1902; Gorizia, Austria-Hungary (modern Italy) | |
| 2 | Alojzij Ambrožič | Alojzij Ambrožič | 27 January 1930; Gabrje, Kingdom of Yugoslavia (modern Slovenia) | 21 February 1998 by Pope John Paul II | Cardinal-Priest of Santi Marcellino e Pietro al Laterano (13 years, 186 days) | Cardinal Archbishop of Toronto | 2005 | 26 August 2011; Toronto, Canada | |
| 3 | Franc Rode | Franc Rode | 23 September 1934; Rodica, Kingdom of Yugoslavia (modern Slovenia) | 24 March 2006 by Pope Benedict XVI | Cardinal-Priest of S. Francesco Saverio alla Garbatella (18 years, 360 days) | Metropolitan Archbishop emeritus of Ljubljana | 2013 | Living | |
