= Anton Stres =

20th and 21st-century Slovenian Catholic Archbishop

His Excellency Anton Stres C.M.
- Archbishop Emeritus of Ljubljana; Titular Bishop Emeritus of Ptuj
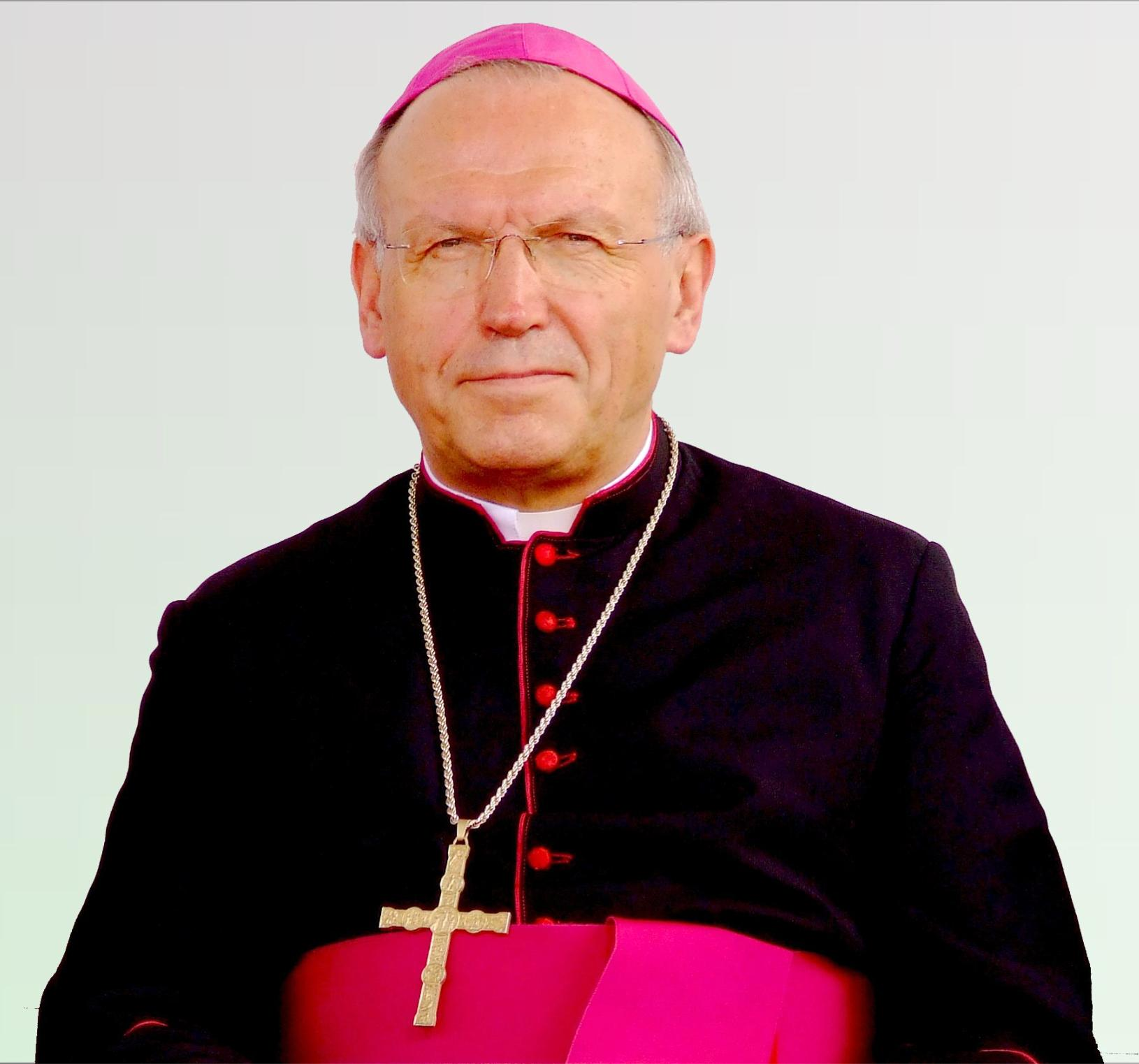
- Church: Roman Catholic Church
- Archdiocese: Ljubljana
- Appointed: 28 November 2009
- Installed: 24 January 2010
- Term ended: 31 July 2013
- Predecessor: Alojz Uran
- Successor: Stanislav Zore
- Other post: President Emeritus of Slovenian Bishop's Conference
- Previous posts: Dean, Faculty of Theology, University of Ljubljana (1999–2000); Auxiliary Bishop of Maribor (2000–2006); Bishop of Celje (2006–2009); Coadjutor Archbishop of Maribor (2009–2010); titular Bishop of Ptuj

Orders
- Ordination: 20 April 1968
- Consecration: 24 June 2000 by Franc Kramberger; Franc Rode; Metod Pirih

Personal details
- Born: 15 December 1942 (age 83) Donačka Gora, Lower Styria, Nazi Germany (present day Slovenia)
- Denomination: Roman Catholic
- Residence: Ljubljana
- Profession: Theologian, philosopher
- Education: University of Ljubljana, Institut Catholique de Paris
- Motto: Omnia propter evangelium
- Coat of arms: Anton Stres's coat of arms

Ordination history of Anton Stres
History
Episcopal consecration
- Consecrated by: Franc Kramberger
- Date: 24 June 2000
Episcopal succession
Bishops consecrated by Anton Stres as principal consecrator
- Marjan Turnšek: 25 June 2006
- Peter Štumpf: 10 September 2006
- Stanislav Lipovšek: 24 April 2010

Anton Stres, C.M. (born 15 December 1942), was the archbishop of the Roman Catholic Archdiocese of Ljubljana and the metropolitan bishop of Ljubljana as well as the president of the Slovenian Bishops' Conference from January 2010 until July 2013. As Archbishop of Ljubljana he was also the grand chancellor of the Faculty of Theology of the University of Ljubljana.

== Biography ==
=== Education ===
Stres was born on 15 December 1942 in Donačka Gora. He attended primary school (four years) in his home village, and finished lower secondary school (four years) in Rogaška Slatina. He continued his studies at the Interdiocese Preparatory Seminary in Zagreb, Croatia (Croatian: Interdijecezanska srednja škola za spremanje svećenika v Zagrebu), taking his leaving exam in 1962. He entered the Congregation of the Mission, more commonly known as the Vincentians or Lazarists, on 22 August 1960 in Belgrade, Serbia.

Stres' education was then put on hold for two years because of mandatory military service in the Yugoslav People's Army; he was stationed in Ohrid, SR Macedonia.

After completing his military service in 1963, Stres entered the Faculty of Theology, of the University of Ljubljana, where he completed three years of study. Then he was sent to the Faculty of Theology at the Catholic University of Paris, where he received a Licentiate of Sacred Theology in 1969. During this time, he made his perpetual profession on 28 March 1967 and was ordained a priest on 20 April 1968. He continued his studies at the institute's Faculty of Philosophy and received a M.A. in philosophy in 1972.

The same year, Stres returned to the Ljubljana faculty as graduate student and also as an assistant instructor at the Department of Philosophy; on 1 October 1974 he defended his doctoral thesis Development of the Marxist Understanding of Religion in Postwar Yugoslavia (Slovene: Razvoj marksističnega pojmovanja religije v povojni Jugoslaviji), thereby obtaining his doctorate in theology.

After this Stres returned to Paris for postdoctoral study at the Faculty of Philosophy at the Catholic University of Paris; on 30 November 1984 he obtained his second PhD.

=== Academic career ===
Stres was appointed a university instructor on 3 October 1974. He was later appointed an assistant professor (14 February 1977), an associate professor (7 September 1985), and a full professor (26 May 1990). From 1983 to 1993 he was the head of the Department of Philosophy, from 1985 to 1987 and from 1997 to 1999 the vice dean of faculty, and from October 1999 to September 2000 dean of the faculty. During his academic career he wrote 18 books or full-length publications and over 300 research articles.

=== Career in Church ===
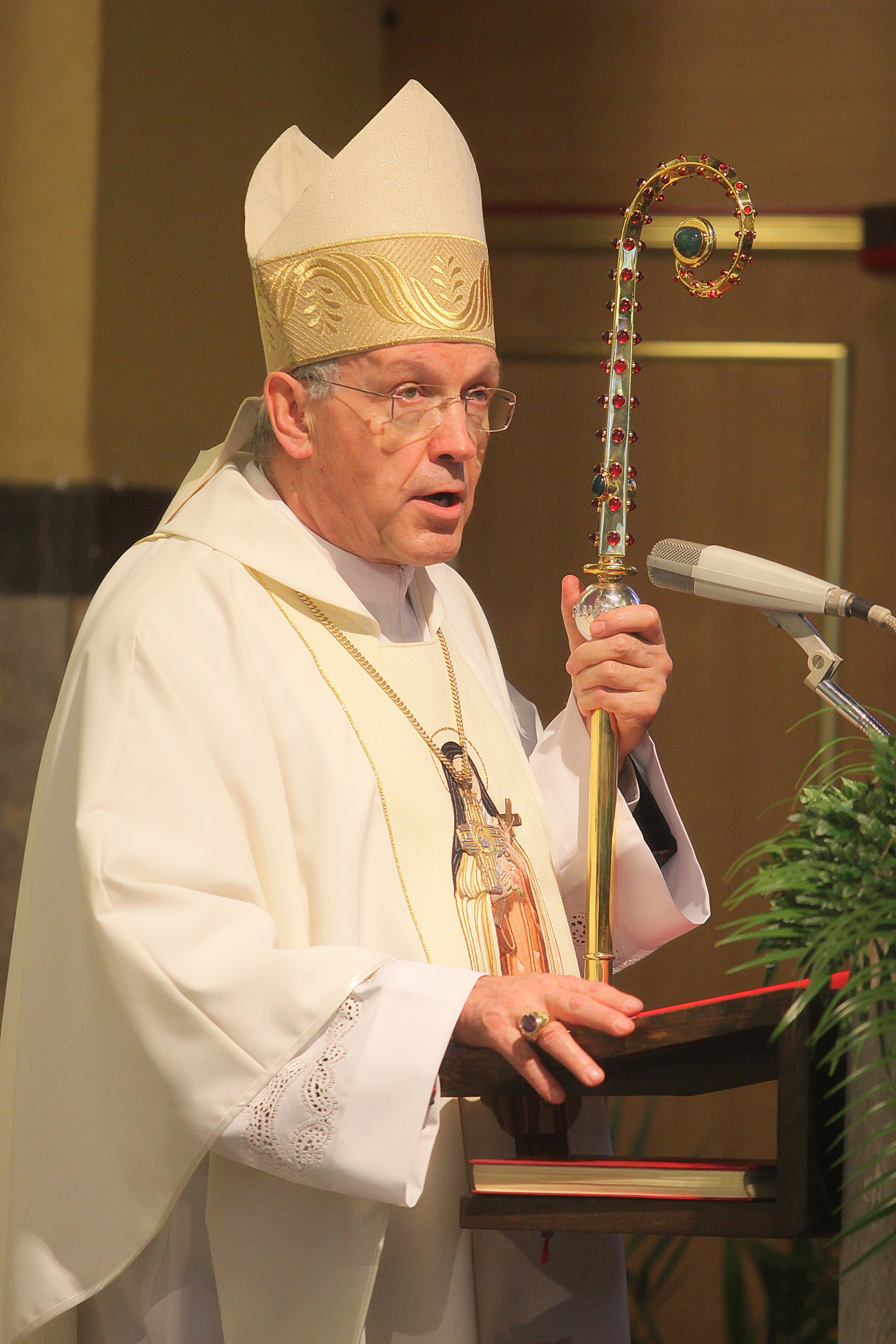
Anton Stres in 2012

Between 1988 and 1997, Stres was the provincial visitor to the Yugoslav Province of Congregation of the Mission, and after 1992 to the Slovenian Province of Congregation of the Mission.

From 1985 to 2010 he was also president of the Committee on Justice and Peace of the Slovenian Bishops' Conference.

Stres has also served as:

- Vice-president of the Conference of European Justice and Peace Commissions (1995–1999);
- Consultor of the Pontifical Council for Justice and Peace (since 1997);
- President of the Committee of the Slovenian Bishops' Conference for relations with the Republic of Slovenia (since 1997).

On 13 May 2000, Pope John Paul II appointed Stres the auxiliary bishop of Maribor and titular bishop of Poetovium. He was consecrated on 24 June in Maribor Cathedral with Archbishop Franc Kramberger as principal consecrator and Franc Cardinal Rodé, C.M. and Bishop Metod Pirih as principal co-consecrators.

In 2004 Stres became the representative of the Slovenian Bishops' Conference at the Commission of the Bishops' Conferences of the European Community, and in 2007 he was elected vice-president of the Slovenian Bishops' Conference.

On 7 April 2006, Pope Benedict XVI reorganized the Roman Catholic Church in Slovenia. Three new dioceses were formed (Celje, Murska Sobota, and Novo Mesto), and the Diocese of Maribor was elevated to an archdiocese and metropolitan see. He also appointed Stres as the first bishop of Celje; he was installed on 21 May 2006 in the Celje Cathedral. On 31 January 2009, Stres was appointed coadjutor archbishop of Maribor and at the same time he became apostolic administrator of Celje.

On 28 November 2009, Stres was appointed Metropolitan Archbishop of Ljubljana and Primate of Slovenia; Stres was installed on 24 January 2010. With this he also became the grand chancellor of his alma mater (the Faculty of Theology, Ljubljana).

Stres was also elected president of the Slovenian Bishops' Conference on 11 January 2010 and then again in 2012.

On 31 July 2013, Stres stepped down as the archbishop after the request by the Holy See due to his partial responsibility for the financial crisis of the Maribor Archdiocese. He was involved in its financial matters as the auxiliary bishop of Maribor.

== Other ==
Stres is a member of the Slovenian Catholic Girl Guides and Boy Scouts Association. During Slovenia's efforts to become independent, Stres became a founding member of the Committee for the Defence of Human Rights and later member of its collegium.

Catholic Church titles
Preceded by Alojz Uran	Archbishop of Ljubljana; 2010–2013	Succeeded by Stane Zore
Preceded by Alojz Uran	President of the Slovenian Bishops' Conference; 2010–2013	Succeeded by Andrej Glavan
