= Andrej Glavan =

Slovenian Roman Catholic prelate (born 1943)

Mons. Andrej Glavan
- Bishop of the Diocese of Novo Mesto
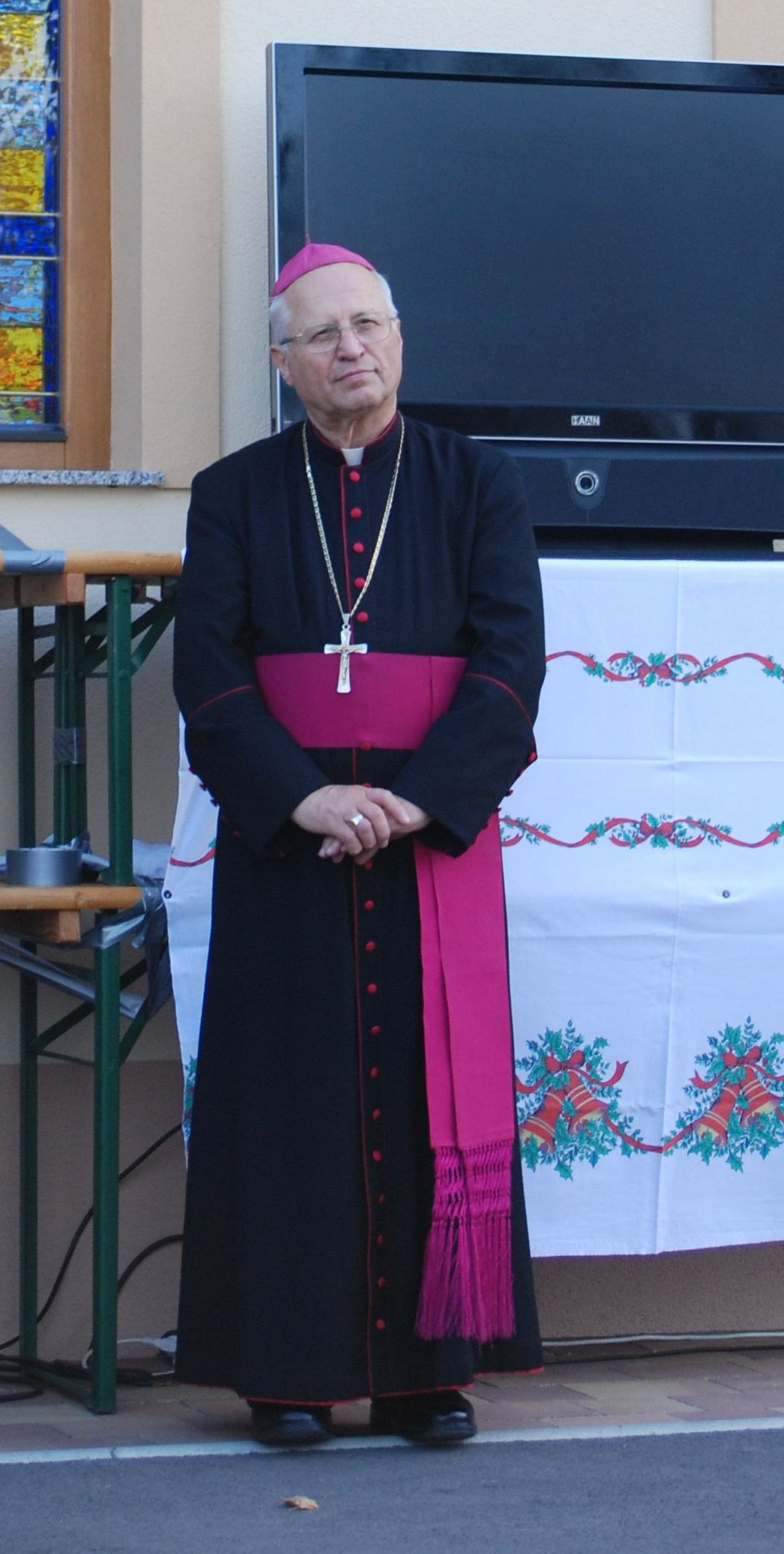
- Church: Roman Catholic Church
- Appointed: 7 April 2006
- Term ended: 30 June 2021
- Predecessor: New creation
- Successor: Andrej Saje
- Other posts: Titular Bishop of Musti in Numidia and Auxiliary Bishop of Archdiocese of Ljubljana (2000–2006), Apostolic Administrator of the Archdiocese of Ljubljana (2004, 2013–2014), President of the Episcopal Conference of Slovenia (2013–2017)

Orders
- Ordination: 29 June 1972
- Consecration: 12 June 2000 by Franc Rodé

Personal details
- Born: Andrej Glavan; 14 October 1943 (age 82) Ainöd, Adriatic Littoral, Nazi Germany (present day Soteska, Slovenia)
- Education: University of Ljubljana

Andrej Glavan (born 14 October 1943) is a Slovenian Roman Catholic prelate who served as the first bishop of the Diocese of Novo Mesto from its creation on 7 April 2006 until his retirement on 30 June 2021. Also, he was a Titular Bishop of Musti in Numidia and Auxiliary Bishop of the Archdiocese of Ljubljana from 13 May 2000 to 7 April 2006, an Apostolic Administrator during the vacancy of the Archdiocese of Ljubljana from 31 July 2013 to 23 November 2014, and president of the Episcopal Conference of Slovenia from 31 July 2013 to 13 March 2017.

== Education ==
Andrej Glavan was born into a Roman Catholic family near Dolenjske Toplice, during time of the Nazi occupation of Slovenia, in the present day Municipality of Dolenjske Toplice.

After finishing primary school in his native Soteska and graduation schools in Dolenjske Toplice and Kranj in 1961, he studied chemical technology at the University of Ljubljana with a diploma in 1966. After a few months of internship at the Iskra factory in Žužemberk and one-year of compulsory military service in the Yugoslavian Army, he entered to the Major Theological Seminary in Ljubljana, where graduated in 1972 and was ordained a priest on 29 June 1972 for the Roman Catholic Archdiocese of Ljubljana, after completed his philosophical and theological studies.

Coat of arms of Bishop Andrej Glavan

== Pastoral work ==
After his ordination Fr. Glavan was engaged in the pastoral work and served as a parish priest in Škofja Loka, Stara Loka and also established a new parish in Suha. During 1980–1990 and 1997–2000 he served as a Dean of the Škofja Loka deanery. He also held the position of vice-dean and was elected to the priestly council of the Archdiocese of Ljubljana. From 1998 he was a member of the Board of Counselors, and from the fall of 1998 to March 2005 he served as Archdeacon of the Ljubljana archdeaconry.

== Prelate ==
On 13 May 2000, he was appointed by Pope John Paul II as the a Titular Bishop of Musti in Numidia and Auxiliary Bishop of Archdiocese of Ljubljana. On 12 June 2000, he was consecrated as bishop by Metropolitan Archbishop Franc Rodé and other prelates of the Roman Catholic Church in the Cathedral of St. Nicholas in Ljubljana. From 2004 until 2006 he also was a Vicar General of the Archdiocese of Ljubljana. But on 7 April 2006 Bishop Glavan was transferred to the newly created Diocese of Novo Mesto.

Also he served two times as an Apostolic Administrator of the Archdiocese of Ljubljaba during its vacancy since 26 April 2004 until 5 December 2004 the first time, and from 31 July 2013 until 23 November 2014 the second time.

He actively works in the Episcopal Conference of Slovenia and from 31 July 2013 until 13 March 2017 was its President.

Pope Francis accepted his resignation on 30 June 2021.

Catholic Church titles
| Preceded by Salvatore Gristina | Titular Bishop of Musti in Numidia; 2000–2006 | Succeeded by Peter Štumpf |
| New title | Diocesan Bishop of Novo Mesto; 2006–2021 | Succeeded by Andrej Saje |
| Preceded by Franc Rode | Apostolic Administrator of the Archdiocese of Ljubljana; 2004 | Succeeded by Alojz Uran |
| Preceded by Anton Stres | Apostolic Administrator of the Archdiocese of Ljubljana; 2013–2014 | Succeeded by Stanislav Zore |
| Preceded by Anton Stres | President of the Episcopal Conference of Slovenia; 2013–2017 | Succeeded by Stanislav Zore |
