= Mitja Leskovar =

Slovenian priest of the Catholic Church (born 1970)

His Excellency, The Most Reverend Mitja Leskovar
- Apostolic Nuncio to Democratic Republic of the Congo; Titular Archbishop of Beneventum
- Church: Roman Catholic Church
- Appointed: 16 April 2024
- Predecessor: Ettore Balestrero
- Other post: Titular Archbishop of Beneventum
- Previous post: Apostolic Nuncio to Iraq (2020-2024)

Orders
- Ordination: 29 June 1995 by mgr Alojzij Šuštar
- Consecration: 8 August 2020 by Franc Rodé, Stanislav Zore and Jean-Marie Speich

Personal details
- Born: 3 January 1970 (age 56) Kranj, Slovenia
- Education: Pontifical Gregorian University
- Motto: Crux Lignum Vitae
- Coat of arms

Styles of Mitja Leskovar
- Reference style: His Excellency; The Most Reverend
- Spoken style: Your Excellency
- Religious style: Archbishop

Mitja Leskovar (born 3 January 1970) is a Slovenian priest of the Catholic Church who works in the diplomatic service of the Holy See.

== Biography ==
Mitja Leskovar was born in Kranj, Slovenia, on 3 January 1970 and grew up in Kokrica. He entered the seminary in Ljubljana in 1989, where he earned a degree in theology. He was ordained a priest of the Diocese of Ljubljana on 29 June 1995 from archbishop Alojzij Šuštar. After two years of pastoral work in Domžale, he continued his studies in Rome. He completed his master's degree in 1999 and earned a doctorate in canon law at the Pontifical Gregorian University.

== Diplomatic career ==
He joined the diplomatic service of the Holy See on 1 July 2001. His early assignments included stints in Bangladesh from 2001 to 2003, the General Affairs Section of the Secretariat of State in Rome from 2003 to 2014, Germany from 2015 to 2018, and India from 2018 to 2020.

While working in Rome in 2012, he was tasked with reforming Vatican security procedures after Pope Benedict XVI's butler was arrested for allegedly leaking documents to an Italian journalist. This included adding enhanced security features to employee badges, new restrictions on physical access, and managing the handling of sensitive documents.

On 1 May 2020, Pope Francis appointed him titular archbishop of Beneventum and Apostolic Nuncio to Iraq. He is one of three Slovenians active in the Vatican's diplomatic corps.

The date of his consecration as bishop was unscheduled because of the COVID-19 pandemic until 8 August 2020. He was consecrated by Cardinal Franc Rodé, co-consecrators the archbishop Stanislav Zore and the archbishop Jean-Marie Antoine Joseph Speich.

On 16 April 2024, Pope Francis appointed him as nuncio to the Democratic Republic of the Congo.

== Honours ==
- Officer's Cross of the Order of Merit of the Federal Republic of Germany, 25 July 2019

== See also ==
- List of heads of the diplomatic missions of the Holy See

dip
Preceded by Alberto Ortega Martín	Apostolic Nuncio to Iraq; 1 May 2020–16 April 2024	Succeeded by vacant
Preceded by Ettore Balestrero	Apostolic Nuncio to the Democratic Republic of the Congo; 16 April 2024–present	Succeeded by -
Preceded by Michael Czerny	Titular bishop of Beneventum; 1 May 2020–current	Succeeded by -
