= Soteska, Dolenjske Toplice =

Soteska
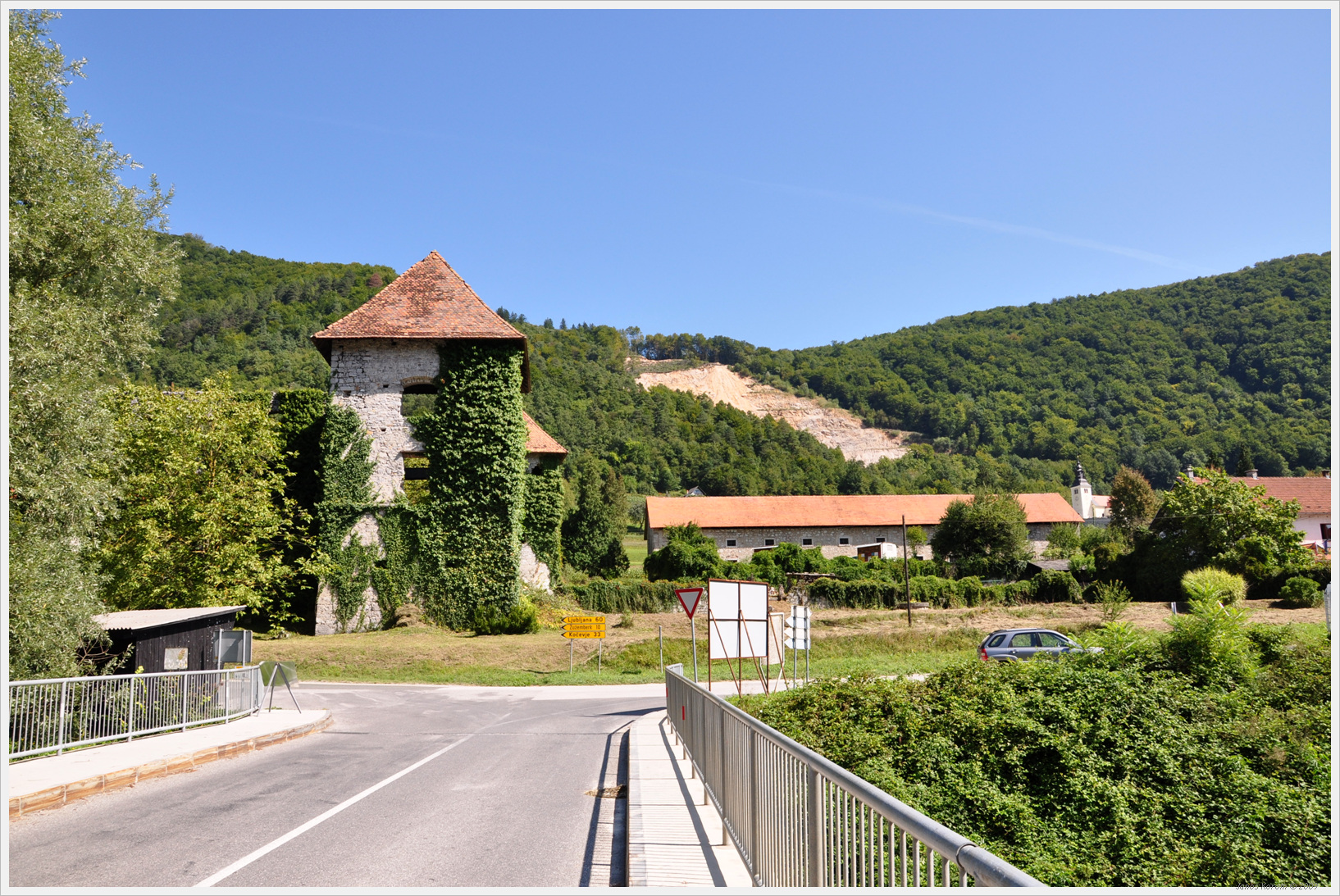

- Location in Slovenia
- Coordinates: 45°46′52.52″N 15°1′21.9″E
- Country: Slovenia
- Traditional region: Lower Carniola
- Statistical region: Southeast Slovenia
- Municipality: Dolenjske Toplice

Area
  - Total: 2.39 km^{2} (0.92 sq mi)
- Elevation: 216.9 m (712 ft)

Population (2020)
  - Total: 166
  - Density: 69.5/km^{2} (180/sq mi)

Soteska (pronounced [sɔˈteːska]; German: Ainöd) is a settlement on the left bank of the Krka River in the Municipality of Dolenjske Toplice in Slovenia. The area is part of the historical region of Lower Carniola. The municipality is now included in the Southeast Slovenia Statistical Region. Soteska includes the hamlet of Ključ southeast of the main settlement.

== Church ==
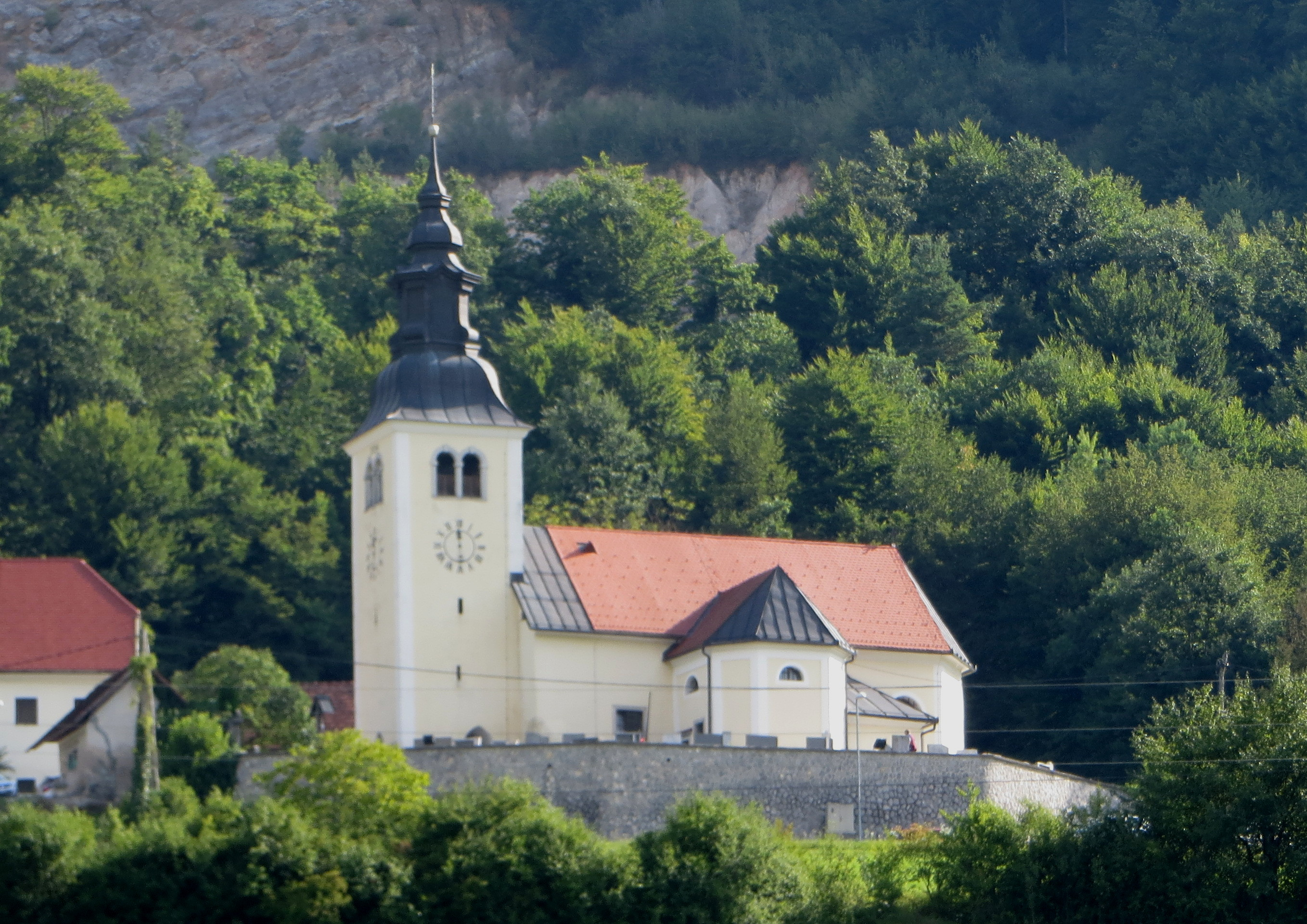
St. Erasmus's Church

The local parish church is dedicated to Saint Erasmus and belongs to the Roman Catholic Diocese of Novo Mesto. It is a medieval building that was restyled in the Baroque in the 17th century. The nave is barrel vaulted with an archivolt and spandrels. The chancel was reworked in the 19th century and has a semicircular coffered vault painted with figures by Franz Kurz von Goldenstein. The main altar is from the 19th century. The north side altar dates from the second half of the 18th century and features a painting by Valentin Metzinger (1699–1759). The south chapel contains an 18th-century altar.

== Landmarks ==
=== Soteska Mansion ===
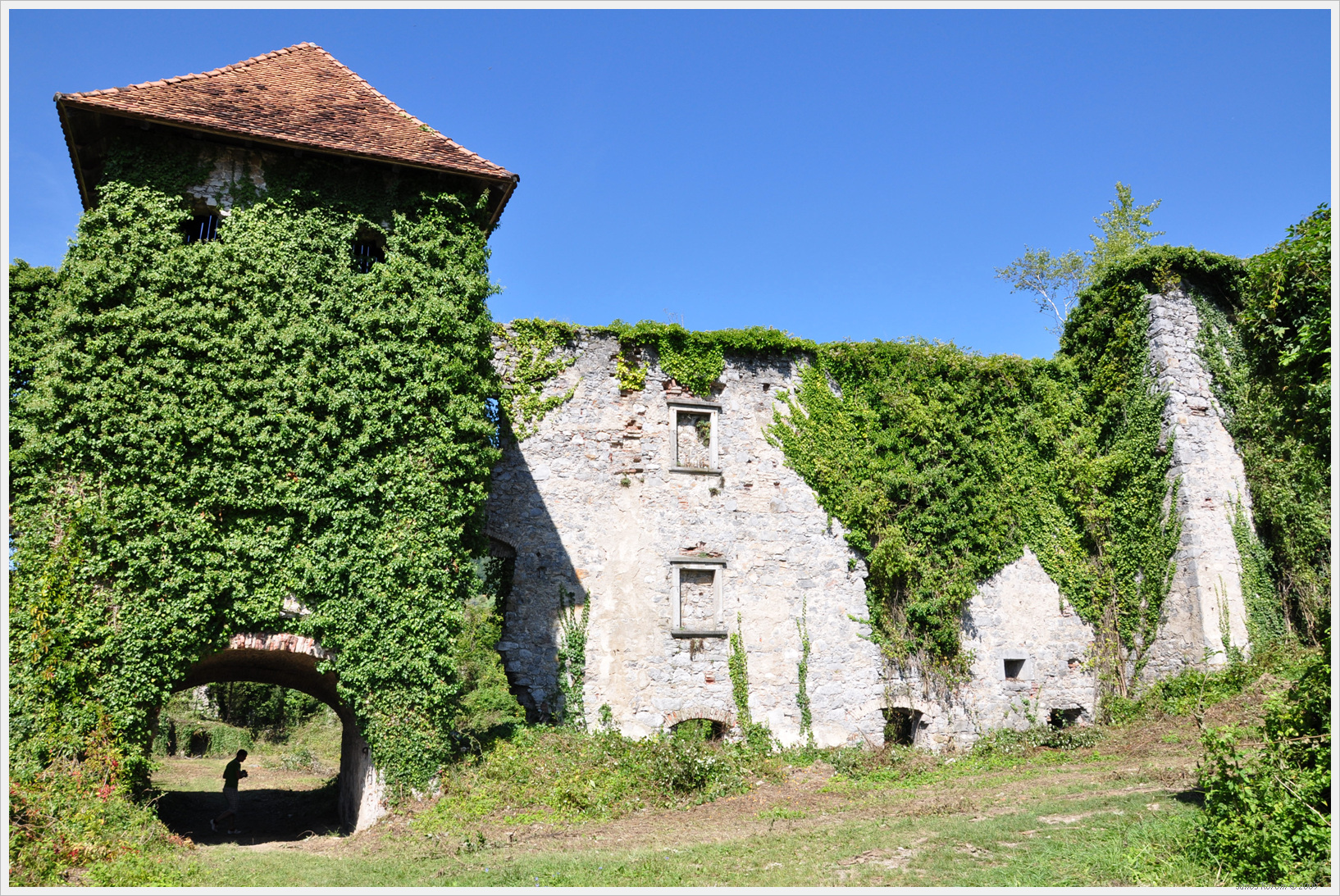
Ruins of Soteska Mansion

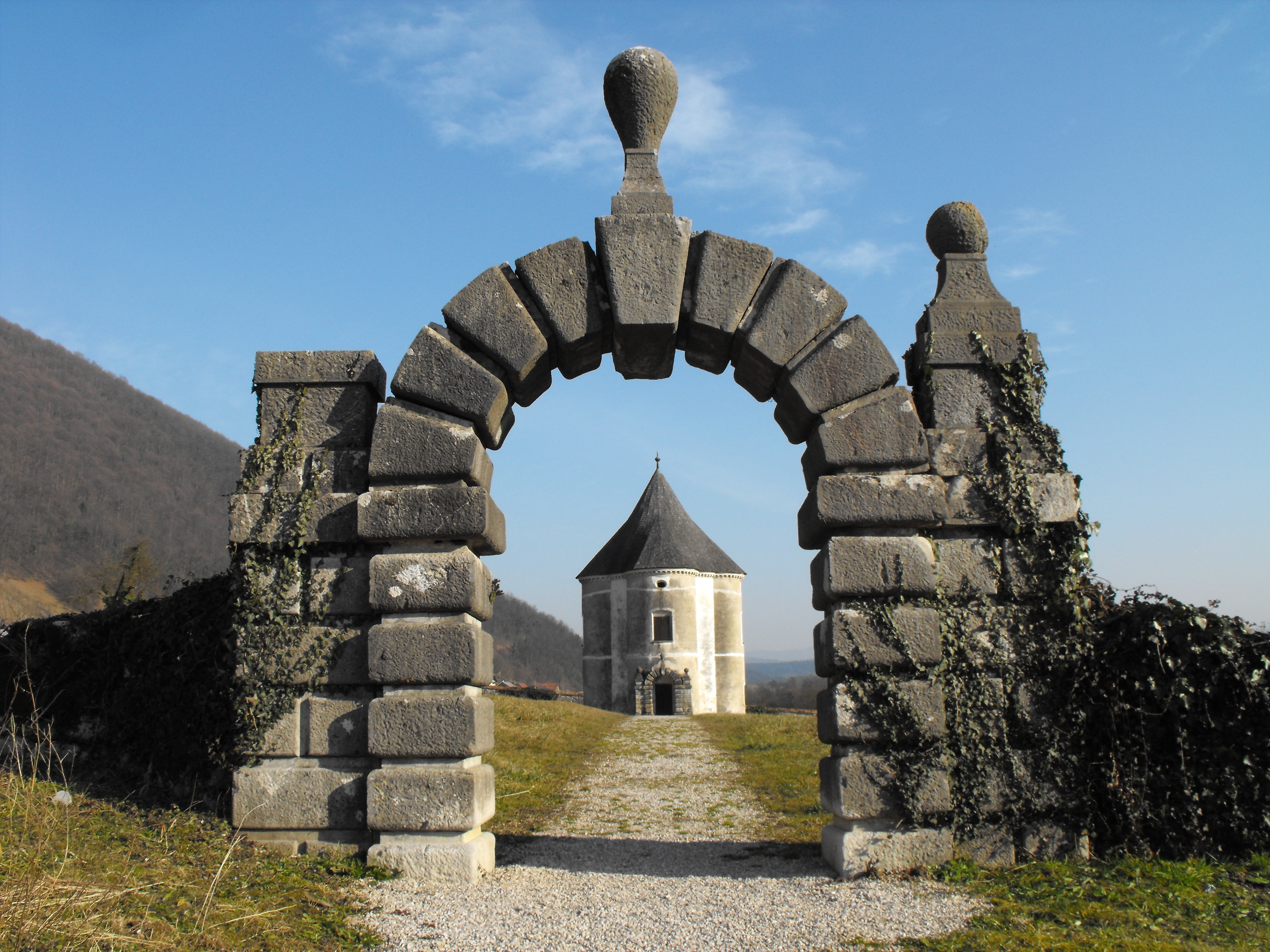
Gardens of Soteska Mansion

Whereas Soteska Mansion is now in ruins, the Baroque gardens with a pavilion survive. Another garden portal of the same shape stands in the courtyard of the Museum of Lower Carniola in Novo Mesto.

Soteska Mansion (German: Schloß Ainöd) is now a ruin. It stood on the banks of the Krka River and was built by Count Georg Sigmund von Gallenberg in 1664 and 1689. It had a rectangular layout with an interior courtyard bordered by four two-story arcades, and four rectangular towers at the corners. The entry tower bore the crest of the Gallenberg and Schrottenbach families and the year 1675. The interior was richly painted, with some works attributed to the 17th-century Dutch painter Almanach. Soteska Castle was characterized by Johann Weikhard von Valvasor as one of the most beautiful castles in Carniola. The castle was sold to the Auerspergs in 1733, and then to the Counts of Lichtenberg in 1743. The Auerspergs reacquired the castle in 1793 and owned it until the Second World War. The Partisans looted and burned the castle on 23 October 1943, and after the war many of the building stones were carried off. The gardens in the castle grounds survive, with a pavilion now referred to as the Devil's Tower (Slovene: Hudičev turn). The tower contains paintings by the 17th-century Dutch painter Almanach.

=== Old Soteska Castle ===
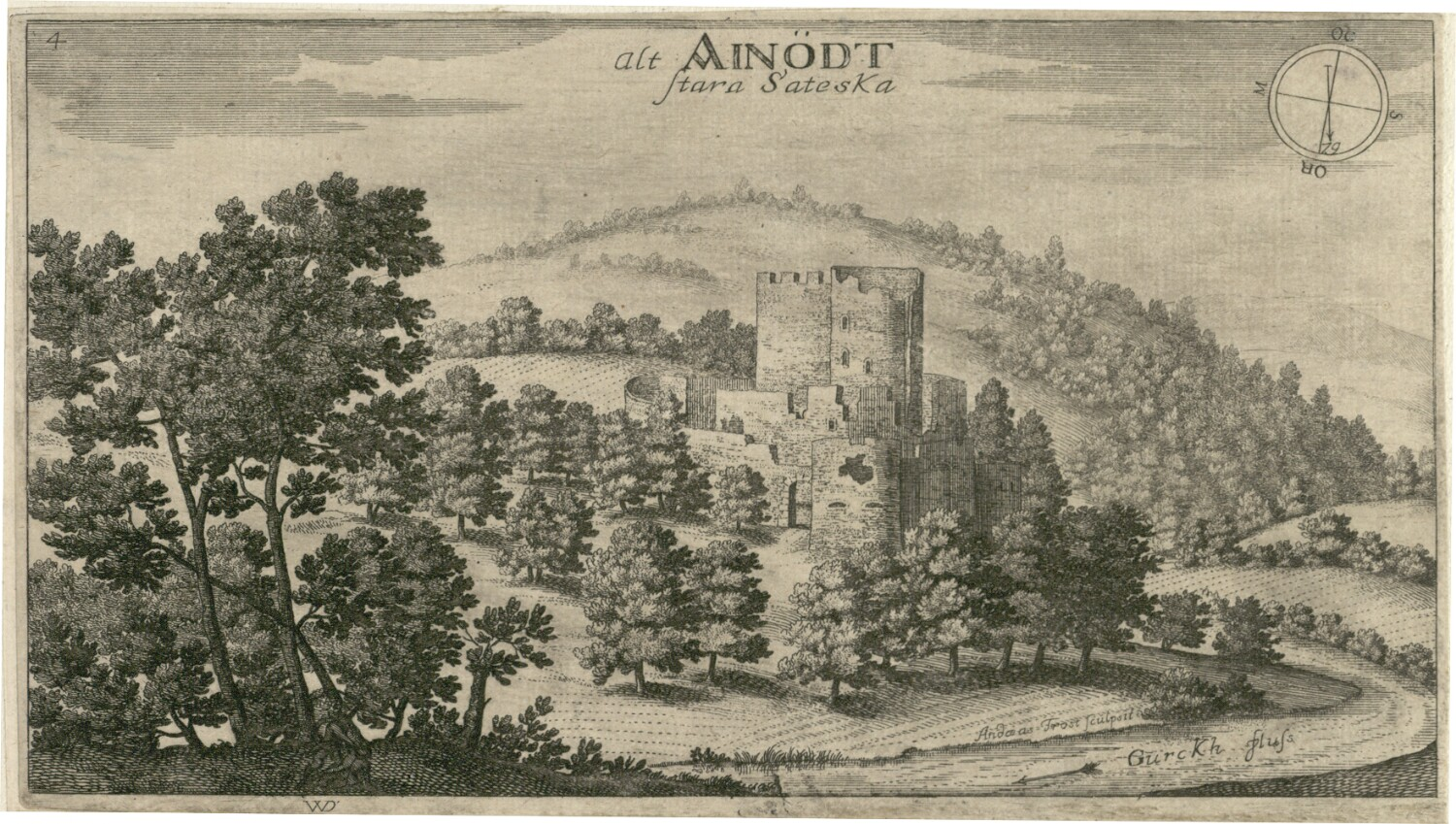
Old Soteska Castle as depicted by Johann Weikhard von Valvasor (1679)

The ruins of an older castle, known as Old Soteska Castle (Slovene: Stara Soteska, German: Alt Ainöd), stand on a nearby hill. It was initially owned by the Lords of Soteska, and then by the Istrian branch of the Counts of Gorizia from 1335 to 1374. A nobleman was killed at the castle in the peasant uprising of 1573. The Lords of Scheyer, lieges of the Habsburgs, held the castle after this; they were enthusiastic Protestants during the Reformation, and one of them even supervised the Protestant schools and received a red leather-bound copy of the Dalmatin Bible in 1584. The castle was strongly fortified during the Ottoman wars in Europe and was the seat of a provincial court. The Scheyer family died out in 1650 and was succeeded by the Gallenbergs. Count Georg Sigmund von Gallenberg had the old castle razed when the new castle was built.

== Notable people ==
Notable people that were born or lived in Soteska include:

- Andrej Glavan (born 1943), Slovenian Roman Catholic prelate
- Jožef Rudolf Milic (1817–1888), printer and publisher
- Mansvet Šmajdek (1819–1868), religious writer
