= Grmada, Trebnje =

Grmada
- Location in Slovenia
- Coordinates: 45°53′51.04″N 14°59′1.98″E
- Country: Slovenia
- Traditional region: Lower Carniola
- Statistical region: Southeast Slovenia
- Municipality: Trebnje

Area
  - Total: 0.63 km^{2} (0.24 sq mi)
- Elevation: 440.7 m (1,446 ft)

Population (2002)
  - Total: 29

Grmada (pronounced [ɡəɾˈmaːda]) is a small village in the Municipality of Trebnje in eastern Slovenia. It lies in the hills south of Trebnje, on the local road leading to Dobrnič. The area is part of the historical region of Lower Carniola. The municipality is now included in the Southeast Slovenia Statistical Region.

Alojzij Šuštar, who was the archbishop of Ljubljana from 1980 to 1997, was born in Grmada.
