= Alojzij Cvikl =

Slovenian Catholic priest

His Excellency The Most Reverend Mons. Alojzij Cvikl, S.J.
- Archbishop of Archdiocese of Maribor
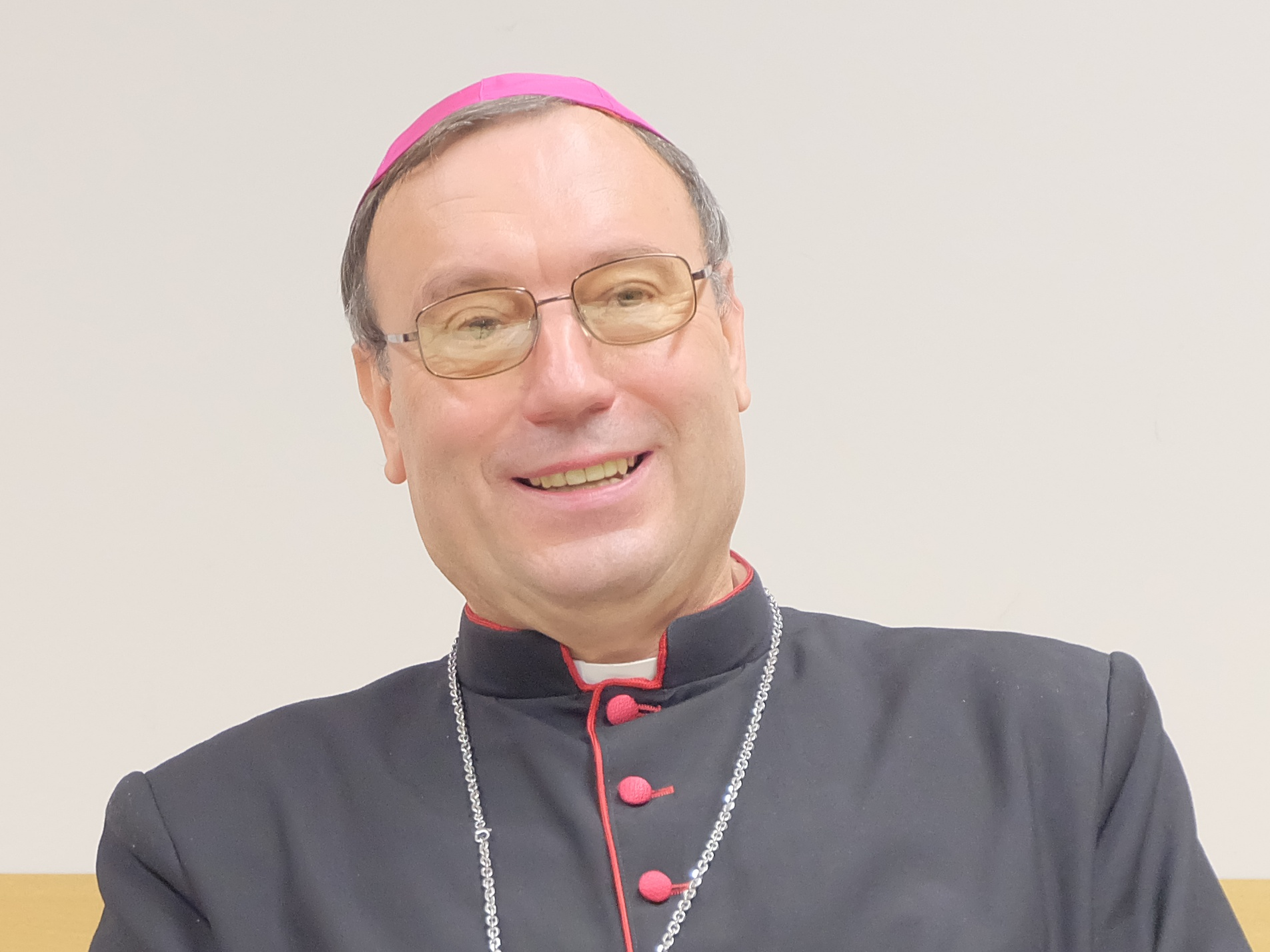
- Church: Roman Catholic Church
- Appointed: 14 March 2015
- Term ended: Incumbent
- Predecessor: Stanislav Lipovšek (as Apostolic Administrator)
- Previous post: Rector of the Collegium Russicum (2001–2010)

Orders
- Ordination: 3 July 1983 (Priest) by Jožef Smej
- Consecration: 26 April 2015 (Bishop) by Juliusz Janusz

Personal details
- Born: Alojzij Cvikl; 19 June 1955 (age 71) Vizore, FPR Yugoslavia (present day Slovenia)
- Education: University of Ljubljana, Pontifical Gregorian University

Archbishop Alojzij Cvikl, S.J. (born 19 June 1955) is a Slovenian Roman Catholic prelate who serves as an archbishop of Archdiocese of Maribor since 14 March 2015.

== Education ==
Archbishop Cvikl was born into a simple peasant-worker family near Nova Cerkev in the Municipality of Vojnik.

After finishing primary school, which he attended in Nova Cerkev and Dobrna and graduation a classical gymnasium #2 in Maribor in 1974, he joined a religious order of the Society of Jesus and after the novitiate, that he mast interrupt because of compulsory military service in the Yugoslav Army in 1976, Alojzij consequently studied at the Theological faculty at the University of Ljubljana from 1977 and continued his studies at the Pontifical Gregorian University in Rome, Italy from 1980. He professed as a Jesuit and was ordained as priest on 3 July 1983 by bishop Jožef Smej, after completed his philosophical and theological studies.

Coat of arms of Archbishop Alojzij Cvikl

== Pastoral and educational work ==
After his ordination Fr. Cvikl served as a chaplain in the parish of Ljubljana-Dravlje and after that continued his postgraduate studies at the Lumen Vitae Faculty of the Saint-Louis University in Brussels, Belgium from 1988 until 1990 with a master's degree of the pedagogy. From 1990 to 1993 he again served as a parish priest of Ljubljana-Dravlje.

From 1993 he worked atin the field of education in Ljubljana and also from 1995 until 2001 was a Provincial of the Slovenian Province of the Society of Jesus. In January 1996, he became President of the Association of Senior Ordinary Supervisors. During his presidency, the Association was renamed the Conference of Religious Institutions of Slovenia in 1999. After that he served as the Rector of the Pontifical Collegium Russicum in Rome (2001–2010), but in 2010 returned to Slovenia and worked as an economist of the Archdiocese of Maribor.

== Prelate ==
On 14 March 2015, he was appointed by Pope Francis as an archbishop of the Archdiocese of Maribor. On 26 April 2015, he was consecrated as bishop by Archbishop Juliusz Janusz and other prelates of the Roman Catholic Church in the Cathedral of Saint John the Baptist in Maribor. The same year, he was also elected as president of Caritas Slovenia.

On 13 March 2017 in Koper, the Slovenian bishops elected Archbishop Cvikl as the vice-president of the Episcopal Conference of Slovenia for a term of five years and on 24 March 2022 he was replaced at this office by Bishop Peter Štumpf.

Catholic Church titles
| Preceded by Richard Čemus | Rector of the Pontifical Collegium Russicum; 2001–2010 | Succeeded by Lionginas Virbalas |
| Preceded by Stanislav Lipovšek (as Apostolic Administrator) | Archbishop of Roman Catholic Archdiocese of Maribor; 2015–present | Incumbent |
