= San Francesco Saverio alla Garbatella =

- Church of Saint Francis Xavier in Garbatella
- Chiesa di San Francesco Saverio alla Garbatella
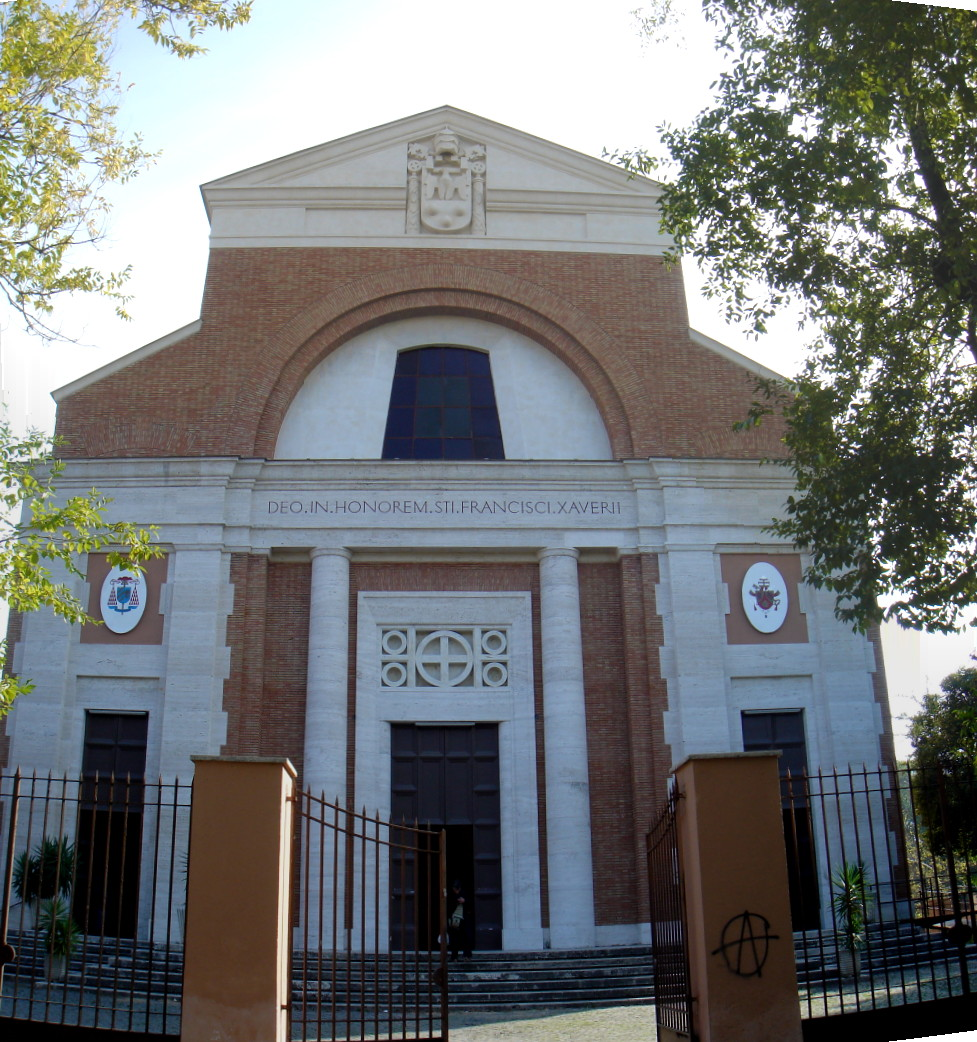
- The facade, which faces onto Piazza Sauli

- Location within Rome
- 41°51′43″N 12°29′22″E
- Location: Via Cristoforo Borri 2, Ostiense, Rome
- Country: Italy
- Language: Italian
- Denomination: Catholic
- Tradition: Roman Rite
- Website: sanfrancescosaverioroma.it

History
- Status: titular church, parish church
- Dedication: Francis Xavier
- Consecrated: 1933

Architecture
- Functional status: active
- Architect: Alberto Calza Bini
- Architectural type: Renaissance Revival, Rationalist
- Groundbreaking: 1931
- Completed: 1933

Administration
- Diocese: Rome

San Francesco Saverio alla Garbatella is a 20th-century parochial church and titular church in southern Rome, dedicated to Francis Xavier.

== History ==
San Francesco Saverio alla Garbatella was built in 1931–33.

Karol Wojtyła, later Pope John Paul II, ministered in the church after the Second World War; it was the first church in Rome that he visited after being elected Pope in 1978. Pope Paul VI also visited in 1976.

On 21 February 2001, it was made a titular church to be held by a cardinal-deacon.

Cardinal-protectors

- Leo Scheffczyk (2001–2006)
- Franc Rodé (2006–present); made a cardinal-priest in 2016, title elevated to a cardinal-priesthood pro hac vice

== Structure ==
On a Latin cross plan, the facade is covered in brick and decorated with travertine pilasters. The main entrance is framed by Doric columns. On the entablature there is a large lunette, inside a circular arch. The tympanum carries the arms of Pope Pius XII.

The dome is of reinforced concrete, decorated with arched windows; it is painted in gray, in imitation of lead Baroque domes. It is surmounted by a simple roof lantern. The interior is divided into three naves, delimited by Ionic columns; the barrel vault is coffered in stucco.

The right transept has a fresco of the Madonna of Divine Love and commemorates the 1943 bombing of San Lorenzo, Rome. The apse holds a canvas painting of Francis Xavier preaching in Goa.
