= Župeča Vas =

- Location in Slovenia
- Coordinates: 45°53′4.18″N 15°31′41.18″E
- Country: Slovenia
- Traditional region: Lower Carniola
- Statistical region: Lower Sava
- Municipality: Brežice

Area
  - Total: 1.93 km^{2} (0.75 sq mi)
- Elevation: 153.2 m (503 ft)

Population (2020)
  - Total: 201
  - Density: 104/km^{2} (270/sq mi)

Župeča Vas (pronounced [ʒuˈpeːtʃa ˈʋaːs]; Slovene: Župeča vas, German: Supetschendorf) is a village on the right bank of the Krka River, east of Cerklje ob Krki in the Municipality of Brežice in eastern Slovenia. The area is part of the traditional region of Lower Carniola. It is now included with the rest of the municipality in the Lower Sava Statistical Region.

Ancient Roman artefacts, mostly masonry, have been found in the area, mostly in the location of a destroyed medieval church dedicated Saint Alexander, mentioned in written documents dating to 1274, but already destroyed by the 17th century.
