= Donačka Gora =

- Location in Slovenia
- Coordinates: 46°15′28.6″N 15°43′52.75″E
- Country: Slovenia
- Traditional region: Styria
- Statistical region: Savinja
- Municipality: Rogatec

Area
  - Total: 3.49 km^{2} (1.35 sq mi)
- Elevation: 418.7 m (1,374 ft)

Population (2002)
  - Total: 185

Donačka Gora (pronounced [dɔˈnaːtʃka ˈɡɔːɾa]; German: Donatiberg) is a settlement east of the town of Rogatec in eastern Slovenia. It lies south of a hill with the same name. The area is part of the traditional region of Styria and is now included in the Savinja Statistical Region.

The local church, from which the hill and the settlement get their name, is dedicated to Saint Donatus and belongs to the Parish of Rogatec. It was built between 1720 and 1730 and vaulted in 1843.

== Notable people ==
Notable people that were born or lived in Donačka Gora include:

- Anton Stres (born 1942), Archbishop of Ljubljana
