= Stanislav Zore =

20th and 21st-century Slovenian Catholic Archbishop

His Excellency Stanislav (Stane) Zore OFM
- Metropolitan Archbishop of Ljubljana
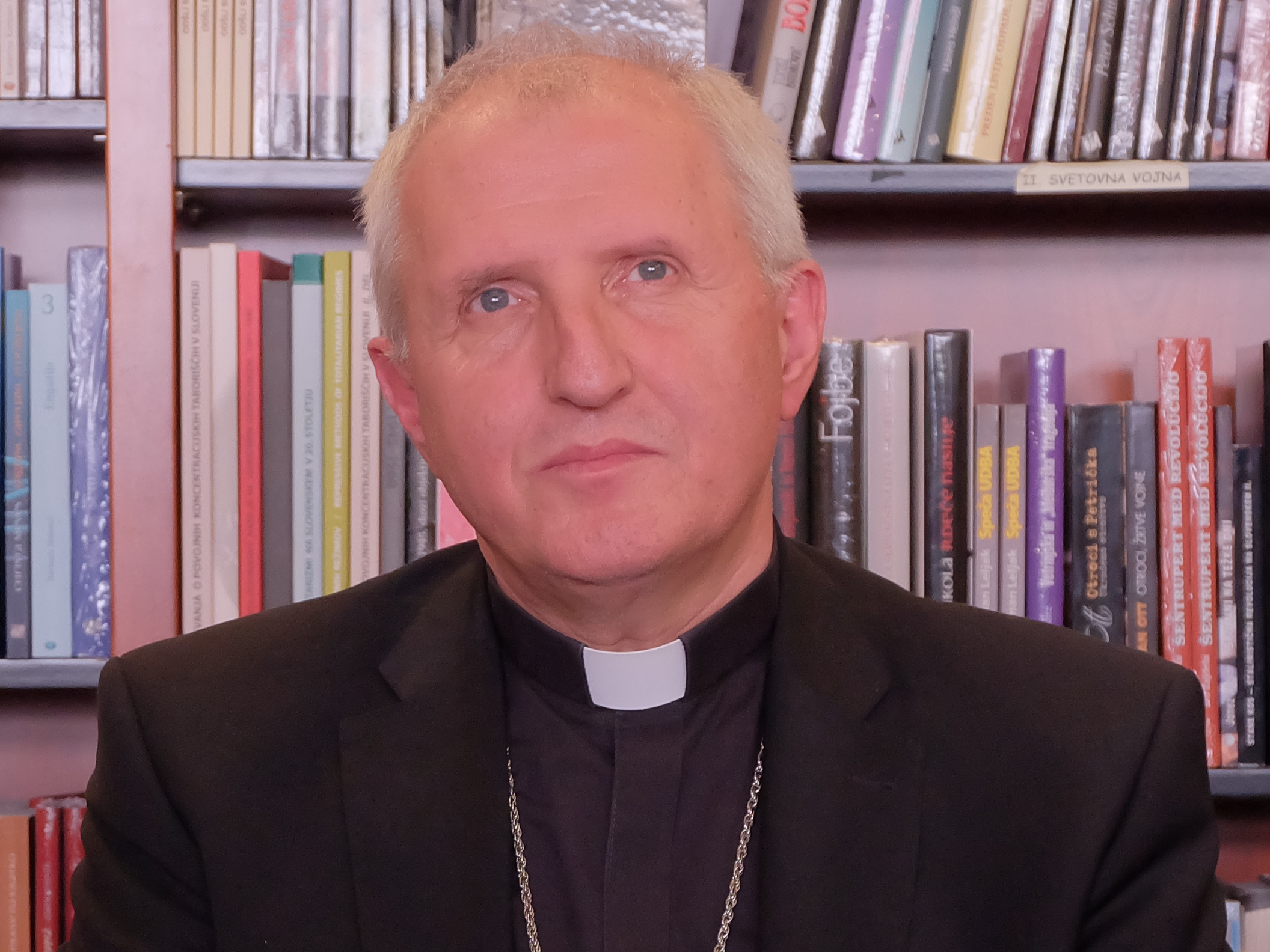
- Church: Roman Catholic Church
- Archdiocese: Ljubljana
- Appointed: 4 October 2014
- Installed: 23 November 2014
- Predecessor: Anton Stres

Orders
- Ordination: 29 June 1985
- Consecration: 23 November 2014 by Juliusz Janusz; Andrej Glavan; Stanislav Lipovšek

Personal details
- Born: 7 September 1958 (age 67) Znojile, Upper Carniola, Socialist Republic of Slovenia
- Denomination: Roman Catholic
- Residence: Ljubljana
- Profession: Theologian
- Education: University of Ljubljana

Stanislav (Stane) Zore, O.F.M. (born 7 September 1958), is a Slovenian prelate of the Catholic Church who has been the archbishop of Ljubljana since 2014.

== Biography ==
Stane Zore was born on 7 September 1958 in Znojile, a village in Sela pri Kamniku in Upper Carniola in what was then the Socialist Republic of Slovenia, Yugoslavia. His father was a miner in the chalk mine in Črna in Tuhinjska valley and his mother managed the family farm. Stane had three siblings. He went to school there and in Kamnik and graduated from Serafin College in Kamnik in 1977. He then entered the Franciscan novitiate at Kostanjevica in Nova Gorica and took his first vows in 1978. He studied philosophy and theology at the Faculty of Theology in Ljubljana from 1977 to 1984 in two stages, interrupted beginning in 1980 by his military service in Koprivnica and Varaždin. On 4 October 1984 he took solemn vows in the Order of Friars Minor. He was ordained a priest on 29 June 1985.

He was parish vicar, parish priest, rector of the national sanctuary of Brezje and of Sveta Gora, guardian in various fraternities and master of novices. From 1998 to 2004 he was Provincial Minister of the Franciscan Province of Santa Croce in Slovenia. He served as Provincial Minister of his order again from 2011 to 2015, and in 2014 he was President of the Conference of Men and Women Religious in Slovenia (KORUS).

Pope Francis named him archbishop of Ljubljana on 4 October 2014. He received him episcopal consecration there on 23 November from Archbishop Juliusz Janusz, Apostolic Nuncio to Slovenia. He was the 36th ordinary of Ljubljana, and the first Franciscan.

From 2017 to 2022 he served a five-year term as head of the Slovenian Episcopal Conference.

Zore is the Grand Prior of the Slovenian Lieutenancy of the Equestrian Order of the Holy Sepulchre of Jerusalem. As the archbishop of Ljubljana he is also the Grand Chancellor of the Faculty of Theology of the University of Ljubljana.

Catholic Church titles
Preceded by Andrej Glavan (as Apostolic Administrator)	Archbishop of Ljubljana; 2014–	Incumbent
Preceded by Andrej Glavan	President of the Slovenian Bishops' Conference; 2017–2022	Succeeded by Andrej Saje
