= Andrej Saje =

Slovenian Roman Catholic prelate

Mons. Andrej Saje
- Bishop of the Diocese of Novo Mesto
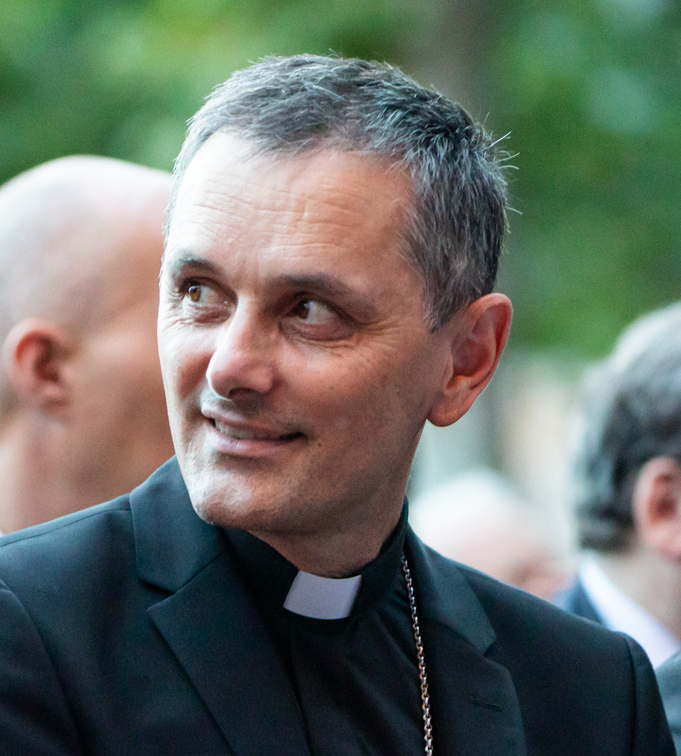
- Church: Roman Catholic Church
- Appointed: 30 June 2021
- Predecessor: Andrej Glavan
- Successor: Incumbent
- Other post: President of the Episcopal Conference of Slovenia (2022–)

Orders
- Ordination: 29 June 1992
- Consecration: 26 September 2021 by Andrej Glavan

Personal details
- Born: 22 April 1966 (age 60) Novo Mesto, SFR Yugoslavia (present day Slovenia)
- Education: University of Ljubljana, Pontifical Gregorian University
- Coat of arms

Andrej Saje (born 22 April 1966) is a Slovenian Roman Catholic prelate who is currently serving as the second bishop of the Diocese of Novo Mesto since 30 June 2021 and a president of the Episcopal Conference of Slovenia since 24 March 2022.

== Early life and education ==
Andrej Saje was born into a Roman Catholic family of Drago and Frančiška (née Ulčar) Saje in Novo Mesto as their first child, but grew up in Veliki Kal in the parish of Mirna Peč.

After finishing primary school in Mirna Peč (1973–1981) and graduation gymnasium in Novo Mesto in 1985, he made a one-year of compulsory military service in the Yugoslavian Army (1985–1986). He then entered to the Major Theological Seminary in Ljubljana and in the same time joined the Theological Faculty at the University of Ljubljana, where he graduated in 1991 and was ordained a priest on 29 June 1992, for the Roman Catholic Archdiocese of Ljubljana, after completed his philosophical and theological studies.

== Pastoral and educational work ==
After his ordination Fr. Saje was engaged in the pastoral work and served as a parish priest in Grosuplje (1992–1994) and from 1994 until 1997 was a personal assistant of the Metropolitan Archbishop of Ljubljana. In summer 1997 he continued his education in the Collegium Germanicum et Hungaricum and completed his studies with a Doctor of Theology degree in Canon law at the Pontifical Gregorian University in 2003.

After returning to Slovenia, he was general secretary and spokesman for the Episcopal Conference of Slovenia for ten years (2003–2013) and served as a prefect of Studies at the Theological Seminary in Ljubljana (2003–2016). He was appointed a judge of the Metropolitan Church Court in 2003, and in 2016 the judicial vicar of the same court and the judicial vicar of the Archdiocese of Ljubljana. Fr, Saje also was an assistant professor and after professor at the Department of Canon Law at the Faculty of Theology, University of Ljubljana.

He served as a spiritual assistant in the parish of Ljubljana-Ježica (2013–2015) and from 2014 until the summer of 2021, when he was appointed bishop, he was a spiritual assistant in Slovenian parishes in Sele and Bajdiše in the Klagenfurt-Land District of the Austrian Roman Catholic Diocese of Gurk.

== Bishop ==
On 30 June 2021, he was appointed by Pope Francis as the second bishop of the Diocese of Novo Mesto. On 26 September 2021, he was consecrated as bishop by Bishop Andrej Glavanin the St. Kancijan Church in Mirna Peč and two days later, on 28 September 2021, was installed.

Since 24 March 2022 Saje has been the president of the Episcopal Conference of Slovenia

Catholic Church titles
Preceded by Andrej Glavan	Diocesan Bishop of Novo Mesto; 2021–present	Incumbent
Preceded by Stanislav Zore	President of the Slovenian Bishops' Conference; 2022–present	Incumbent
