= Rodica, Domžale =

Rodica
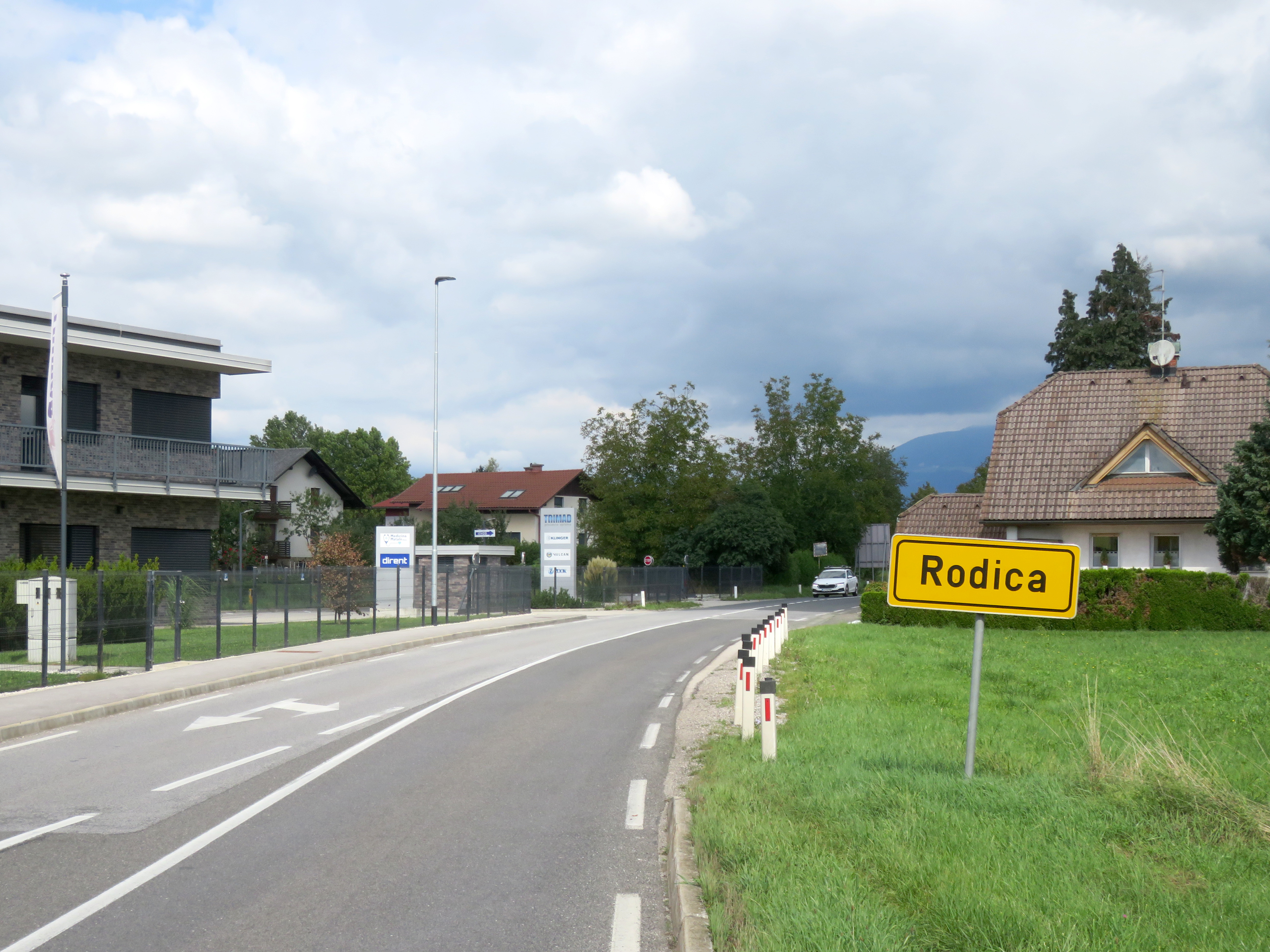

- Location in Slovenia
- Coordinates: 46°8′53.5″N 14°35′39.45″E
- Country: Slovenia
- Traditional region: Upper Carniola
- Statistical region: Central Slovenia
- Municipality: Domžale

Area
  - Total: 0.37 km^{2} (0.14 sq mi)
- Elevation: 305.3 m (1,002 ft)

Population (2020)
  - Total: 864
  - Density: 2,300/km^{2} (6,000/sq mi)

Rodica (pronounced [ɾɔˈdiːtsa]) is a settlement on the outskirts of Domžale in the Upper Carniola region of Slovenia. It includes the hamlet of Groblje (German: Ebensfeld).

== Name ==
Rodica was attested in historical sources as Rodiza in 1232, Radicz in 1426, Rodiczs in 1428, and Rodin in 1467, among other spellings.

== Church ==
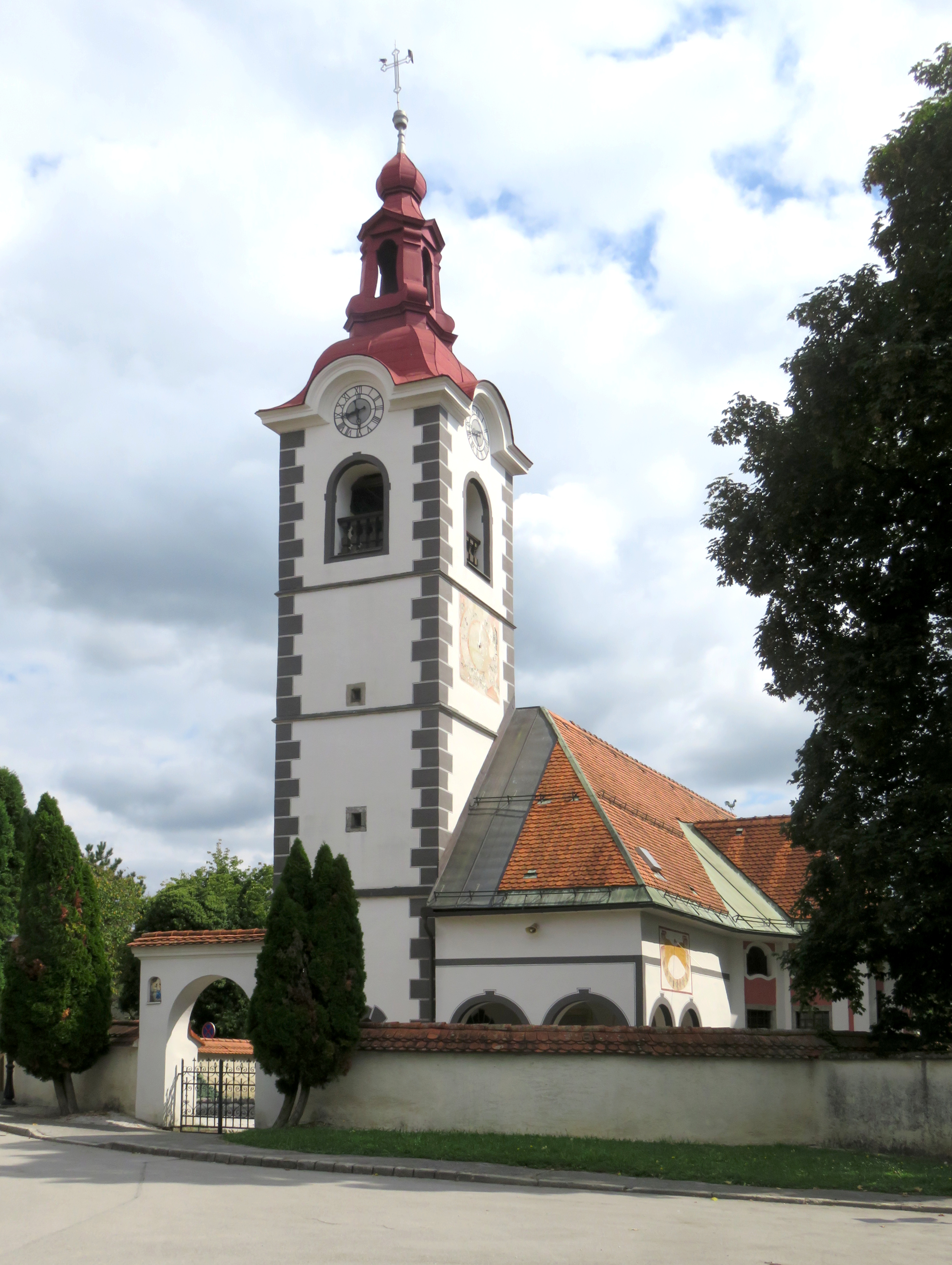
Saints Hermagoras and Fortunatus Church

The local parish church is built in the hamlet of Groblje in the settlement and is dedicated to Saints Hermagoras and Fortunatus. It was first mentioned in documents dating to 1526. In the late 18th century the church became the Carniolan centre of worship of Saint Notburga, a patron saint of peasants. At this time the original late Gothic church was rebuilt in the Baroque style and its interior fully painted with frescos by the painter Franc Jelovšek.

The church was taken over by the Congregation of the Mission in 1920, which opened a missionary center in it. In 1948, the church was confiscated by the new communist government and nationalized. Between 1945 and 1959, the church housed a warehouse for the Groblje agricultural estate. In 1960, the choir loft was removed, until 1978 it was used only for concerts, and then between 1979 and 1986 only for Sunday masses. In 1986, the Municipality of Domžale leased the church to the Parish of Jarše for 99 years, and in 1995 it was denationalized and became the property of the parish again. Between 1998 and 2002 all five altars and the pulpit were restored. In 2005, the choir loft was rebuilt based on plans by the architects Rok Benda and Miha Skok, and in 2006 the Močnik Organ Works installed a new organ.

== Notable people ==
Notable people that were born or lived in Rodica include:

- Alojzij (Lojze) Mav (1898–1977), composer
- Franc Rode (born 1934), cardinal
- Anton Šubelj (1899–1965), singer and musician
- Alenka Gotar (born 1977), soprano, represented Slovenia in the 2007 Eurovision Song Contest
