= Znojile, Kamnik =

Znojile
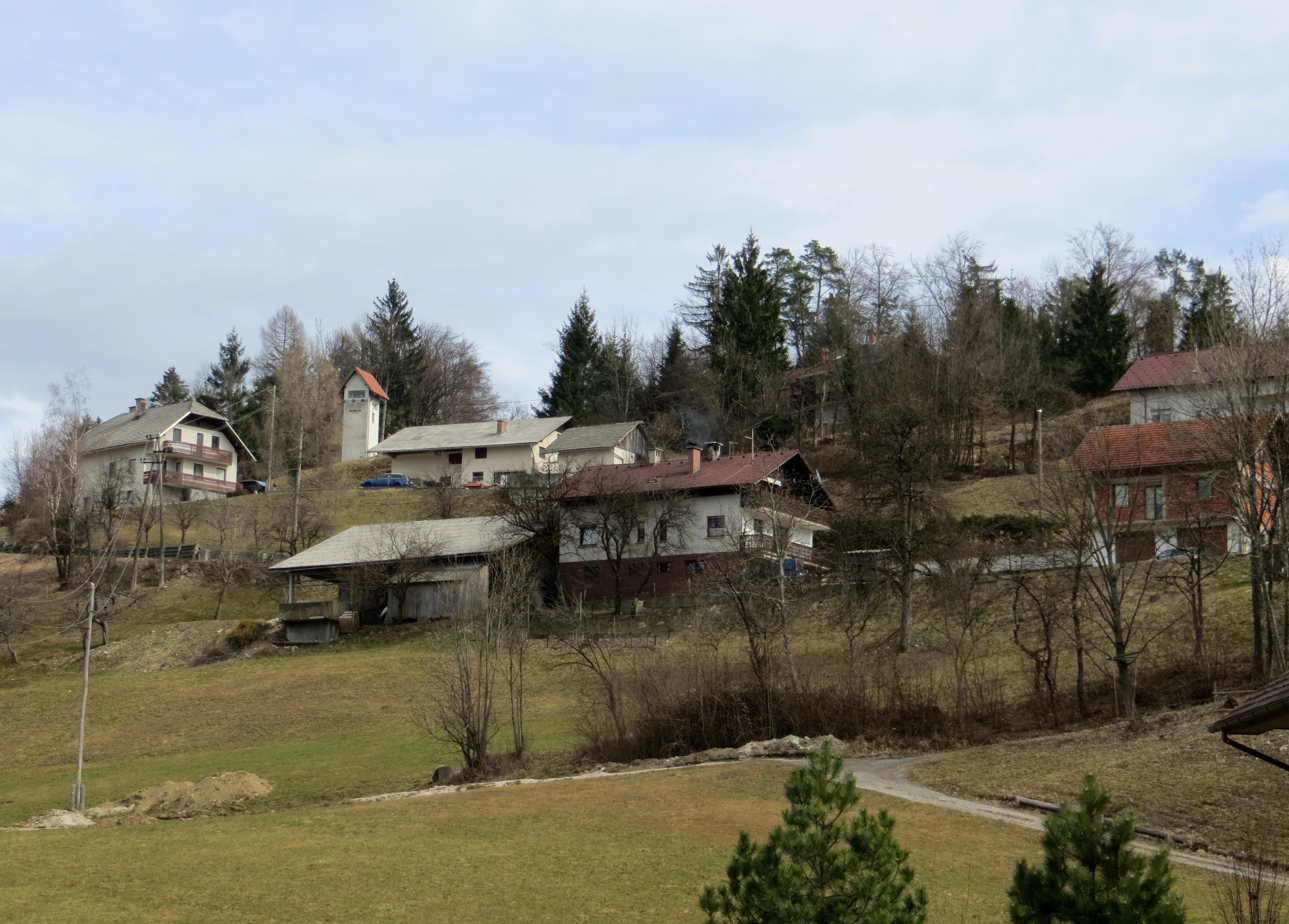

- Location in Slovenia
- Coordinates: 46°14′13.95″N 14°41′26.72″E
- Country: Slovenia
- Traditional region: Upper Carniola
- Statistical region: Central Slovenia
- Municipality: Kamnik

Area
  - Total: 0.43 km^{2} (0.17 sq mi)
- Elevation: 587.8 m (1,928 ft)

Population (2002)
  - Total: 24

Znojile (pronounced [znɔˈjiːlɛ]; German: Snoile) is a small settlement in the hills above the Tuhinj Valley east of Kamnik in the Upper Carniola region of Slovenia.

== Name ==
Znojile was attested in written sources circa 1400 as Snoynl (and as Snoyll in 1477). The name is derived from *znoji(d)lo 'sunny or sun-facing area' from the verb *znojiti 'to be warmed by the sun'. The name therefore refers to the geographical orientation of the place.
