= Stara Loka =

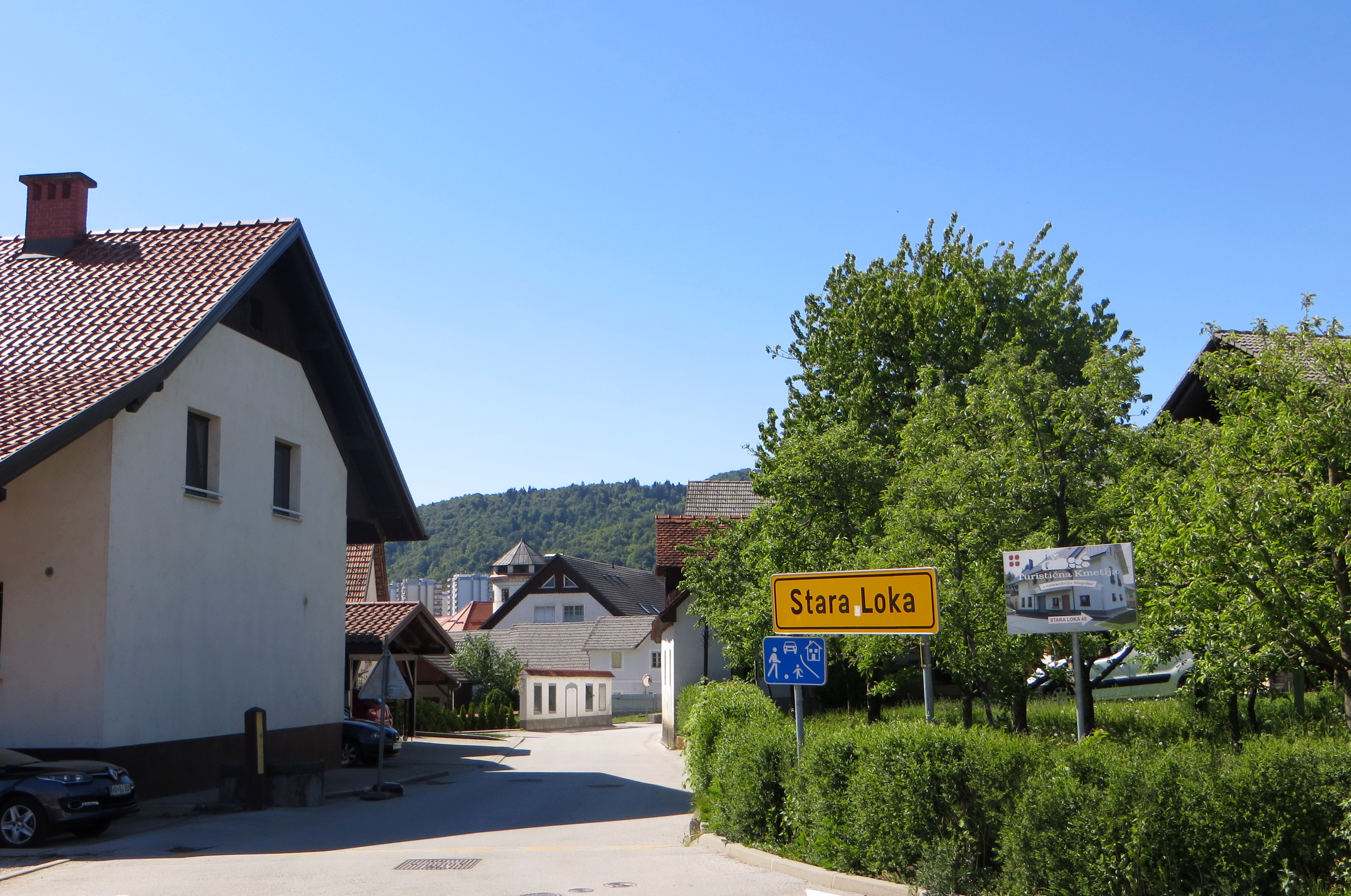

- Location in Slovenia
- Coordinates: 46°10′21.71″N 14°18′5.57″E
- Country: Slovenia
- Traditional region: Upper Carniola
- Statistical region: Upper Carniola
- Municipality: Škofja Loka

Area
  - Total: 0.23 km^{2} (0.089 sq mi)
- Elevation: 355.6 m (1,167 ft)

Population (2002)
  - Total: 808

Stara Loka (pronounced [ˈstaːɾa ˈloːka]; German: Altlack) is a settlement in the Municipality of Škofja Loka in the Upper Carniola region of Slovenia.

It is one of the oldest Slovene settlements first mentioned in documents concerning the lands Emperor Otto II granted to Bishop Abraham of Freising in the Duchy of Bavaria, dating to 973 AD. It was the original settlement of Loka and by 1286 it was already mentioned as Stara Loka (Old Loka).

== Church ==
The Saint George's Parish Church is also believed to have been one of the first churches in Carniola and is also one of the oldest parishes, first mentioned in 1074, when it covered the entire area of what is now Škofja Loka. It has been rebuilt a number of times, getting its current form in 1863. Tombs from the 16th and 17th centuries can still be seen in some of the side chapels.

== Stara Loka Castle ==
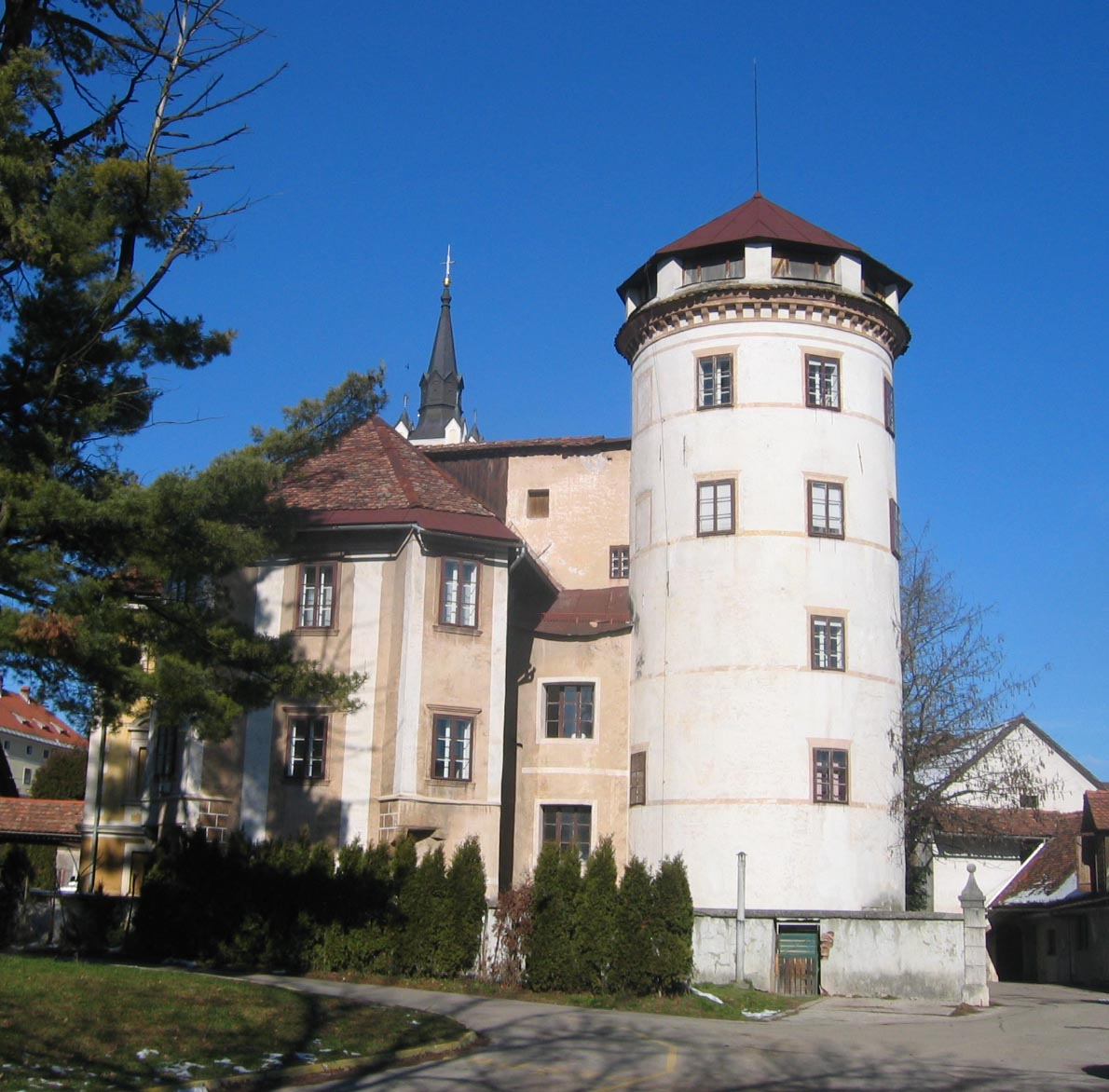
Stara Loka Castle

Opposite the church is a mansion known as Stara Loka Castle (Slovene: Starološki grad) or Strahl Castle (Slovene: Strahlov grad). It has a partly preserved defence tower from the late 15th century. The moat around the mansion is now filled in. It gets its name from the Strahl family, its 19th-century owners who partially rebuilt it and used it as a residence. It currently houses the Centre for the Blind and Partially Sighted and the Postal Museum. A unique sundial that can be read by the blind was built in front of it in 1998.
