= Alojzij Šuštar =

Slovenian archbishop

His Excellency Alojzij Šuštar
- Archbishop of Ljubljana
- Church: Roman Catholic
- Archdiocese: Ljubljana
- Appointed: 23 February 1980
- In office: 1980-1997
- Predecessor: Jožef Pogačnik
- Successor: Franc Rode

Orders
- Ordination: 27 October 1946
- Consecration: 13 April 1980 by Michele Cecchini
- Rank: Metropolitan Archbishop

Personal details
- Born: November 14, 1920 Trebnje, Slovenia
- Died: June 29, 2007 (aged 86) Ljubljana, Slovenia

Alojzij Šuštar (14 November 1920 – 29 June 2007) was the Archbishop of Ljubljana from 1980 until 1997. He remained Archbishop Emeritus of the Roman Catholic Archdiocese of Ljubljana after his retirement. He was born in Grmada near Trebnje and died in Ljubljana, where he lived at the St. Stanislaus Institute for the last 10 years of his life.

Catholic Church titles
Preceded by Jožef Pogačnik	Archbishop of Ljubljana; 1980–1997	Succeeded by Franc Rode
Preceded by New title	President of the Slovenian Bishops' Conference; 1992–1997	Succeeded by Franc Rode
