= Jožef Smej =

Slovene Roman Catholic bishop (1922–2020)

- Titular Bishop of Tzernicus
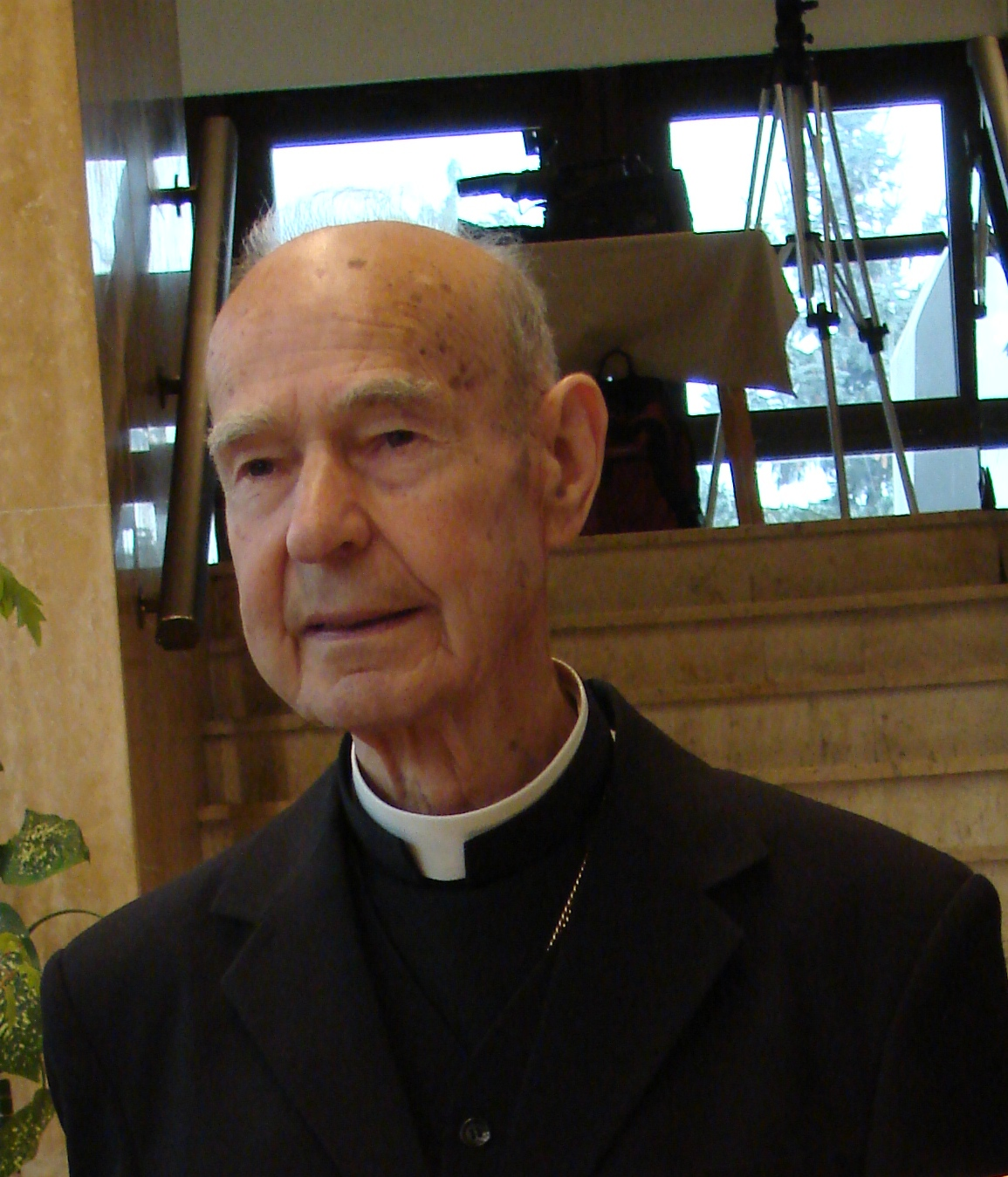
- Church: Roman Catholic Church
- See: Titular See of Tzernicus
- In office: 1983–2020
- Predecessor: Michael Rusnak
- Successor: Vacant
- Previous post: Prelate

Orders
- Ordination: 8 December 1944

Personal details
- Born: 15 February 1922 Bogojina, Kingdom of Serbs, Croats and Slovenes (present day Slovenia)
- Died: 21 November 2020 (aged 98) Lenart v Slovenskih Goricah, Slovenia

Jožef Smej (15 February 1922 – 21 November 2020) was a Slovene prelate of the Roman Catholic Church.

Smej was born in Bogojina, Slovenia and was ordained a priest on 8 December 1944. Smej was appointed auxiliary bishop of the Archdiocese of Maribor, as well as titular bishop of Tzernicus, on 15 April 1983 and ordained bishop on 23 May 1983.

Smej held the position of auxiliary bishop of the Maribor diocese until his retirement on 18 June 2009.

He died in November 2020, at the age of 98, from COVID-19 during the COVID-19 pandemic in Slovenia.

== See also ==
- Archdiocese of Maribor
