= Diocese of Novo Mesto =

Diocese in the city Novo Mesto in the ecclesiastical province of Ljubljana in Slovenia

Coordinates: 45°48′12.5″N 15°10′0.75″E

Diocese of Novo Mesto Dioecesis Novae Urbis Škofija Novo mesto

Catholic
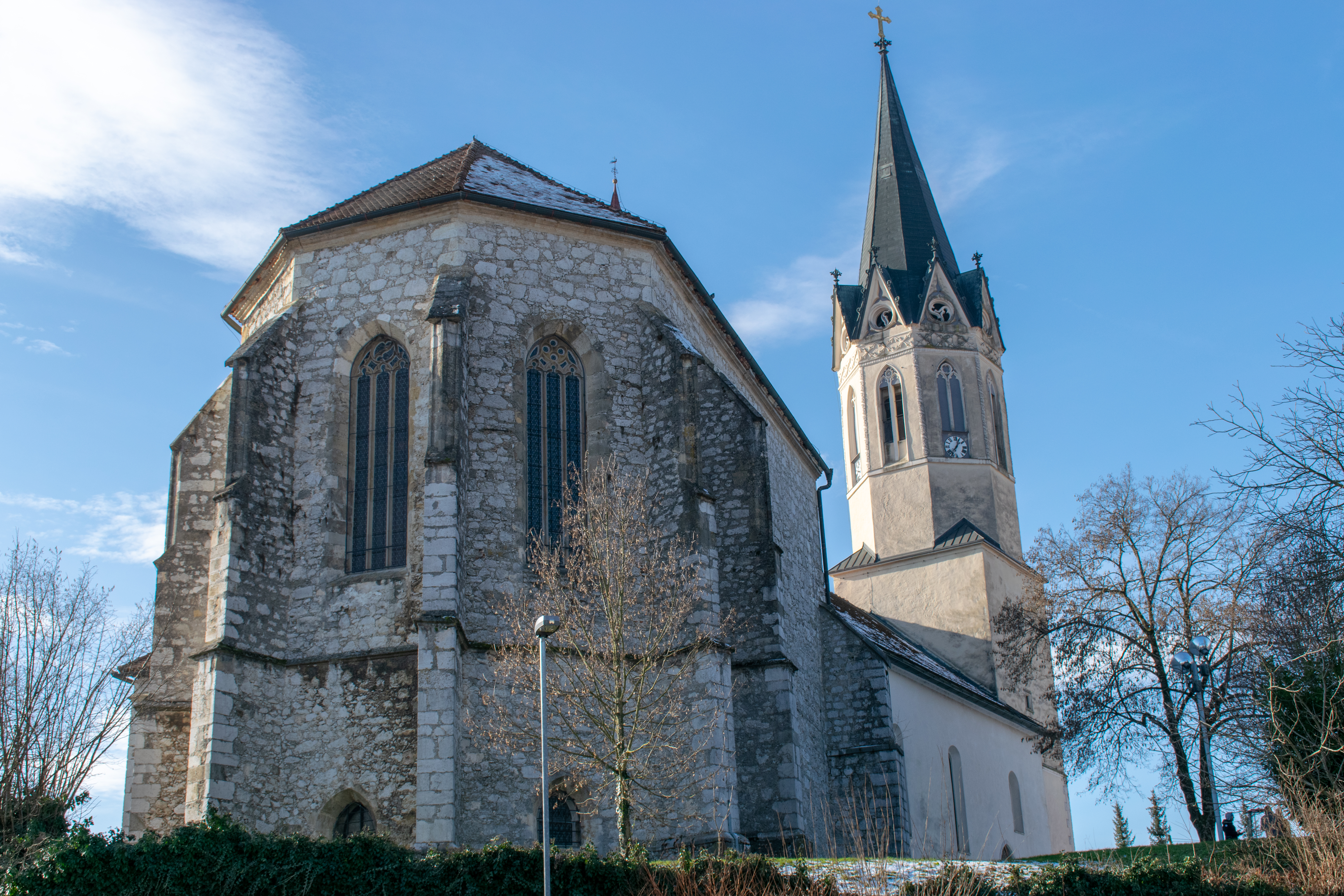
- Saint Nicholas' Cathedral, Novo Mesto

Location
- Country: Slovenia
- Ecclesiastical province: Ljubljana
- Metropolitan: Archdiocese of Ljubljana

Statistics
- Area: 2,160 km^{2} (830 sq mi)
- Population: Total; Catholics: (as of 2013); 159,595; 137,424 (86.1%)

Information
- Rite: Latin Rite
- Established: 7 April 2006
- Cathedral: Saint Nicholas' Cathedral, Novo Mesto

Current leadership
- Pope: Leo XIV
- Bishop: Andrej Saje
- Metropolitan Archbishop: Stane Zore

Website
- Website of the Diocese

The Diocese of Novo Mesto (Latin: Dioecesis Novae Urbis; Slovene: Škofija Novo mesto) is a Latin Church diocese of the Catholic Church in the city of Novo Mesto in the ecclesiastical province of Ljubljana in Slovenia.

== History ==
- April 7, 2006: Established as Diocese of Novo Mesto from the Metropolitan Archdiocese of Ljubljana

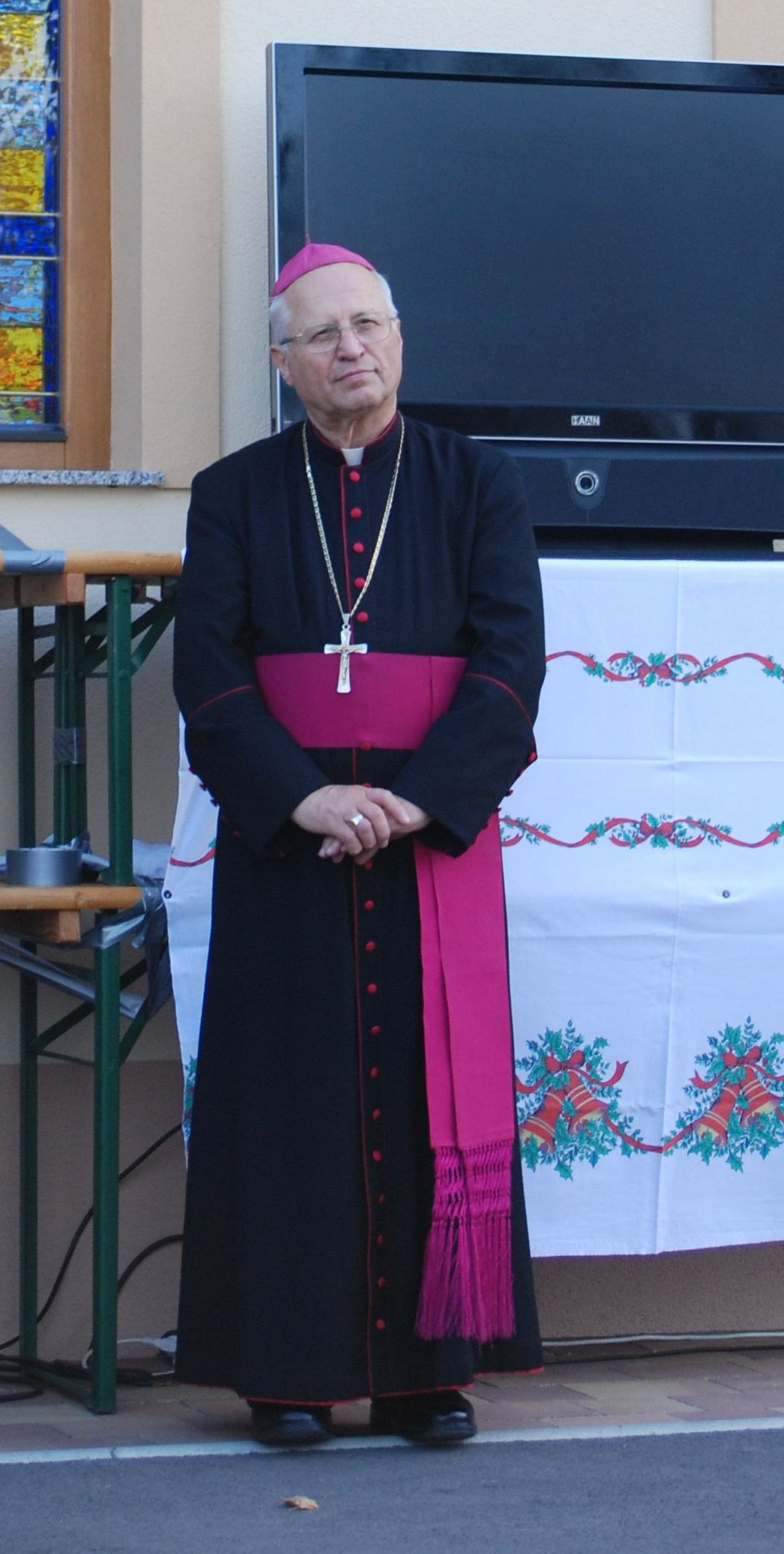
Bishop Andrej Glavan

== Leadership ==
- Bishops of Novo Mesto (Roman rite)
  - Bishop Andrej Glavan (7 April 2006 – 30 June 2021)
  - Bishop Andrej Saje (30 June 2021 – present)

== See also ==
- Roman Catholicism in Slovenia
