= Franc Rode =

Slovenian cardinal

His Eminence Franc Rode CM
- Archbishop Emeritus of Ljubljana; Prefect Emeritus of the Congregation for Institutes of Consecrated Life and Societies of Apostolic Life
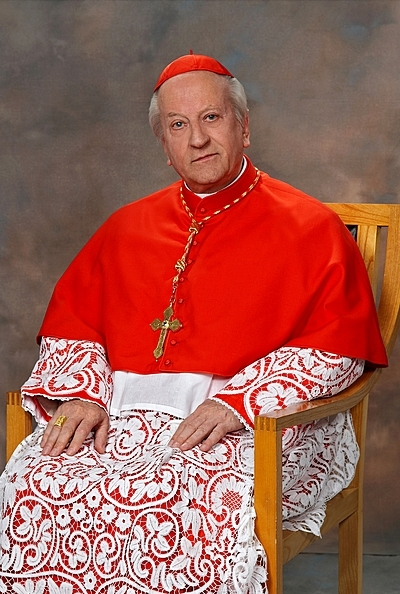
- Appointed: 11 February 2004
- Term ended: 4 January 2011
- Predecessor: Eduardo Martínez Somalo
- Successor: João Braz de Aviz
- Other post: Cardinal-Priest ("pro hac vice") of San Francesco Saverio alla Garbatella
- Previous posts: Secretary of the Secretariat of Non-Believers (1987–1993); Secretary of the Pontifical Council for Culture (1993–1997); Archbishop of Ljubljana (1997–2004)

Orders
- Ordination: 29 June 1960 by André-Jean-François Defebvre
- Consecration: 6 April 1997 by Alojzij Šuštar
- Created cardinal: 24 March 2006 by Pope Benedict XVI
- Rank: Cardinal-Priest

Personal details
- Born: Franc Rode; 23 September 1934 (age 92) Rodica, Slovenia
- Denomination: Roman Catholic
- Education: Pontifical Gregorian University, Catholic Institute of Paris
- Motto: Stati inu obstati
- Coat of arms

Franc Rode CM (or Rodé; born 23 September 1934) is a Slovenian Catholic prelate who served as prefect of the Dicastery for Institutes of Consecrated Life and Societies of Apostolic Life from 2004 to 2011. He is a member of the Congregation of the Mission and was made a cardinal in 2006.

== Biography ==
=== Early life and religious profession ===
Franc Rode was born in Rodica near Ljubljana, in Yugoslavia (modern-day Slovenia). In 1945, he and his family sought refuge in Austria and later fled to Argentina in 1948. He entered the Congregation of the Mission, more commonly known as the Vincentians or Lazarists, in Buenos Aires in 1952, making his perpetual profession in 1957. Rode studied at the Pontifical Gregorian University in Rome, and at the Catholic Institute of Paris, from where he obtained his doctorate in theology in 1968. Rode is fluent in Slovene, Spanish, Italian, French, and German.

=== Pastoral work ===
Rode was ordained to the priesthood by Bishop André-Jean-François Defebvre CM, on 29 June 1960 in Paris. In 1965, at the request of his superiors, Rode returned to Yugoslavia, where he worked as vice-pastor, director of studies and provincial visitor of the Lazarists, and professor of fundamental theology and Missiology at the Theological Faculty of Ljubljana.

=== Curial work ===
In 1978, Rode was made consultor of the Secretariat for Non-Believers in the Roman Curia, being transferred to that dicastery in 1981 and rising to become its Undersecretary in 1982. During this time, he assisted in the organization of some significant dialogue sessions with European Marxists. When Pope John Paul II united the Pontifical Council for Culture and Pontifical Council for Non-Believers in 1993, he appointed Rode Secretary of the new Pontifical Council for Culture. As Secretary, he served as the second-highest official of that dicastery, under Paul Poupard.

=== Archbishop ===
On 5 March 1997, Pope John Paul appointed Rode Archbishop of Ljubljana. He received his episcopal consecration on the following 6 April from Archbishop Alojzij Šuštar, with Archbishop Franc Perko and Cardinal Aloysius Ambrozic, Archbishop of Toronto, a fellow ethnic Slovene bishop from the diaspora serving as co-consecrators, in the Cathedral of Ljubljana. Rode successfully guided the negotiations for a new concordat to final approval in 2004.

=== Cardinal ===
Rode was created a Cardinal Deacon by Pope Benedict XVI on 24 March 2006. His motto is a phrase in Old Slovene, "Stati inu obstati" (To Exist and Persevere / To Stand and Withstand), taken from the Catechism of Primož Trubar, which is also inscribed on the Slovenian 1 euro coin. In 2013, he was the first Slovenian in history to participate in a papal conclave.

=== Congregation for Institutes of Consecrated Life ===
Rode returned to the Roman Curia upon his nomination as prefect of the Congregation for Institutes of Consecrated Life and Societies of Apostolic Life on 11 February 2004. Pope Benedict XVI later created Rode Cardinal-Deacon of S. Francesco Saverio alla Garbatella in the consistory of 24 March 2006. In January 2011, he retired as the prefect of the Congregation.

Until his 80th birthday, Rode was a member of the various offices in the Roman Curia: congregations of Divine Worship and the Discipline of the Sacraments; for Bishops; for the Evangelization of Peoples; for Catholic Education; Pontifical Council for Culture and the Pontifical Commission Ecclesia Dei.

He was one of the cardinal electors who participated in the 2013 papal conclave that elected Pope Francis.

=== Allegations of fatherhood ===
In August 2012, the Slovenian newspaper Delo reported allegations that Rode had fathered a child. Rode denied the allegations and expressed willingness to submit to a DNA test. He also announced lawsuits against the media for alleged breaches of his right to privacy. "After all they've done to me they deserve this," he said. In October 2012, the alleged child, Peter Stelzer, and the alleged father, Franc Rode, performed a DNA test of fatherhood at the Institute for Legal Medicine of LMU Munich. The test was reported negative by the institute and both Rode and Stelzer irrevocably agreed with the reported result.

Catholic Church titles
Preceded by Bernard Henri René Jacqueline	Undersecretary of the Secretariat for Non-Believers; 1982 – 1987	Succeeded by José Montero
Preceded by Jordán Gallego Salvadores	Secretary of the Pontifical Council for Dialogue with Non-Believers; 1987 – 25 March 1993	Office abolished
Preceded by Hervé Carrier	Secretary of the Pontifical Council for Culture; 25 March 1993 – 5 March 1997	Succeeded by Bernard Ardura
Preceded by Alojzij Šuštar	Archbishop of Ljubljana; 5 March 1997 – 11 February 2004	Succeeded by Alojzij Uran
Preceded by Alojzij Šuštar	President of the Slovenian Episcopal Conference; 1997 – 2004	Succeeded by Franc Kramberger
Preceded by Eduardo Martínez Somalo	Prefect of the Congregation for Institutes of Consecrated Life and Societies of Apostolic Life; 11 February 2004 – 4 January 2011	Succeeded by João Braz de Aviz
Preceded by Leo Scheffczyk	Cardinal-Deacon of San Francesco Saverio alla Garbatella; 24 March 2006 – 20 June 2016	Himself as Cardinal-Priest
Himself as Cardinal-Deacon	Cardinal-Priest 'pro hac vice' of San Francesco Saverio alla Garbatella; 20 June 2016 –	Incumbent
