= Leslie (name) =

- Pronunciation: UK: /ˈlɛzli/ LEZ-lee; US: /ˈlɛsli/ LESS-lee
- Gender: Both

Other gender
- Feminine: Lesley

Origin
- Origin: Scottish Gaelic
- Derivation: from a placename
- Meaning: 'holly garden'

Leslie is a surname and given name, derived from the name of Clan Leslie. The name may also be spelled Lesley. The name derives from the lands of Leslie in Aberdeenshire, perhaps an anglicisation of an originally Gaelic leas celyn "holly-garden". In the United Kingdom, the name is spelled Leslie when given to boys, while for girls it is usually rendered as Lesley.

Leslie is also used as an anglicization of the male name Ladislaus, or its variant László. In this context, the name is derived from Slavic elements, with 'vladeti' meaning 'rule' and 'slava' meaning 'glory'.

Notable people and characters with the name include:

== Given name ==
=== Female ===
- Leslie (singer) (born 1985), French pop-R&B singer
- Leslie Ash (born 1960), British actress
- Leslie Cohen Berlowitz (1944–2020), American academic
- Leslie Bibb (born 1974), American actress
- Leslie Greene Bowman (born 1956), American museum administrator
- Leslie Caron (born 1931), French actress
- Leslie Carrara-Rudolph, American puppeteer, also known as Abby Cadabby, on Sesame Street
- Leslie Carter (1986–2012), American singer, sister of Nick and Aaron Carter
- Mrs. Leslie Carter (1857–1937), American stage actress
- Leslie Cheng, American mathematician
- Leslie Erganian, American artist
- Leslie Feist (born 1976), Canadian singer
- Leslie Fish (1953–2025), American musician and songwriter, anarchist and political activist
- Lesley Gore (1946–2015), American singer, songwriter, actress, and activist
- Leslie Graves (1959–1995), American actress
- Leslie Herson (1942–2008), American businesswoman and artist
- Leslie Hogben, American mathematician
- Annette "Leslie" Jones (born 1967), American comedian and actress
- Leslie Ann Jones, American recording engineer
- Leslie Kritzer (born 1977), American musical theatre actress and singer
- Leslie Liao, American comedian
- Leslie Lyness (born 1968), American field hockey player
- Leslie Mahaffy (1976–1991), Canadian homicide victim
- Leslie Mann (born 1972), American actress
- Lesley Manville (born 1956), English actress
- Leslie Marshall (journalist), American journalist
- Leslie Marshall (writer), American novelist, magazine editor and journalist
- Leslie "Sam" Phillips (born 1962), American singer and songwriter
- Leslie Pope (1954–2020), American set decorator
- Leslie Purvis (1927–2015), New Zealand netball player
- Lesley Stahl (born 1941), American television journalist
- Lesley Sharp (born 1960), English stage, film, and television actress
- Leslie Silva (born 1968), American actress
- Leslie Crocker Snyder (born 1942), American lawyer and former judge
- Leslie Tripathy (born 1990), Indian film actress
- Leslie Uggams (born 1943), American actress
- Leslie Van Houten (born 1949), American murderer and member of the Manson Family
- Lesley Ann Warren (born 1946), American actress

=== Male ===
- Les Aspin (1938–1995), American politician
- Leslie Patrick Bailey (1953–1993), British serial killer and member of the 'Dirty Dozen'
- Leslie Banks (1890–1952), English actor
- Leslie Benzies (born 1971), Scottish video game producer and former president of Rockstar North
- Leslie Bohem (born 1951), screenwriter who wrote Dante's Peak and Taken, among others
- Leslie Boslaugh (1917–2006), American lawyer who served as a justice of the Nebraska Supreme Court
- Leslie Cauchi, backup singer with The Del-Satins and Johnny Maestro & the Brooklyn Bridge
- Leslie Charteris (1907–1993), half-Chinese, half-English author of primarily mystery fiction
- Leslie Cheung (1956–2003), Hong Kong actor-singer
- Leslie Claudius (1927–2012), Indian Olympic hockey player
- Leslie Edward "Les" Claypool (born 1963), lead vocalist and bassist in the band Primus
- Leslie Cochran (1951–2012), vagrant cross-dresser of Austin, Texas
- Leslie Crowther (1933–1996), English comedian and TV presenter
- Leslie Dilley (1941–2025), Welsh production designer and art director
- Leslie Duncan (1880–1952), Australian journalist and politician
- Leslie J. Edhlund (1911–1994), American mechanical engineer and politician
- Les Ferdinand (born 1966), English footballer
- Leslie Fossel, American politician
- Leslie Frazier (born 1959), American NFL head coach and former player
- Les Gleadell (1921–2009), Falkland Islands civil servant
- Leslie Goonewardene (1909–1983), Sri Lankan statesman
- Leslie Grade (1916–1979), born Laszlo Winogradsky, British theatrical talent agent
- Leslie Grantham (1947–2018), English actor
- Leslie Groves (1896–1970), American general in command of the Manhattan Project
- Leslie Groves (cricketer) (1911–1990), New Zealand cricketer
- Leslie Hardman (1919–2008), Orthodox rabbi, British Army chaplain at Bergen-Belsen
- Leslie Bob Hope (1903–2003), born Leslie Townes Hope, British-born American actor-comedian
- Leslie Hamilton, British pilot
- Leslie Howard (actor) (1893–1943), British actor
- Leslie Howard (musician) (born 1948), Australian pianist and composer
- Leslie Mervyn Jayaratne, Sri Lankan Sinhala judge, author, 2nd Governor of Southern Province, Sri Lanka
- Leslie Peter Johnson (1930–2016), English philologist
- Leslie Jones (disambiguation), several people
- Leslie Jordan (1955–2022), American actor
- Leslie Lam, Chinese-Canadian former Paralympian
- Leslie Lamport (born 1941), American computer scientist
- Les Locke (1934 – c. 1996), Scottish footballer with Queens Park Rangers
- Leslie Khoo Kwee Hock, Singaporean convicted murderer and life convict
- Leslie Lynch King, Jr. (1913–2006), birth name of 38th U.S. President Gerald Ford
- Leslie Large (1864–1896), English vegetarianism activist
- Leslie Mándoki (born 1953), German-Hungarian singer
- Leslie Manigat (1930–2014), President of Haiti
- Les Miles (born 1953), American college football coach and former player
- Leslie Miller (disambiguation), several people
- Les Mills (born 1934), New Zealand track and field athlete and politician
- Leslie Moonves (born 1949), President and CEO of CBS
- Leslie Nielsen (1926–2010), Canadian-American actor and comedian
- Leslie Odom Jr. (born 1981), American actor and singer
- Leslie O'Neal (born 1964), American football player
- Leslie Parnas (1931–2022), American musician
- Leslie Phillips (1924–2022), English actor
- Leslie Pridgen (born 1978), American rapper who goes by the name of Freeway
- Leslie E. Robertson (1928–2021), American engineer
- Leslie Sarony (1897–1985), British entertainer, singer, actor and songwriter
- Leslie Rogne Schumacher (born 1982), American academic and author
- Leslie Sears (1901–1992), English cricketer
- Leslie Stephen (1832–1904), English author and critic
- Leslie Thomas (1931–2014), British author
- Leslie Francis Stokes Upton (1931–1980), English and Canadian historian, author
- Leslie Valiant (born 1949), British computer scientist
- Leslie L. Westin (1917–1985), American businessman, educator, and politician
- Leslie West (1945–2020), American musician
- Les Wexner (born 1937), American businessman, founder of L Brands
- Leslie D. Zettergren (born 1943), American biomedical researcher

== Surname ==
- Alan M. Leslie, Scottish psychologist
- Alexander Leslie, Earl of Ross (died 1402)
- Alexander Leslie, 1st Earl of Leven (c. 1580 – 1661)
- Alexander Leslie of Auchintoul (died 1663)
- Andrew Leslie (Canadian Army officer) (born 1957), Canadian Forces general and politician
- Andrew Leslie (shipbuilder) (1818–?), Scottish shipbuilder
- Andrew Leslie, 5th Earl of Rothes (died 1611), Scottish nobleman
- Ann Leslie (1941–2023), British journalist
- Austin Leslie (1934–2005), New Orleans chef
- Bethel Leslie (1929–1999), American actress and screenwriter
- Cameron Leslie (born 1990), New Zealand paralympics gold medal winner
- Charles Leslie (nonjuror) (1650–1722), British Jacobite nonjuror and controversialist
- Charles Leslie (priest) (1718–1781), Irish Anglican priest
- Charles Robert Leslie (1794–1859), American genre painter
- Chris Leslie (born 1972), British Labour Co-operative Member of Parliament for Shipley and for Nottingham East
- Chris Leslie (musician) (born 1956), English electric folk musician
- Conor Leslie (born 1991), American actress
- Cory Leslie (born 1989), American steeplechase runner
- David Leslie, 1st Lord Newark (c. 1600–1682), Scottish Civil War general
- David Leslie (Oregon politician) (c. 1797–1869), American missionary and pioneer in Oregon
- David Leslie (racing driver) (1953–2008), Scottish Touring Car racing driver
- Delroy Leslie (born 1970), Jamaican boxer
- Desmond Leslie (1921–2001), Irish writer and film-maker
- Donald Leslie, (1911–2004), American musician, created and manufactured the Leslie speaker
- Edgar Leslie (1885–1976), American songwriter, lyricist, charter member of ASCAP
- Edward Leslie (born 1957), American professional wrestler
- Finn Leslie (born 2008), British racing driver
- Frank Leslie (1821–80), English-American publisher of Frank Leslie's Weekly
- Frank Leslie (Medal of Honor), American Civil War Medal of Honor recipient
- Franklyn Leslie (c. 1848 – c. 1930), Western gunfighter
- Frederick W. Leslie (born 1951), NASA payload specialist
- George Dunlop Leslie (1835–1921), English artist
- George Leonidas Leslie (1842–1878), American bank robber and architect
- Henrietta Leslie (1884–1946), British suffragette, writer and pacifist
- Henry David Leslie (1822–1896), English composer and conductor
- Javicia Leslie, (born 1987), American actress
- Jim Leslie (journalist) (1937–1976), American public relations executive
- Jim Leslie (businessman) (1922–2012), Australian businessman
- Joan Leslie (1925–2015), American actress
- John Leslie (disambiguation), several people
- Jordan Leslie (born 1991), American football player
- Lawrie Leslie (1935–2019), Scottish footballer
- Lew Leslie (1886–1963), Broadway producer
- Lisa Leslie (born 1972), American basketball player
- Martin Leslie (Australian footballer) (born 1962), Australian rules footballer
- Martin Leslie (rugby union) (born 1971), New Zealand rugby union player
- May Sybil Leslie (1887–1937), British chemist
- Megan Leslie, a Member of Parliament in the riding of Halifax, Nova Scotia
- Melanie Leslie, dean of the Benjamin N. Cardozo School of Law
- Michael Leslie (snooker player) (born 1993), Scottish snooker player
- Michael Leslie (dancer), Indigenous Australian dancer and choreographer
- Miriam Leslie (1828–1914), American publisher, author, and suffragist, wife of Frank Leslie
- Patrick Leslie (1815–1881), early settler in Australia
- Preston Leslie (1819–1907), governor of Kentucky (1871–75)
- R. Conrad Leslie, American businessman
- Rose Leslie (born 1987), Scottish actress
- Ryan Leslie (born 1978), American record producer and singer
- Shane Leslie, Sir John Randolph Leslie, 3rd Baronet (1885–1971)
- Sheila Leslie (born 1955), American politician
- Stefan Leslie (born 1987), Canadian soccer player
- Steve Leslie (footballer, born 1976), Scottish footballer
- Steve Leslie (footballer, born 1987), Scottish footballer
- Thomas Edward Cliffe Leslie (1825–1882), Irish economist
- Walter Leslie, Lord of Ross (died 1382)
- Walter Leslie (field marshal) (1607–1667), Imperial field marshal
- William Leslie (disambiguation) or Bill Leslie, several people

== Fictional characters ==
- Leslie Burke, the female protagonist of the Katherine Paterson novel Bridge to Terabithia
- Leslie Crambottom, a character In the American sitcom Silver Spoons
- Leslie Harcourt, the hero of Verna M. Raynor's 1899 play Noel Corson's Oath; or Leonia's Repentance
- Leslie Lynnton, the socialite played by Elizabeth Taylor in the 1956 film Giant
- Lieutenant Leslie, a character from Star Trek, played by Eddie Paskey (spelled Lesley in the show's credits, but has come to be written more often as Leslie by the fandom)
- Leslie "Jake" Ryan (Hannah Montana), a recurring character on the Disney Channel program Hannah Montana, played by Cody Linley
- Leslie Chow, Chinese character in The Hangover
- Leslie Knope, the main character on the NBC sitcom Parks and Recreation, played by Amy Poehler
- Leslie Winkle, a recurring character on the CBS sitcom The Big Bang Theory, played by Sara Gilbert
- Leslie, a flower from The Amazing World of Gumball, a Cartoon Network British animated series
- Leslie Meyers, a character in South Park
- Nurse Leslie, a character in Camp Lazlo
- Leslie Withers, a character from the survival horror video game The Evil Within
- Leslie P. Lilylegs, an antagonist in the Looney Tunes
- Leslie Kyle, a character in the video game, Final Fantasy VII Remake, and the novel, Final Fantasy VII The Kids Are Alright: A Turks Side Story, voiced by Mark Whitten
- Lesley is a playable character in the mobile game Mobile Legends: Bang Bang
- Captain Leslie Hero, a main character from the adult animated television sitcom Drawn Together and a lecherous parody of Superman and other superheroes
- Leslie Vernon, the main character of the 2006 horror-comedy "Behind the Mask: The Rise of Leslie Vernon", played by Nathan Baesel
- The Great Leslie, a character played by Tony Curtis in the 1965 film The Great Race
- Leslie, a lesbian from adult animated series Brickleberry
- Leslie, a student in the Wayside animated TV series
- Lezly "Big Lez" Mackerel, main character of Australian comedy web series, The Big Lez Show
- Sir Les Patterson, a character created and portrayed by Australian comedian Barry Humphries
- Leslie Willis, or Livewire, a supervillain in DC Comics

== See also ==
- Leslie (disambiguation)
