= Frank Leslie (disambiguation) =

Frank Leslie (1821–1880) was an English-born American engraver, illustrator, and publisher.

Frank Leslie may also refer to:

- Frank Matthews Leslie (1935–2000), professor and mathematical physicist
- Buckskin Frank Leslie (1842–1930), U.S. Army scout, gambler, miner, and gunfighter
- Frank Leslie (Medal of Honor) (1841–1882), Medal of Honor recipient
- Miriam Leslie (1836–1914), wife of Frank Leslie who legally changed her name to Frank after his death
