= Leopold Petazzi de Castel Nuovo =

Austrian bishop (1703–1772)

- Bishop of Laibach
- Church: Catholic Church
- Diocese: Diocese of Laibach
- In office: 15 December 1760 – 1772
- Predecessor: Ernst Gottlieb von Attems
- Successor: Johann Karl von Herberstein
- Previous post: Bishop of Trieste (1740-1760)

Orders
- Ordination: 7 July 1726
- Consecration: 8 January 1741 by Sigismund Felix von Schrattenbach

Personal details
- Born: 18 July 1703 Vienna, Archduchy of Austria, Holy Roman Empire
- Died: 1772 (aged 68–69) Laibach, Duchy of Carniola, Austrian Circle, Holy Roman Empire

Leopold Petazzi de Castel Nuovo (born 1703 in Vienna) was an Austrian clergyman and bishop for the Roman Catholic Archdiocese of Ljubljana. He was ordained in 1726. He was appointed bishop in 1740. He died in 1772.
