= Konrad Adam Glušič =

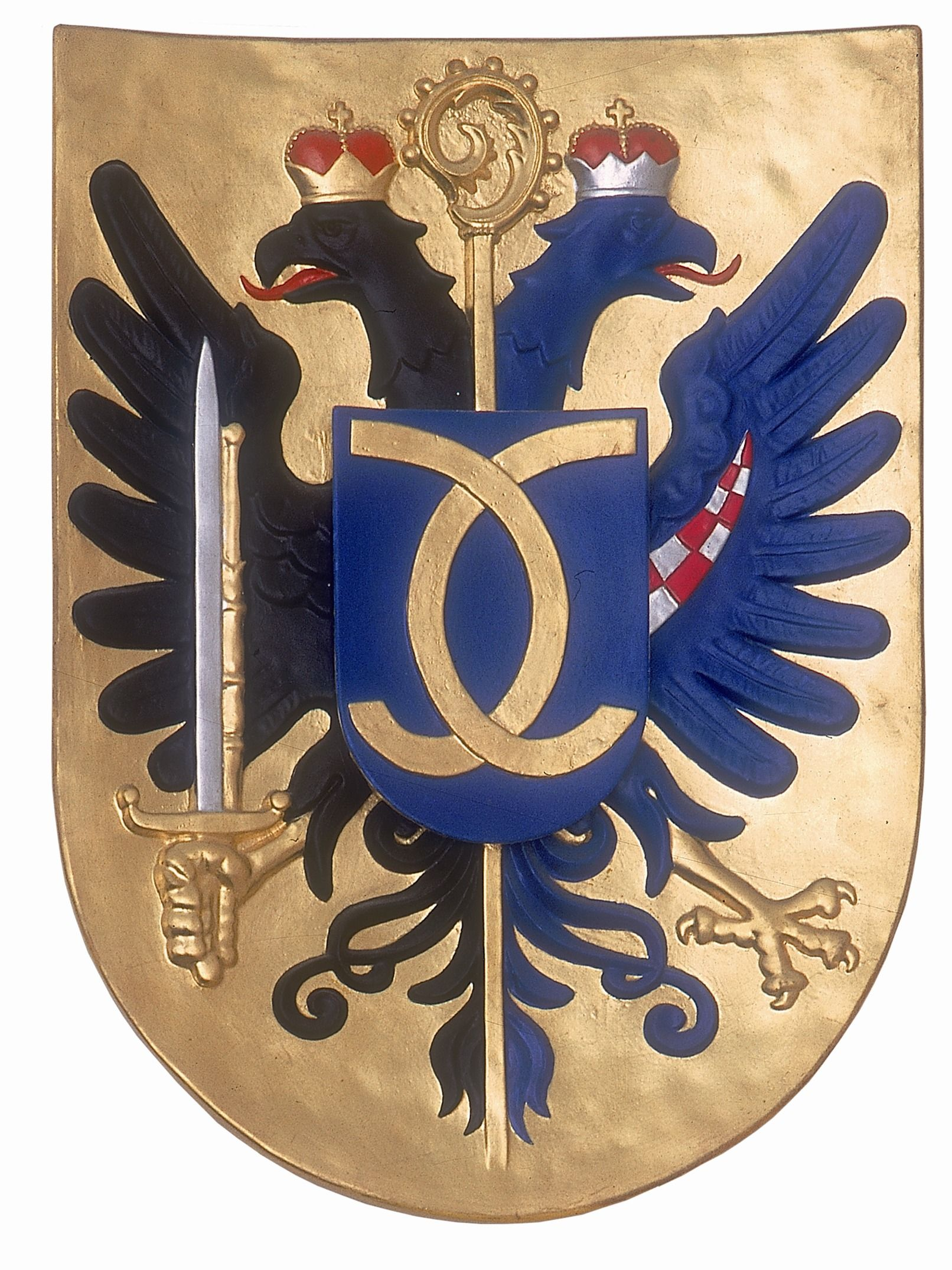
Coat of arms of Konrad Glušič.

Konrad Adam Glušič (originally Glus(ch)itsch, first name also spelled Conrad, 1527–1578), was a clergyman and bishop of the Roman Catholic Archdiocese of Ljubljana. He was born in Komen or near Gornji Grad. He was appointed bishop in 1571. He died in 1578.

== Name ==
In addition to Glušič, his surname is attested as Gluschitsch, Glusitsch, Glussitsch, and Gluscitz. The spellings Gluschitsch and Glusitsch are attested in 1689, Glussitsch in 1851, and Gluschitz in 1854. His surname appears Slovenized as Glušič by 1875.
