= Gadie Burn =

Stream in Aberdeenshire, Scotland

Coordinates: 57°19′18″N 2°30′04″W

Gadie Burn

The Gadie Burn is a small stream in Aberdeenshire, Scotland. It is a tributary of the River Urie and flows through the Garioch area.

The Gadie Burn originates at a chalybeate spring named "Holy Well", adjacent to the hamlet of Smallburn, near the village of Clatt.

The river is associated with the song "O Gin I Were Where Gadie Rins".
