= Franz Karl von Kaunitz =

Roman-catholic bishop

Franz Karl Josef von Kaunitz-Rietberg
- Bishop of Laibach
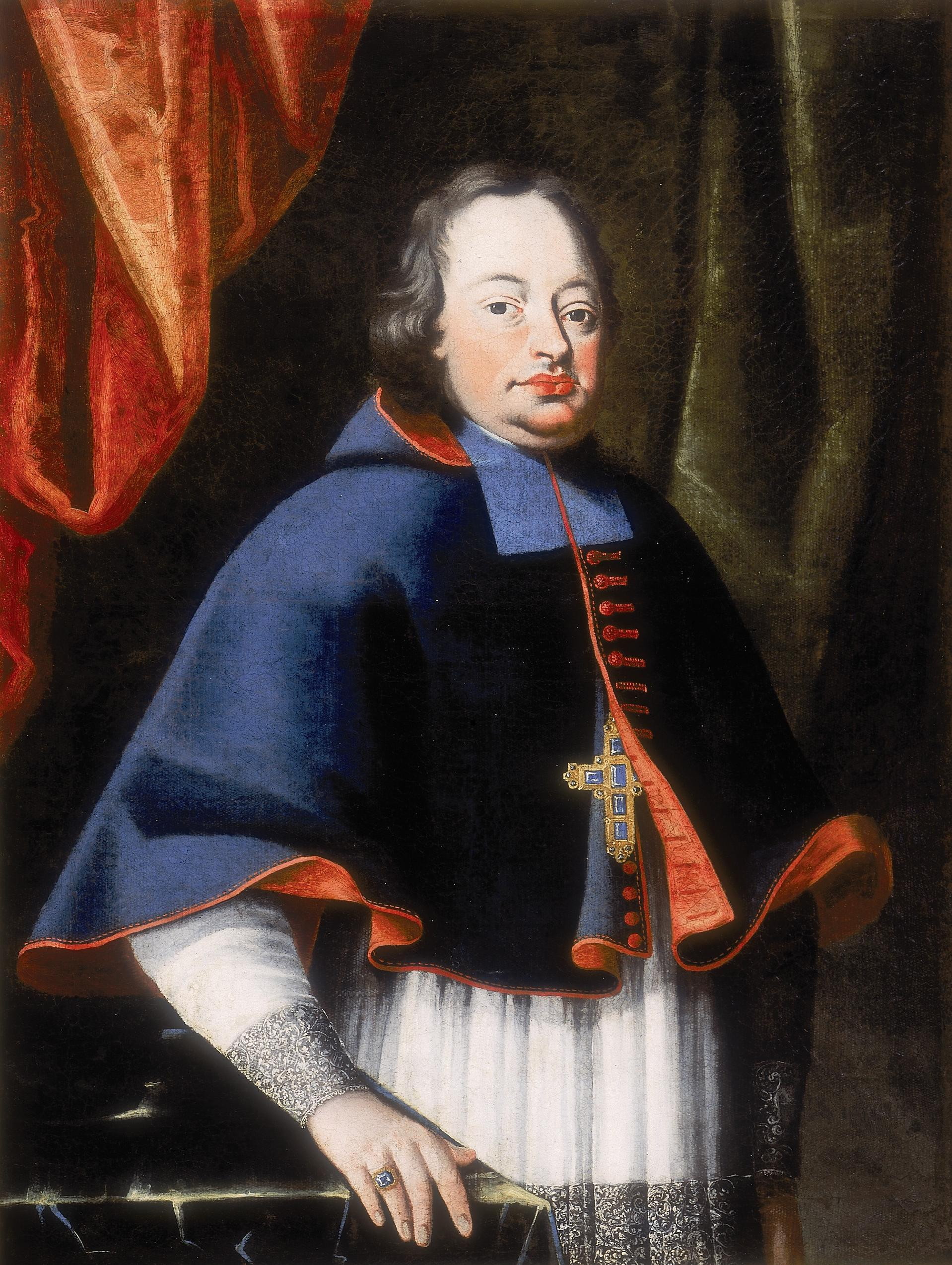
- Church: Catholic Church
- Diocese: Diocese of Laibach
- In office: 1 June 1711 – 27 December 1717
- Predecessor: Franc Ferdinand Kuenburg
- Successor: Wilhelm von Leslie

Orders
- Ordination: 16 November 1704
- Consecration: 7 June 1711 by Fabrizio Paolucci

Personal details
- Born: 9 December 1676 Vienna, Archduchy of Austria, Austrian Circle, Holy Roman Empire
- Died: 27 December 1717 (aged 41)

Franz Karl von Kaunitz (born 1676 in Vienna) was an Austrian clergyman and bishop for the Roman Catholic Archdiocese of Ljubljana.

== Biography ==
Count Franz Karl von Kaunitz was ordained in 1704. He was appointed bishop in 1710. He died in 1717.
