= Provincial lordships =

Large feudal landholdings created in Scotland during the 12th and 13th centuries

Provincial lordships is a modern term used by historians to describe large feudal landholdings created in Scotland during the 12th and 13th centuries. These landholdings were granted by kings to their supporters to secure royal control of territories outside the core of the Kingdom of Alba, which during this period was considered to extend only between the River Forth and the River Spey to the east of the Highlands, but which controlled territory well beyond this.

As the term "provincial lordship" is a modern description rather than a formal contemporary status there are no strict criteria for assigning landholdings to the category, and lists of them differ.

== Geography and function ==
Provincial lordships covered large discrete districts and were often similar in size and function to the earldoms that developed over a similar period from the lands held by the mormaers of the original Provinces of Scotland. Some provincial lordships were older land units taken over and adapted to a feudal framework. As with earldoms, holders of provincial lordships were largely responsible for the administration of their territories and possessed most of the land within them. The territories of provincial lordships were often interspersed between earldoms as a means of securing royal power in areas where royal sheriffdoms were relatively undeveloped. All provincial lords held powers on a par with those of sheriffs, and those with regalities held powers greater than those of sheriffs, including the right to appoint their own justiciars.

== History ==
The earliest provincial lordships were those created by David I: the lordships of Annandale, Cunningham, Eskdale, Kyle Stewart, Lauderdale, Liddesdale and Strathgryfe were all established during the early 12th century, and large pre-feudal territories including Argyll, Galloway and Nithsdale also established as provincial lordships over the same period. Similar lordships were created to the north of Alba in the late 12th and early 13th centuries including Badenoch, Garioch, Strathbogie and Sutherland. Many of these were held by Anglo-Norman incomers allied with the Kings of Alba, but three lordships in the west – Garmoran, Islay and Lorne – were held by descendants of Somerled, the Norse-Gaelic former Lord of the Isles.

By ca. 1400 some of the earldoms and provincial lordships were much smaller than their original extent, but they still collectively covered two thirds of the land area of modern Scotland, and 425 of the kingdom's 925 parishes. The areas remaining within individual provincial lordships ranged from the 55 parishes of Galloway to the 2 parishes each of Liddesdale and Eskdale; in comparison the remaining areas of earldoms ranged from the 46 parishes of Moray to the 3 parishes of Buchan.

The early 15th century reigns of James I and James II saw most of the earldoms and provincial lordships forfeited to the crown or taken into crown ownership through escheat, only being regranted in shrunken form, with the result that by the late 15th century the major provincial lordships had largely disappeared. By 1450 the structure of Scottish nobility had changed: the peerage had become personal, honorific and hierarchical and had lost its association with specific territories. By this time the landholdings of earls and major lords were often fragmented and geographically dispersed, without the unity and identification with specific territories that had characterised the earlier earldoms and provincial lordships. Despite this, technically the private authority of provincial lords survived until the Heritable Jurisdictions (Scotland) Act 1746.

== Bibliography ==
- Grant, Alexander (1978). "The Development of the Scottish Peerage". The Scottish Historical Review. 57 (163 Part 1): 1–27.
- Grant, Alexander (2008). "Franchises north of the Border: Baronies and regalities in medieval Scotland". In Prestwich, Michael (ed.). Liberties and Identities in Medieval Britain and Ireland. Woodbridge: Boydell Press. pp. 155–199. ISBN 1843833743.
- Stringer, Keith J. (1996). "Earldoms and 'provincial lordships' 1124 to 1286". In McNeill, Peter G. B.; MacQueen, Hector I. (eds.). Atlas of Scottish History to 1707. Edinburgh: The Scottish Medievalists and University of Edinburgh. pp. 183–186. ISBN 0950390410.
- Taylor, Alice (2016). The Shape of the State in Medieval Scotland, 1124–1290. Oxford: Oxford University Press. ISBN 9780198749202.
