= Anton Jamnik =

Slovenian Roman Catholic prelate

Mons. Anton Jamnik
- Auxiliary Bishop of Archdiocese of Ljubljana
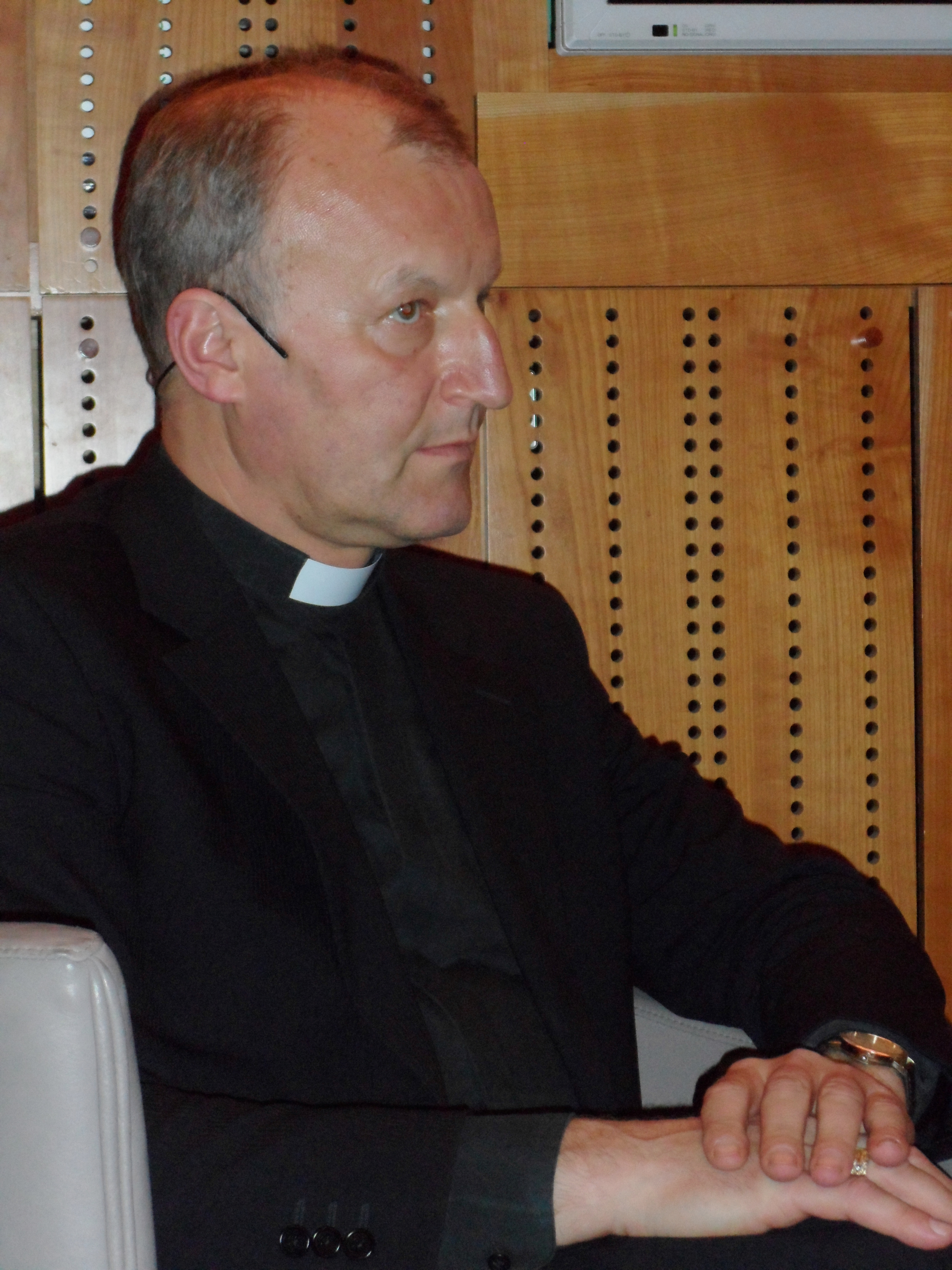
- Church: Roman Catholic Church
- Appointed: 15 November 2005
- Other post: Titular Bishop of Vina

Orders
- Ordination: 29 June 1987 (Priest) by Alojzij Šuštar
- Consecration: 8 January 2006 (Bishop) by Alojz Uran

Personal details
- Born: Anton Jamnik; 27 July 1961 (age 65) Ljubljana, FPR Yugoslavia (present day Slovenia)
- Education: University of Ljubljana

Bishop Anton Jamnik (born 27 July 1961) is a Slovenian Roman Catholic prelate who serves as a Titular Bishop of Vina and Auxiliary Bishop of Archdiocese of Ljubljana since 15 November 2005.

== Education ==
Coat of arms of Bishop Anton Jamnik

Bishop Jamnik was born into a Roman Catholic family in the capital of Slovenia, but spent his childhood in a peasant family in the village of Videm, Dobrepolje of the historical region of Lower Carniola.

After finishing primary school in Grosuplje in 1976, Anton graduated a Josip Jurčič Gymnasium in Stična with the secondary education during 1976–1980 and also served his compulsory military service in the Yugoslav Army (1980–1981). After that, he joined to the Major Theological Seminary in Ljubljana and in the same time joined the Theological Faculty at the University of Ljubljana, where he studied six years (1981–1987) and was ordained as a priest on 29 June 1985 by archbishop Alojzij Šuštar for his native Archdiocese of Ljubljana.

== Pastoral and educational work ==
After his ordination Fr. Jamnik was engaged in pastoral work and served as priest in Kočevje parish from 1987 until 1990, and from 1990 to 1994 he was a personal assistant of the Archbishop of Ljubljana.

During this time he continued his master's studies at the Department of Philosophy of the Faculty of Theology, University of Ljubljana, and in 1993 he defended his master's thesis. In 1994 he was appointed an assistant at the Department of Philosophy of the Faculty of Theology. In the same year he moved to the Institute of St. Stanislav, where he taught religion and later philosophy at the Diocesan Classical Gymnasium. He continued his doctoral studies and completed his studies with a Doctor of Philosophy degree in 1997. Since 1997 he has been an assistant professor of philosophy at the Faculty of Theology, University of Ljubljana, and in 2012 he was elected and appointed associate professor of philosophy at the Faculty of Theology, University of Ljubljana.

== Prelate ==
On 15 November 2005 he was appointed by Pope Benedict XVI as the Titular Bishop of Vina and Auxiliary Bishop of the Archdiocese of Ljubljana. On 8 January 2006 Fr. Jamnik was consecrated as bishop by Archbishop of Ljubljana Alojz Uran and other prelates of the Roman Catholic Church in the Cathedral of St. Nicholas in Ljubljana.

Catholic Church titles
Preceded by Hans-Josef Becker	Titular Bishop of Vina; 2005–present	Succeeded by Incumbent
