= Rinaldo Scarlichi =

Rinaldo Scarlichi (born 1621 in Trieste) was an Italian clergyman and bishop for the Roman Catholic Archdiocese of Ljubljana. He was ordained in 1622. He was appointed bishop in 1621. He died in 1641.
