= Wilhelm von Leslie =

Scottish Roman Catholic priest

- Bishop of Laibach
- Church: Roman Catholic Church
- In office: 1718–1727
- Predecessor: Franz Karl von Kaunitz
- Successor: Sigmund Felix von Schrattenbach
- Previous posts: Bishop of Vác (1716–1718); Coadjutor Bishop of Trieste and Titular Bishop of Abdera (1711–1716)

Orders
- Ordination: 23 March 1681 (deacon); 5 April 1681 (priest)
- Consecration: 6 March 1712 (Bishop) by Giulio Piazza

Personal details
- Born: c. 1657
- Died: 4 April 1727 (aged c. 70)
- Education: Pontifical Scots College

Wilhelm von Leslie (originally William Leslie) (c. 1657 – 4 April 1727) was a Scottish Roman Catholic priest, who became Bishop of Laibach in 1718.

== Life ==
He was the second son of William Leslie, fifth laird of Warthill, Aberdeenshire, and his wife Anne, daughter of James Elphinstone of Glack, and great-niece of William Elphinstone, bishop of Aberdeen. He went at the age of 11 with his elder brother to King's College, Aberdeen.

On leaving the university Leslie was for a time parish schoolmaster of Chapel of Garioch, near his father's property. In 1684 he moved to Padua to study. There he became a Roman Catholic convert and after studying for the priesthood at the Pontifical Scots College in Rome took holy orders. Cardinal Gregorio Barbarigo appointed him professor of theology at Padua. On 22 Dec 1697, he was consecrated bishop by Giulio Piazza, Bishop of Faenza, with László Ádám Erdődy, Bishop of Nitra, and Sigismund Kollonitsch, Bishop of Vác, serving as co-consecrators. He held a succession of church posts in Austria and Hungary, and also became a diplomat.

Leslie had relatives in Austria, the Counts Leslie, and, through their influence, he became in 1716 Bishop of Waitzen in Hungary. In favour with Emperor Joseph I, and a privy councillor, he was in 1718 translated to the see of Laibach, an appointment which carried with it the dignities of metropolitan of Carniola and prince of the Holy Roman Empire.

In 1725, Bishop Leslie sent his portrait and his diploma from the university of Padua, along with some correspondence, home to his brother in Scotland. He died two years later, in 1727.
