= Leslie Miller =

Leslie or Lesley Miller may refer to:

- Leslie A. Miller (1886–1970), governor of Wyoming, U.S.
- Leslie Anne Miller, Pennsylvania attorney
- Leslie Miller (cricketer) (1880–1963), Australian cricketer
- Leslie Miller (athlete) (born 1948), Bahamian Olympic sprinter, businessman, and politician
- Leslie Adrienne Miller (born 1956), American poet
- Leslie W. Miller, American cardiologist
- Les Miller (American football) (Leslie Miller, born 1965), American football player
- Les Miller (footballer) (Leslie Miller, 1911–1959), footballer
- Les Miller (Florida politician) (born 1951), American politician
- Sir Leslie Creery Miller (1862-1925), British Indian civil servant and judge
