= William Leslie =

William Leslie or Bill Leslie may refer to:

- William Leslie, 3rd Earl of Rothes (died 1513), Scottish nobleman, briefly Earl of Rothes in 1513, killed at Flodden Field
- William Leslie (theologian), principal of King's College, Aberdeen, leader of the Aberdeen Doctors
- Sir William Leslie, 3rd Baronet (died c. 1680), one of the Leslie baronets
- Wilhelm von Leslie (1718–1727), bishop of Laybach
- William Leslie (British Army officer) (1751–1777), son of Earl of Leven, killed at the Battle of Princeton
- William Leslie of Nethermuir (1802–1879), architect and Lord Provost of Aberdeen
- William Leslie (MP) (1814–1880), Scottish politician and MP for Aberdeenshire
- William Leslie (footballer) (fl. 1893–1904), Scottish-Argentine footballer of the late 19th century
- William Leslie (rugby league) (fl. 1908), rugby league player in the New South Wales Rugby League's foundation
- Bill Leslie (musician) (1925–2003), American jazz musician
- William Leslie (actor) (1925–2005), American actor
- Bill Leslie (journalist) (born 1952), American journalist and musician
- Bill Leslie (commentator) (born 1971), British football commentator

== See also ==
- William Lesley (1820–1876), New South Wales, Australia politician.
