= Franc Kacijanar =

Franc Kacijanar (born in Oberburg, Bern) was a Swiss clergyman and bishop for the Roman Catholic Archdiocese of Ljubljana. He was ordained in 1537. He was appointed bishop in 1538. He died in 1543.
