= River Urie =

River in Aberdeenshire, Scotland

Coordinates: 57°16′14″N 2°21′39″W

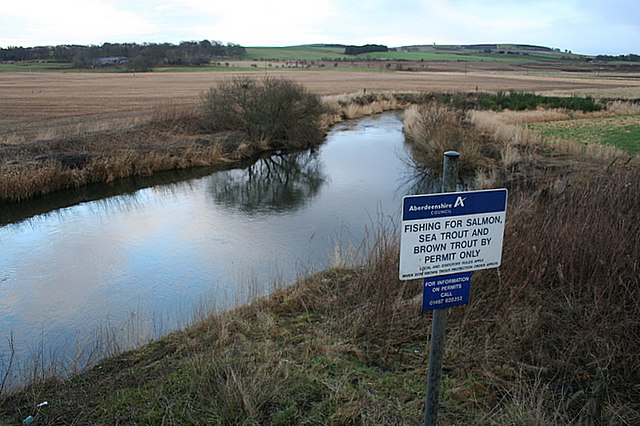
River Urie at Howford Bridge

The River Urie (or River Ury) (Scottish Gaelic: Uaraidh / Ùraidh) is a small river in northeastern Scotland situated in the Garioch area of Aberdeenshire. Its origins are close to Bennachie, approximately 25 miles to the northwest of Aberdeen. The river runs for approximately 15 miles before meeting the River Don at the south edge of Inverurie. Its main tributary is the Gadie Burn. Fishing permits are available for salmon and trout.

The Ordnance Survey use the name "River Urie" and this spelling is often used, possibly because of the association with Inverurie (which was itself spelled Inverury until the nineteenth century). Local people usually prefer the spelling "Ury" which is generally used by Aberdeenshire Council.
