= Bass of Inverurie =

Castle in Aberdeenshire, Scotland

- Inverurie, Aberdeenshire, Scotland

Site information
- Type: Motte-and-bailey castle
- Condition: Earthworks

Location
- Location in Aberdeenshire
- Coordinates: 57.2755°N 2.3650°W

Site history
- Built: 12th century

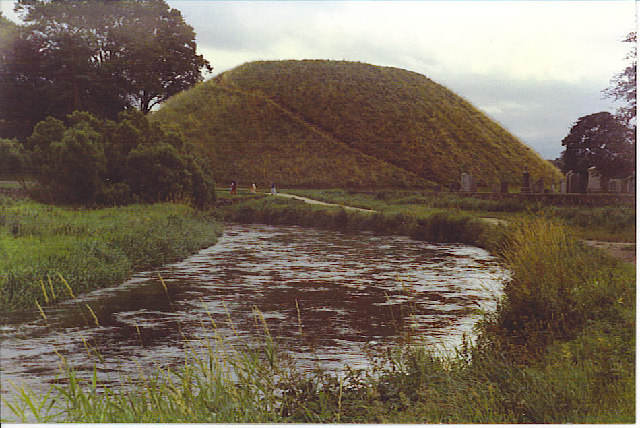
The Bass of Inverurie

The Bass of Inverurie is the remnant of a motte-and-bailey castle situated within Inverurie Cemetery in Aberdeenshire, Scotland. The motte is a natural mound, now about 12 metres (39 ft) high and 18 metres (59 ft) across the summit, which was modified by scarping its sides and digging a surrounding ditch. To the east lies the Little Bass, the former bailey, an oval mound measuring approximately 30 metres (98 ft) east–west by 23 metres (75 ft) across and standing about 5 metres (16 ft) high.

The Bass and the adjacent Little Bass to the east are the remains of the castle of Inverurie, which served as the administrative centre of the Garioch in the 12th and 13th centuries. The hereditary constables of the castle during this period were members of the De Lesselyn (Leslie) family. The site is a scheduled monument (SM99). Excavations in the 19th century revealed the remains of an oaken gangway on the motte, and medieval pottery, including fragments of a 14th-century face-mask jug, has been found in the surrounding ditch.
