= Garioch =

British committee area

Coordinates: 57.284°N 2.377°W

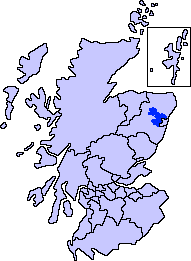
Map of Scotland showing the present-day committee area of Garioch

Garioch (Scots: The Geerie, /ˈɡɪəri/ GEER-ee, Scottish Gaelic: Gairbheach) is one of six committee areas in Aberdeenshire, Scotland. It has a population of 46,254 (2006 estimate), which gives it the largest population of Aberdeenshire's six committee areas. The Garioch consists primarily of the district drained by the River Ury and its tributaries the Shevock and the Gadie Burn.

== Name ==
The placename "Garioch" comes from the Gaelic Gairbheach, meaning "place of roughness". The name is first mentioned as "Garviach" in a charter dated to between 1178 and 1182, referring at that time to the small area now known as the Upper Garioch. This is still the meaning used in a charter granting land to the Bishop of Aberdeen in 1190, but by 1195 the name was being used to describe the entire area of the provincial lordship, extending as far east as Inverurie.

== History ==
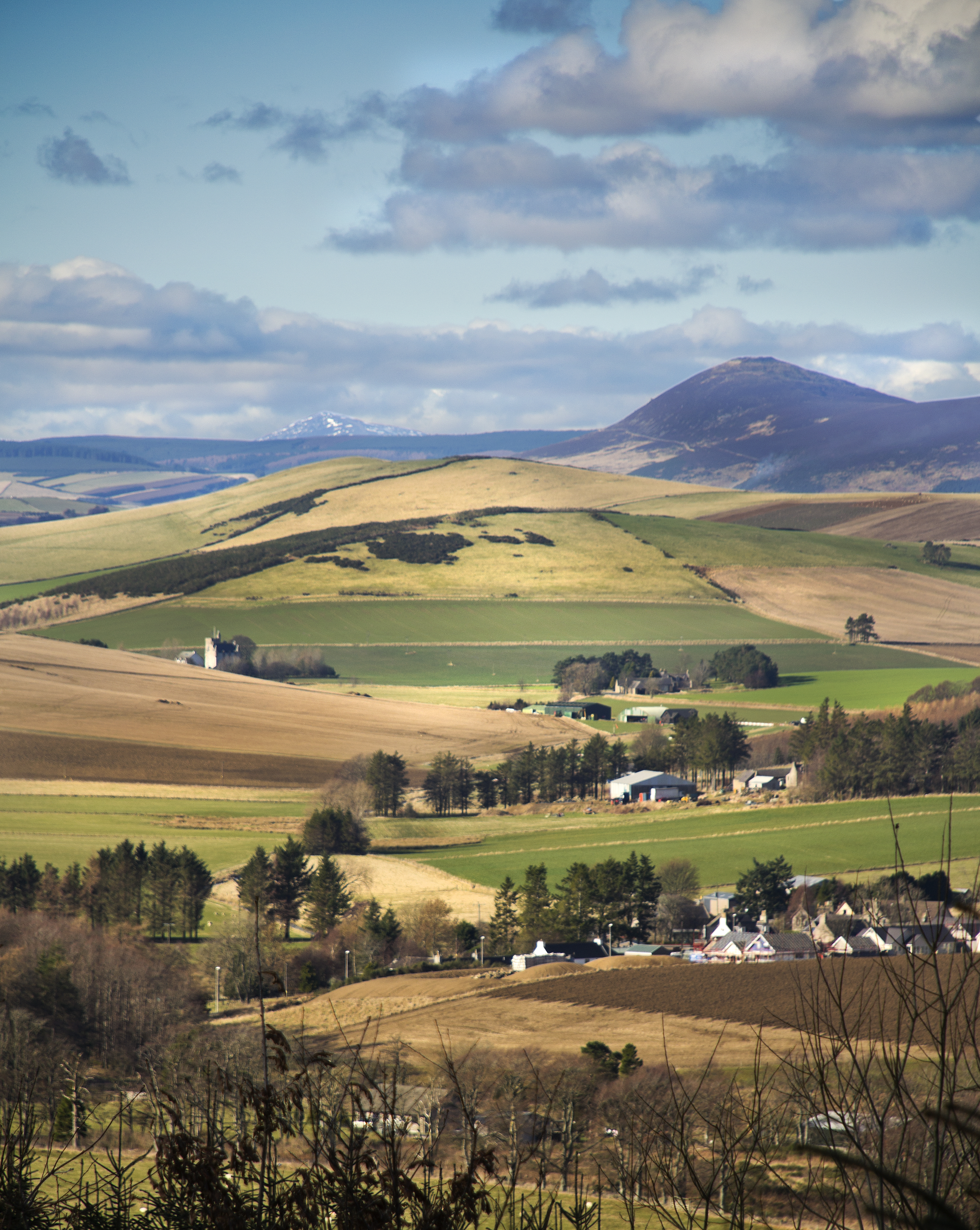
The view from Bennachie to Tap o' Noth, across the area of the original shire or thanage of Garioch.

Before the late 12th century, Garioch consisted only of the area of the parishes of Culsalmond, Insch, Rathmuriel, Kennethmont, Leslie, Premnay and Clatt in the hilly country to the west of Oyne. It was probably a shire or thanage, and may originally either have formed part of the province of Buchan, or been an area of the Pictish territory of Cé under the direct control of the kings of the dominant neighbouring kingdom of Fortriu.

The larger provincial lordship of Garioch was established and granted to David, Earl of Huntingdon by King William the Lion in a charter dated between 1178 and 1182. This was a newly created territorial unit of eleven parishes, including all of the earlier shire except Clatt, which had already been granted to the Bishop of Aberdeen, and with the new estates included in the lordship to the east – Oyne, Durno, Inverurie, Bourtie and Fintray – specified individually. The lordship was created within a broader area stretching from the Dee to the Spey that had been under royal control at least since the reign of Malcolm IV, and included the royal thanages of Formartine, Belhelvie, Kintore and Aberdeen to the south east, and the Lordship of Strathbogie to the north west. One of Earl David's first acts was to establish the precise boundaries of his acquisition through a perambulation and by 1195 "Garioch" was being used to describe the entire territory of the lordship.

The creation of the lordship was intended as an aggressive assertion of royal power: the first example north of the Mounth of the pattern already established south of the Forth by the 1160s of granting large territorial lordships to allies of the king from the incoming Anglo-Norman elite. Garioch was strategically important to securing control by the Kings of Alba over the entire north, as it lay between the earldoms of Mar and Buchan, and controlled the main routes from the Mounth north to the still-restive Province of Moray. Earl David was the King's brother and had first-hand experience of suppressing rebellions in the north, having accompanied William with a "great army" on a military expedition to Ross in 1179. Under his lordship the Garioch was intensively settled with colonisers from an English, French, Norman, Breton and Flemish background, which can still be seen in local placenames such as Ingliston near Caskieben, Williamston in Culsalmond and Flinder (originally Flandres) near Kennethmont.

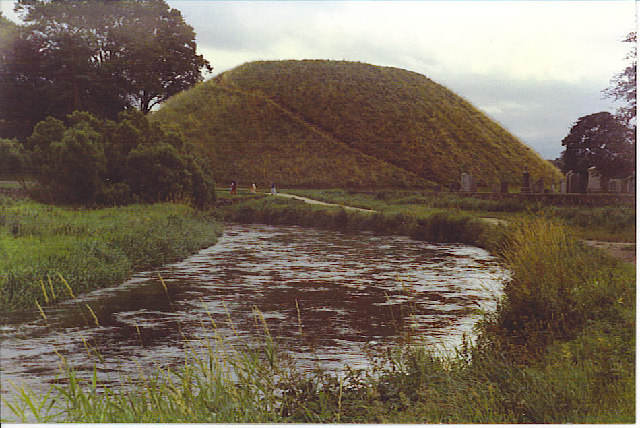
The Bass of Inverurie, the remaining motte of the main castle of the provincial lordship of Garioch

One of Earl David's first important decisions was to establish the principal power centre of the lordship at Inverurie, which was recorded as a burgh by 1195 and where Inverurie Castle was completed by 1199 at the latest. Although Inverurie was not a new settlement, it had previously been only of minor importance and before 1190 had been a dependency of the parish of Rothket.

After the death in 1237 of Earl David's childless son and successor John, the lordship was divided between his three sisters, coming into the hands of the families of their husbands John de Balliol, Robert de Brus and Henry de Hastings. As early as 1290 Robert the Bruce was seeking to take complete control of the Garioch from de Balliol's and de Hastings' descendents John Balliol and John Hastings, who were his competitors for the Crown of Scotland. In early 1315, after Bruce's victory at the Battle of Bannockburn, an inquest was held into the Balliol and Hastings lands in Garioch, and the lordship was reunited and granted in its entirety by Bruce to his oldest living sister Christina Bruce. Christina died in 1357 and the lordship of the Garioch was granted to Thomas, Earl of Mar by David II, after which it remained permanently attached to the Earldom of Mar.

== Geography ==
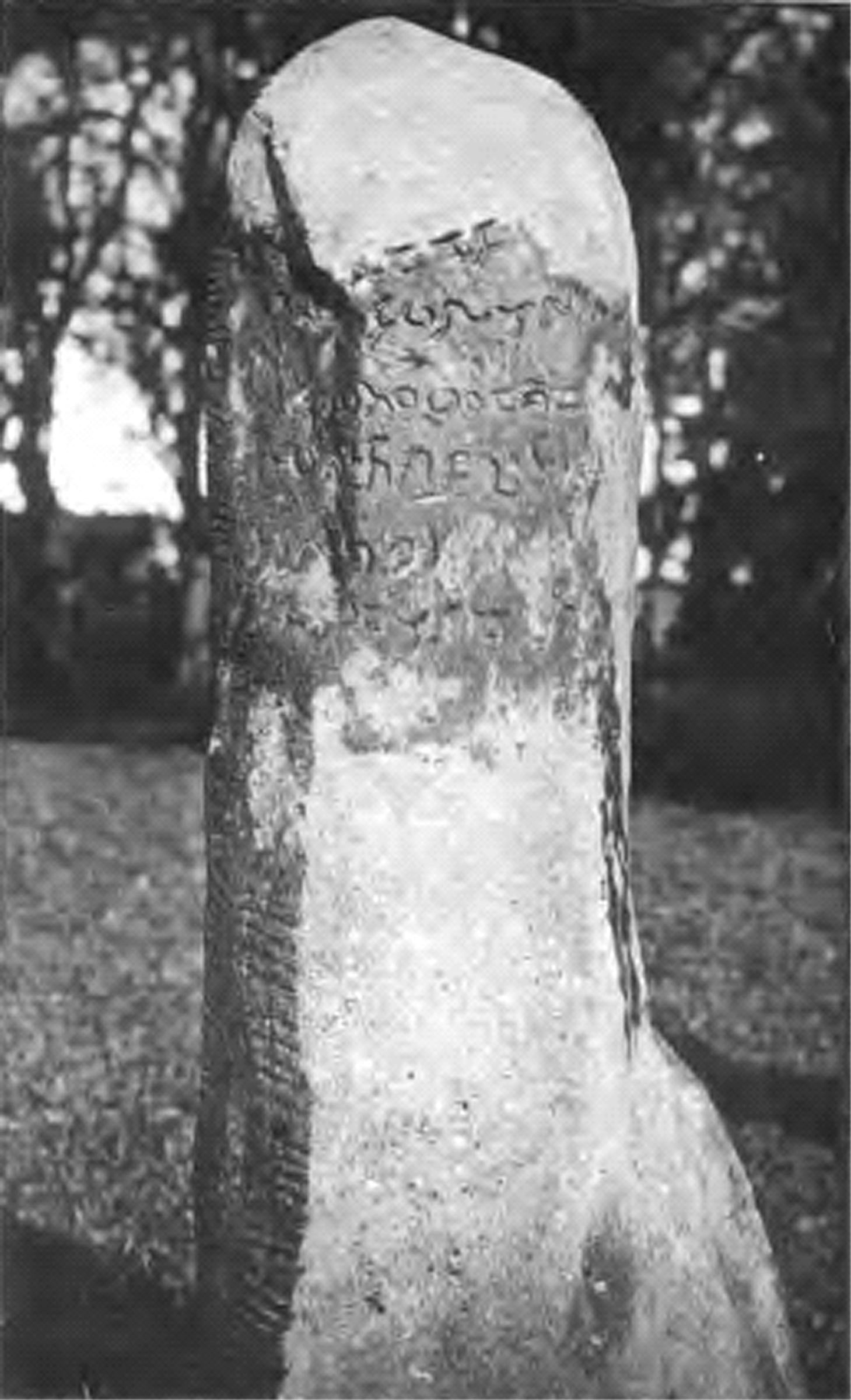
The Shevack inscription stone at Newton.

Centred on Inverurie, a traditional rural market town whose foundation dates back to the 9th century with the establishment of Christianity at Polnar, "The Kirk of Rocharl" – now St Andrew's Parish Church, Inverurie, "The Auld Kirk of Inverurie", the Garioch has also experienced rapid population growth due to its proximity to the city of Aberdeen. Significant growth in population, services and employment is anticipated in the A96 corridor and in Westhill. The area is largely agricultural, but is strongly affected by Aberdeen's economy and the oil and gas sector.

== Bibliography ==
- Dixon, Piers; Fraser, Iain (2008). "The Medieval and Later Landscape". In the shadow of Bennachie: a field archaeology of Donside, Aberdeenshire. Edinburgh: Royal Commission on the Ancient and Historical Monuments of Scotland. pp. 137–214. ISBN 978-1902419619.
- Stringer, K. J. (1985). Earl David of Huntingdon, 1152-1219: a study in Anglo-Scottish history. Edinburgh: Edinburgh University Press. ISBN 085224486X.
