= Archdiocese of Ljubljana =

Roman Catholic archdiocese in Slovenia

Coordinates: 46°3′2.27″N 14°30′27.44″E

Archdiocese of Ljubljana Archiodioecesis Labacensis Nadškofija Ljubljana

Catholic
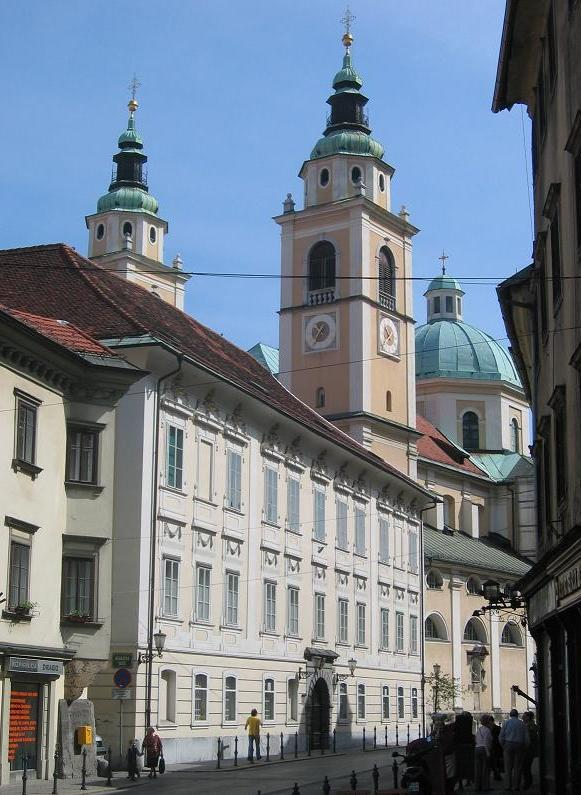
- The Bishop's Palace at Cyril and Methodius Square. In the background, Ljubljana Cathedral.

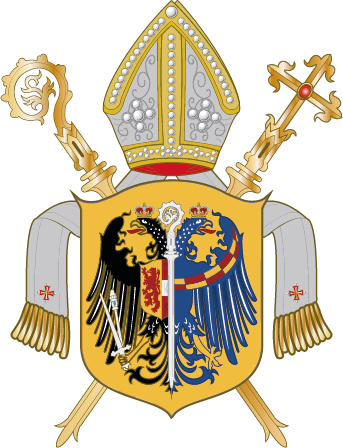
- Coat of arms

Location
- Country: Slovenia

Statistics
- Area: 5,608 km^{2} (2,165 sq mi)
- Population: Total; Catholics: (as of 2023); ▲822,580; ▼543,470 (▼66.1%)

Information
- Rite: Latin Rite
- Established: 6 December 1461
- Cathedral: St. Nicholas's Cathedral

Current leadership
- Pope: Leo XIV
- Metropolitan Archbishop: Stanislav Zore
- Suffragans: Diocese of Koper; Diocese of Novo Mesto
- Auxiliary Bishops: Anton Jamnik; Franc Šuštar
- Bishops emeritus: Anton Stres

Website
- Website of the Archdiocese

The Metropolitan Archdiocese of Ljubljana (Slovene: Nadškofija Ljubljana, Latin: Archidioecesis Labacensis) is a Latin ecclesiastical territory or diocese of the Catholic Church in Slovenia.

== Archdiocese ==
The archdiocese's motherchurch and thus seat of its archbishop is the Saint Nicholas Cathedral, Ljubljana; it also contains minor basilicas in Brezje and Stična. Since November 2014, the Archbishop of Ljubljana, and thus Primate of Slovenia, has been Stanislav Zore. He was appointed by Pope Francis on 4 October 2014 and succeeded Anton Stres. Anton Stres, who was appointed Archbishop of Ljubljana by Pope Benedict XVI on 28 November 2009, resigned in July 2013 due to his involvement in the financial fiasco of the Archdiocese of Maribor.

== History ==
An ancient diocese of Emona was founded in 320 but in the seventh century the see was transferred on the coast of Istria in the city of Cittanova to form a new diocese.

From 811, the territory of the Ljubljana Archdiocese was part of the ecclesiastical territory of the Patriarch of Aquileia. Frederick III, Holy Roman Emperor, erected on 6 December 1461 the Diocese of Laibach, which was confirmed six months later, on 6 September 1462, by Pope Pius II. Several days later, it was taken from the jurisdiction of the Patriarch of Aquileia and made directly subject to the Holy See. On 3 March 1787, it became an archdiocese and a metropolis by imperial decree, on March 8, 1788, it was canonically elevated to the rank of a metropolitan see by the bull In universa gregis of Pope Pius VI, having as suffragans the united dioceses of Senj and Modruš and the new Diocese of Gradisca; the latter was replaced in 1791 by the Diocese of Gorizia and Gradisca, and also in 1791 the Diocese of Trieste was added. However, on August 19, 1807, it was demoted to a diocese immediately subject to the Holy See by the bull Quaedam tenebrosa of Pope Pius VII.

The Nazi persecution of the Church in annexed Slovenia was akin to that which occurred in Poland. Within six weeks of the Nazi occupation, only 100 of the 831 priests in the Diocese of Maribor and part of the Diocese of Ljubljana remained free. Clergy were persecuted and sent to concentration camps, while religious orders had their properties seized.

The diocese was again elevated to an archdiocese by Pope John XXIII on 22 December 1961, and to a metropolis by Pope Paul VI on 22 November 1968. Today the archdiocese has two suffragan sees, Koper (since 1977) and Novo Mesto (since 2006). It is the principal see of Slovenia; one living former archbishop, Franc Rode, CM, was promoted to a Curial office (Prefect of the Congregation for Institutes of Consecrated Life and Societies of Apostolic Life) and made a Cardinal.

== List of bishops of Ljubljana ==
- Sigmund Lamberg (1463–1488)
- Krištof Ravbar (1488–1536)
- Franc Kacijanar (1536–1543)
- Urban Textor (Tkalec) (1543–1558)
- Peter Seebach (1558–1568)
- Konrad Adam Gluschitz (1571–1578)
- Baltazar Radlič (1579)
- Johann Tautscher (1580–1597)
- Thomas Chrön (1597–1630)
- Rinaldo Scarlichi (1630–1640)
- Otto Friedrich von Buchheim (1641–1664)
- Joseph Rabatta (1664–1683)
- Sigmund von Herberstein (1683–1701)
- Franz von Kuenburg (1701–1710)
- Franz Karl von Kaunitz (1710–1717)
- Wilhelm von Leslie (1718–1727)
- Sigmund Felix von Schrattenbach (1727–1742)
- Ernest Attems (1742–1757)
- Leopold Petazzi de Castel Nuovo (1760–1772)
- Johann Karl von Herberstein (1772–1787)
- Michel Brigido (1787–1807)
- Anton Kavčič (1807–1814)
- Augustin Johann Joseph Gruber (1815–1823)
- Anton Aloys Wolf (1824–1859)
- Jernej Vidmar (1860–1875)
- Janez Zlatoust Pogačar (1875–1884)
- Jakob Missia (1884–1898)
- Anton Bonaventura Jeglič (1898–1930)
- Gregorij Rožman (1930–1959)

== List of archbishops of Ljubljana ==
- Anton Vovk (1959–1963)
- Jožef Pogačnik (1964–1980)
- Alojzij Šuštar (1980–1997)
- Franc Rode, C.M. (1997–2004) (elevated to Cardinal in 2006)
  - Andrej Glavan, Apostolic Administrator (2004)
- Alojz Uran (2004–2009)
- Anton Stres, C.M. (2009–2013)
  - Andrej Glavan, Apostolic Administrator (2013–2014)
- Stane Zore, OFM (2014–present)

== Auxiliary bishops ==
- Michael Chumer (Chumberg), O.F.M. (1639–1651)
- Franc Jožef Mikolič (Mikolitsch) (1789–1793)
- Franz von Raigesfeld, S.J. (1795–1800)
- Johannes Antonius de Ricci (1801–1818)
- Anton Vovk (1946–1959) Appointed, Bishop of Ljubljana
- Jožef Pogačnik (1963–1964) Appointed, Archbishop of Ljubljana
- Stanislav Lenič (1967–1988)
- Jožef Kvas (1983–1999)
- Alojz Uran (1992–2004) Appointed, Archbishop of Ljubljana
- Andrej Glavan (2000–2006) Appointed, Bishop of Novo Mesto
- Anton Jamnik (2005–)
- Franc Šuštar (2015–)
