= Henchir-El-Meden =

Henchir-El-Meden is a locality and archaeological site in Tunisia.

== History ==
During antiquity The city was a municipium of the Roman province of Africa Proconsularis called Municipium Auralia Vina. The ruins include an amphitheatre dedicated to Marcus Aurelius and Lucius Verus.

During the Byzantine and Roman Empires Vina was also the seat of an ancient Christian episcopal see, suffragan to the Archdiocese of Carthage. Four bishops are attributable to Vina.

- Faustino participated in the Cabarsussi Council, held in 393 by Maximianus, a dissident sect of the Donatists, and signed the Acts of that council.
- At the Council of Carthage (411), the Catholic Vittore attended. The town had no Donatist as Faustino had died five years earlier (406).
- Cresconio attended the Council of Carthage (525) and
- Fruttuoso the anti-Monothelitism Council of Carthage (646).
- Vina survives today as a titular bishopric and the current bishop is Anton Jamnik, of Ljubljana.
