= Jack Leslie =

Jack Leslie is the name of:

- Jack Leslie (English footballer) (1901–1988), football player for Plymouth Argyle F.C.
- Jack Leslie (Australian footballer) (born 1995), plays for Gold Coast
- Jack Leslie (politician) (1920–2010), Canadian politician and businessman
- Sir John Leslie, 4th Baronet (1916–2016)
- Jack Leslie (public relations executive), American public relations executive

== See also ==
- John Leslie (disambiguation)
