= Joseph Rabatta =

Joseph von Rabatta (born 1624 in Gorizia) was an Italian clergyman and bishop of the diocese of Ljubljana (Laibach).

He was ordained a priest in 1664. He was appointed bishop on 23 June 1664, by Pope Alexander VII, and consecrated a bishop on 9 November 1664. He died in 1683.
