= Leslie Miller (cricketer) =

Australian cricketer

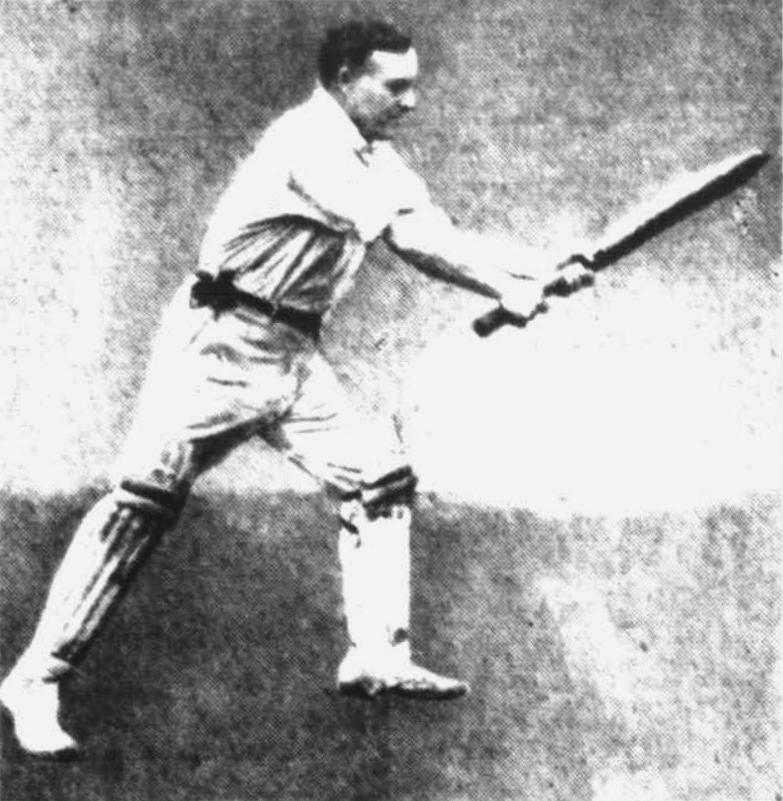

Personal information
- Born: 16 June 1880; Melbourne, Australia
- Died: 2 July 1963 (aged 83); Melbourne, Australia

Domestic team information
- Years: Team
- 1910: Victoria
- Source: Cricinfo, 16 November 2015

Leslie Miller (16 June 1880 – 2 July 1963) was an Australian cricketer. He played one first-class cricket match for Victoria in 1910.

== See also ==
- List of Victoria first-class cricketers
