= Leslie J. Edhlund =

American politician and mechanical engineer

Leslie J. Edhlund (December 21, 1911 – January 12, 1994) was an American politician and mechanical engineer.

Edhlund was born in Welcome, Martin County, Minnesota. He went to the Mechanic Art High School in Saint Paul, Minnesota and to Macalester College. Edhlund also went to the University of Minnesota and to the Dunwoody College of Technology. He lived in Saint Paul, Minnesota with his wife and family. Edhlund worked for 3M and was a mechanical engineer. Edhlund served in the Minnesota House of Representatives in 1963 and 1964.
