= Noel Corson's Oath =

1899 play written by Verna M. Raynor

Noel Corson's Oath; or Leonia's Repentance
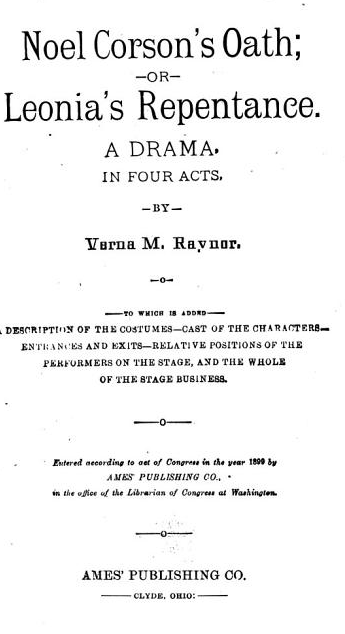
- Original language: English
- Written by: Verna M. Raynor
- Characters: Officer Brown; Noel Corson; Leonia Darrell; Mrs. Fairmount; Ora Fairmount; Leslie Harcourt; Mike Sparrow; Jonathan Raven; Harry Westlake
- Genre: Melodrama

Premiere
- Date: 1899
- Place: New York City
- Original run: 1899-1900

Noel Corson's Oath; or Leonia's Repentance is an 1899 play in four acts written by Verna M. Raynor. It was the first play in San Francisco to achieve a run of over five weeks, playing at the Grand Opera House for over three months. The play was first produced in 1899, running in New York City for over a year.

== Plot ==
The play begins with Ora Fairmount and her mother, Mrs. Fairmount, awaiting a visit from Leslie Harcourt, Ora's beau, who is returning from an unidentified city. The two women are accompanied by Ora's new friend, Leonia Darrell. Mrs. Fairmount expresses her concerns about Leslie's new secretary, Noel Corson, whose bearing and physical appearance remind Mrs. Fairmount of the last man to fill that position, who took his own life after it was discovered that he had been stealing from his employer. Unbeknownst to Mrs. Fairmount, Noel is the dead man's half-brother. Leslie arrives, and joyfully reunites with Ora- but he and Leonia seem to recognize each other. As it turns out, Leonia is an adventuress (in late 19th century parlance, a woman-often a con artist- who seeks money and/or social status through unscrupulous means). Three years ago, Leslie stopped Leonia and her brother from conning a wealthy man out of his money. Afterwards, Leonia's brother was killed in a shoot-out. Leonia decides to take her revenge. To do so, she seduces Noel into helping her. When she and Leslie are alone, Leonia drugs him. She forges a cheque to Leslie under the name of Alfred Brendon, a friend of Leslie's, in Leslie's handwriting. On an evening shortly thereafter, Leslie is arrested on suspicion of forgery, but is saved by his friend, Harry Westlake.

Some time passes. Leonia continues to spend time with Ora, who is still unaware of Leonia's true nature. Mrs. Fairmount believes Leslie is innocent, but will not allow Ora to marry him, as his reputation has been ruined as a consequence of the incident regarding the cheque. In the meantime, Leonia realizes that she has fallen for Leslie. In an attempt to suppress her feelings, Leonia demands Noel murder Alfred, intending to have Leslie framed for the crime. The next day, Mike Sparrow, an Irish servant, reveals to Noel that he has detected signs of Leonia's passion for Leslie, incensing Noel. Shortly there afterwards, the police arrive to arrest Leslie for murder. Just then, Leonia reveals the truth (excepting Noel's involvement) before all, sans the servants. Leslie initially believes that this act of repentance is just another con of Leonia's- but when a jealous Noel attempts to murder Leslie, Leonia dives in front of her beloved, and ends the play dying in the lap of Leslie, who is now convinced of Leonia's love for him.

Mike Sparrow and his fellow servant, Jonathan Raven, squabble throughout the first half of the play, providing a source of comic relief.

== Notable performances ==
In 1903, in Cornwall, Ontario, Canada, the play was performed at the local Recreation Hall. The production was positively received by audiences and reviewers.

In 1907, the play was performed in both Mapleton, Kansas and Moran, Kansas by the Elsmore Dramatic Club. The production was well received.

In 1933, in Sandusky, Ohio, the choir of First Congregational Church performed the play.

In 1935, in Montreal, Quebec Canada, Henry Atterberry's company performed the play at the Corona Hotel "Barn". The actress Rojina Manclark starred as Leonia Darrell, in a departure from the ingenues she was known for playing; audiences had not seen Manclark play a villainess prior to this production. Both her performance and the production were well received by critics.

In 1941, Henry Atterberry revived the play under the title "Beyond Pardon; or Noel Corson's Oath". Rojina Manclark reprised her role as Leonia. The production was positively received by The Montreal Star.

== Initial reception ==
During the play's initial touring period, small-town audiences found it so shocking that there were various attempts to prevent it from being performed.

== Cultural references ==
Chapter II of Quick Turnover, a memoir about life during the turn of the 20th century serialized in the Arizona Daily Star from 1939 to 1940, is chiefly dedicated to the anonymous author's reminisces about an amateur performance of Noel Corson's Oath staged by his brother around the very early 1900s.
