= Leslie Sears =

English cricketer

Personal information
- Full name: Leslie Daniel Sears
- Born: 12 January 1901; Wokingham, Berkshire, England
- Died: 27 June 1992 (aged 91); Amesbury Abbey, Wiltshire, England
- Batting: Left-handed
- Bowling: Unknown

Domestic team information
- Years: Team
- 1934–1935: Berkshire
- 1925: Essex

Career statistics
Competition	First-class
Matches	2
Runs scored	18
Batting average	4.50
100s/50s	–/–
Top score	16
Balls bowled	–
Wickets	–
Bowling average	–
5 wickets in innings	–
10 wickets in match	–
Best bowling	–
Catches/stumpings	–/–
- Source: Cricinfo, 27 October 2011

Leslie Daniel Sears (12 January 1901 – 27 June 1992) was an English cricketer who played as a left-handed batsman. He was born at Wokingham, Berkshire.

Sears made two first-class appearances for Essex against Worcestershire and Derbyshire in the 1925 County Championship, scoring 18 runs at an average of 4.50, with a high score of 16. He later played for Berkshire, making his debut for his native county against Wiltshire in the 1933 Minor Counties Championship. He played Minor counties cricket for Berkshire in 1934 and 1935, making thirteen appearances.

He died at Amesbury Abbey care home, Wiltshire on 27 June 1992. His son, also Leslie, played for Berkshire and later served as the county's chairman from 1983 to 2004. His grandsons, Jamie and Richard, also played for Berkshire.
