= John Leslie =

John Leslie may refer to:

== United Kingdom ==
- Sir John Leslie (physicist) (1766–1832), Scottish mathematician and physicist
- John Leslie (TV presenter) (born 1965), Scottish former television presenter
- John Leslie (bishop of Clogher) (1571–1671), Church of Scotland and Church of Ireland bishop
- John Leslie (bishop of Kilmore, Elphin and Ardagh) (1772–1854), Church of Ireland bishop
- John Leslie (cricketer, born 1888), English cricketer and British Army officer
- John Leslie (footballer) (born 1955), English footballer
- John Leslie (politician) (1873–1955), British Labour Party Member of Parliament for Sedgefield
- Sir John Leslie, 1st Baronet (1822–1916), Conservative Member of Parliament for Co. Monaghan, Ireland
- Sir John Leslie, 2nd Baronet (1857–1944), Irish landowner and soldier in the British Army
- Sir John Leslie, 4th Baronet (1916–2016), officer in the Irish Guards
- John Leslie, 1st Duke of Rothes (c. 1630–1681), Scottish nobleman
- John Leslie, 6th Earl of Rothes (1600–1641), Scottish nobleman
- John Leslie, 10th Earl of Rothes (1698–1767), British Army officer
- John Leslie, 11th Earl of Rothes (1744–1773), Scottish nobleman
- John Leslie (priest) (1868–1934), Dean of Lismore
- Shane Leslie (Sir John Randolph Leslie, 3rd Baronet, 1885–1971), Anglo-Irish soldier and writer
- John Leslie of Parkhill, involved in the murder of Cardinal David Beaton in 1546
- John Leslie, Lord Newton (1595-1651) Scottish judge and soldier killed at the Siege of Dundee

== Other places ==
- John A. Leslie (born 1940), Canadian philosopher
- John A. Leslie (Canadian politician), Ontario MPP for York East
- John Leslie (1919–2016), patron of Gippsland Art Gallery, Australia
- John Leslie (cricketer, born 1814), Irish cricketer and barrister
- John Leslie (director) (1945–2010), American porn actor, director and producer
- John Leslie (rugby union) (born 1970), New Zealand rugby union footballer who played for Scotland
- John Robert Leslie (academic) (1831–1881), Irish academic associated with Trinity College Dublin

== See also ==
- Jack Leslie (disambiguation)
- John Leslie Art Prize, an Australian art prize for landscape painting
- John Lesley (1527–1596), Scottish Roman Catholic bishop of Ross
- John Peter Lesley (1819–1903), American geologist
- John T. Lesley, pioneer in Tampa, Florida
