= Motte-and-bailey castle =

Medieval fortification

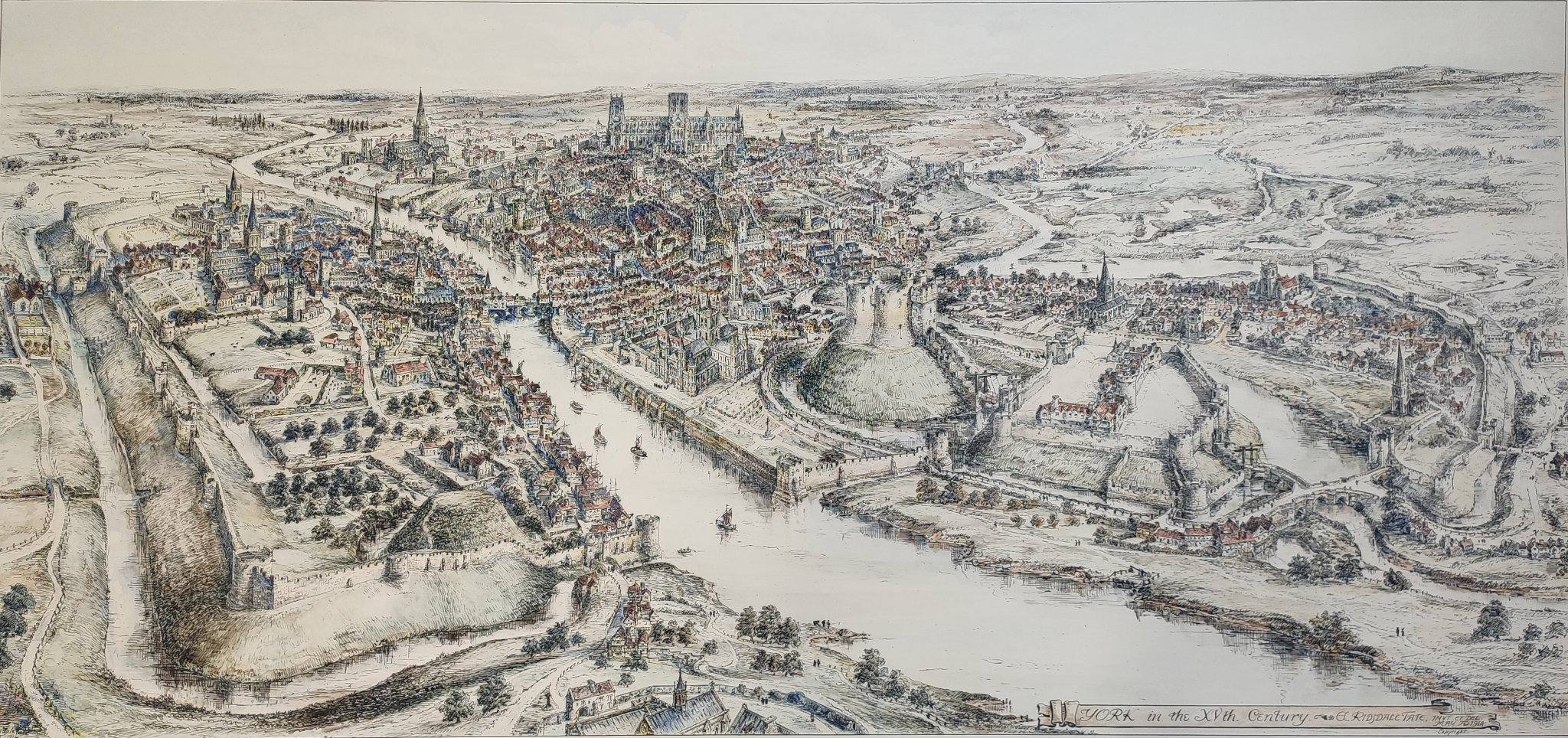
Reconstruction of the English city of York in the 15th century, showing the motte and bailey of York Castle on the right and another motte (Baile Hill) in the left foreground

Diagram of motte-and-bailey style layout

A motte-and-bailey castle is a European fortification with a wooden or stone keep situated on a raised area of ground called a motte, accompanied by a walled courtyard, or bailey, surrounded by a protective ditch and palisade. Relatively easy to build with unskilled labour, but still militarily formidable, these castles were built across northern Europe from the 10th century onwards, spreading from Normandy and Anjou in France, into the Holy Roman Empire, as well as the Low Countries it controlled, in the 11th century, when these castles were popularized in the area that became the Netherlands. The Normans introduced the design into England and Wales. Motte-and-bailey castles were adopted in Scotland, Ireland, and Denmark in the 12th and 13th centuries. By the end of the 13th century, the design was largely superseded by alternative forms of fortification, but the earthworks remain a prominent feature in many countries.

== Architecture ==
=== Structures ===
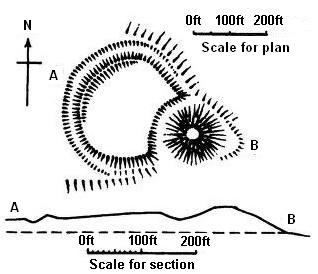
Plan of Topcliffe Castle in North Yorkshire, England, an archetypal motte-and-bailey design

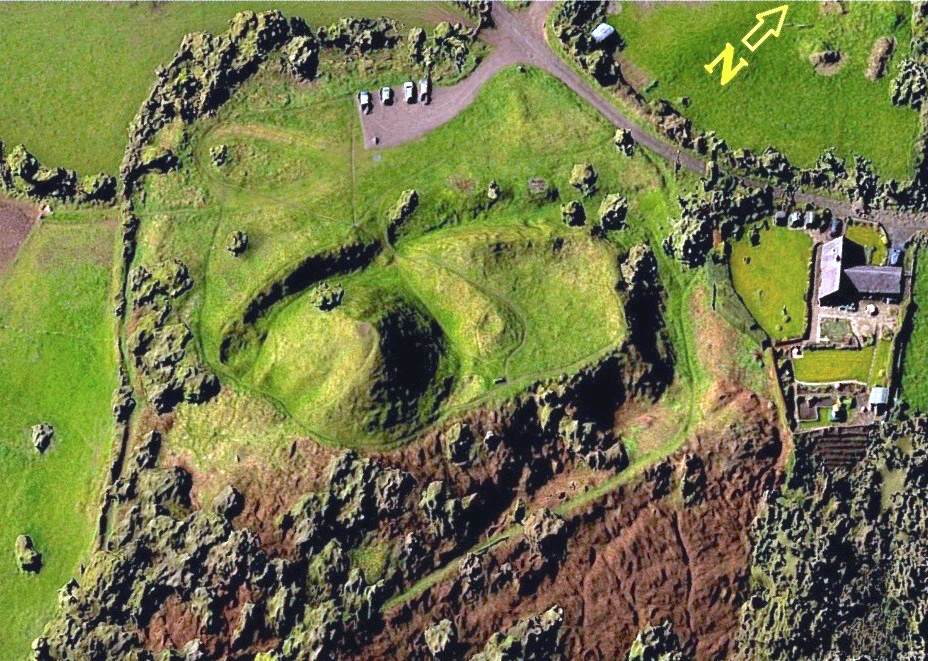
Castle Pulverbatch in Shropshire, England, was built in the 11th or 12th century and abandoned by 1202. This digital elevation model shows the motte just left of centre, with the bailey to the right (north-east) of it.

A motte-and-bailey castle was made up of two structures: a motte (a type of mound – often artificial – topped with a wooden or stone structure known as a keep); and at least one bailey (a fortified enclosure built next to the motte). The constructive elements themselves are ancient, but the term motte-and-bailey is a relatively modern one and is not medieval in origin. The word motte is the French version of the Latin mota, and in France, the word motte, generally used for a clump of turf, came to refer to a turf bank, and by the 12th century was used to refer to the castle design itself. The word "bailey" comes from the Norman-French baille, or basse-cour, referring to a low yard. In medieval sources, the Latin term castellum was used to describe the bailey complex within these castles.

One contemporary account of these structures comes from Jean de Colmieu around 1130, describing the Calais region in northern France. De Colmieu described how the nobles would build "a mound of earth as high as they can and dig a ditch about it as wide and deep as possible. The space on top of the mound is enclosed by a palisade of very strong hewn logs, strengthened at intervals by as many towers as their means can provide. Inside the enclosure is a citadel, or keep, which commands the whole circuit of the defences. The entrance to the fortress is by means of a bridge, which, rising from the outer side of the moat and supported on posts as it ascends, reaches to the top of the mound". At Durham Castle, contemporaries described how the motte-and-bailey superstructure arose from the "tumulus of rising earth" with a keep rising "into thin air, strong within and without" with a "stalwart house ... glittering with beauty in every part".

==== Motte ====
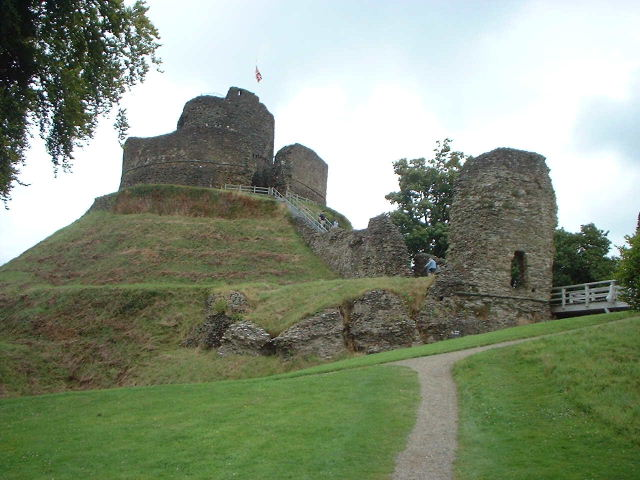
The motte and bailey defences of Launceston Castle in Cornwall, England

Mottes were made out of earth and flattened on top, and it can be very hard to determine whether a mound is artificial or natural without excavation. Some were also built over older artificial structures, such as Bronze Age barrows. The size of mottes varied considerably, with these mounds being 3 metres to 30 metres in height (10–100 feet), and from 30 to 90 metres (100 to 300 ft) in diameter. This minimum height of 3 metres (10 feet) for mottes is usually intended to exclude smaller mounds which often had non-military purposes. In England and Wales, only 7% of mottes were taller than 10 metres (33 feet) high; 24% were between 10 and 5 metres (33 and 16 ft), and 69% were less than 5 metres (16 feet) tall. A motte was protected by a ditch around it, which would typically have also been a source of the earth for constructing the mound itself.

A keep and a protective wall would usually be built on top of the motte. Some walls would be large enough to have a wall-walk around them, and the outer walls of the motte and the wall-walk could be strengthened by filling in the gap between the wooden walls with earth and stones, allowing it to carry more weight; this was called a garillum. Smaller mottes could support only simple towers with room for a few soldiers, whilst larger mottes could be equipped with a much grander building. Many wooden keeps were designed with bretèches, or brattices, small balconies that projected from the upper floors of the building, allowing defenders to cover the base of the keep wall. The early 12th-century chronicler Lambert of Ardres described the wooden keep on top of the motte at the castle of Ardres, where the "first storey was on the surface of the ground, where were cellars and granaries, and great boxes, tuns, casks, and other domestic utensils. In the storey above were the dwelling and common living rooms of the residents in which were the larders, the rooms of the bakers and butlers, and the great chamber in which the lord and his wife slept ... In the upper storey of the house were garret rooms ... In this storey also the watchmen and the servants appointed to keep the house took their sleep". Wooden structures on mottes could be protected by skins and hides to prevent their being easily set alight during a siege.

==== Bailey ====
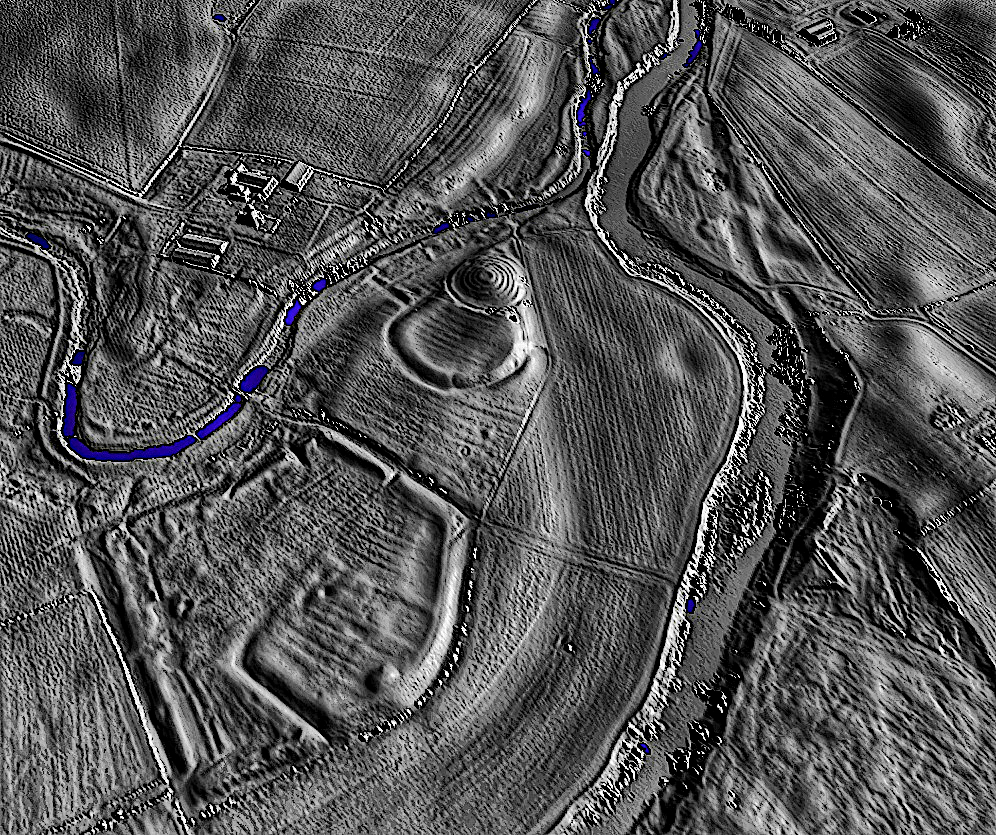
A lidar view of Topcliffe Castle and Cock Lodge in North Yorkshire

The bailey was an enclosed courtyard overlooked by the high motte and surrounded by a wooden fence called a palisade and another ditch. The bailey was often kidney-shaped to fit against a circular motte but could be made in other shapes according to the terrain. The bailey would contain a wide number of buildings, including a hall, kitchens, a chapel, barracks, stores, stables, forges or workshops, and was the centre of the castle's economic activity. The bailey was connected to the motte by a bridge, or, as often present in England, by steps cut into the motte. Typically the ditches of the motte and the bailey joined, forming a figure of eight around the castle. Wherever possible, nearby streams and rivers would be dammed or diverted, creating water-filled moats, artificial lakes and other forms of water defences.

In practice, there were numerous variations to this common design. A castle could have more than one bailey: at Warkworth Castle an inner and an outer bailey were constructed, or alternatively, several baileys could flank the motte, as at Windsor Castle. Some baileys had two mottes, such as those at Lincoln. Some mottes could be square instead of round, such as at Cabal Tump (Herefordshire). Instead of single ditches, occasionally double-ditch defences were built, as seen at Berkhamsted. Local geography and the intent of the builder produced many unique designs.

=== Construction and maintenance ===
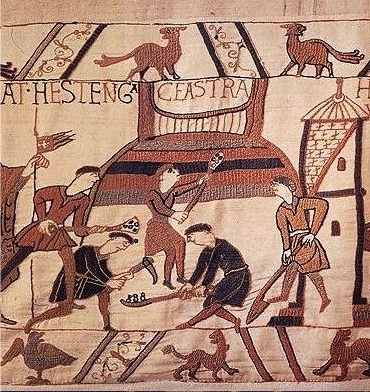
Building the motte of Hastings Castle (HESTENGA CEASTRA) in East Sussex, from the Bayeux Tapestry

Various methods were used to build mottes. Where a natural hill could be used, scarping could produce a motte without the need to create an artificial mound, but more commonly much of the motte would have to be constructed by hand. Four methods existed for building a mound and a tower: the mound could either be built first, and a tower placed on top of it; the tower could alternatively be built on the original ground surface and then buried within the mound; the tower could potentially be built on the original ground surface and then partially buried within the mound, the buried part forming a cellar beneath; or the tower could be built first, and the mound added later.

Regardless of the sequencing, artificial mottes had to be built by piling up earth; this work was undertaken by hand, using wooden shovels and hand-barrows, possibly with picks as well in the later periods. Larger mottes took disproportionately more effort to build than their smaller equivalents, because of the volumes of earth involved. The largest mottes in England, such as that of Thetford Castle, are estimated to have required up to 24,000 man-days of work; smaller ones required perhaps as little as 1,000. Contemporary accounts talk of some mottes being built in a matter of days, although these low figures have led to suggestions by historians that either these figures were an underestimate, or that they refer to the construction of a smaller design than that later seen on the sites concerned. Taking into account estimates of the likely available manpower during the period, historians estimate that the larger mottes might have taken between four and nine months to build. This contrasted favourably with stone keeps of the period, which typically took up to ten years to build. Very little skilled labour was required to build motte and bailey castles, which made them very attractive propositions if forced peasant labour was available, as was the case after the Norman invasion of England. Where the local workforce had to be paid – such as at Clones in Ireland, built in 1211 using imported labourers – the costs would rise quickly, in this case reaching £20.

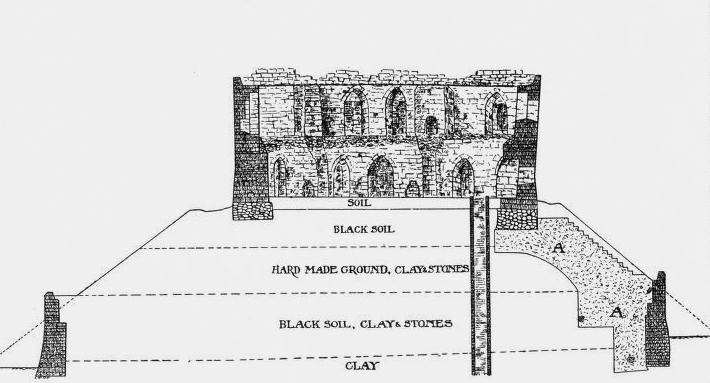
A cross-section showing the layers within the motte at Clifford's Tower in York: "A" marks the 20th-century concrete underpinnings of the motte; the low walls enclosing the base of the motte are a 19th-century addition.

The type of soil would make a difference to the design of the motte, as clay soils could support a steeper motte, whilst sandier soils meant that a motte would need a more gentle incline. Where available, layers of different sorts of earth, such as clay, gravel and chalk, would be used alternatively to build in strength to the design. Layers of turf could also be added to stabilise the motte as it was built up, or a core of stones placed as the heart of the structure to provide strength. Similar issues applied to the defensive ditches, where designers found that the wider the ditch was dug, the deeper and steeper the sides of the scarp could be, making it more defensive. Although militarily a motte was, as Norman Pounds describes it, "almost indestructible", they required frequent maintenance. Soil wash was a problem, particularly with steeper mounds, and mottes could be clad with wood or stone slabs to protect them. Over time, some mottes suffered from subsidence or damage from flooding, requiring repairs and stabilisation work.

Although motte-and-bailey castles are the best-known castle design, they were not always the most numerous in any given area. A popular alternative was the ringwork castle, involving a palisade being built on top of a raised earth rampart, protected by a ditch. The choice of motte and bailey or ringwork was partially driven by terrain, as mottes were typically built on low ground, and on deeper clay and alluvial soils. Another factor may have been speed, as ringworks were faster to build than mottes. Some ringwork castles were later converted into motte-and-bailey designs, by filling in the centre of the ringwork to produce a flat-topped motte. The reasons for why this decision was taken are unclear; motte-and-bailey castles may have been felt to be more prestigious, or easier to defend; another theory is that like the terpen in the Netherlands, or Vorburg and Hauptburg in Lower Rhineland, raising the height of the castle was done to create a drier site.

== History ==
=== Emergence of the design ===
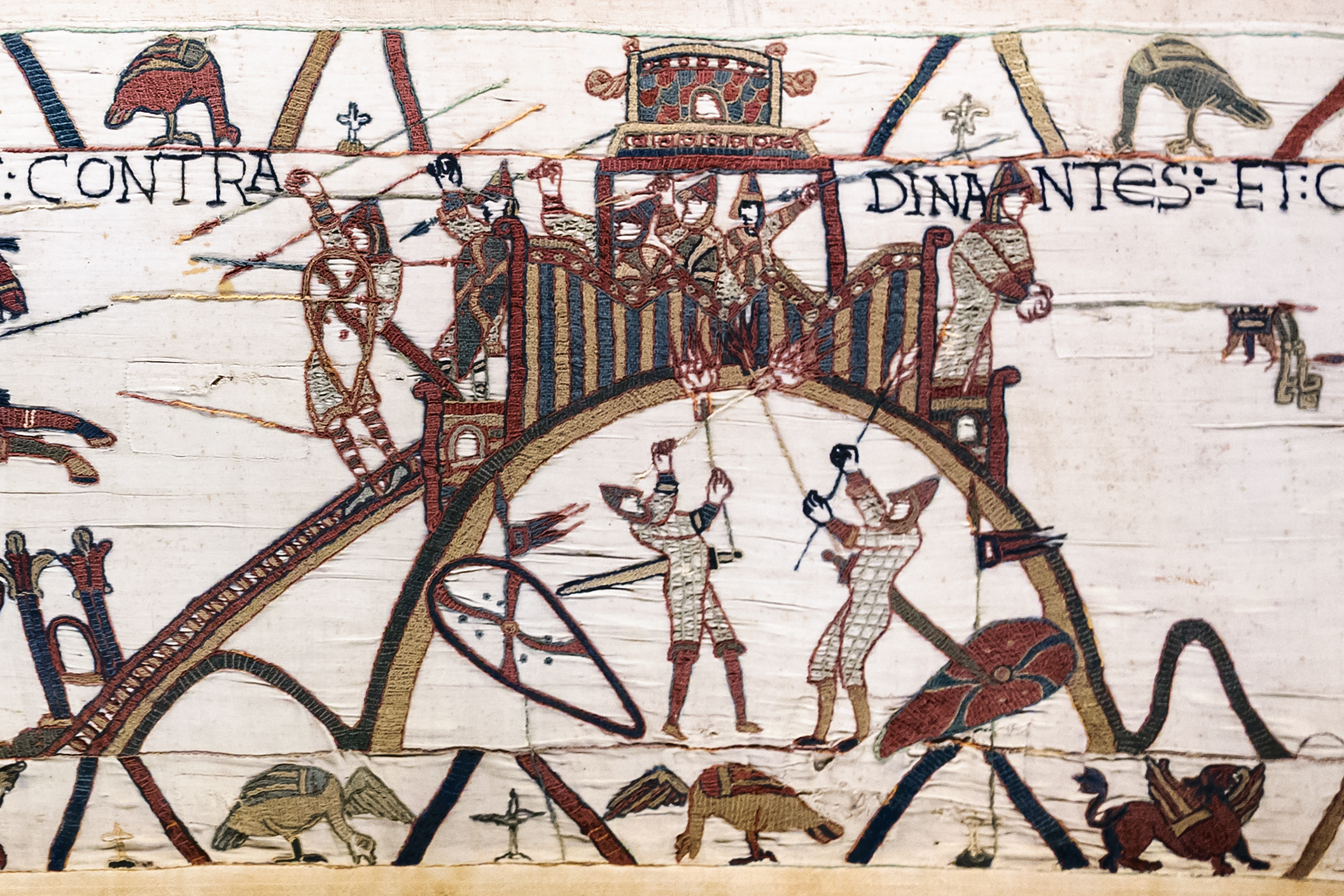
A Bayeux Tapestry scene depicting an attack on the Château de Dinan in Brittany, shown with a wooden palisade surmounting the summit of the motte

The motte-and-bailey castle is a particularly western and northern European phenomenon, most numerous in France and Britain, but also present in Denmark, Germany, Southern Italy and occasionally beyond. European castles first emerged between the Loire river and the Rhine in the 9th and 10th centuries, after the fall of the Carolingian Empire resulted in its territory being divided among individual lords and princes and local territories became threatened by the Magyars and the Norse. Against this background, various explanations have been put forward to explain the origins and spread of the motte-and-bailey design across western and northern Europe; there is often a tension among the academic community between explanations that stress military and social reasons for the rise of this design. One suggestion is that these castles were built particularly in order to protect against external attack – the Angevins, it is argued, began to build them to protect against the Viking raids, and the design spread to deal with the attacks along the Slav and Hungarian frontiers. Another argument is that, given the links between this style of castle and the Norman style, who were of Viking descent, it was in fact originally a Viking design, transported to Normandy and Anjou. The motte-and-bailey castle was certainly effective against assault, although as historian André Debord suggests, the historical and archaeological record of the military operation of motte-and-bailey castles remains relatively limited.

An alternative approach focuses on the links between this form of castle and what can be termed a feudal mode of society. The spread of motte-and-bailey castles was usually closely tied to the creation of local fiefdoms and feudal landowners, and areas without this method of governance rarely built these castles. Yet another theory suggests that the design emerged as a result of the pressures of space on ringworks and that the earliest motte-and-baileys were converted ringworks. (Note: Ringworks require an inner scarp, or sloping face; this means that the interior space is always less than a flat-topped motte of equivalent height and width. In-filling ringworks certainly occurred later, and may have been the initial step as well.) Finally, there may be a link between the local geography and the building of motte-and-bailey castles, which are usually built on low-lying areas, in many cases subject to regular flooding. Regardless of the reasons behind the initial popularity of the motte-and-bailey design, however, there is widespread agreement that the castles were first widely adopted in Normandy and Angevin territory in the 10th and 11th centuries.

=== Initial development, 10th and 11th centuries ===
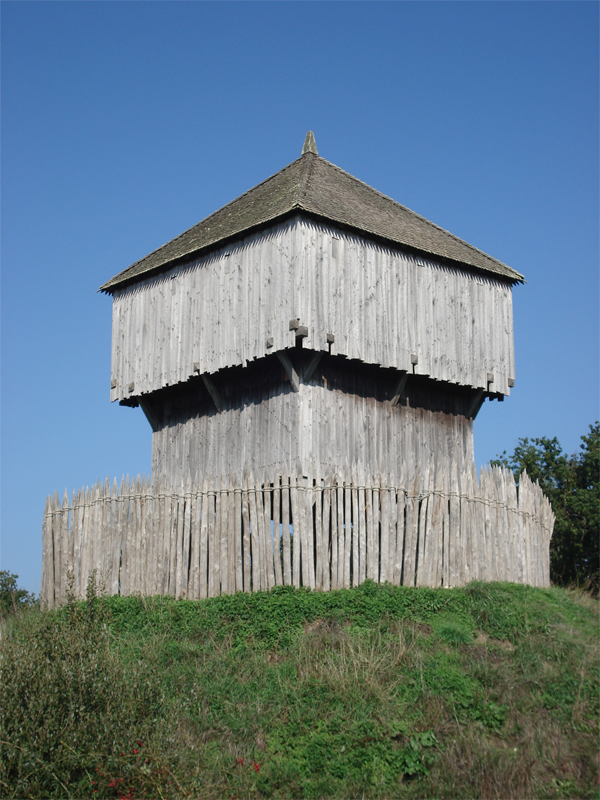
Reconstructed wooden keep at Saint-Sylvain-d'Anjou, France

The earliest purely documentary evidence for motte-and-bailey castles in Normandy and Angers comes from between 1020 and 1040, but a combination of documentary and archaeological evidence pushes the date for the first motte and bailey castle, at Vincy, back to 979. The castles were built by the more powerful lords of Anjou in the late 10th and 11th centuries, in particular Fulk III and his son, Geoffrey II, who built a great number of them between 987 and 1060. Many of these earliest castles would have appeared quite crude and rustic by later standards, belying the power and prestige of their builders. William the Conqueror, as the Duke of Normandy, is believed to have adopted the motte-and-bailey design from neighbouring Anjou. Duke William went on to prohibit the building of castles without his consent through the Consuetudines et Justicie, with his legal definition of castles centring on the classic motte-and-bailey features of ditching, banking and palisading.

By the 11th century, castles were built throughout the Holy Roman Empire, which then spanned central Europe. They now typically took the form of an enclosure on a hilltop, or, on lower ground, a tall, free-standing tower (German Bergfried). The largest castles had well-defined inner and outer courts, but no mottes. The motte-and-bailey design began to spread into Alsace and the northern Alps from France during the first half of the 11th century, spreading further into Bohemia and Austria in the subsequent years. This form of castle was closely associated with the colonisation of newly cultivated areas within the Empire, as new lords were granted lands by the emperor and built castles close to the local gród, or town. Motte-and-bailey castle building substantially enhanced the prestige of local nobles, and it has been suggested that their early adoption was because they were a cheaper way of imitating the more prestigious Höhenburgen built on high ground, but this is usually regarded as unlikely. In many cases, bergfrieds were converted into motte and bailey designs by burying existing castle towers within the mounds.

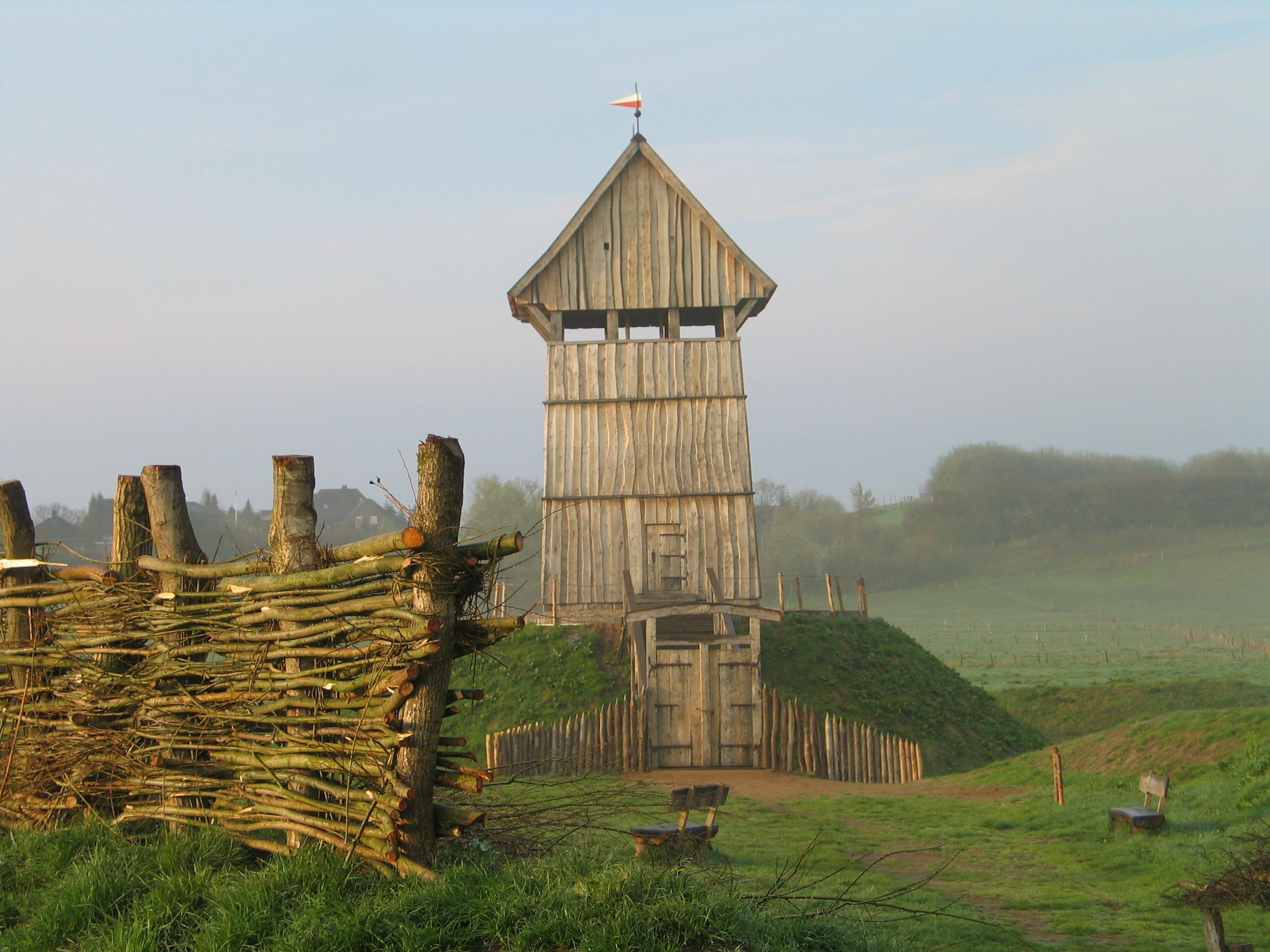
Reconstructed Bergfried at Lütjenburg, Germany

In England, William invaded from Normandy in 1066, resulting in three phases of castle building in England, around 80% of which were in the motte-and-bailey pattern. The first of these was the establishment by the new king of royal castles in key strategic locations, including many towns. These urban castles could make use of the existing town's walls and fortification, but typically required the demolition of local houses to make space for them. This could cause extensive damage: records suggest that in Lincoln 166 houses were destroyed in the construction of Lincoln Castle, and that 113 were destroyed for the castle in Norwich and 27 for the castle in Cambridge. The second and third waves of castle building in the late-11th century were led by the major magnates and then the more junior knights on their new estates. Some regional patterns in castle building can be seen – relatively few castles were built in East Anglia compared to the west of England or the Marches, for example; this was probably due to the relatively settled and prosperous nature of the east of England and reflected a shortage of unfree labour for constructing mottes. In Wales, the first wave of the Norman castles was again predominantly made of wood in a mixture of motte-and-bailey and ringwork designs. The Norman invaders spread up the valleys, using this form of castle to occupy their new territories. After the Norman conquest of England and Wales, the building of motte-and-bailey castles in Normandy accelerated as well, resulting in a broad swath of these castles across the Norman territories, around 741 motte-and-bailey castles in England and Wales alone.

=== Further expansion, 12th and 13th centuries ===
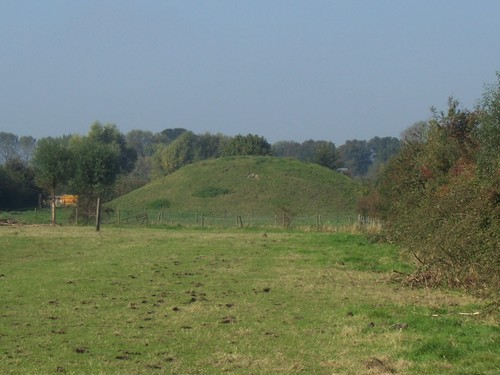
A vliedburg motte or 'refuge castle' in the Netherlands, i.e. one not permanently occupied

Having become well established in Normandy, Germany and Britain, motte-and-bailey castles began to be adopted elsewhere, mainly in northern Europe, during the 12th and 13th centuries. Conflict through the Low Countries encouraged castle building in a number of regions from the late 12th century to the 14th century. In Flanders, the first motte and bailey castles began relatively early at the end of the 11th century. The rural motte-and-bailey castles followed the traditional design, but the urban castles often lacked the traditional baileys, using parts of the town to fulfil this role instead. Motte-and-bailey castles in Flanders were particularly numerous in the south along the Lower Rhine, a fiercely contested border. Further along the coast in Friesland, the relatively decentralised, egalitarian society initially discouraged the building of motte and bailey castles, although terpen, raised "dwelling mounds" which lacked towers and were usually lower in height than a typical motte, were created instead. By the end of the medieval period, however, the terpen gave way to hege wieren, non-residential defensive towers, often on motte-like mounds, owned by the increasingly powerful nobles and landowners. On Zeeland the local lords had a high degree of independence during the 12th and 13th centuries, owing to the wider conflict for power between neighbouring Flanders and Friesland. The Zeeland lords had also built terpen mounds, but these gave way to larger werven constructions–effectively mottes–which were later termed bergen. Sometimes both terpen and werven are called vliedburg, or "refuge castles". During the 12th and 13th centuries a number of terpen mounds were turned into werven mottes, and some new werven mottes were built from scratch. Around 323 known or probable motte and bailey castles of this design are believed to have been built within the borders of the modern Netherlands.

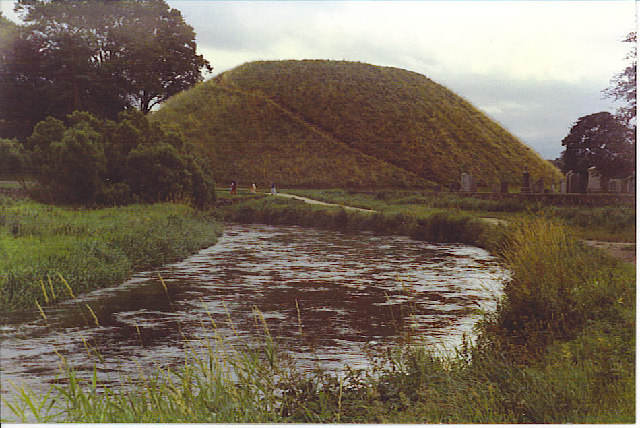
The Bass of Inverurie in Aberdeenshire, Scotland, a large mid-12th-century motte-and-bailey castle

In neighbouring Denmark, motte-and-bailey castles appeared somewhat later in the 12th and 13th centuries and in more limited numbers than elsewhere, due to the less feudal society. Except for a handful of motte and bailey castles in Norway, built in the first half of the 11th century and including the royal residence in Oslo, the design did not play a role further north in Scandinavia.

The Norman expansion into Wales slowed in the 12th century but remained an ongoing threat to the remaining native rulers. In response, the Welsh princes and lords began to build their own castles, frequently motte-and-bailey designs, usually in wood. There are indications that this may have begun from 1111 onwards under Prince Cadwgan ap Bleddyn, with the first documentary evidence of a native Welsh castle being at Cymmer in 1116. These timber castles, including Tomen y Rhodywdd, Tomen y Faerdre, Gaer Penrhôs, were of equivalent quality to the equivalent Norman fortifications in the area, and it can prove difficult to distinguish the builders of some sites from the archaeological evidence alone.

Motte-and-bailey castles in Scotland emerged as a consequence of the centralising of royal authority in the 12th century. David I encouraged Norman and French nobles to settle in Scotland, introducing a feudal mode of landholding and the use of castles as a way of controlling the contested lowlands. The quasi-independent polity of Galloway, which had resisted the rule of David and his predecessors, was a particular focus for this colonisation. The size of these Scottish castles, primarily wooden motte and bailey constructions, varied considerably, from larger designs such as the Bass of Inverurie to smaller castles like Balmaclellan.

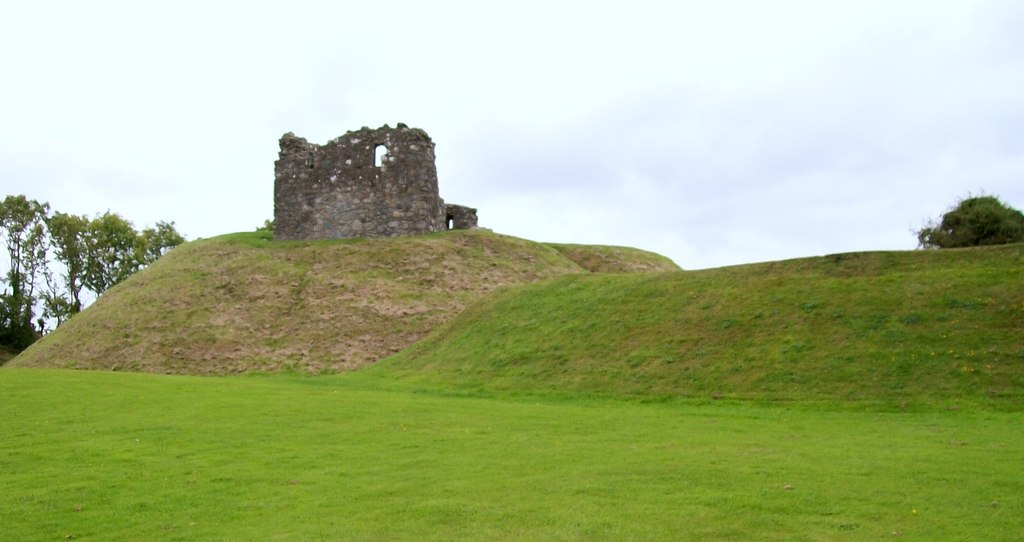
The motte (left) and bailey (right) of Clough Castle in County Down, Northern Ireland

Motte-and-bailey castles were introduced to Ireland following the Norman invasion of Ireland that began between 1166 and 1171 under first Richard de Clare and then Henry II of England, with the occupation of southern and eastern Ireland by a number of Anglo-Norman barons. The rapid Norman success depended on key economic and military advantages; their cavalry enabled Norman successes in battles, and castles enabled them to control the newly conquered territories. The new lords rapidly built castles to protect their possessions; most of these were motte-and-bailey constructions, many of them strongly defended. Unlike Wales, the indigenous Irish lords do not appear to have constructed their own castles in any significant number during the period. (Note: There has been some debate over the absence of indigenous Irish castle building. Irish castle specialist Tom McNeill has noted that it would appear very strange if the indigenous Irish lords had not adopted castle technology during their long struggle with the Anglo-Norman nobility, but there is no significant archaeological or historical evidence to show such construction.) Between 350 and 450 motte-and-bailey castles are believed to remain today, although the identification of these earthwork remains can be contentious.

A small number of motte-and-bailey castles were built outside of northern Europe. In the late-12th century, the Normans invaded southern Italy and Sicily; although they had the technology to build more modern designs, in many cases wooden motte-and-bailey castles were built instead for reasons of speed. The Italians came to refer to a range of different castle types as motta, however, and there may not have been as many genuine motte-and-bailey castles in southern Italy as was once thought on the basis of the documentary evidence alone. In addition, there is evidence of the Norman crusaders building a motte and bailey using sand and wood in Egypt in 1221 during the Fifth Crusade.

=== Conversion and decline, 13th–14th centuries ===
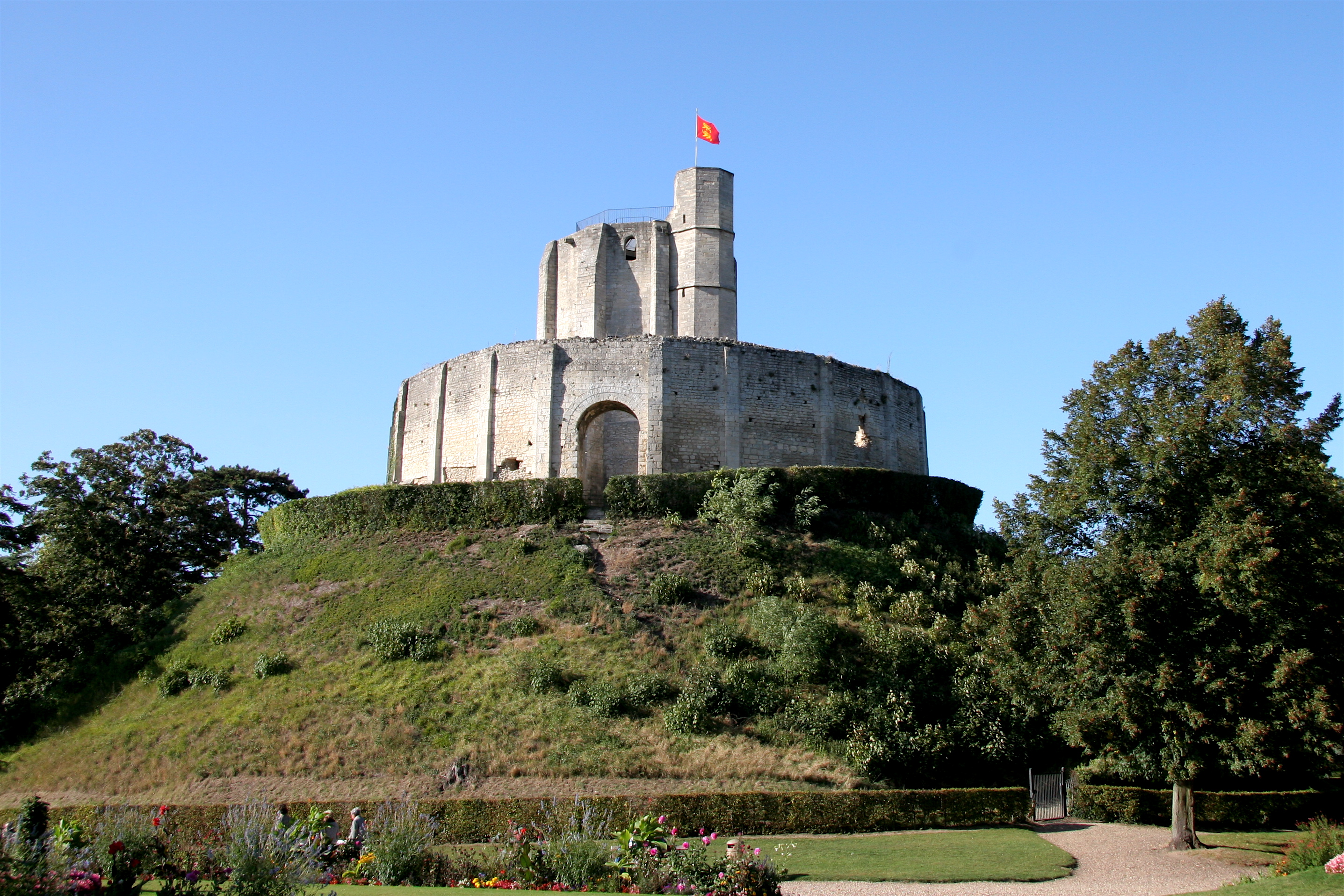
The stone shell keep and chemise (curtain wall) on top of the motte at Gisors, France

Motte-and-bailey castles became a less popular design in the mid-medieval period. In France, they were not built after the start of the 12th century, and mottes ceased to be built in most of England after around 1170, although they continued to be erected in Wales and along the Marches. Many motte-and-bailey castles were occupied relatively briefly; in England, many had been abandoned or allowed to lapse into disrepair by the 12th century. In the Low Countries and Germany, a similar transition occurred in the 13th and 14th centuries.

One factor was the introduction of stone into castle buildings. The earliest stone castles had emerged in the 10th century, with stone keeps being built on mottes along the Catalonia frontier and several, including Château de Langeais, in Angers. Although wood was a more powerful defensive material than was once thought, stone became increasingly popular for military and symbolic reasons. Some existing motte-and-bailey castles were converted to stone, with the keep and the gatehouse usually the first parts to be upgraded. Shell keeps were built on many mottes, circular stone shells running around the top of the motte, sometimes protected by a further chemise, or low protective wall, around the base. By the 14th century, a number of motte and bailey castles had been converted into powerful stone fortresses.

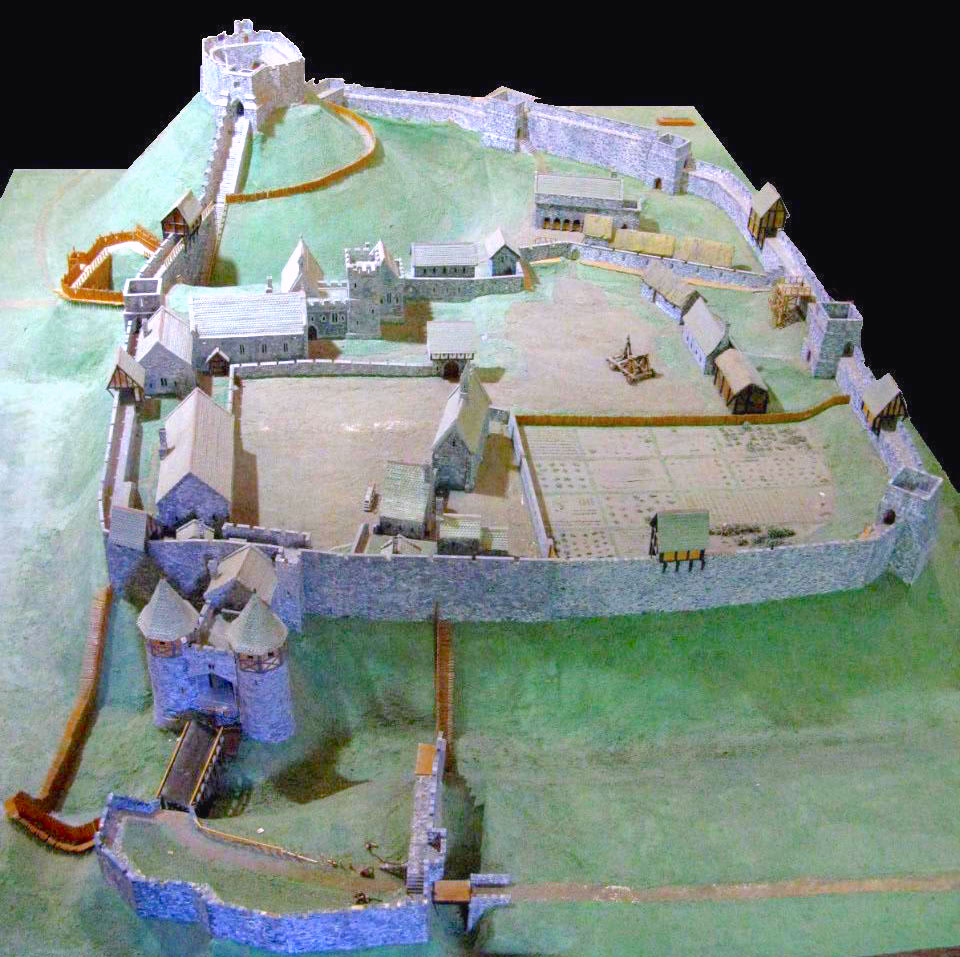
Reconstruction of Carisbrooke Castle on the Isle of Wight in the 14th century, showing the keep built atop the motte (top left), and the walled-in bailey below

Newer castle designs placed less emphasis on mottes. Square Norman keeps built in stone became popular following the first such construction in Langeais in 994. Several were built in England and Wales after the conquest; by 1216 there were around 100 in the country. These massive keeps could be either erected on top of settled, well-established mottes or could have mottes built around them – so-called "buried" keeps. The ability of mottes, especially newly built mottes, to support the heavier stone structures, was limited, and many needed to be built on fresh ground. Concentric castles, relying on several lines of baileys and defensive walls, made increasingly little use of keeps or mottes at all.

Across Europe, motte-and-bailey construction came to an end. At the end of the 12th century, the Welsh rulers began to build castles in stone, primarily in the principality of North Wales and usually along the higher peaks where mottes were unnecessary. In Flanders, a decline came in the 13th century as feudal society changed. In the Netherlands, cheap brick started to be used in castles from the 13th century onwards in place of earthworks, and many mottes were levelled, to help develop the surrounding, low-lying fields; these "levelled mottes" are a particularly Dutch phenomenon. In Denmark, motte and baileys gave way in the 14th century to a castrum-curia model, where the castle was built with a fortified bailey and a fortified mound, somewhat smaller than the typical motte. By the 12th century, the castles in Western Germany began to thin in number, due to changes in land ownership, and various mottes were abandoned. In Germany and Denmark, motte-and-bailey castles also provided the model for the later wasserburg, or "water castle", a stronghold and bailey construction surrounded by water, and widely built in the late medieval period.

=== Today ===
In England, motte-and-bailey earthworks were put to various uses over later years; in some cases, mottes were turned into garden features in the 18th century, or reused as military defences during the Second World War. Today, almost no mottes of motte-and-bailey castles remain in regular use in Europe, with one of the few exceptions being that at Windsor Castle, converted for the storage of royal documents. Another example is Durham Castle in northern England, where the round tower is used for student accommodation.

The landscape of northern Europe remains scattered with mottes and their earthworks, and many form popular tourist attractions.

== See also ==
- Japanese castles — generally constructed atop mounds, similarly to a motte-and-bailey castle
- List of motte-and-bailey castles
- Motte-and-bailey fallacy

== Bibliography ==
- Armitage, Ella S. (1912) The Early Norman Castles of the British isles. London: J. Murray. OCLC 458514584.
- Besteman, Jan. C. (1984) "Mottes in the Netherland," in Château Gaillard: études de castellologie médiévale. XII. pp. 211–224.
- Bradbury, Jim. (2009) Stephen and Matilda: the Civil War of 1139–53. Stroud, UK: The History Press. ISBN 978-0-7509-3793-1.
- Brown, R. Allen. (1962) English Castles. London: Batsford. OCLC 1392314.
- Brown, R. Allen. (1989) Castles From the Air. Cambridge: Cambridge University Press. ISBN 978-0-521-32932-3.
- Brown, R. Allen. (2004) Allen Brown's English Castles. Woodbridge, UK: Boydell Press. ISBN 978-1-84383-069-6.
- Butler, Lawrence. (1997) Clifford's Tower and the Castles of York. London: English Heritage. ISBN 1-85074-673-7.
- Carpenter, David. (2004) Struggle for Mastery: The Penguin History of Britain 1066–1284. London: Penguin. ISBN 978-0-14-014824-4. doi:10.1017/9781846152429
- Châtelain, André. (1983) Châteaux Forts et Féodalité en Ile de France, du XIème au XIIIème siècle. Nonette: Créer. ISBN 978-2-902894-16-1. (in French)
- Colardelle, Michel and Chantal Mazard. (1982) "Les mottes castrales et l'évolution des pouvoirs dans le Alpes du Nord. Aux origines de la seigneurie," in Château Gaillard: études de castellologie médiévale. XI, pp. 69–89. (in French)
- Cooper, Thomas Parsons. (1911) The History of the Castle of York, from its Foundation to the Current Day with an Account of the Building of Clifford's Tower. London: Elliot Stock. OCLC 4246355.
- Creighton, Oliver Hamilton. (2005) Castles and Landscapes: Power, Community and Fortification in Medieval England. London: Equinox. ISBN 978-1-904768-67-8.
- Creighton, Oliver Hamilton and Robert Higham. (2003) Medieval Castles. Princes Risborough, UK: Shire Publications. ISBN 978-0-7478-0546-5.
- Debord, André. (1982) "A propos de l'utilisation des mottes castrales," in Château Gaillard: études de castellologie médiévale. XI, pp. 91–99. (in French)
- DeVries, Kelly. (2003) Medieval Military Technology. Toronto, Canada: University of Toronto Press. ISBN 978-0-921149-74-3.
- Ekroll, Oystein. (1996) "Norwegian medieval castles: building on the edge of Europe," in Château Gaillard: études de castellologie médiévale. XVIII, pp. 65–73.
- Héricher, Anne-Marie Flambard. (2002) "Fortifications de terre et résidences en Normandie," in Château Gaillard: études de castellologie médiévale. XX pp. 87–100. (in French)
- Hulme, Richard (2008), "Twelfth Century Great Towers – The Case for the Defence" (PDF), The Castle Studies Group Journal, 21: 209–229
- Jansen, Walter. (1981) "The international background of castle building in Central Europe," in Skyum-Nielsen and Lund (eds) (1981).
- Kaufmann, J. E. and H. W. Kaufmann. (2004) The Medieval Fortress: castles, forts and walled cities of the Middle Ages. Cambridge, US: Da Capo. ISBN 978-0-306-81358-0.
- Kenyon, John R. (2005) Medieval Fortifications. London: Continuum. ISBN 978-0-8264-7886-3.
- King, D. J. Cathcart. (1972) "The field archaeology of mottes in England and Wales: eine kurze übersichte," in Château Gaillard: études de castellologie médiévale. V, pp. 107–111
- King, D. J. Cathcart. (1991) [1988] The Castle in England and Wales: An Interpretative History. London: Routledge. ISBN 0-415-00350-4.
- Lepage, Jean-Denis. (2002) Castles and Fortified Cities of Medieval Europe: an illustrated history. Jefferson, US: McFarland. ISBN 978-0-7864-1092-7.
- Liddiard, Robert. (ed) (2003a) Anglo-Norman Castles. Woodbridge, UK: Boydell Press. ISBN 978-0-85115-904-1.
- Liddiard, Robert. (2005) Castles in Context: Power, Symbolism and Landscape, 1066 to 1500. Macclesfield, UK: Windgather Press. ISBN 0-9545575-2-2.
- Lowry, Bernard. Discovering Fortifications: From the Tudors to the Cold War. Risborough, UK: Shire Publications. ISBN 978-0-7478-0651-6.
- McNeill, Tom. (2000) Castles in Ireland: Feudal Power in a Gaelic World. London: Routledge. ISBN 978-0-415-22853-4.
- De Meulemeester, Johnny. (1982) "Mottes Castrales du Comté de Flandres: État de la question d'apr les fouilles récent," Château Gaillard: études de castellologie médiévale. XI, pp. 101–115. (in French)
- Nicolle, David. (1984) The Age of Charlemagne. Oxford: Osprey. ISBN 978-0-85045-042-2.
- Nicholson, Helen J. (2004) Medieval Warfare: theory and practice of war in Europe, 300–1500. Basingstoke, UK: Palgrave Macmillan. ISBN 978-0-333-76330-8.
- O'Conor, Kieran. (2002) "Motte Castles in Ireland, Permanent fortresses, Residences and Manorial Centres," in Château Gaillard: études de castellologie médiévale. XX, pp. 173–182. (in French)
- Pettifer, Adrian. (2000) Welsh Castles: a Guide by Counties. Woodbridge, UK: Boydell Press. ISBN 978-0-85115-778-8.
- Pounds, Norman John Greville. (1994) The Medieval Castle in England and Wales: a social and political history. Cambridge: Cambridge University Press. ISBN 978-0-521-45828-3.
- Pringle, Denys. "A castle in the sand: mottes in the Crusader east," in Château Gaillard: études de castellologie médiévale. XVIII, pp. 187–190.
- Purton, Peter. (2009) A History of the Early Medieval Siege, c.450-1200. Woodbridge, UK: Boydell Press. ISBN 978-1-84383-448-9.
- Robinson, John Martin. (2010) Windsor Castle: the Official Illustrated History. London: Royal Collection Publications. ISBN 978-1-902163-21-5.
- Skyum-Nielsen, Niels and Niels Lund (eds) (1981) Danish Medieval History: New Currents. Københavns, Denmark: Museum Tusculanum Press. ISBN 978-87-88073-30-0.
- Simpson, Grant G. and Bruce Webster. (2003) "Charter Evidence and the Distribution of Mottes in Scotland," in Liddiard (ed) (2003a).
- Stiesdal, Hans. (1981) "Types of public and private fortifications in Denmark," in Skyum-Nielsen and Lund (eds) (1981).
- Tabraham, Chris J. (2005) Scotland's Castles. London: Batsford. ISBN 978-0-7134-8943-9.
- Toy, Sidney. (1985) Castles: Their Construction and History. ISBN 978-0-486-24898-1.
- Van Houts, Elisabeth M. C. (2000) The Normans in Europe. Manchester: Manchester University Press. ISBN 978-0-7190-4751-0.
- Wyeth, William. (2018) "Medieval Timber Motte Towers," in Medieval Archaeology. 62 (1), pp. 135–156. doi:10.1080/00766097.2018.1451594
