= Johann Karl von Herberstein =

18th-century Catholic bishop

His Excellency Johann Karl von Herberstein
- Prince-Bishop of Ljubljana
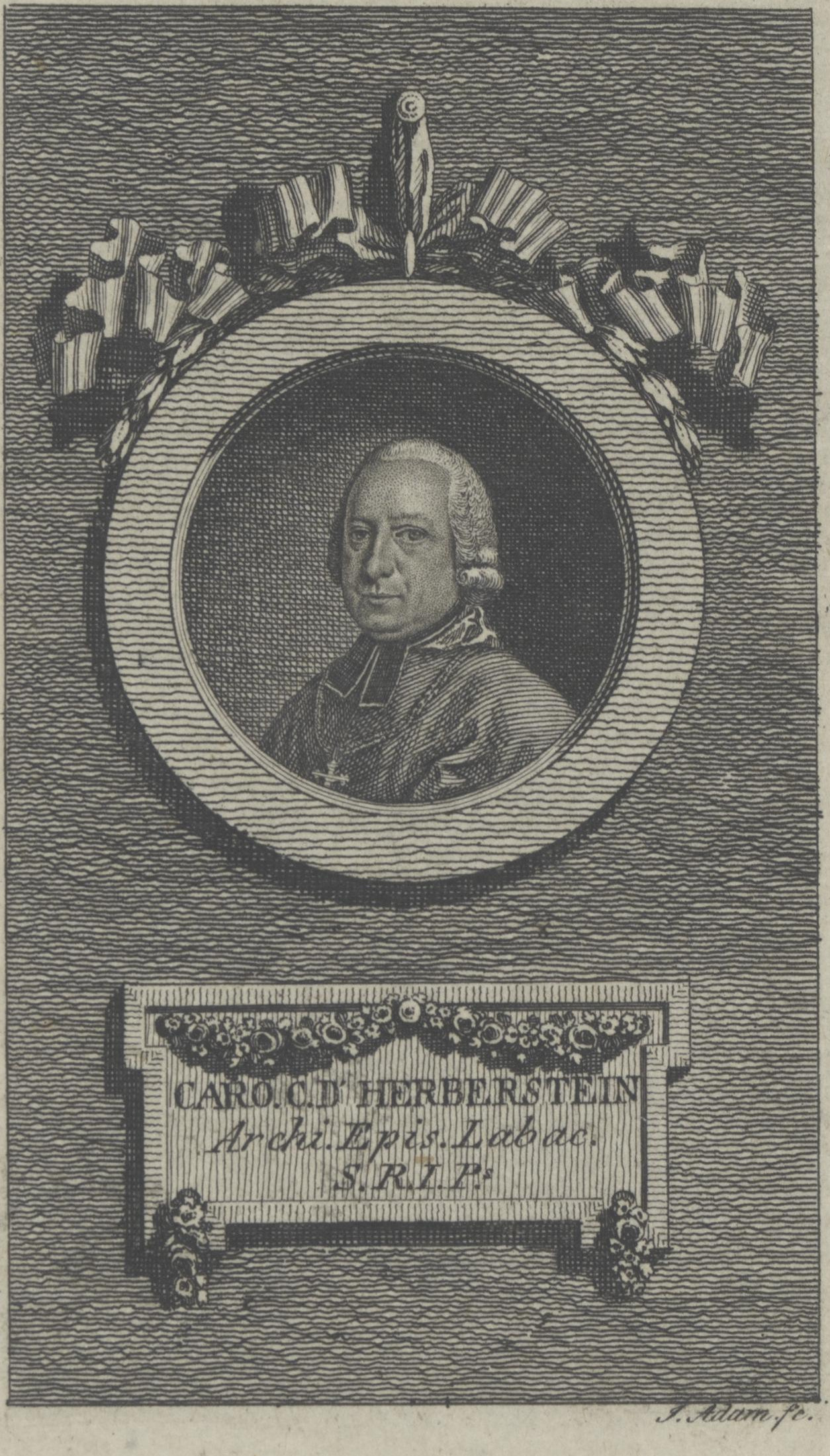
- Diocese: Ljubljana
- Installed: 1772
- Term ended: 1787
- Predecessor: Leopold Josef von Petazzi
- Successor: Michael Leopold Brigido

Orders
- Ordination: 1743

Personal details
- Born: July 7, 1719 Graz, Austria
- Died: October 7, 1787 (aged 68) Ljubljana, Slovenia

Johann Karl von Herberstein (Slovenized: Karel Janez Herberstein, July 7, 1719 – October 7, 1787) was a bishop of Ljubljana.

== Life ==
Johann Karl von Herberstein's parents were the Styrian governor Johann Ernst von Herberstein (1671–1746) and Maria Dorothea, daughter of Count Franz Adam von Dietrichstein and Rosa Theresia von Trauttmansdorff. Johann Karl studied theology at the University of Salzburg. On June 8, 1743, he was ordained a priest in Salzburg and received a canon's position in Trent. On November 20, 1769 he was appointed coadjutor of Ljubljana Bishop Leopold Josef von Petazzi and at the same time auxiliary bishop in Ljubljana and titular bishop of Myndus. His episcopal ordination took place in 1770 by Bishop Petazzi.

After Bishop Petazzi's death in 1772, Karl Johann von Herberstein became his successor as bishop of Ljubljana. His induction into the office took place on December 5, 1772.

During his term, he supported Emperor Josef II's church policy reforms. He advocated the diocesan regulation of Inner Austria, which sought to take into account the geographic conditions and population policy of the territory. He visited the rural parishes and supported the cultural and spiritual needs of ethnic minorities. He arranged for translations of religious literature into Slovene in Carniola and called for tolerance in religious matters. In 1782 he authored a pastoral letter in which he clearly addressed the issues and conflicts between the state and the Church.

For years, Pope Pius VI had opposed Emperor Joseph II's request to elevate Ljubljana to an archbishopric and to thus elevate Johann Karl von Herberstein to archbishop. The pope rejected the Josephinian reforms and disapproved of the attitude of the bishop, who was a proponent of the reforms. The negotiations between the court in Vienna and the curia dragged on for years. Herberstein died in 1787, and he bequeathed his fortune to the normal school and the institute for the poor.
