= Leslie D. Zettergren =

American biomedical researcher (born 1943)

- Title: Professor

Academic background
- Education: Southern Illinois University (BS); Tulane University (PhD)

Academic work
- Discipline: Biomedicine
- Sub-discipline: Immunology, Amphibians, Birds

Leslie D. Zettergren is an American biomedical researcher. He was born in 1943.

== Career ==
He received a BS degree from Southern Illinois University and a PhD in Cell and Molecular Biology from Tulane University.

He was a faculty member at Carroll University in Waukesha, Wisconsin.

His research is focused on understanding the development of the amphibian and avian immune systems.
