= Leslie, Aberdeenshire =

Village in Aberdeenshire, Scotland

Coordinates: 57.309243°N 2.692167°W

Leslie
- Cottage Retreat

- Location within Aberdeenshire
- OS grid reference: NJ584245
- Civil parish: Leslie
- Council area: Aberdeenshire
- Lieutenancy area: Aberdeenshire
- Country: Scotland
- Sovereign state: United Kingdom
- Post town: INSCH
- Postcode district: AB52
- Dialling code: 01464
- Police: Scotland
- Fire: Scottish
- Ambulance: Scottish
- UK Parliament: Gordon and Buchan
- Scottish Parliament: Aberdeenshire West

Leslie is a village and civil parish in Aberdeenshire, Scotland. It lies 4 miles (6 km) southwest of Insch, adjacent to Auchleven. The Gadie Burn, a stream, runs through the settlement.

== History ==
The village of Leslie was historically associated with Clan Leslie whose seat stood on the site of Leslie Castle. The village gave its name to both the clan and the surname Leslie.
