= Frank Leslie (Medal of Honor) =

American Civil War soldier

- Born: 1841; London, England
- Died: August 1, 1882 (aged 40–41); Minneapolis, Kansas, US
- Military career
- Allegiance: United States of America; Union
- Branch: United States Army; Union Army
- Service years: 1862–65
- Rank: Corporal
- Units: (New York (state)) Company B, 4th Regiment New York Volunteer Cavalry
- Conflicts: American Civil War
- Awards: Medal of Honor

Frank Leslie (1841 – August 1, 1882) was a private in the Union Army and a Medal of Honor recipient for his actions in the American Civil War.

Leslie enlisted in the Army from New York City in December 1862, and was assigned as a corporal to the 4th New York Cavalry. He was captured at Warrenton Springs in June 1863 and paroled, and was reduced to private. Following his MOH action, he was again promoted to corporal, and transferred to the 9th New York Cavalry in February 1865. He mustered out with his regiment in July 1865.

== Medal of Honor citation ==
Rank and organization: Private, Company B, 4th New York Cavalry. Place and date: At Front Royal, Va., August 15, 1864. Entered service at: ------. Birth: England. Date of issue: August 26, 1864.

Citation:

Capture of colors of 3d Virginia Infantry (C.S.A.).

== See also ==
- List of American Civil War Medal of Honor recipients: G–L
