= Stanislav Lipovšek =

Slovenian Roman Catholic prelate (born 1943)

Mons. Stanislav Lipovšek
- Bishop Emeritus of Diocese of Celje
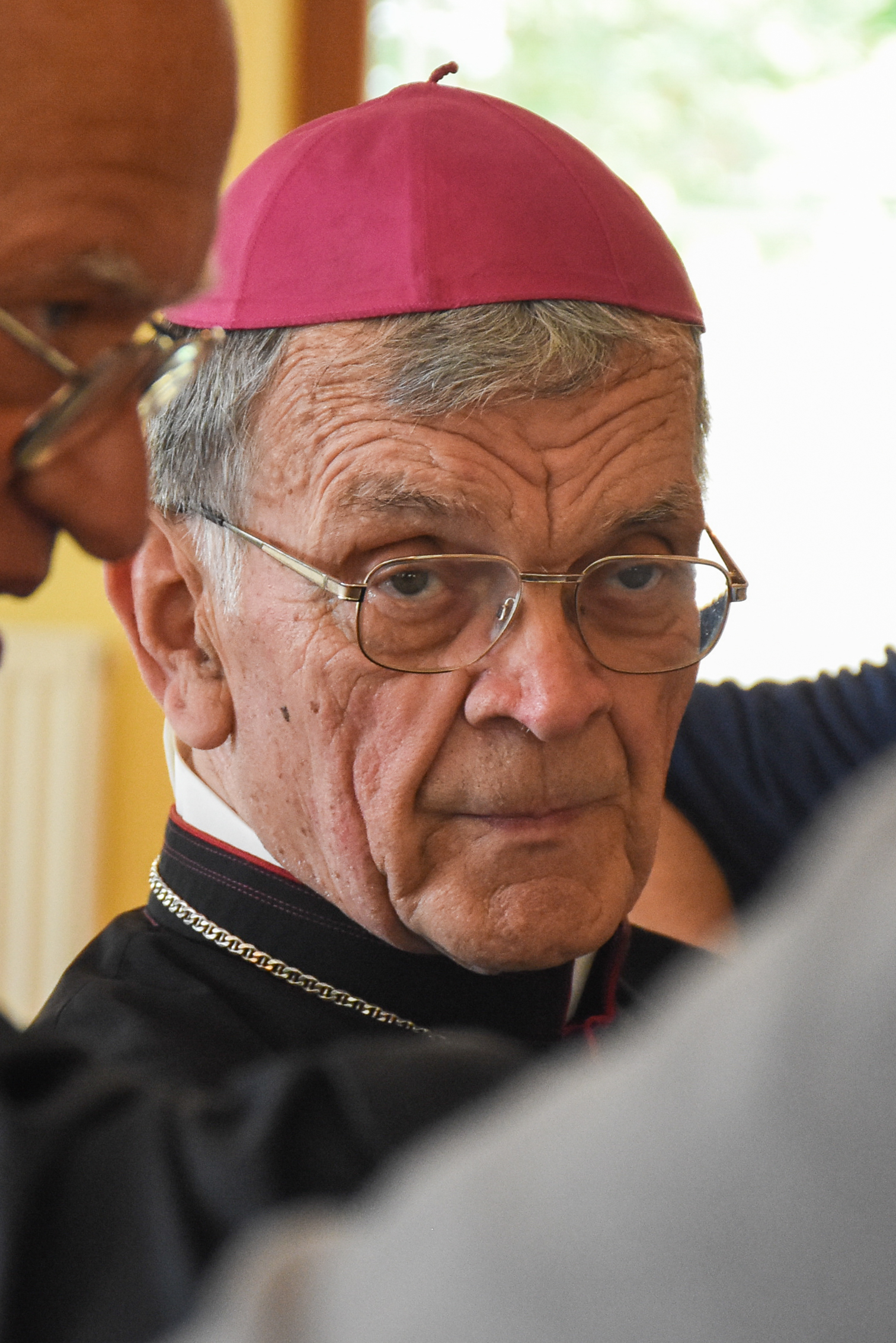
- Church: Roman Catholic Church
- Appointed: 15 March 2010
- Term ended: 18 September 2018
- Predecessor: Anton Stres
- Successor: Maksimilijan Matjaž
- Other post: Apostolic Administrator of the Archdiocese of Maribor (2013–2015)

Orders
- Ordination: 29 June 1968 (Priest)
- Consecration: 24 April 2010 (Bishop) by Santos Abril y Castelló

Personal details
- Born: Stanislav Lipovšek; 10 July 1943 (age 83) Jankova, Untersteiermark, Nazi Germany (present day Slovenia)
- Education: University of Ljubljana, Anselmianum

Bishop Stanislav Lipovšek (born 10 July 1943) is a Slovenian Roman Catholic prelate who served as the second Bishop of the Diocese of Celje from 15 March 2010 until his retirement on 18 September 2018. Also, he was an Apostolic Administrator during the vacancy of the Archdiocese of Maribor since 31 July 2013 until 26 April 2015.

== Education ==
Bishop Lipovšek was born into a Roman Catholic family in Jankova near Vojnik during time of the Nazi occupation of Slovenia in the present day Municipality of Vojnik.

After finishing primary school, which he attended in Vojnik and graduation a classical gymnasium in Celje in 1962, he was admitted to the Major Theological Seminary in Ljubljana and in the same time joined the Theological Faculty at the University of Ljubljana, where studied from 1962 until 1968 and was ordained as priest on June 29, 1968 for the Roman Catholic Diocese of Maribor, after completed his philosophical and theological studies. In the meantime, he also served his compulsory military service in the Yugoslavian Army.

Coat of arms of Bishop Stanislav Lipovšek

== Pastoral and educational work ==
After his ordination Fr. Lipovšek served as a priest in Rogaška Slatina (1968) and the parish of the St. Daniel in Celje (1968–1972). Later he continued his postgraduate studies at the Pontifical Atheneum of Saint Anselm in Rome, Italy with a Doctor of Theology degree in the camp of a liturgical science in 1976.

After returning to Slovenia, he was appointed parish administrator of the parish of the Virgin Mary in Maribor-Brezje (1976–1981). In 1981 he became a spiritual director in the Major Theological Seminary in Maribor. Then in 1982 he was appointed canon of the Cathedral of Saint John the Baptist in Maribor, where he remained until his appointment as bishop in 2010. Meanwhile, in 2004 he became vice-dean of the Maribor archdeaconry (until 2010) During his priestly service (1978–1998), he was also active as a higher education lecturer, first as an assistant and later as a part-time professor, for liturgy at the University of Maribor unit of the Faculty of Theology.

== Prelate ==
On March 15, 2010, he was appointed by Pope Benedict XVI as the second Diocesan Bishop of the Roman Catholic Diocese of Celje. On April 24, 2010, he was consecrated as bishop by Apostolic Nuncio, Archbishop Santos Abril y Castelló and other prelates of the Roman Catholic Church in the Cathedral of Saint Prophet Daniel in Celje.

Also he served as an Apostolic Administrator of the Archdiocese of Maribor during its vacancy since 31 July 2013 until 26 April 2015.

Bishop Lipovšek retired on September 18, 2018 after reaching of the age limit of 75 years old.

Catholic Church titles
Preceded by Anton Stres	Diocesan Bishop of Celje; 2010–2018	Succeeded by Maksimilijan Matjaž
Preceded by Marjan Turnšek	Apostolic Administrator of the Archdiocese of Maribor; 2013–2015	Succeeded by Alojzij Cvikl
