= Peter Štumpf =

Slovenian Roman Catholic prelate (born 1962)

Mons. Peter Štumpf, S.D.B.
- Bishop of the Diocese of Koper
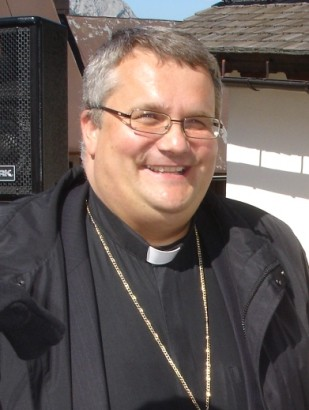
- Church: Roman Catholic Church
- Appointed: 29 November 2024
- Predecessor: Jurij Bizjak
- Successor: Incumbent
- Other post: Vice-President of the Episcopal Conference of Slovenia (2022–)
- Previous posts: Titular Bishop of Musti in Numidia and Auxiliary Bishop of Archdiocese of Maribor (2006–2009), Bishop of Murska Sobota (2009–2024)

Orders
- Ordination: 29 June 1990 (Priest) by Franc Kramberger
- Consecration: 10 September 2006 (Bishop) by Franc Kramberger

Personal details
- Born: Peter Štumpf; 28 June 1962 (age 64) Murska Sobota, FPR Yugoslavia (present day Slovenia)
- Education: University of Ljubljana, Salesian Pontifical University
- Motto: S teboj, mati Marija

Bishop Peter Štumpf, S.D.B. (born 28 June 1962) is a Slovenian Roman Catholic prelate who serves as a Bishop of the Diocese of Koper since 29 November 2024. Previously he was a Titular Bishop of Musti in Numidia and Auxiliary Bishop of the Archdiocese of Maribor from 24 May 2006 until 28 November 2009, and after, as Bishop of the Diocese of Murska Sobota since 28 November 2009 until 29 November 2024.

== Education ==
Bishop Štumpf was born into a Roman Catholic family in Murska Sobota, but grew up in Beltinci in the Prekmurje region, where his parents came from.

After finishing primary school in 1977, which he attended in Beltinci and a secondary school in Želimlje, he graduated at the classical gymnasium Poljane in Ljubljana in 1983, while joined a religious congregation of the Salesians of Don Bosco and after the novitiate made a profession on August 9, 1980. After he completed his compulsory military service in the Yugoslav Army in 1983, Peter consequently studied at the Theological faculty at the University of Ljubljana from 1984 and continued his studies at the Salesian Pontifical University in Turin, Italy from 1986 and was ordained as priest on 29 June 1990 by Bishop Franc Kramberger in Maribor, after completed his philosophical and theological studies in 1989.

Coat of arms of Bishop Peter Štumpf

== Pastoral work ==
After his ordination Fr. Štumpf was appointed as chaplain in the parish of Rakovnik in Ljubljana, where he worked until 1993, when he went to work as a chaplain in the parish of Sevnica for two years. A year later, he was appointed pastor of Ig, where he worked until 1998, and then for a year he was the parish administrator of the parish of Zabukovje nad Sevnico, and after in Maribor. There was the pastor of the parish of St. Giovanni Bosco, and in 2000 he was appointed pastor in Veržej. Since 2003 he has been the pastor of the parish of Mary Help in Rakovnik in Ljubljana. Also he served as a Dean of the deanery of Ljubljana-Vič and Rakovnik.

During this time of the pastoral work, he continued his studies at the Theological faculty of the University of Ljubljana with the master's degree in the Moral Theology in 1994 and the Doctor of Theology degree in 2002.

== Prelate ==
On 24 May 2006, he was appointed by Pope Benedict XVI as the a Titular Bishop of Musti in Numidia and Auxiliary Bishop of Archdiocese of Maribor. On 10 September 2006, he was consecrated as bishop by Metropolitan Archbishop Franc Kramberger and other prelates of the Roman Catholic Church in the Cathedral of Saint John the Baptist in Maribor.

On 28 November 2009 Bishop Štumpf was transferred to the vacant Diocese of Murska Sobota and installed as its second bishop on 10 January 2010. On 29 November 2024 he was transferred to the Diocesan See of Koper.

Catholic Church titles
Preceded by Andrej Glavan	Titular Bishop of Musti in Numidia; 2006–2009	Succeeded by Paolo Martinelli
Preceded by Marjan Turnšek	Diocesan Bishop of Murska Sobota; 2009–2024	Succeeded by Janez Kozinc
Preceded by Jurij Bizjak	Diocesan Bishop of Koper; 2024–present	Incumbent
