= Janez Kozinc =

Slovenian Roman Catholic bishop (born 1975)

The Most Reverend Janez Kozinc
- Bishop of Murska Sobota
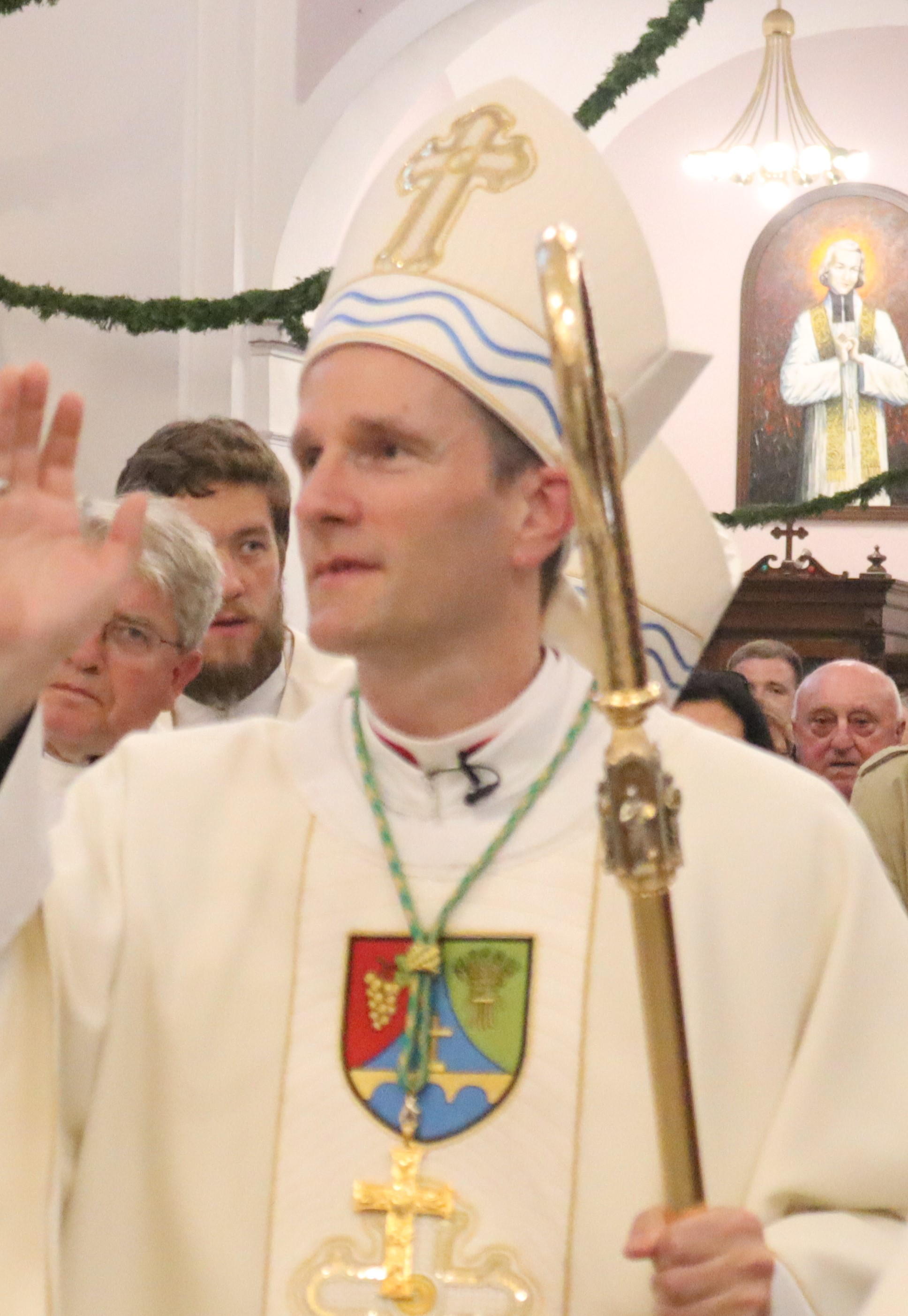
- Church: Catholic Church
- Archdiocese: Maribor
- Diocese: Murska Sobota
- Appointed: 18 June 2025
- Installed: 14 September 2025
- Predecessor: Peter Štumpf

Orders
- Ordination: 29 June 2010
- Consecration: 14 September 2025 by Peter Štumpf

Personal details
- Born: 21 August 1975 (age 51) Celje, SFR Yugoslavia
- Education: University of Ljubljana
- Motto: Kjer je gospodov duh, tam je svoboda
- Coat of arms

Janez Kozinc (born 21 August 1975) is a Slovenian Roman Catholic prelate, who has served as the bishop of the Diocese of Murska Sobota since 14 September 2025. He is the third bishop of the diocese, which forms part of the Archdiocese of Maribor within the Catholic Church in Slovenia.

== Early life and education ==
Kozinc was born on 21 August 1975 in Celje, in what was then the Socialist Republic of Slovenia of the Socialist Federal Republic of Yugoslavia.

He first pursued studies in the natural sciences. He enrolled at the Faculty of Chemistry and Chemical Technology of the University of Ljubljana, graduating in 1999. After completing civil service, he worked at the ecological research institute ERICo in Velenje. He subsequently undertook postgraduate studies in cooperation with the University of Ljubljana and earned a doctorate in analytical chemistry in 2005. His academic and professional background in the natural sciences preceded his decision to enter priestly formation.

== Priestly ministry ==
In 2006, Kozinc entered the Maribor Theological Seminary and began studies in philosophy and theology. He was ordained a deacon in 2009 and a priest for the Diocese of Celje on 29 June 2010.

Following his ordination, he carried out pastoral assignments in several parishes of the Diocese of Celje. His responsibilities included parish ministry, catechetical work, and participation in diocesan pastoral bodies. Over time, he also assumed broader responsibilities connected with clergy formation and diocesan administration.

== Episcopal ministry ==
On 18 June 2025, Pope Leo XIV appointed Kozinc as Bishop of the Diocese of Murska Sobota. He succeeded Peter Štumpf, who had been appointed Bishop of Koper.

Kozinc received episcopal consecration and took canonical possession of the diocese on 14 September 2025. As diocesan bishop, he is responsible for the pastoral governance of the faithful in northeastern Slovenia, promoting evangelization, overseeing clergy and religious life, and representing the diocese within the Slovenian Bishops' Conference.

Catholic Church titles
Preceded by Peter Štumpf	Diocesan Bishop of Murska Sobota; 2025–present	Incumbent
