= St. Andrew's Church, Sankt Andrä =

Coordinates: 46.7651°N 14.8230°E

- Sankt Andrä Cathedral
- Pfarrkirche Sankt Andrä; Dom Sankt Andrä
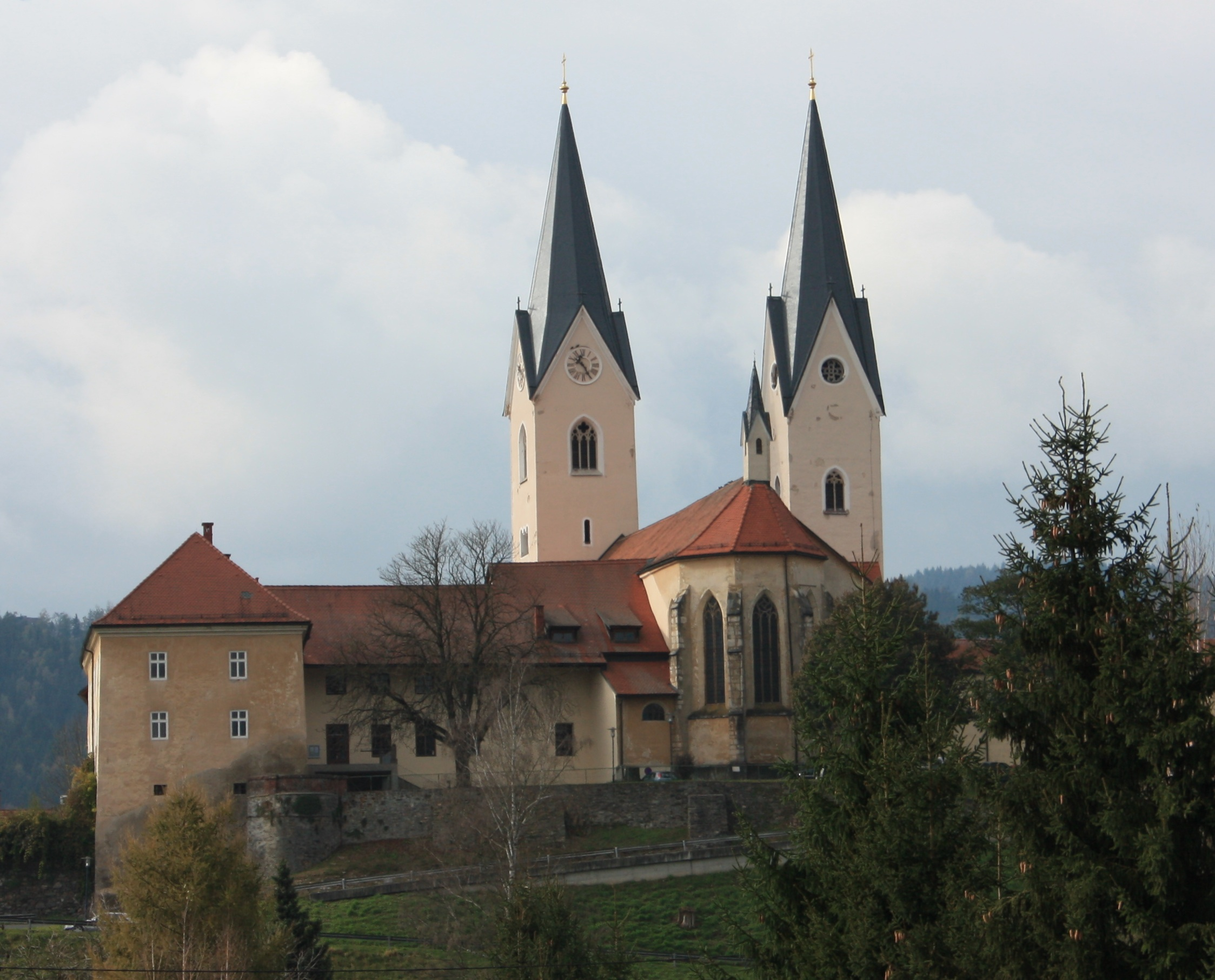
- Location: Sankt Andrä
- Country: Austria
- Denomination: Roman Catholic Church

St. Andrew's Church, Sankt Andrä im Lavanttal, formerly Sankt Andrä Cathedral (German: Dom Sankt Andrä; Pfarrkirche St. Andrä im Lavanttal) is a Roman Catholic church in Sankt Andrä im Lavanttal at the southern end of the Lavant Valley, Carinthia, Austria. For more than 600 years, between 1228 and 1859, it was the cathedral of the Diocese of Lavant.

The first mention of a parish in the Lavanttal occurs in the year 888. The first reliable mention of a church dates from 1145. In 1225 an Augustinian monastery was founded in Sankt Andrä, the church of which was declared the cathedral of the small Diocese of Lavant created in 1228. In 1859 the seat of the diocese was transferred to St. John the Baptist Church in Marburg an der Drau (the present Maribor Cathedral) without the Carinthian parishes, which were transferred to the Diocese of Gurk.

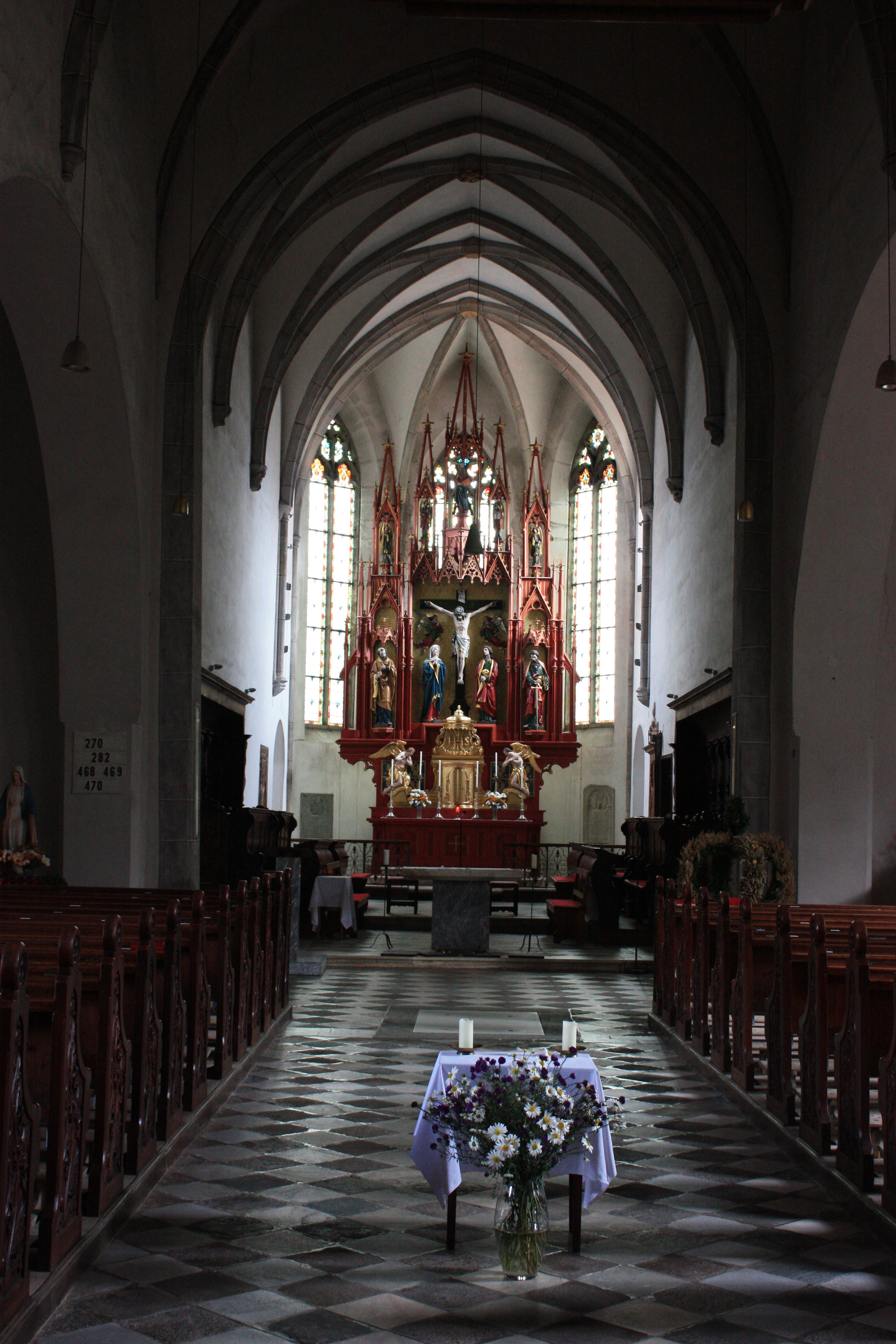
Internal view

== See also ==
- List of Jesuit sites
