= Franc Kramberger =

Slovenian Roman Catholic prelate (born 1936)

Mons. Franc Kramberger
- Archbishop Emeritus of Archdiocese of Maribor
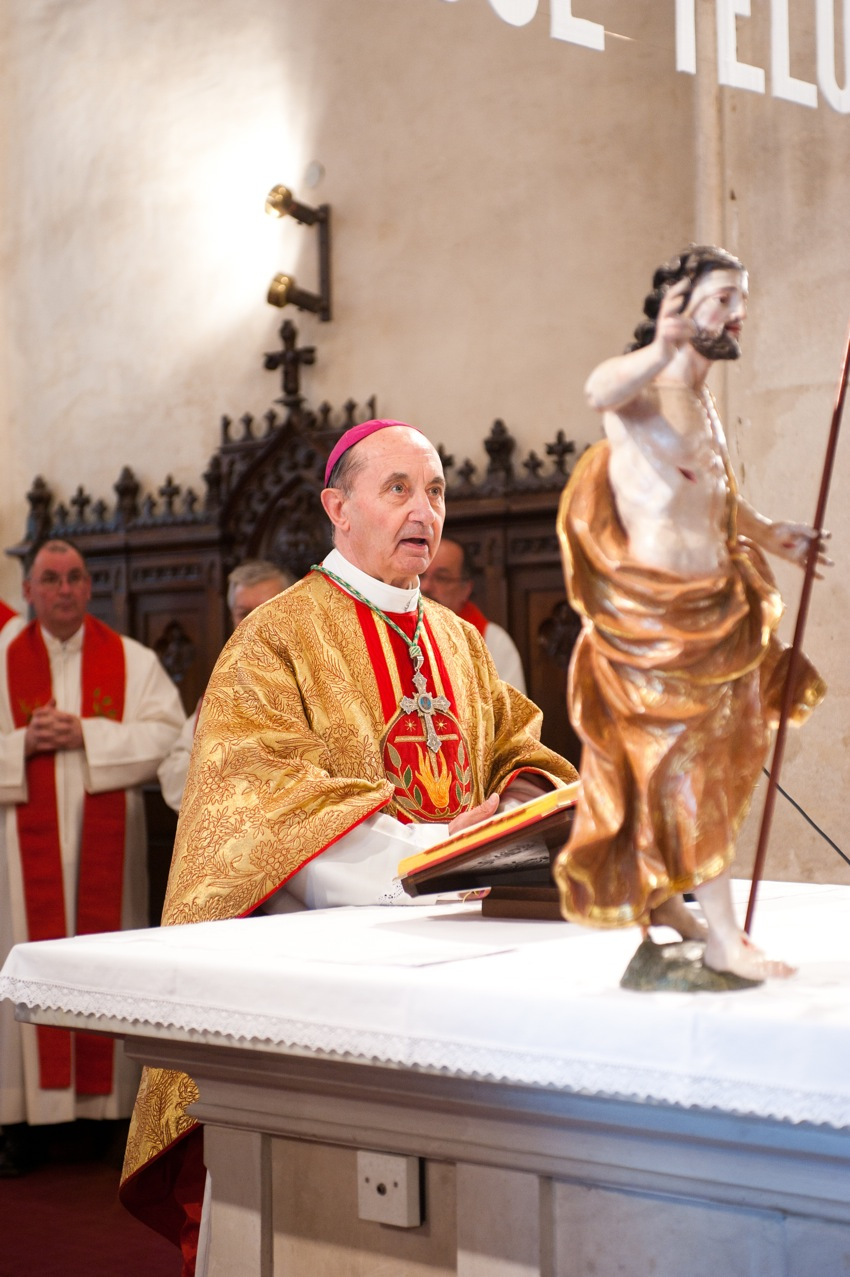
- Church: Roman Catholic Church
- Appointed: 6 November 1980 (as Diocesan Bishop); 7 April 2006 (as Archbishop)
- Term ended: 3 February 2011
- Predecessor: Maksimilijan Držečnik
- Successor: Marjan Turnšek
- Other post: President of the Episcopal Conference of Slovenia (2004–2007)

Orders
- Ordination: 29 June 1960 (Priest)
- Consecration: 21 December 1980 (Bishop) by Michele Cecchini

Personal details
- Born: Franc Kramberger; 7 October 1936 (age 90) Lenart v Slovenskih Goricah, Kingdom of Yugoslavia (present day Slovenia)
- Education: University of Ljubljana

Archbishop Franc Kramberger (born 7 October 1936) is a Slovenian Roman Catholic prelate who served as a bishop of the Diocese of Maribor from 6 November 1980 until 7 April 2006 and as an archbishop of the newly elevated Archdiocese of Maribor since 7 April 2006 until his resignation on 3 February 2011.

== Education ==
Archbishop Kramberger was born into a Roman Catholic family in the Slovene Hills in the present-day Municipality of Lenart.

After finishing primary school, which he attended in his native town and graduation a classical gymnasium #1 in Maribor in 1954, he was admitted to the Major Theological Seminary in Ljubljana and in the same time joined the Theological Faculty at the University of Ljubljana, where he studied from 1954 until 1960 and was ordained as priest on June 29, 1960 for the Roman Catholic Diocese of Lavant (as in this time was named the Diocese of Maribor), after completed his philosophical and theological studies.

Coat of arms of Archbishop Franc Kramberger

== Pastoral and educational work ==
After his ordination Fr. Kramberger served as a chaplain in the parish of the Most Holy Body in Maribor (1960–1965) and after that as a prefect in the Slomšek Minor Seminary in Maribor (1965–1972) and the Director of this educational institute (1972–1980).

In the same time he continued his postgraduate studies at the University of Ljubljana with a Doctor of Theology degree in 1973.

== Prelate ==
On November 6, 1980, he was appointed by Pope John Paul II as the Diocesan Bishop of the Roman Catholic Diocese of Maribor. On December 21, 1980, he was consecrated as bishop by Apostolic Pro-nuncio to Yugoslavia, Archbishop Michele Cecchini and other prelates of the Roman Catholic Church in the Cathedral of Saint John the Baptist in Maribor. On April 7, 2006, Pope Benedict XVI erected three new dioceses in Slovenia: in Celje, Murska Sobota and in Novo Mesto, and elevated the former diocese of Maribor to the archdiocese and metropolis status. Mons. Kramberger became the first archbishop of the newly elevated Archdiocese of Maribor.

The several terms he served as the Vice-President of the Episcopal Conference of Slovenia and from December 6, 2004 until March 16, 2007 was its President.

He resigned on February 3, 2011, citing his approaching 75 years of age as the reason for the resignation. The archdiocese was in serious financial difficulties at the time.

Catholic Church titles
Preceded by Maksimilijan Držečnik	Bishop of Maribor; 1980–2006	Succeeded by himself as Archdiocesan Archbishop
Preceded by himself as Diocesan Bishop	Archbishop of Maribor; 2006–2011	Succeeded by Marjan Turnšek
Preceded by Franc Rode	President of the Episcopal Conference of Slovenia; 2004–2007	Succeeded by Alojz Uran
