= Maksimilijan Matjaž =

Slovenian prelate of the Catholic (born 1963)

His Excellency, The Reverend Msgr. Maksimilijan Matjaž
- Bishop of the Diocese of Celje
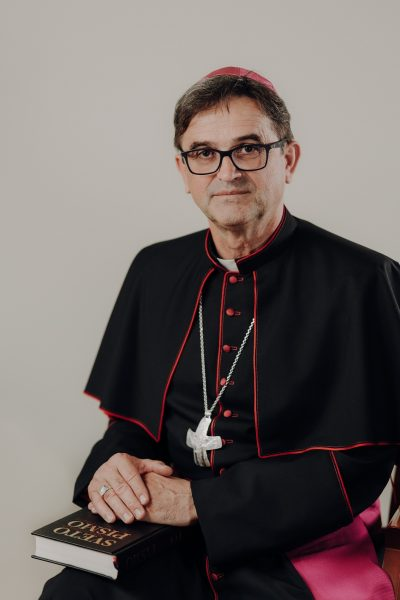
- Church: Catholic
- Diocese: Diocese of Celje
- Predecessor: Stanislav Lipovšek

Personal details
- Born: 23 August 1963 (age 63) Črna na Koroškem, Yugoslavia
- Education: University of Ljubljana; Pontifical Biblical Institute; Pontifical Gregorian University
- Motto: Oče Poveličaj Svoje Ime!
- Coat of arms: Maksimilijan Matjaž's coat of arms

Ordination history
History
Episcopal consecration
- Principal consecrator: Jean-Marie Speich
- Co-consecrators: Martin Kmetec, Stanislav Lipovšek

Maksimilijan Matjaž (born 23 August 1963) is a Slovenian prelate of the Catholic Church, serving as the third bishop of the Diocese of Celje since 5 March 2021.

== Early life and education ==
Maksimilijan Matjaž was born into a Catholic family in Črna na Koroškem in northern Slovenia (then part of Yugoslavia).

He attended primary school in Mežica, and secondary school of economics in Slovenj Gradec, where he graduated in 1982. After made a one-year of compulsory military service in the Yugoslavian Army (1982–1983), he entered to the Major Theological Seminary in Ljubljana and in the same time joined the Theological Faculty at the University of Ljubljana, where graduated in 1988 and was ordained a priest on June 29, 1989, for the Diocese of Maribor, after completed his philosophical and theological studies.

== Pastoral and educational work ==
After his ordination Fr. Matjaž was engaged in the pastoral work and served as an assistant priest in Zreče (1989–1991). In summer 1991 he continued his education in the Collegium Germanicum et Hungaricum and completed his studies with a licentiate degree in a Biblical theology in 1995 at the Pontifical Biblical Institute and with a Doctor of Theology degree in the same discipline at the Pontifical Gregorian University in 1998.

After returning to Slovenia, since 1998 he has been an assistant professor at the Faculty of Theology in the University of Ljubljana, and since 2001 a professor-assistant at the Department of Scripture and Judaism, and since 2011 an associate professor of Biblical Sciences and Judaism. Since 2013, he has been the head of the Department of Bible and Judaism at the Faculty of Theology at the University of Ljubljana.

Since 2006 he has been a member of the Priests' Council of the Metropolitan Archdiocese of Maribor and since 2011 a member of the College of Counselors. He was also an assistant priest in the parish of Dravograd (1998–2010), in Zreče (2010–2012), in the pastoral unit Slovenj Gradec (2012–2013) and in the parish of Šentilj v Slovenskih Goricah (2013–2020).

== Prelate ==
On 5 March 2021, Matjaž was appointed by Pope Francis as the third bishop of the Diocese of Celje, succeeding retired Bishop Emeritus Stanislav Lipovšek. On 30 May 2021, Apostolic Nuncio to Slovenia consecrated Matjaž as bishop in the St. Mohorij in Fortunata Church in Gornji Grad. Archbishop Jean-Marie Speich and Bishop Emeritus Lipovšek were co-consecrators.

Catholic Church titles
Preceded by Stanislav Lipovšek	Bishop of Celje; 2021–present	Incumbent
