= Alojz Uran =

Slovenian Catholic archbishop (1945–2020)

His Excellency Alojzij Uran
- Archbishop of Ljubljana
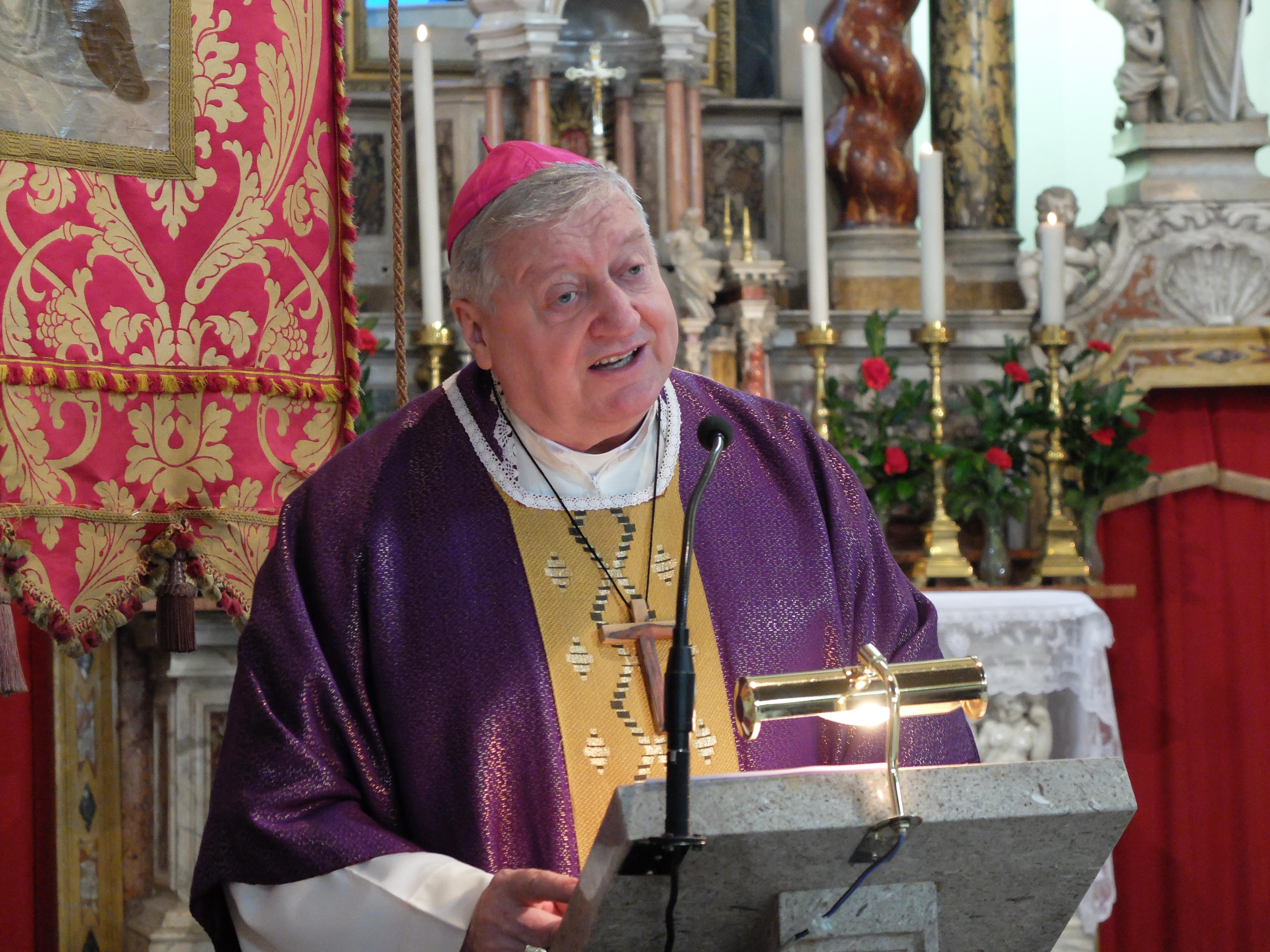
- Church: Roman Catholic
- Archdiocese: Ljubljana
- Appointed: 25 October 2004
- In office: 2004-2009
- Predecessor: Franc Rode
- Successor: Anton Stres
- Previous post: Auxiliary Bishop of Ljubljana (1992-2004)

Orders
- Ordination: 29 June 1970
- Consecration: 6 January 1993 by John Paul II
- Rank: Metropolitan Archbishop

Personal details
- Born: January 22, 1945 Ljubljana, Yugoslavia (Present day Slovenia)
- Died: April 11, 2020 (aged 75) Ljubljana, Slovenia
- Coat of arms

Alojz Uran or Alojzij Uran (22 January 1945 – 11 April 2020) was a Slovenian prelate of the Roman Catholic Church, who served as Archbishop of Ljubljana, the capital of Slovenia, from 4 December 2004 till 28 November 2009, when he resigned due to health problems. Appointed to succeed him was the coadjutor archbishop of Maribor, Anton Stres, C.M.

== Life ==
Born in Ljubljana, Alojz Uran was ordained to the priesthood on 29 June 1970, at the age of 25.

On 16 December 1992, Uran was appointed Auxiliary Bishop of Ljubljana and Titular Bishop of Abula. He received his episcopal consecration on 6 January 1993 from Pope John Paul II, with Archbishops Giovanni Battista Re and Justin Rigali serving as co-consecrators.

Uran was later named Archbishop of Ljubljana on 25 October 2004. He succeeded Archbishop Franc Rodé, CM, who became Prefect of the Congregation for Institutes of Consecrated Life and Societies of Apostolic Life. His installation took place on the following 4 December.

Uran resigned in November 2009 due to health issues. In early 2020, he underwent two cardiac surgeries and had pulmonary embolism. He died on 11 April 2020 and was buried in Ljubljana Cathedral.

Catholic Church titles
Preceded by Franc Rode	Archbishop of Ljubljana; 2004–2009	Succeeded by Anton Stres
Preceded by Franc Kramberger	President of the Slovenian Bishops' Conference; 2007–2009	Succeeded by Anton Stres
