= Marjan Turnšek =

Slovenian Roman Catholic prelate (born 1955)

The Most Reverend Monsignor Marjan Turnšek
- Archbishop Emeritus of Archdiocese of Maribor
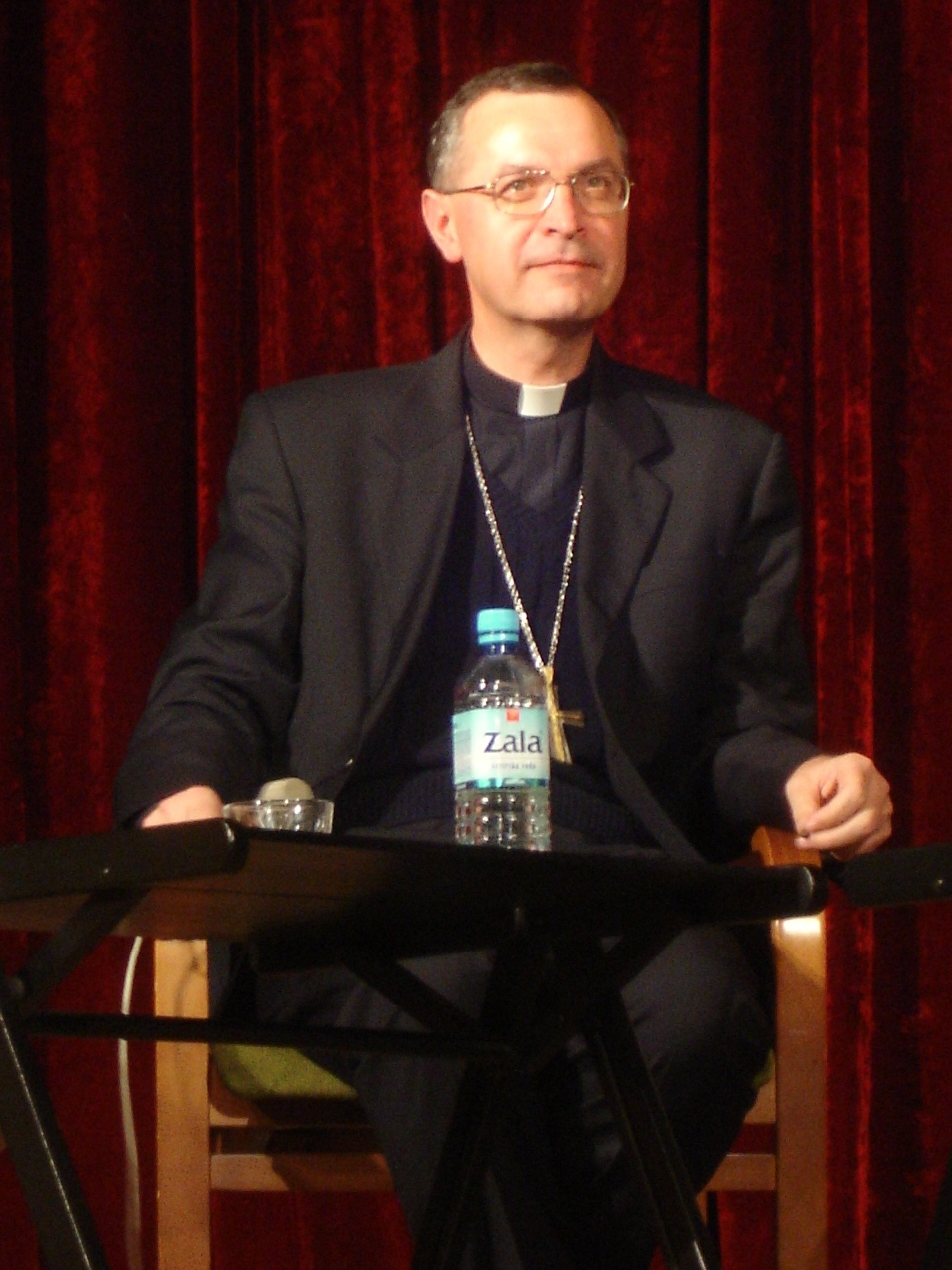
- Church: Roman Catholic Church
- Appointed: 3 February 2011
- Term ended: 31 July 2013
- Predecessor: Franc Kramberger
- Successor: Stanislav Lipovšek (as Apostolic Administrator)
- Other posts: Bishop of Murska Sobota (2006–2009), Coadjutor Archbishop of Maribor (2009–2011)

Orders
- Ordination: 28 June 1981 (Priest) by Franc Kramberger
- Consecration: 25 June 2006 (Bishop) by Franc Kramberger

Personal details
- Born: Marjan Turnšek; 25 July 1955 (age 71) Celje, FPR Yugoslavia (present day Slovenia)
- Education: University of Ljubljana, Pontifical Gregorian University

Marjan Turnšek (born 25 July 1955) is a Slovenian Roman Catholic prelate who served as the first bishop of the newly created Diocese of Murska Sobota from 7 April 2006 until 28 November 2009, coadjutor archbishop of Archdiocese of Maribor from 28 November 2009 until 3 February 2011 and as an archbishop of the same archdiocese since 3 February 2011 until his resignation on 31 July 2013.

== Education ==
Turnšek was born into a Roman Catholic family in a regional center of the traditional Slovenian region of Styria.

After finishing primary school and graduation a classical gymnasium in his native city Celje in 1974, he was admitted to the Major Theological Seminary in Ljubljana and in the same time joined the Theological Faculty at the University of Ljubljana, where studied from 1974 until 1981 and was ordained as priest on June 28, 1981 for the Roman Catholic Diocese of Maribor by Bishop Franc Kramberger, after completed his philosophical and theological studies.

Coat of arms of Archbishop Marjan Turnšek

== Pastoral and educational work ==
After his ordination Fr. Turnšek served as an assistant priest in the parish of St. Martin in Velenje (1981–1985) and after that he continued his postgraduate studies at the Pontifical Gregorian University in Rome, Italy with a master's degree in 1987 and a Doctor of Theology degree in 1990. During this time he also graduated in a Library science at the Vatican Apostolic Library.

From 1990 he worked as a research associate at the Congregation for the Causes of Saints, and since 1993 he has been a member of the European Society for Catholic Theology and was also a member of the secretariat of the Synod (plenary assembly) at the Episcopal Conference of Slovenia (1997–2001). In 1994 he was appointed the Rector of the Major Theological Seminary in Maribor, and in 1999 a canon of the Cathedral of Saint John the Baptist in Maribor. From 1990 to 2010 he taught regular and elective lectures, exercises and seminars in the field of systematic (dogmatic) theology at the Faculty of Theology, University of Ljubljana at the unit in Maribor and Ljubljana.

== Prelate ==
On April 7, 2006, he was appointed by Pope Benedict XVI as the diocesan bishop of the newly erected Roman Catholic Diocese of Murska Sobota. On June 25, 2006, he was consecrated as bishop by Metropolitan Archbishop Franc Kramberger and other prelates of the Roman Catholic Church in the Cathedral of Saint John the Baptist in Maribor. On November 28, 2009 he was transferred to the Archdiocese of Maribor as its coadjutor archbishop, and on February 3, 2011 Mons. Turnšek succeeded his predecessor as an archbishop.

He resigned on July 31, 2013 before reaching of the age limit of 75 years old, due to his partial responsibility for the financial crisis of the archdiocese, and continued to teach at the Faculty of Theology of the University of Ljubljana.

Catholic Church titles
New title	Diocesan Bishop of Murska Sobota; 2006–2009	Succeeded by Peter Štumpf
Preceded by Anton Stres	Coadjutor Archbishop of Maribor; 2009–2011	Succeeded by none
Preceded by Franc Kramberger	Archbishop of Maribor; 2011–2013	Succeeded by Stanislav Lipovšek (as Apostolic Administrator)
