= Felicianus of Musti =

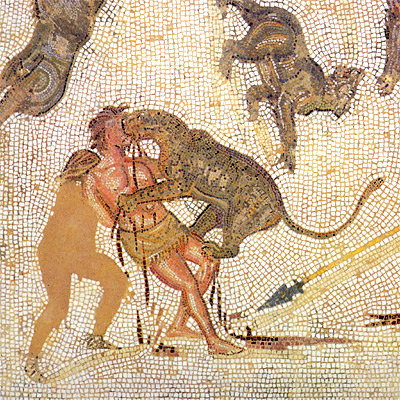
A Donatist punishment

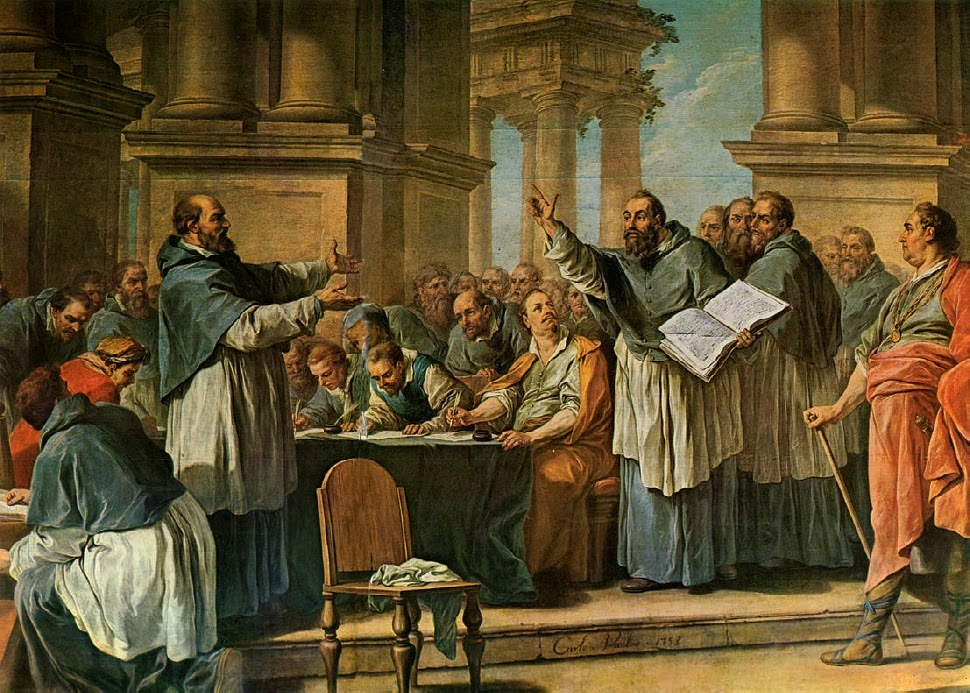
St. Augustine arguing with Donatists

Felicianus of Musti (also known as Felician or Felixianus) was a bishop of Musti in Numidia, Roman North Africa, involved in the Donatist controversy of the 4th century. He is known to history through the writings of Augustine of Hippo Regius.

== Biography ==
Felicianus was a member of the Donatists, an excommunicated movement which was critical of the Roman Catholic Church following the effects of the edict of Milan, when Christianity was becoming closely aligned with the Roman government. Felicianus joined and became a leader within a breakaway group of Donatists called the Maximianists, who took a more puritanic line than the Donatists.

According to some Catholic sources, the Donatists tried unsuccessfully to remove Felicianus from his see, and then used the imperial law courts to compel him to return. Whether this is true or Felicianus was just uncomfortable with the extremism of Maximianist theology is unknown, but Felicianus and another Maximianist leader, Praetextatus of Assur, did return to the Donatist party with their respective congregations. None were re-baptised, which was claimed by their opponents as hypocrisy.

Re-baptism of the lapsed was a core belief of the Donatists. Augustine wrote a strenuous condemnation of Felicianus of Musti in one of his letters and singled out Felicianus as an example of inconsistency in the Donatist movement. The return of Felicianus was a pivotal moment in the demise of the Maximianist movement and the return of many congregations to the Donatists. It was also one of three components to Augustine's attack on the Donatists.
