= Diocese of Murska Sobota =

Roman Catholic diocese in Slovenia

Coordinates: 46°39′28.14″N 16°10′12.30″E

Diocese of Murska Sobota Dioecesis Sobotensis Škofija Murska Sobota

Catholic
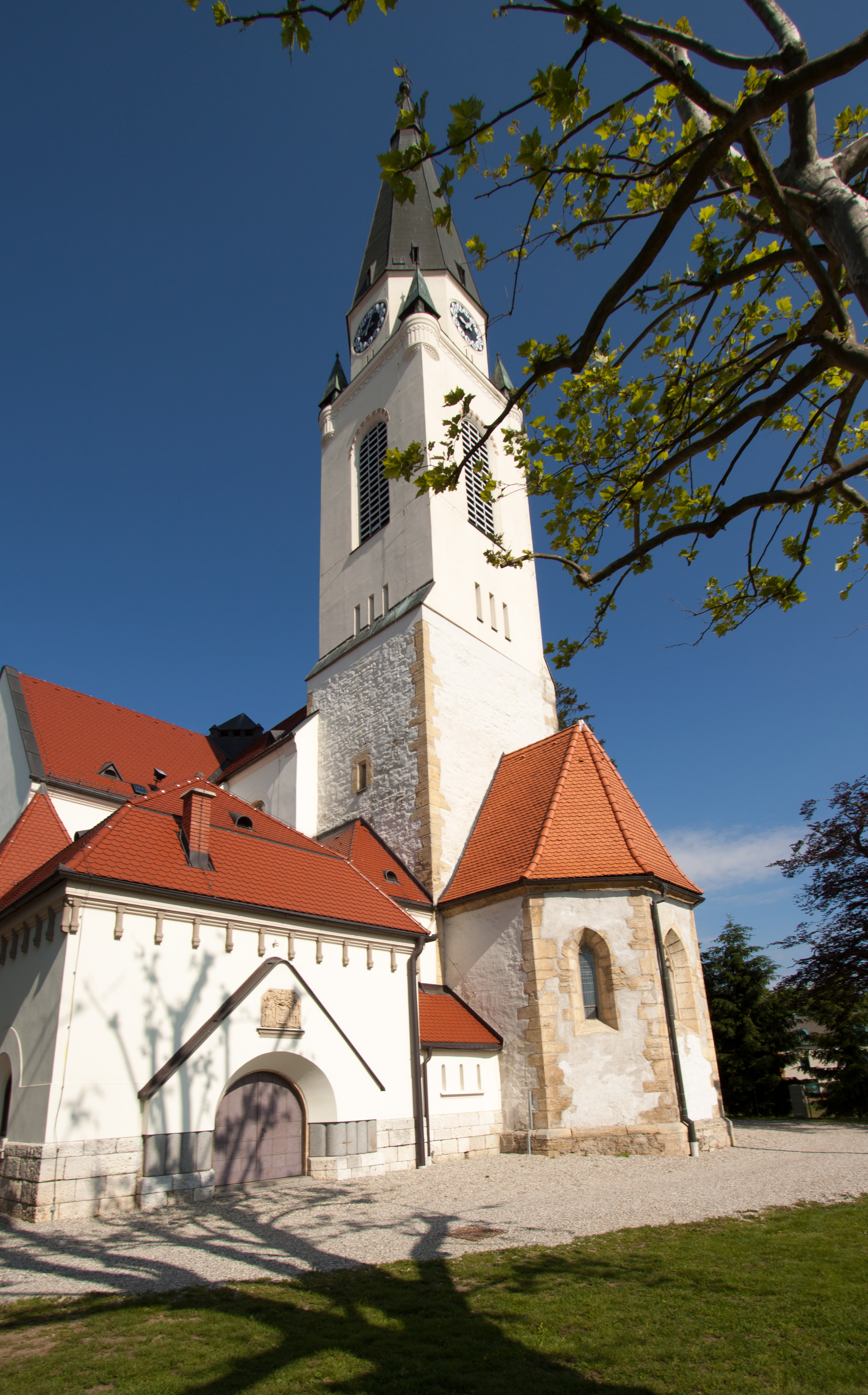
- Murska Sobota Cathedral

Location
- Country: Slovenia
- Metropolitan: Maribor

Statistics
- Area: 8,712 km^{2} (3,364 sq mi)
- Population: Total; Catholics: (as of 2012); 119,600; 95,400 (79.8%)

Information
- Rite: Latin Rite
- Established: 7 April 2006
- Cathedral: Murska Sobota Cathedral

Current leadership
- Pope: Leo XIV
- Bishop: Janez Kozinc

The Diocese of Murska Sobota (Latin: Dioecesis Sobotensis; Slovene: Škofija Murska Sobota) is a Latin Church diocese of the Catholic Church located in the city of Murska Sobota in the ecclesiastical province of Maribor in Slovenia.

== History ==
- April 7, 2006: Established as Diocese of Murska Sobota from the Diocese of Maribor

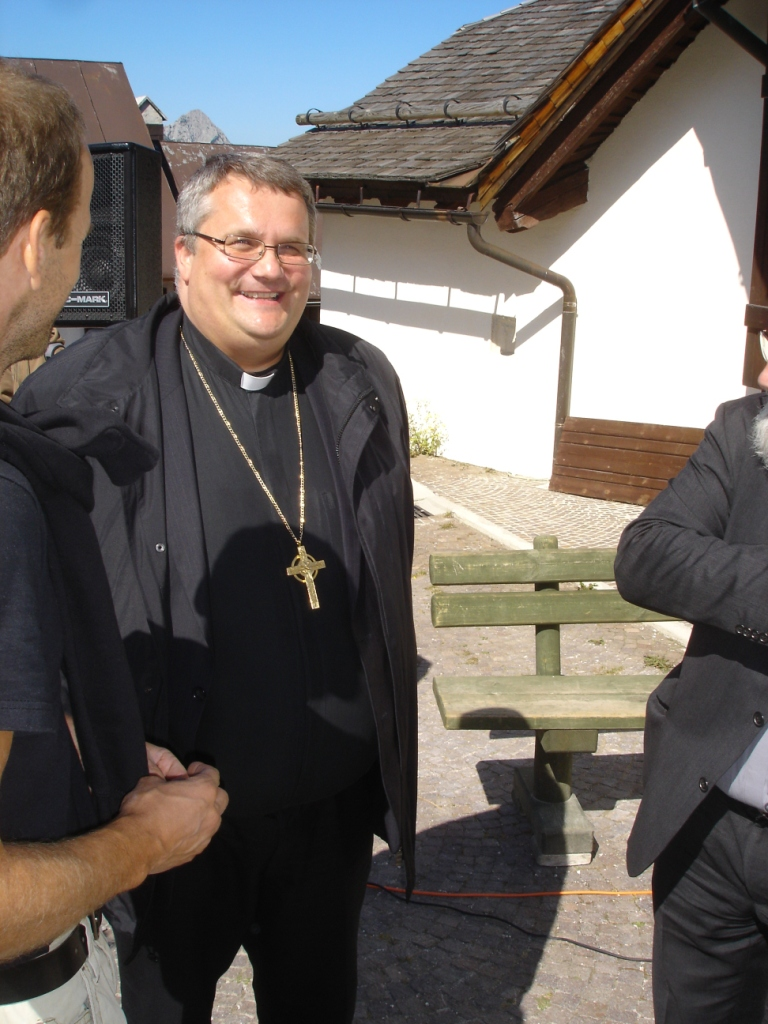
Bishop Peter Štumpf

== Leadership ==
Bishops of Murska Sobota

- Marjan Turnšek (7 April 2006 - 28 November 2009); appointed Coadjutor Archbishop of the Roman Catholic Archdiocese of Maribor
- Peter Štumpf, S.D.B. (28 November 2009 – 1 February 2025)
- Janez Kozinc (since 18 June 2025)

== See also ==
- Roman Catholicism in Slovenia
