= Murska Sobota Cathedral =

Cathedral in Murska Sobota, Slovenia

Coordinates: 46.6578°N 16.1701°E

- Stolna cerkev sv. Nikolaja
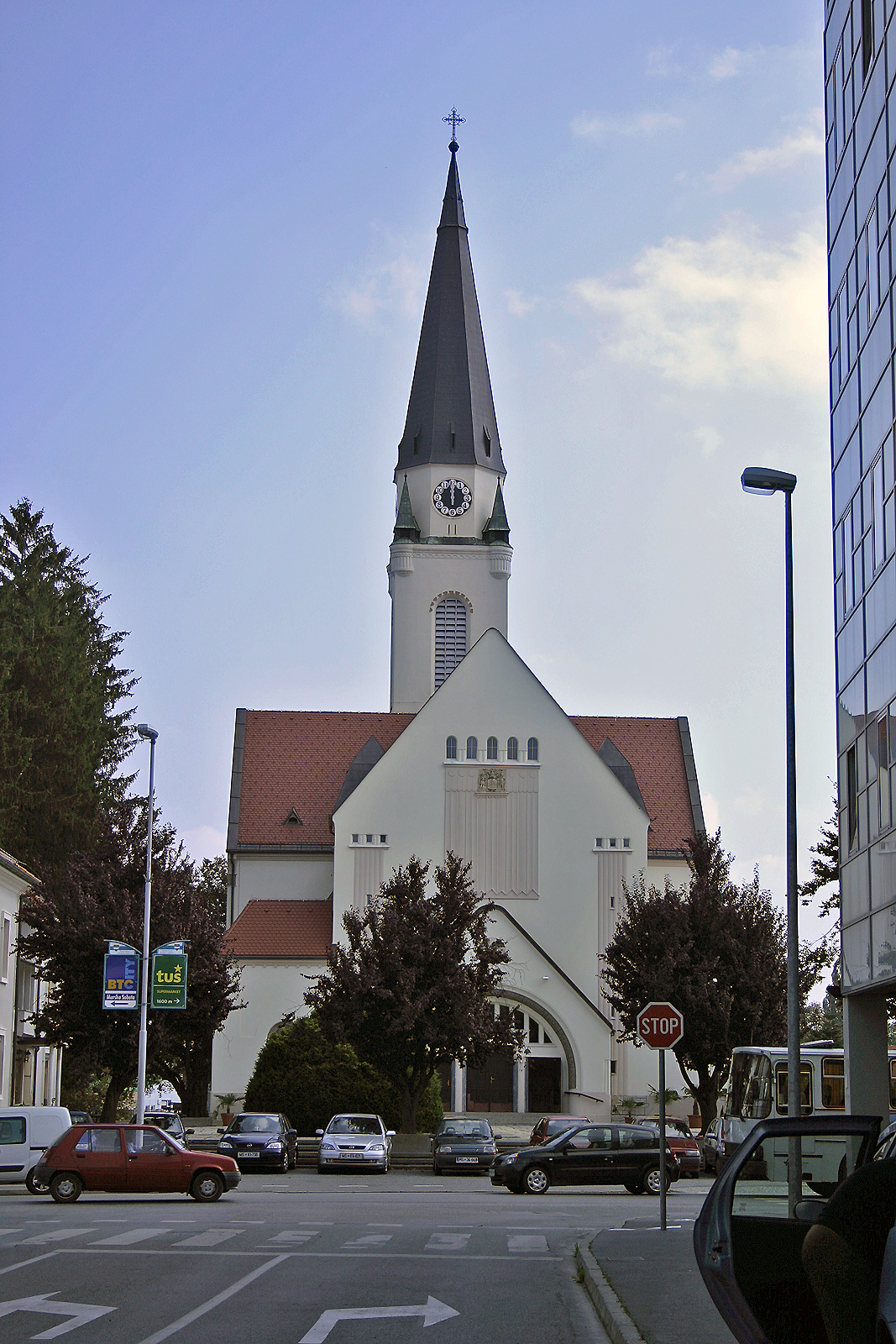

Religion
- Affiliation: Catholic Church
- Rite: Roman
- Patron: Saint Nicholas
- Status: active

Location
- Country: Slovenia
- Interactive map of Murska Sobota Cathedral

Architecture
- Style: Neo-Romanesque
- Completed: 1912; 114 years ago

Murska Sobota Cathedral (Slovene: Stolna cerkev sv. Nikolaja) is a Roman Catholic cathedral dedicated to Saint Nicholas in the town of Murska Sobota, Slovenia. It has been the episcopal seat of the diocese of Murska Sobota since the diocese was created in 2006.

The site was originally occupied by Roman temples. The first church here was built of wood from 1071, shortly after the Hungarians who had settled here converted to Christianity. Murska Sobota developed into a religious centre during the Middle Ages.

The mediaeval second cathedral of 1350 was replaced in 1912 by the present Neo-Romanesque building, which includes some decorative elements of the Jugendstil. Reinforced concrete was used in the construction.

The four bells from the old cathedral were re-hung in the new belfry. In 1992 a new organ was installed, which, with 37 registers, is one of the biggest in the country.
