= Hermann of Cilli =

Bishop of Freising from 1412 to 1421

- Bishop of Freising
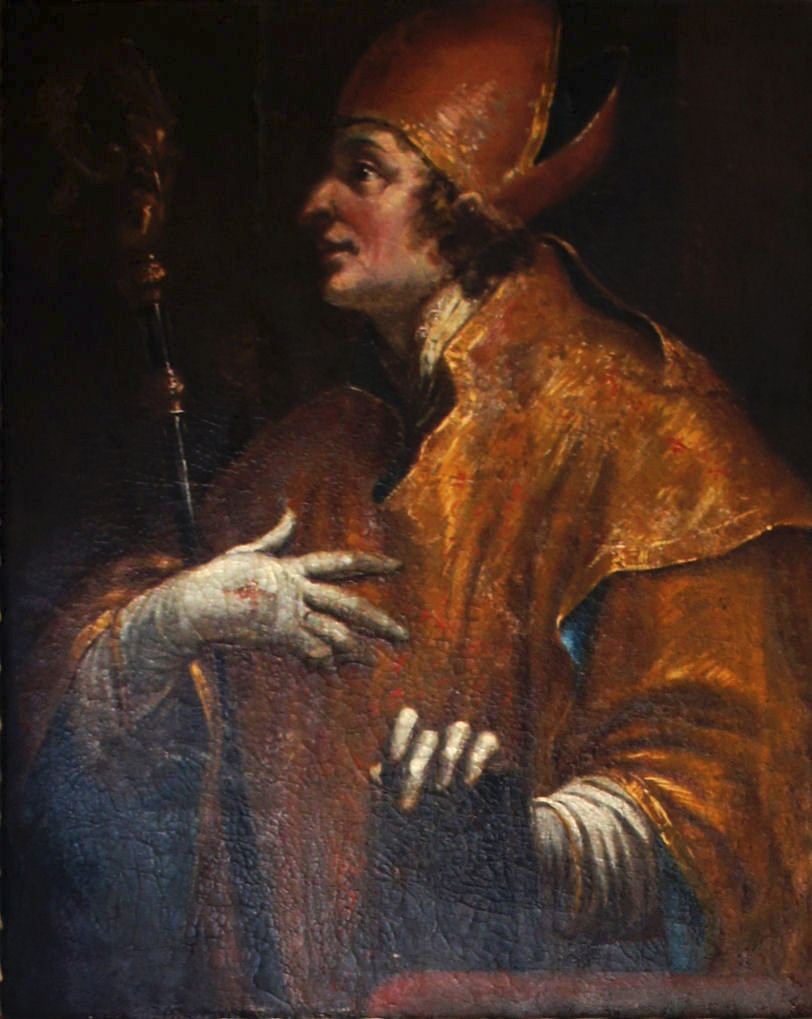
- Hermann of Cilli (painting in the Freising residence)
- Diocese: Freising
- In office: 26 July 1412 – 13 September 1421
- Predecessor: Conrad of Hebenstreit
- Successor: Nicodemus della Scala

Orders
- Consecration: 1412

Personal details
- Born: 1383 Cilli
- Died: 13 September 1421 (aged 37–38)
- Buried: Celje Cathedral
- Denomination: Roman Catholic

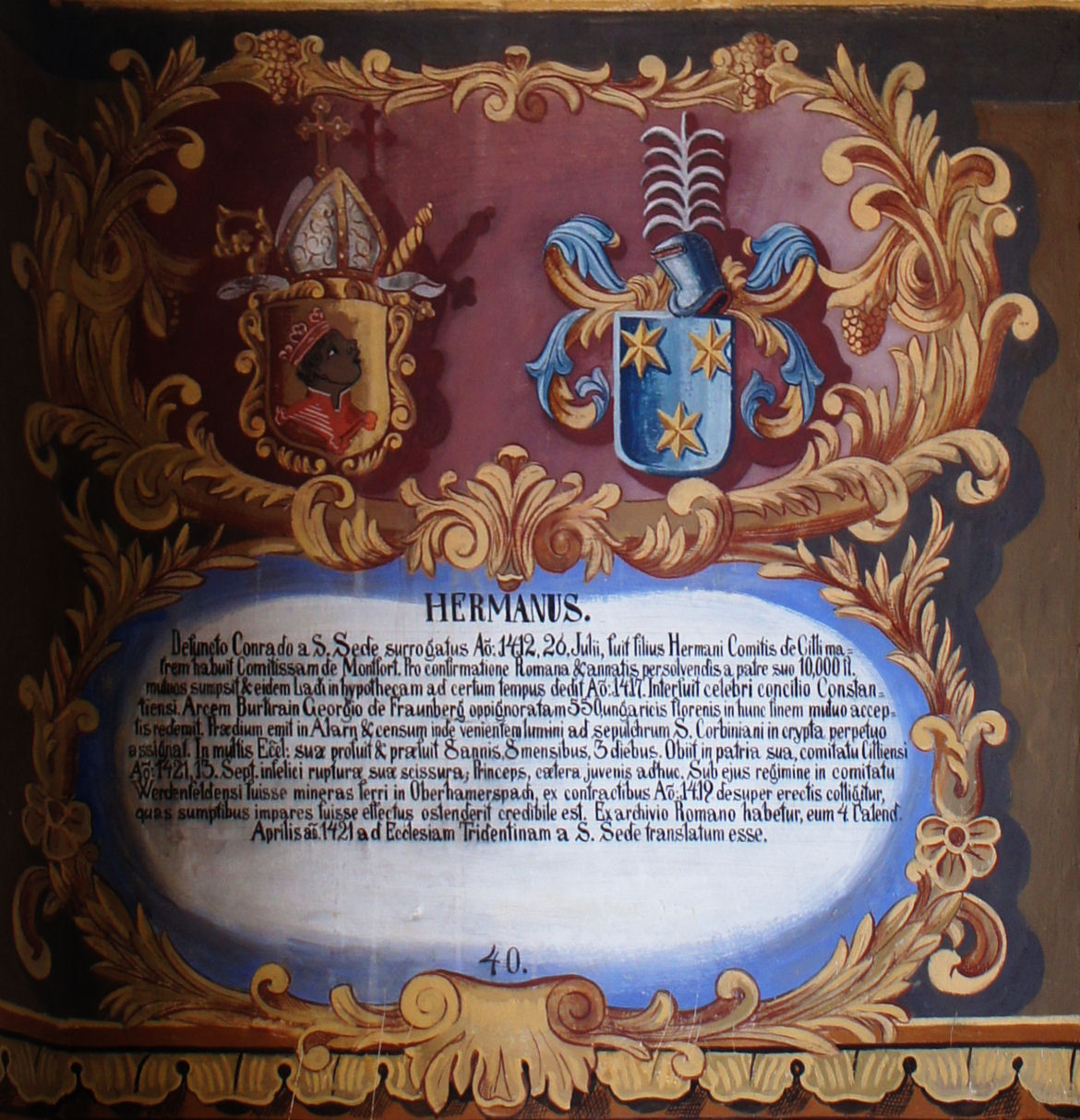
Table of arms of Hermann of Cilli (Freising residence)

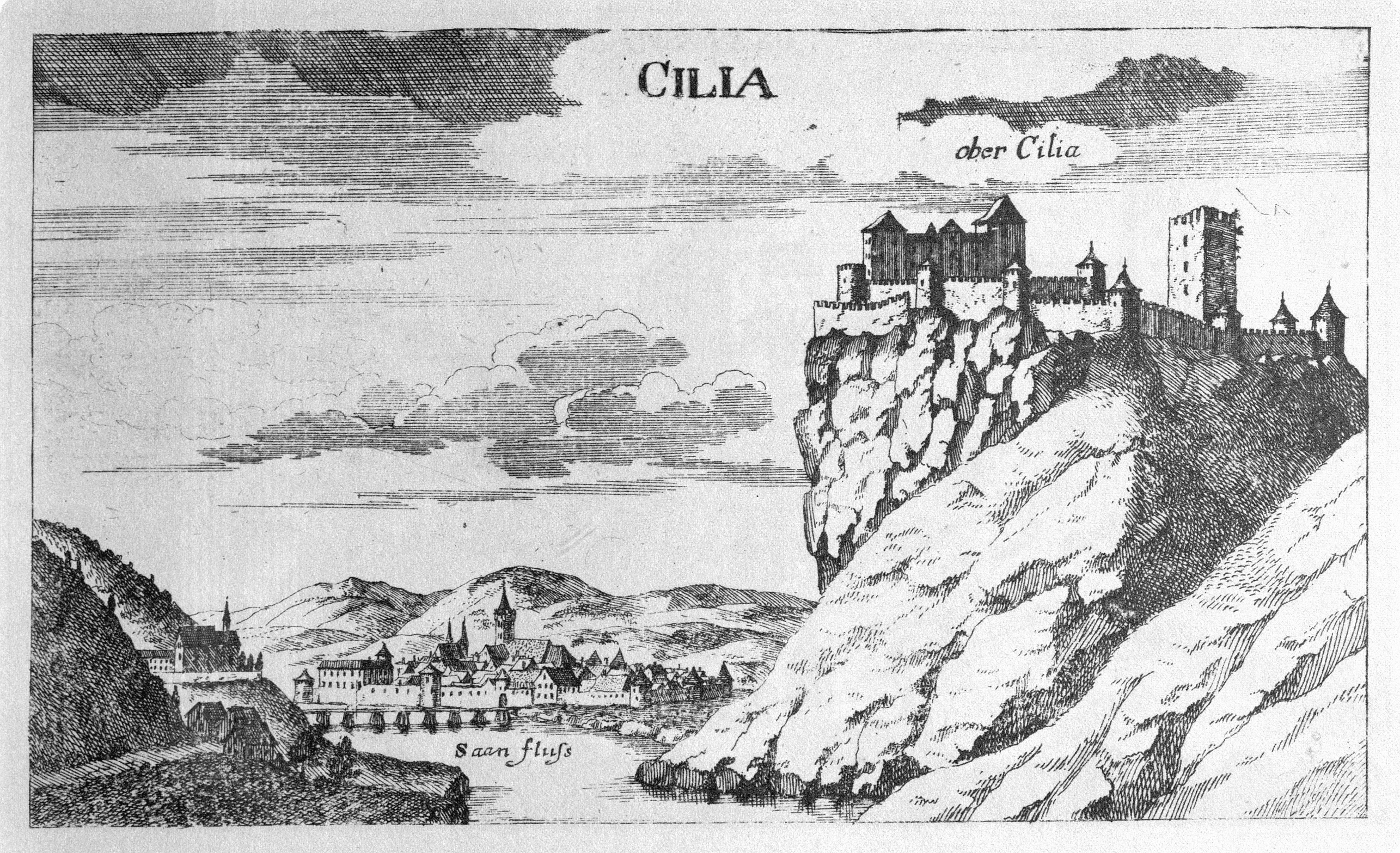
Burg Obercilli 1681

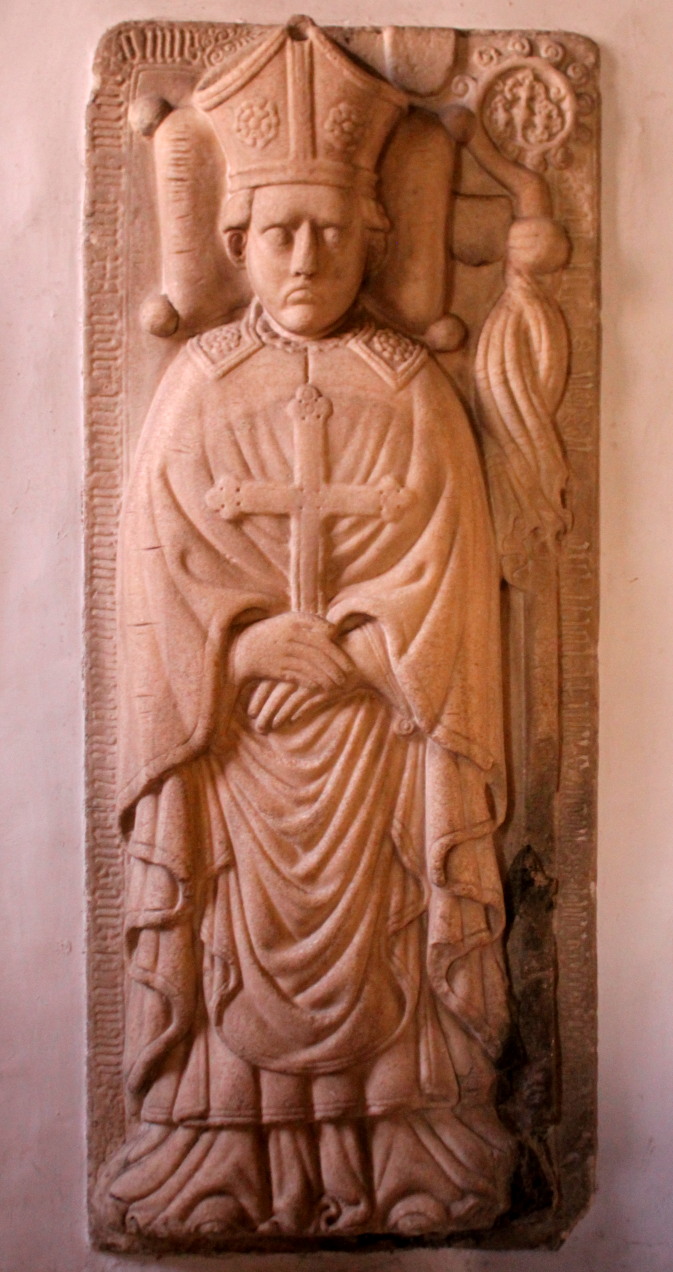
Tomb of the Freising Prince Bishop Hermann von Cilli (1383–1421) in the Cathedral of Saint Daniel in Celje (German name: Cilli).

Hermann of Cilli (1383 – 13 September 1421), also known as Armand de Cilli, or Herniosus mit dem Bruche ("Herniosus with the hernia"), was born in Cilli, the illegitimate son, although later legitimated, of Count Hermann II of Celje, of the family of the Counts of Cilli and Sanneck, whose family seat was in Celje Castle (Burg Obercilli, now in Slovenia).

King Sigismund was betrothed in 1409 to Barbara of Cilli, the youngest daughter of Count Hermann II, who had saved the king's life at the Battle of Nikopolis. The Count became one of Sigismund's most powerful advisers, and it was easy for him to obtain the bishopric of Freising for his son Hermann when it suddenly fell vacant.

At this time Hermann was studying in Bologna, when on 26 July 1412 Pope John XXII, on the intervention of the German emperor Sigismund, named him Bishop of Freising. As he was still too young to be consecrated a bishop, he received a papal dispensation allowing him to rule in Freising. He had to borrow 10,000 Gulden from his father to pay the annates due to the papacy. On 8 September 1413, he was anointed bishop. The cathedral chapter of Freising was entirely taken by surprise by the sudden death of Bishop Conrad of Hebenstreit and the equally sudden nomination of Hermann, which prevented it from exercising its right of election.

From 1414 to 1418 Hermann took part in the Council of Constance, where he represented the interests of King Sigismund. In the summer of 1419, he agreed an alliance with the bishops of the ecclesiastical province of Salzburg, under the leadership of the Archbishop of Salzburg, for the protection of their spiritual Immunitätsrechte with the promise of mutual support against the territorial princes.

Because of their good relations with the king, the family was able to persuade Pope Martin V to transfer him to the seat of the Prince-Bishop of Trent, vacant since the banishment of George of Lichtenstein in August 1419. The Papal nomination took place on 29 March 1421, but Martin V was oblige to rescind it on 13 September 1421, as the cathedral chapter of Trent were not willing to accept Hermann, because of his severe hernia. In order to regain Trent he returned to Cilli in late autumn and underwent an operation, which he did not survive.

He died on 13 September 1421 and was buried in the parish church of Celje, now Celje Cathedral. His monument is in the presbytery, on the Gospel side.

== Notes and references ==
Catholic Church titles
Preceded by Conrad of Hebenstreit	Bishop of Friesing; 1412 – 1421	Succeeded by Nicodemus della Scala
