= Roman Catholic Diocese of Lavant =

Former bishopric

The Diocese of Lavant (also Lavanttal, Latin: Lavantina) was a suffragan bishopric of the Archdiocese of Salzburg, established in 1228 in the Lavant Valley of Carinthia.

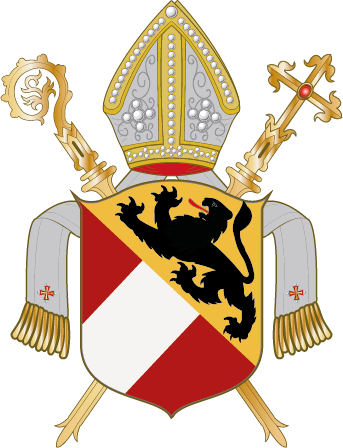
Coat of arms of the prince-bishopric Lavant

In 1859 the episcopal see was re-assigned to Maribor (Marburg an der Drau) in present-day Slovenia, while the Carinthian parishes passed to the Diocese of Gurk. The diocese became the Diocese of Maribor (Marburg, in Slovenia), separated from the Salzburg ecclesiastical province, and became a suffragan of the Archbishop of Ljubljana on 5 March 1962. The Bishop of Maribor kept the additional title of Bishop of Lavant. On 7 April 2006 the Diocese of Maribor was elevated to an archdiocese.

While the bishops of Lavant bore the title of prince-bishops (German: Fürstbischof), this was purely honorary and they never became full-fledged prince-bishops with secular power over a self-ruling prince-bishopric (Hochstift), unlike the majority of the bishops in the Holy Roman Empire. They only exercised pastoral authority over their diocese like other ordinary bishops and for that reason, they did not have seat and vote in the Imperial Diet.

== History ==
The original seat of the bishopric lay in the eastern part of Carinthia in the valley of the Lavant River. It was here, in the parish of Sankt Andrä, that Archbishop Eberhard II of Salzburg established a collegiate chapter with the consent of Pope Innocent III and Holy Roman Emperor Frederick II on 20 August 1212. Its regular canons followed the Rule of St. Augustine; its members were chosen from the cathedral chapter of Salzburg. In about the year 1223, the Archbishop of Salzburg asked Pope Honorius III to allow him to found a bishopric at Sankt Andrä on account of its great remoteness and the difficulty of travelling there. After the pope had had the archbishop's request examined by commissioners and gave his consent, Eberhard drew up the deed of foundation on 10 May 1228, wherein he secured possession of the episcopal chair for himself and his successors in perpetuity. He named as first suffragan bishop his court chaplain Ulrich (died 1257), who had previously been priest of Haus im Ennstal in the Duchy of Styria. St. Andrew's Church in Sankt Andrä became the diocese's cathedral.

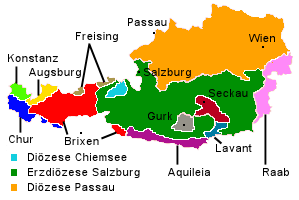
Catholic dioceses in present-day Austria about 1300

In the deed of foundation of the new bishopric, no exact boundaries were defined. In a deed of Archbishop Frederick II of Salzburg of 1280, seventeen parishes, situated partly in Carinthia and partly in Styria, were described as belonging to Lavant; the extent of the diocese was rather small, but the bishops also attended to the office of vicar-general (diocesan deputy) of the Archbishops of Salzburg for some scattered districts; they also frequently attended to the office of Vicedominus (bishop's feudal deputy in secular affairs) at Friesach.

The tenth bishop, Dietrich von Wolfsau (served 1318–1332), is mentioned in deeds as the first (honorific) prince-bishop; he was also secretary of the Habsburg duke Frederick the Handsome, and was present at the Battle of Mühldorf in 1322. Since the twenty-second bishop, Theobald Schweinbeck (served 1446–1463), the bishops bore the title of Fürst (prince).

The following prominent bishops deserve special mention: the humanist Johann I von Rott (served 1468–1482), who later became Prince-Bishop of Breslau; Georg II Agrikola (served 1570–1584), who after 1572 was simultaneously Bishop of Seckau; Georg III Stobäus von Palmburg (served 1584–1618), a significant promotor of the Counter-Reformation; and Maximilian Gandolph Freiherr von Kienburg (served 1654–1665), who did much towards increasing the financial resources of the diocese.

By new regulations under Holy Roman Emperor Joseph II, several territories were added to the Diocese of Lavant. Prince-Archbishop Michael Brigido of Laibach ceded a number of parishes to the Diocese of Lavant in 1788.

The extent of the diocese was changed by the circumscription of 1 June 1859. The valley of the Lavant and the district of Völkermarkt in Carinthia were given to the Diocese of Gurk; in consequence, the District of Marburg was transferred from Seckau to Lavant; leaving Lavant comprising the whole of southern Styria. By the decree of the Congregation of the Consistory of 20 May 1857, the see of the bishop was moved from Sankt Andrä to Marburg and the parish church, a church of St. John the Baptist, was elevated into a cathedral. On 4 September 1859, Bishop Anton Martin Slomšek (served 1846–1862) formally entered Marburg.

In 1962, the diocese was renamed to the Diocese of Maribor.

== List of bishops ==
=== Bishops based in Sankt Andrä ===
- Ulrich von Haus (1228–1257)
- Karl von Friesach (1257–1260)
- Otto von Mörnstein (1260–1264)
- Almerich Grafendorfer (1265–1267)
- Herbord (1267–1275)
- Gerhard von Ennstal (1275–1285)
- Konrad I (1285–1291)
- Heinrich von Helfenberg (1291–1299)
- Wulfing von Stubenberg (1299–1304)
- Werner (1304–1316)
- Dietrich Wolfhauer (1317–1332)
- Heinrich I Krafft (1332–1338)
- Heinrich II von Leis (1338–1342)
- Heinrich III (1342–1356)
- Peter Kröll von Reichenhall (1357–1363)
- Heinrich IV Krapff (1363–1387)
- Ortolf von Offenstetten (1387–1391)
- Augustin (1389–1391)
- Nikolaus von Unhorst (1391–1397)
- Konrad II Torer von Törlein (1397–1408)
- Ulrich II (1408–1411)
- Wolfhard von Ehrenfels (1411–1421)
- Friedrich Deys (1421–1423)
- Lorenz von Lichtenberg (1424–1432)
- Hermann von Gnas (1433–1436)
- Lorenz von Lichtenberg (1436–1446)
- Theobald Schweinpeck (1446–1463)
- Rudolf von Rüdesheim (1463–1468)
- Johann I von Roth (1468–1483)
- Georg I (1483–1486)
- Erhard Paumgartner (1487–1508)
- Leonhard Peurl (1508–1536)
- Philipp I Renner (1536–1555)
- Martin Herkules Rettinger von Wiespach (1556–1570)
- Georg II Agricola (1570–1584)
- Georg III Stobäus von Palmburg (1584–1618)
- Leonhard II von Götz (1619–1640)
- Albert von Priamis (29 December 1640 – 8 September 1654)
- Max Gandolf von Kuenburg (8 December 1654 – 7 February 1665)
- Sebastian von Pötting-Persing (3 April 1665 – 25 September 1673)
- Franz I Kaspar Freiherr von Stadion (1673.10.21 – 1704.02.13)
- Johann II Sigmund (22 February 1704 – 1 April 1708)
- Philipp II (11 April 1708 – 14 February 1718)
- Leopold Anton von Firmian (11 March 1718 – 17 January 1724)
- Joseph I Oswald von Attems (20 February 1724 – 4 May 1744)
- Virgilius Augustin Maria von Firmian (26 May 1744 – retired 15 July 1753)
- Johann (Baptist) III von Thun-Valsassina (4 February 1754 – 3 June 1762)
- Joseph II Franz Anton von Auersperg (8 May 1763 – 4 January 1764)
- Peter II von Thun (1772)
- Franz II de Paula Xaver Ludwig Jakob, Fürst von Breuner (30 September 1773 – 1 May 1777)
- Vinzenz Joseph von Schrattenbach (31 May 1777 – 29 January 1790)
- Gandolf Ernst Graf von Kuenberg (20 February 1790 – 12 December 1793)
- Vinzenz Joseph von Schrattenbach (26 June 1795 – 11 August 1800)
- Leopold II Maximilian von Firmian (23 November 1800 – 19 April 1822)
- Ignaz Franz Zimmermann (19 May 1824 – 28 September 1843)
- Franz Xaver Kuttnar (23 November 1843 – 8 March 1846)
- Anton Martin Slomšek (30 May 1846 – 24 September 1862)

=== Bishops based in Maribor ===
- Anton Martin Slomšek (30 May 1846 – 24 September 1862)
- Jakob Ignaz Maximilian Stepischnegg (21 December 1862 – 28 June 1889)
- Mihael Napotnik (27 September 1889 – 28 March 1922)
- Andrej Karlin (6 June 1923 – 6 March 1933)
- Ivan Jožef Tomažič (27 June 1933 – 27 February 1949)
- Maksimilijan Držečnik (15 June 1960 – 5 March 1962)

In 1962, the Diocese of Lavant became the Diocese of Maribor; the Bishop of Maribor also held the title of Bishop of Lavant. For those bishops, see the leadership of the Diocese of Maribor.

== See also ==
- List of Catholic dioceses in Austria

== Sources and external links ==
- Lins, Joseph (1910). "Lavant" . Catholic Encyclopedia. Vol. 9.
- GCatholic, with incumbent bios
- Catholic Hierarchy
