= Musti (Tunisia) =

Archaeological site in Tunisia

Coordinates: 36.4100°N 9.0833°E

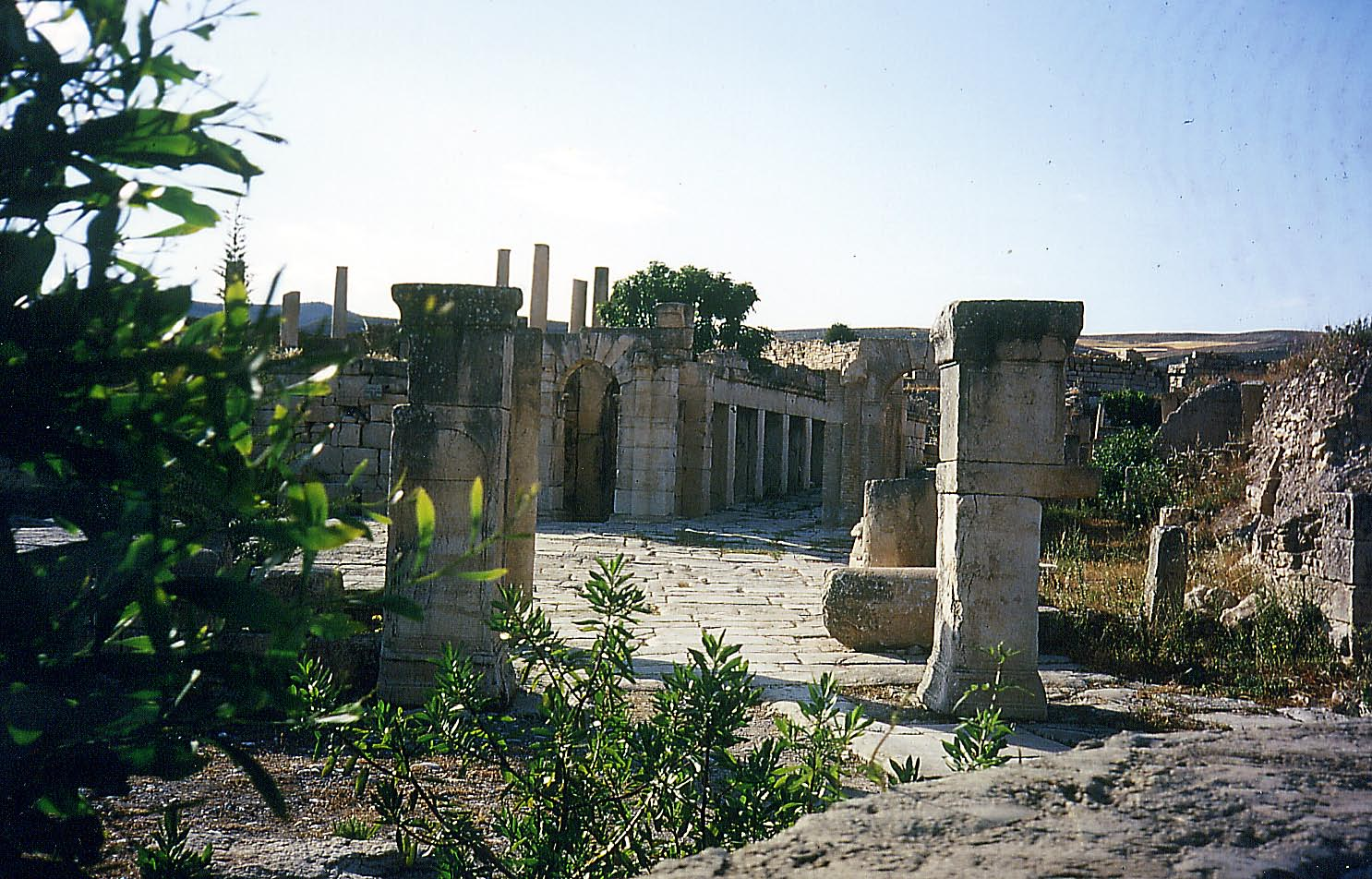
Musti ruins.

Musti or Mustis was an ancient city and bishopric in the Roman province of Proconsular Africa, now in northern Tunisia. Its ruins, called Mest Henshir, are about eight miles from Dougga, near Sidi-Abd-Er-Rebbou. It is also a Catholic titular see.

== History ==
Musti was an important town in the Roman era, located along the Roman road that ran between Carthage and Tebessa, eight miles from Dougga, and near Sidi-Abd-Er-Rebbou. The limits of the town were set in 238 by two triumphal arches, erected on this road which traversed Musti from east to west. Towards the end of 2nd century BC the Roman general Gaius Marius settled his veterans here and at a later time it was elevated to the rank of a municipium by Julius Caesar or by Marcus Aurelius. The ancient Roman town lost its appearance when the Byzantines transformed it into a stronghold during their struggles against the Vandals.

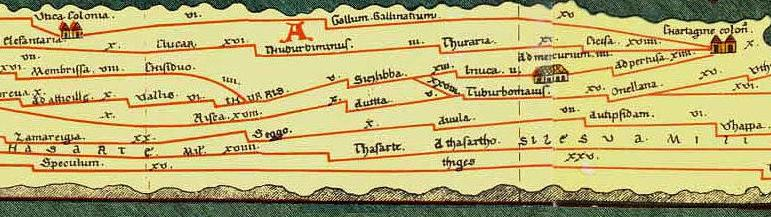
North Africa on Peutinger Table.

The town has only been partially excavated, leaving a large area still to be researched, but nevertheless boasts remains of the forum, the marketplace, built in white calcareous stone several temples, the cisterns, a Byzantine citadel, and a number of Roman houses. There is also a church with a baptistry.

Three temples have been identified at Musti though others were known, One of the temples was converted to a bascillica in the 4th century

Musti is mentioned by Ptolemy, the Itinerarium Antonini, the Peutinger Table, and the Ravenna geographer Vibius Sequester, who narrates the killing at this place of an enormous serpent by Regulus. The inscriptions call the inhabitants Musticenses or Mustitani; the latter name is also used by Augustine.

The Byzantines turned much of the Forum into a fortress during their battles with the Vandals.

== Sights ==
The triumphal arch located at the entrance of the site is still of unknown attribution. The eastern arch, which was in a very ruined state, was restored in 1967 by the National Institute of Art and Archaeology and the Historical Monuments Service. The nearby mausoleum of the Julii was also restored at this time. The entire restoration took 17 months to complete.

The entrance of the site opens onto a large paved yard which leads to an attractive gateway. This gate had a covered walkway on the left and on the right. To the sides are the shops of the moneychangers and some bas-reliefs of well-wishing genies.

Near the gate are the remains of three temples (to Ceres, Pluto and Apollo). Further on are ruins of a small 4th century Christian church, a basilica with three naves and a raised sacred area (the baptistery). It is adjoined by a large Byzantine fortification.

== Archaeology ==
Over 200 Latin inscriptions have been catalogued in Mustis. These include votive inscriptions to Minerva and Neptune, funerary inscriptions, and a boundary stone erected during the reign of Antoninus Pius. A fragmentary inscription mentioning the members of the Severan Dynasty and dedicated to the Capitoline Triad may be evidence that Mustis contained a Capitolium temple.

In 2018, a joint Polish-Tunisian project was commenced by the Polish Centre of Mediterranean Archaeology and the Institute of Archaeology (both University of Warsaw) and the Tunisian Institut National du Patrimoine. A geophysical prospection using the magnetic and electrical resistivity methods was conducted to locate archaeological remains, both in the area where urban architecture was visible on the surface and in the town's vicinity. In 2019, a team of epigraphists documented over 130 Latin inscriptions from the Roman period; their total number at the site is estimated at more than 500. Sondages were also made, and the stratigraphy of the layers was established, reaching back to the pre-Roman period (6th–3rd century BC) when Mustis was inhabited by Numidian tribes.

== Ecclesiastical history ==
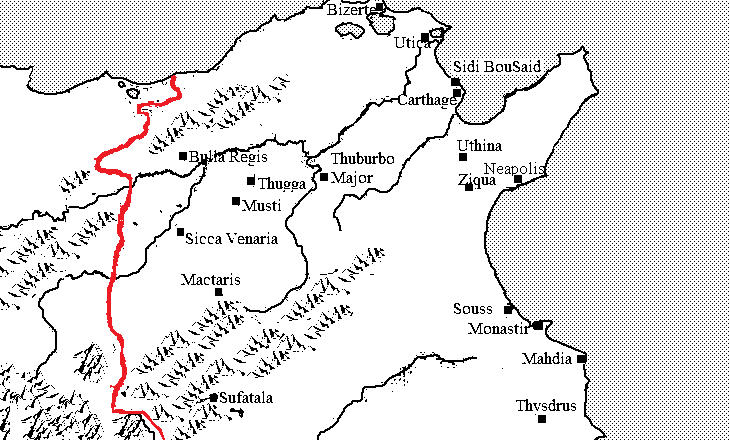
Map of Roman Africa Proconsularae

It was a bishopric, suffragan of the Metropolitan Archbishop of Carthage, both in the Roman province of Africa Proconsularis.

There also was another city and bishopric called Musti in Numidia (modern Algeria), which Sophrone Pétridès confuses with the Musti in the Roman province of Proconsular Africa, even to the extent of presenting the supposed single see as represented at the 411 Council at Carthage by four bishops, two Donatist (Felicianus and Cresconius) and two Catholic (Victorianus and Leontius). J. Mesnage distinguishes between the two sees, assigning Felicianus and Victorianus to the Musti of Proconsular Africa, a suffragan of Carthage, and Cresconius and Leontius to what he calls Musti Numidiae. The Catholic Church's list of titular sees also distinguishes between the two, calling one see simply Musti and the other Musti in Numidia. Mesnage also distinguishes between the sees of two other bishops of whom Pétridès speaks as bishops of a single Musti: an Antonianus of the Numidian Musti was one of the bishops whom the Vandal king Huneric exiled in 482, and the Januarius who in 646 signed the letter of the bishops of Proconsular Africa to Paul, Patriarch of Constantinople, against the monothelites, was obviously of that province.

== Titular see ==
In 1912, the diocese was nominally restored as a Latin titular see, of the lowest (episcopal) rank with a single (archiepiscopal) exception. It has had the following incumbents:

- Jean-Ephrem Bertreux, Society of Mary (S.M.) (1912.06.01 – 1919.01.04)
- Julien-Louis-Edouard-Marie Gorju, White Fathers (M. Afr.) (1922.04.26 – 1942.01.14)
- Eugenio Raffaele Faggiano, Passionists (C.P.) (1956.09.25 – 1960.05.02)
- Vicente Alfredo Aducci (1960.05.28 – 1962.05.03)
- Oscar Félix Villena (1962.07.26 – 1970.02.11)
- Titular archbishop Juan José Aníbal Mena Porta (1970.06.16 – 1970.11.25)
- Aldo Del Monte (1970.12.29 – 1972.01.15)
- Gaetano Bonicelli (1975.07.10 – 1977.06.11) (later Archbishop)
- Antonio Ambrosanio (1977.08.27 – 1988.01.04) (later Archbishop)
- Francisco João Silota, M. Afr. (74) (1988.01.18 – 1990.11.19)
- Giuseppe Pasotto, Stigmatines (C.S.S.) (1999.11.09 – ...), Apostolic Administrator of Caucasus

== Sources and external links ==
- German Tunisia Projekt
- GigaCatholic with titular incumbent biography links
- Mustis Archaeological Project
- Cassiciaco (in Italian)
- Unesco pdf-file (French document)
- Herbermann, Charles, ed. (1913). "Musti" . Catholic Encyclopedia. New York: Robert Appleton Company.
- Pius Bonifacius Gams, Series episcoporum Ecclesiae Catholicae, Leipzig 1931, p. 467
- Stefano Antonio Morcelli, Africa christiana, Volume I, Brescia 1816, p. 236
- J. Mesnage, L'Afrique chrétienne, Paris 1912, p. 424.
- Beschaouch, Azedine (2014). "Municipium Iulium Aurelium Mustitanum: de Tibère à Marc Aurèle, l’histoire Municipale de Mustis, cité romaine de Tunisie." Comptes rendus des séances de l’Académie des Inscriptions et Belles-Lettres 2014, pp. 1585–1596.
- Scheding, Paul (2019). Urbaner Ballungsraum im römischen Nordafrika. Zum Einfluss von mikroregionalen Wirtschafts- und Sozialstrukturen auf den Städtebau in der Africa Proconsularis [Urban agglomeration in Roman North Africa. On the influence of micro-regional economic and social structures on urban development in Africa Proconsularis]. Wiesbaden: Reichert, ISBN 978-3-95490-313-9 (with Musti as one of five case studies).
