= Musti in Numidia =

Musti in Numidia, also called Musti Numidiae, was an ancient city and bishop jurisdiction^{(bishopric)}, and is presently a Catholic titular see,^{(bishop's government see of a former government under a church's responsibility, also known as a dead diocese.)} in modern Algeria.

== History ==
It was important enough in the Roman province of Numidia to become a suffragan bishopric of its capital's Metropolitan Archbishop of Cirta (modern Constantine, Algeria), but later faded.

There also was another city and bishopric called Musti in the Roman province of Africa Proconsularis, which Sophrone Pétridès confuses with Musti in Numidia (modern Algeria), even to the extent of presenting the supposed single see as represented at the 411 Council at Carthage by four bishops, two Donatist (Felicianus and Cresconius) and two Catholic (Victorianus and Leontius). J. Mesnage distinguishes between the two sees, assigning Felicianus and Victorianus to the Musti of Proconsular Africa, a suffragan of Carthage, and Cresconius and Leontius to what he calls Musti Numidiae. The Catholic Church's list of titular sees also distinguishes between the two, calling one see simply Musti and the other Musti in Numidia. Mesnage also distinguishes between the sees of two other bishops of whom Pétridès speaks as bishops of a single Musti: an Antonianus of the Numidian Musti was one of the bishops whom the Vandal king Huneric exiled in 482, and the Januarius who in 646 signed the letter of the bishops of Proconsular Africa to Paul, Patriarch of Constantinople, against the monothelites, was obviously of that province.

== Titular see ==
The bishopric was founded during the Roman Empire and survived through the Arian Vandal Kingdom and Orthodox Byzantine Empire, only ceasing to function with the Muslim conquest of the Maghreb.

=== Known bishops ===
- Leonzio (Catholic bishop mentioned at Council of Carthage (411)
- Cresconio (Donatist bishop) (mentioned at Council of Carthage (411)
- Anthony (Catholic bishop attended the synod in Carthage in 484 called by the Vandal king, Huneric, after which Anthony was exiled)

The diocese was nominally restored as a Latin Catholic titular bishopric only in 1989. It has had the following incumbents, all of the lowest (episcopal) rank:

- Salvatore Gristina (1992.07.16 – 1999.01.23), as Auxiliary Bishop of Palermo (Italy) (1992.07.16 – 1999.01.23); later Bishop of Acireale (Italy) (1999.01.23 – 2002.06.07), Metropolitan Archbishop of Catania (Italy) (2002.06.07 – ...)
- Andrej Glavan (2000.05.13 – 2006.04.07)
- Peter Štumpf, S.D.B. (2006.05.24 – 2009.11.28)
- Paolo Martinelli, O.F.M. Cap. (2014.05.24 – ...), Auxiliary Bishop of Milan (Italy)

== Sources and external links ==
- GigaCatholic, with titular incumbent biography links
- Herbermann, Charles, ed. (1913). "Musti" . Catholic Encyclopedia. New York: Robert Appleton Company.
- J. Mesnage, L'Afrique chrétienne, Paris 1912, p. 424
