= St. Andrä =

- Municipality
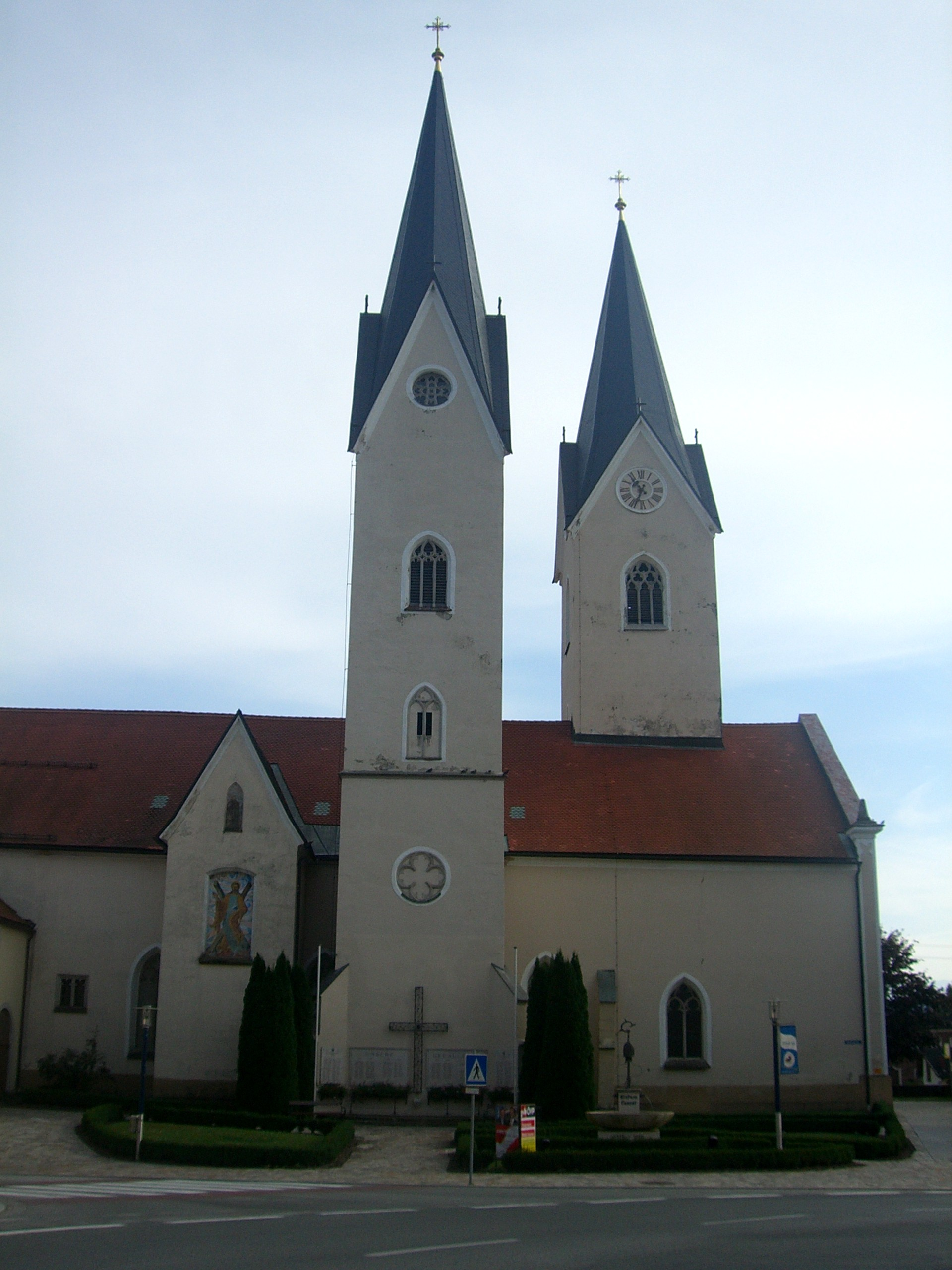

- Coat of arms

- Location within Austria
- Coordinates: 46°46′N 14°49′E
- Country: Austria
- State: Carinthia
- District: Wolfsberg

Government
  - Mayor: Peter Stauber

Area
  - Total: 113.47 km^{2} (43.81 sq mi)
- Elevation: 446 m (1,463 ft)

Population (2018-01-01)
  - Total: 9,957
  - Density: 87.75/km^{2} (227.3/sq mi)
- Time zone: UTC+1 (CET)
  - Summer (DST): UTC+2 (CEST)
- Postal code: 9433
- Area code: 04358
- Website: www.st-andrae.at

St. Andrä (Slovene: Sveti Andrej) is a town in the district of Wolfsberg in Carinthia in Austria. It is named after Saint Andrew.

== Landmarks ==
The main church is Saint Andrew's Church, until 1859 a cathedral and the bishop's seat of the Diocese of Lavant.

== Population ==
Historical population
Year	Pop.	±%
1869	6,515	—
1880	6,686	+2.6%
1890	6,716	+0.4%
1900	6,708	−0.1%
1910	6,625	−1.2%
1923	6,646	+0.3%
1934	6,934	+4.3%
1939	7,356	+6.1%
1951	7,987	+8.6%
1961	9,131	+14.3%
1971	10,174	+11.4%
1981	10,400	+2.2%
1991	10,582	+1.8%
2001	10,719	+1.3%
2011	10,332	−3.6%
2021	9,850	−4.7%
