= Diocese of Celje =

Roman Catholic diocese in Slovenia

Coordinates: 46°13′44.95″N 15°15′45.9″E

Diocese of Celje Dioecesis Celeiensis Škofija Celje

Catholic
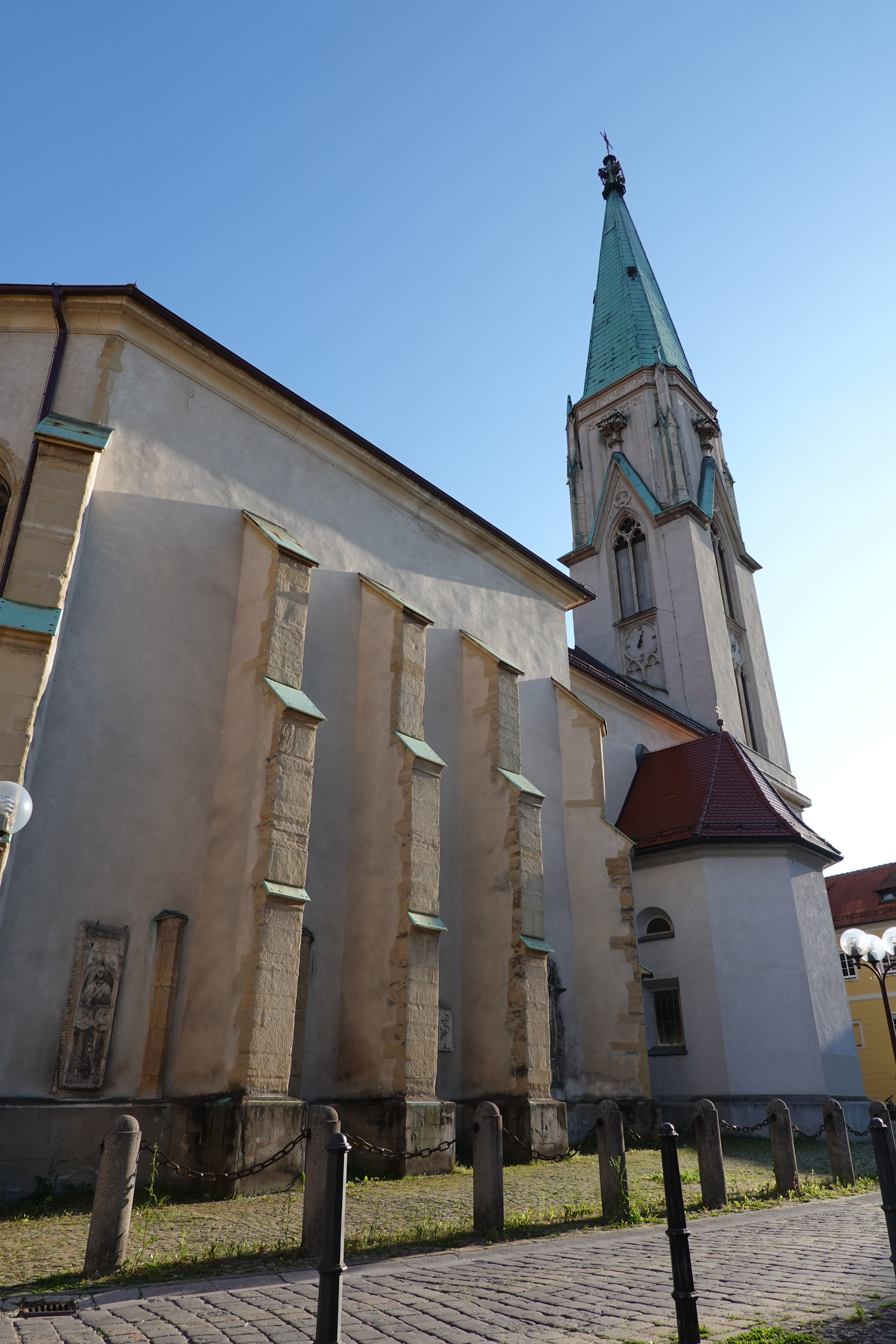
- Celje Cathedral, dedicated to Saint Daniel

Location
- Country: Slovenia
- Ecclesiastical province: Maribor
- Metropolitan: Archdiocese of Maribor

Statistics
- Area: 2,711.4 km^{2} (1,046.9 sq mi)
- Population: Total; Catholics: (as of 2023); 277,979; 212,886 (76.6%)
- Parishes: 112
- Churches: 333

Information
- Rite: Latin Rite
- Established: 7 April 2006
- Cathedral: Celje Cathedral (stolnica sv. Danijela)

Current leadership
- Pope: Leo XIV
- Bishop: Maksimilijan Matjaž
- Metropolitan Archbishop: Alojzij Cvikl
- Bishops emeritus: Stanislav Lipovšek

Website
- skofija-celje.si

The Diocese of Celje (Latin: Dioecesis Celeiensis; Slovene: Škofija Celje) is a Latin Church diocese of the Catholic Church located in the city of Celje in the ecclesiastical province of Maribor in Slovenia.

== History ==
Little is known about the early diocese of Celje (Celeia), in Noricum, which in the 6th and 7th centuries was a suffragan of the Patriarchate of Aquileia. The names of two bishops are known: Gaudentius, whose name was recovered from an inscription discovered near the present-day city, who is believed to have lived in the 6th century; and John, who took part in the Synod of Grado of 579 and that of Synod of Marano in 589 or 590, and who became involved in the dispute following the Schism of the Three Chapters. The attribution to this diocese of Bishop Andrew, who took part in the Roman council of 680 —where the heresy of Monothelitism was condemned— is uncertain. Subsequently, no further records of this diocese exist.

The new diocese was erected on April 7, 2006, by the papal bull Varia inter munera of Pope Benedict XVI, taking its territory from the Diocese of Maribor, which at the same time was elevated to the rank of a metropolitan archdiocese.

== Leadership ==
- Bishops of Celje (Roman rite)
  - Anton Stres (7 April 2006 — 31 January 2010)
  - Stanislav Lipovšek (24 April 2010 – 18 September 2018)
  - Maksimilijan Matjaž (since 5 March 2021)

== Special churches ==
- Minor basilica:
  - Basilica of the Visitation of Mary, Petrovče
  - Basilica of St. Mary of Lourdes, Brestanica

== See also ==
- Roman Catholicism in Slovenia

== Sources ==
- Media related to Roman Catholic Diocese of Celje at Wikimedia Commons
- Official site
- GCatholic.org
- Catholic Hierarchy

- Giuseppe Cappelletti, Le chiese d'Italia dalla loro origine sino ai nostri giorni, Venice, 1851, vol. VIII, p. 838
- J. Zeiller, v. Celeia, in Dictionnaire d'Histoire et de Géographie ecclésiastiques, vol. XII, Paris, 1953, coll. 51-52
