= Celje Cathedral =

Coordinates: 46.2272°N 15.2648°E

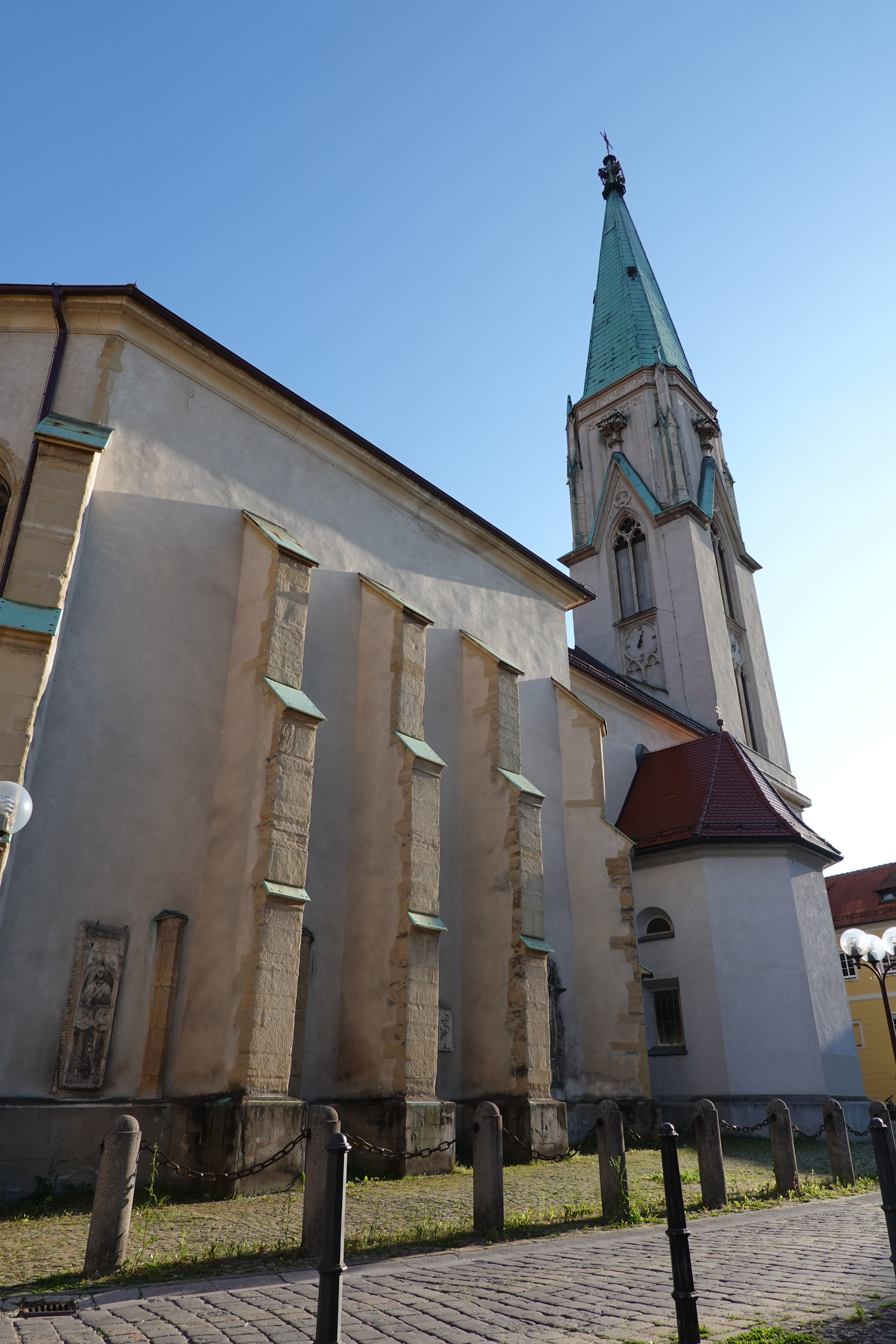
Cathedral's exterior

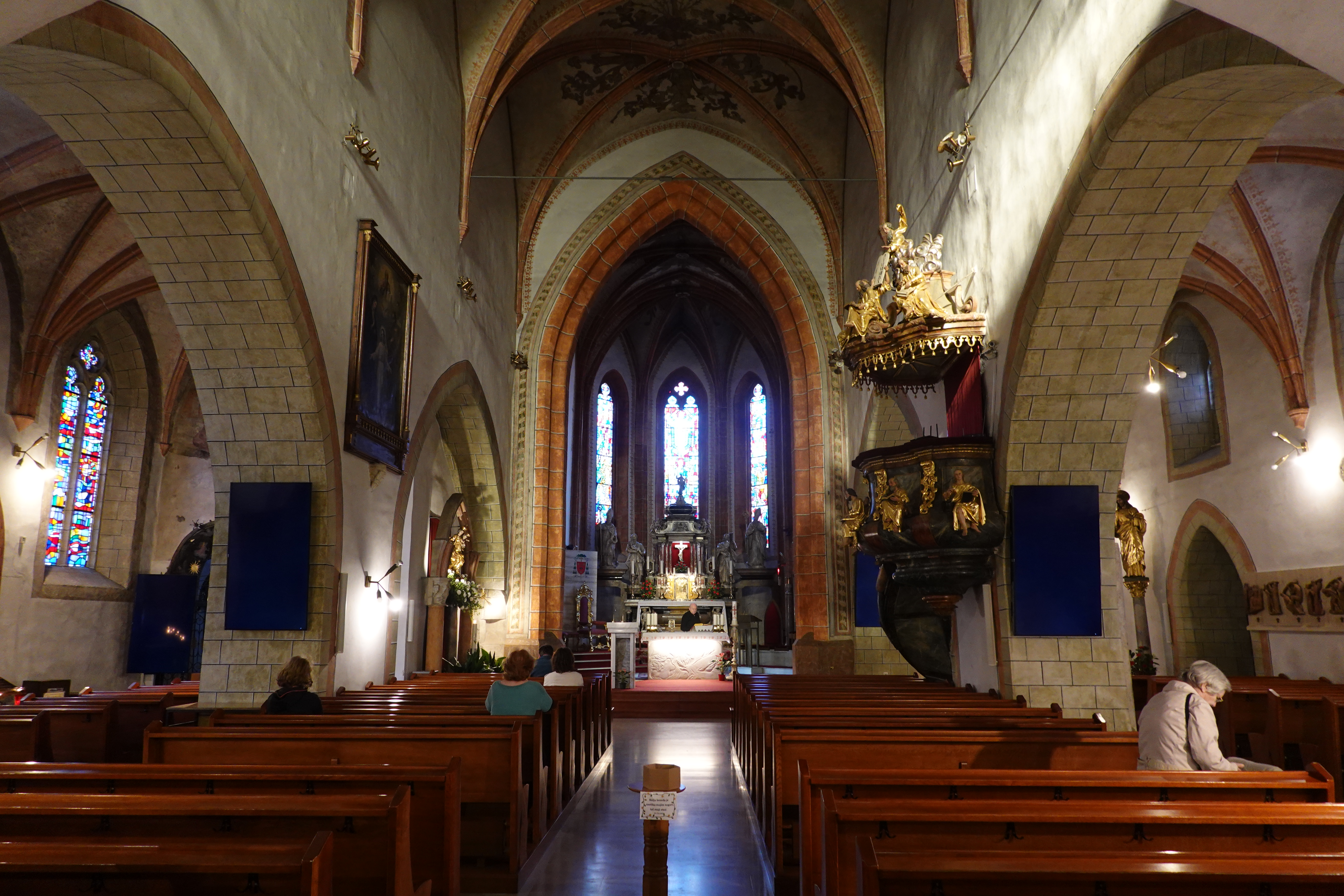
Cathedral's interior

Celje Cathedral (Slovene: celjska stolnica) is a Roman Catholic cathedral dedicated to the Prophet Daniel in Celje, Slovenia. It has been the episcopal seat of the diocese of Celje since the creation of the diocese in 2006.

== History and description ==
As early as the 12th century there was a small basilica on the site. This was replaced in 1306 by the present building, which served as the church of the abbey which during the Middle Ages stood on the edge of the town. In 1379 the rib vaulted roof was created. The church was altered several times up to the 16th century. In 1413 the Gothic chapel of the Mater Dolorosa was added, which was dedicated in 1420 by the bishop of Freising, Hermann von Cilli. Here is located a carved wooden Pietà, which is the main treasure of the church.

The three-aisled nave has a flat roof and a separate space for the segregated use of nuns. The ceilings are decorated with frescoes of the 15th century, but those of the choir are older than those of the nave: the fragment of the figure of Christ in the middle of the choir ceiling may even date from the 14th century. Other frescoes depict the Three Kings.

During the Baroque period a brightly-decorated chapel of Saint Francis Xavier was added.

The painting of the chancel is by Michael Rosenberger, an artist who restored it in 1851. In 1858 the church was given its present Gothic Revival appearance. Various gravestones from the Middle Ages and the Renaissance (up to the 17th century) decorate the inside and outside walls.

The 39th bishop of Freising, Hermann von Cilli, who died in Celje on 13 December 1421 after an operation, was buried in the church. His monument is now in the presbytery on the Gospel side.

After the reform of the liturgy the windows of the chapel of the Mother of God were replaced by colourful modern windows.

== Sources and external links ==
- slovenia.info (in German)
- Netzpräsenz der Kathedrale ((in Slovene)
