= Jankova =

- Location in Slovenia
- Coordinates: 46°18′3.03″N 15°19′46.56″E
- Country: Slovenia
- Traditional region: Styria
- Statistical region: Savinja
- Municipality: Vojnik

Area
  - Total: 1.02 km^{2} (0.39 sq mi)
- Elevation: 297.5 m (976 ft)

Population (2002)
  - Total: 98

Jankova (pronounced [ˈjaːŋkɔʋa]) is a settlement in the Municipality of Vojnik in eastern Slovenia. The entire area of the municipality is part of the traditional region of Styria. It is now included into the Savinja Statistical Region.
