= Archdiocese of Maribor =

Latin Catholic jurisdiction in Slovenia

Coordinates: 46°33′32.87″N 15°38′41.99″E

Archdiocese of Maribor Archidioecesis Mariborensis Nadškofija Maribor

Catholic
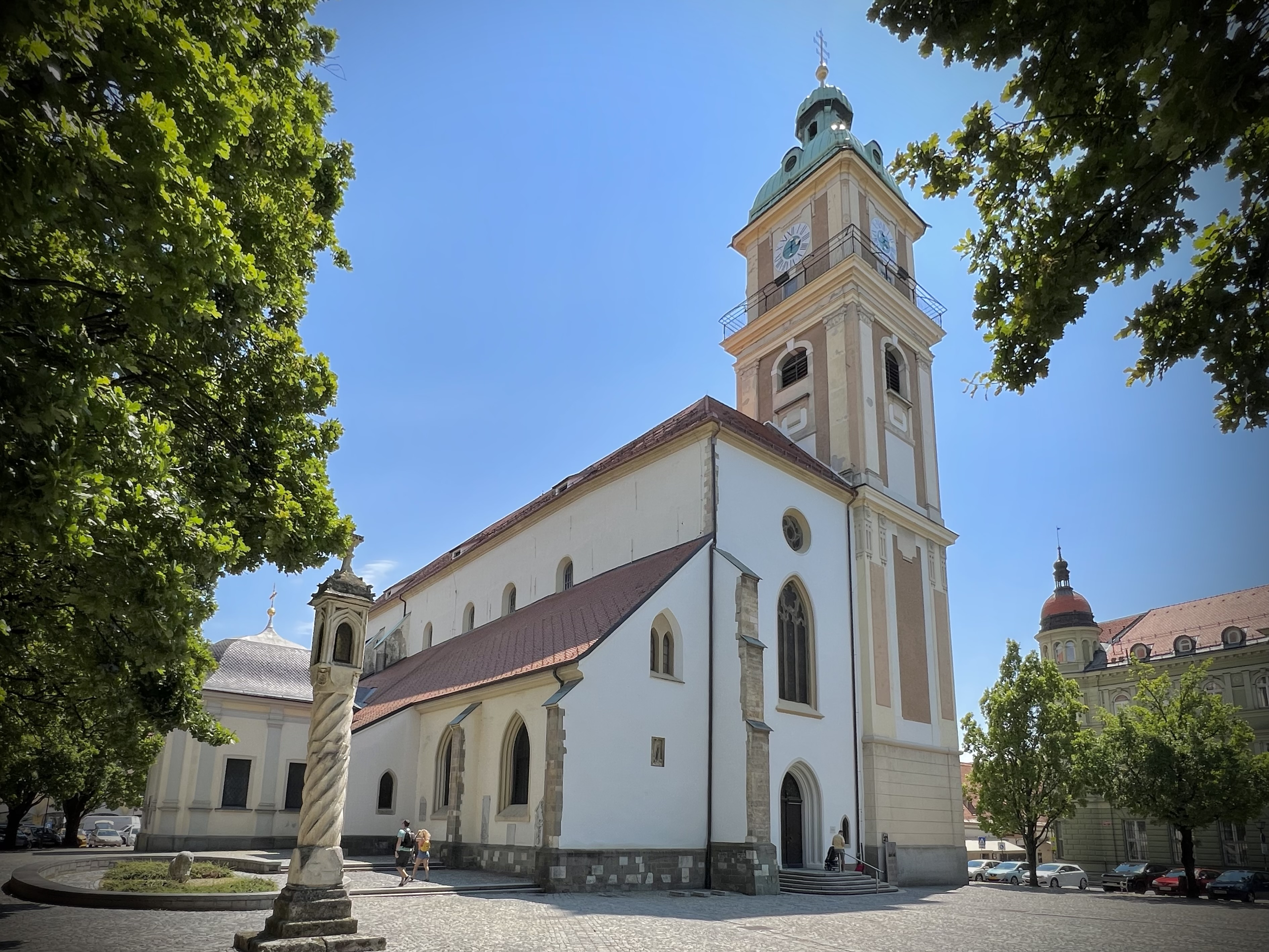
- Maribor Cathedral

Location
- Country: Slovenia

Statistics
- Area: 7,398 km^{2} (2,856 sq mi)
- Population: Total; Catholics: (as of 2004); 826,229; 704,384 (85.3%)

Information
- Denomination: Catholic Church
- Sui iuris church: Latin Church
- Rite: Roman Rite
- Cathedral: Maribor Cathedral (stolnica sv. Janeza Krstnika)

Current leadership
- Pope: Leo XIV
- Archbishop: Alojzij Cvikl, S.J.
- Bishops emeritus: Franc Kramberger, Archbishop Emeritus (2006-2011); Marjan Turnšek, Archbishop Emeritus (2011-2013)

Website
- Website of the Archdiocese

The Archdiocese of Maribor (Latin: Archidioecesis Mariborensis, Slovene: Nadškofija Maribor) is a Latin Church ecclesiastical jurisdiction or archdiocese of the Catholic Church in Slovenia. Its episcopal see is Maribor.

== History ==
- 1859 : Maribor (then Marburg) became the see of the Diocese of Lavant
- March 5, 1962: Established as Diocese of Maribor from the Diocese of Lavant
- April 7, 2006: Promoted as Metropolitan Archdiocese of Maribor

It was reported in January 2012 that the Archdiocese of Maribor was in deep financial difficulties and just before bankruptcy. The whole amount of debts, provoked by high-risk investments was 800 million euros. The Archbishop of Maribor, Marjan Turnšek, and the Archbishop of Ljubljana, Anton Stres, have resigned due to their involvement after the request by Pope Francis.

== United titles ==
- Lavant (since March 5, 1962)

== Special churches ==
- Former Cathedral:
  - St George's Cathedral Church, Ptuj
- Minor Basilica:
  - Basilica of Mary, Mother of Mercy (Maribor)
  - Basilica of Our Lady of the Shroud (Ptujska Gora)

== Leadership ==
- Bishops of Maribor
  - Maksimilijan Držečnik (5 March 1962 – 13 May 1978)
  - Franc Kramberger (6 November 1980 – 7 April 2006); see below
- Archbishops of Maribor
  - Franc Kramberger (7 April 2006 – 3 February 2011); see above
  - Marjan Turnšek (3 February 2011 - 31 July 2013)
    - Stanislav Lipovšek, Bishop of Celje, Apostolic Administrator (31 July 2013 – 26 April 2015)
  - Alojzij Cvikl, S.J. (14 March 2015 - present)

- Coadjutor archbishop Anton Stres (31 January 2009 – 28 November 2009), did not succeed to see; appointed Archbishop of Ljubljana
- Coadjutor archbishop Marjan Turnšek (28 November 2009 – 3 February 2011)

== Suffragan dioceses ==
- Celje
- Murska Sobota

== See also ==
- Roman Catholicism in Slovenia
