= Maribor Cathedral =

Church in Maribor, Slovenia

Coordinates: 46°33′32.87″N 15°38′41.99″E

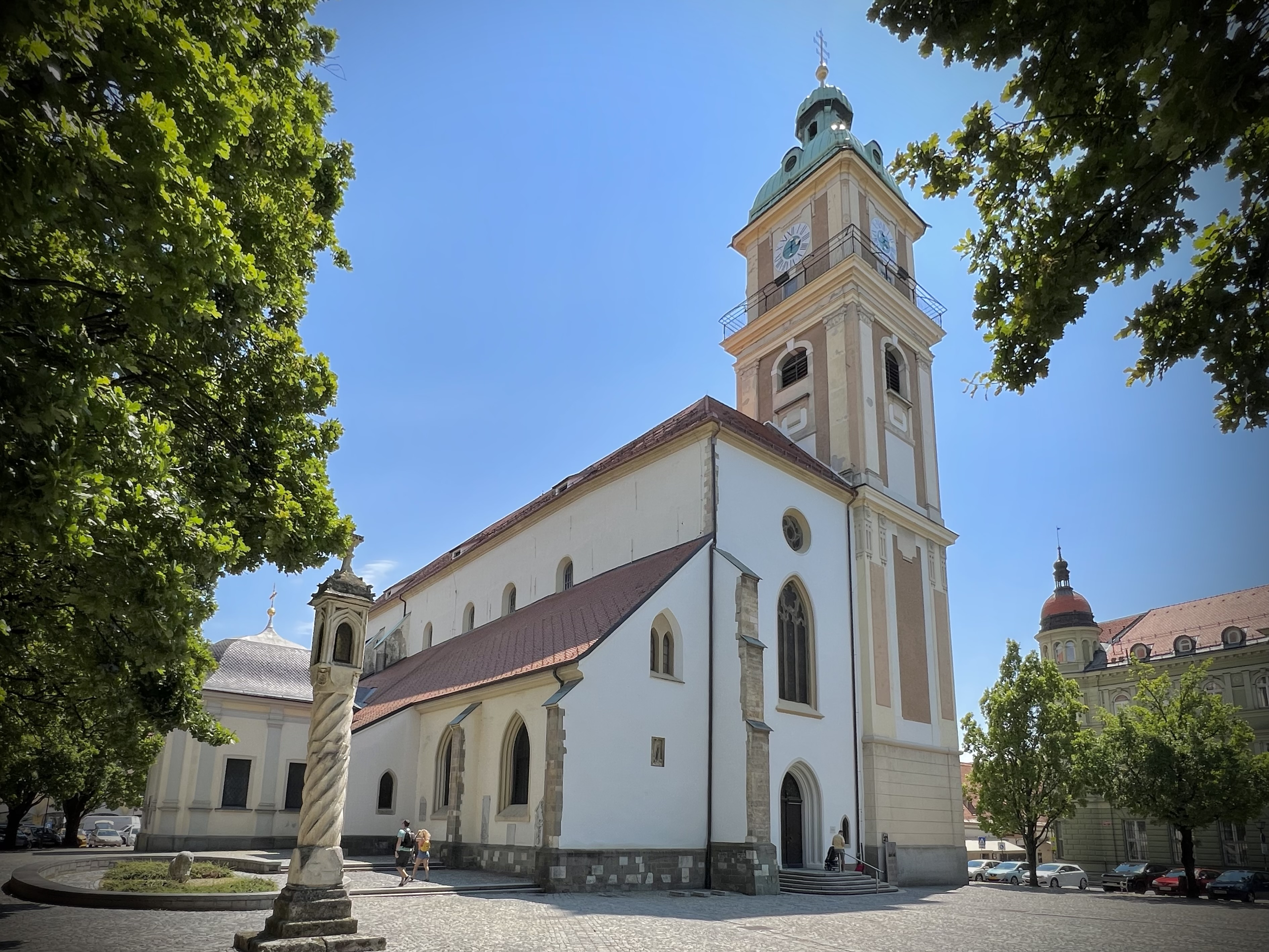
Exterior

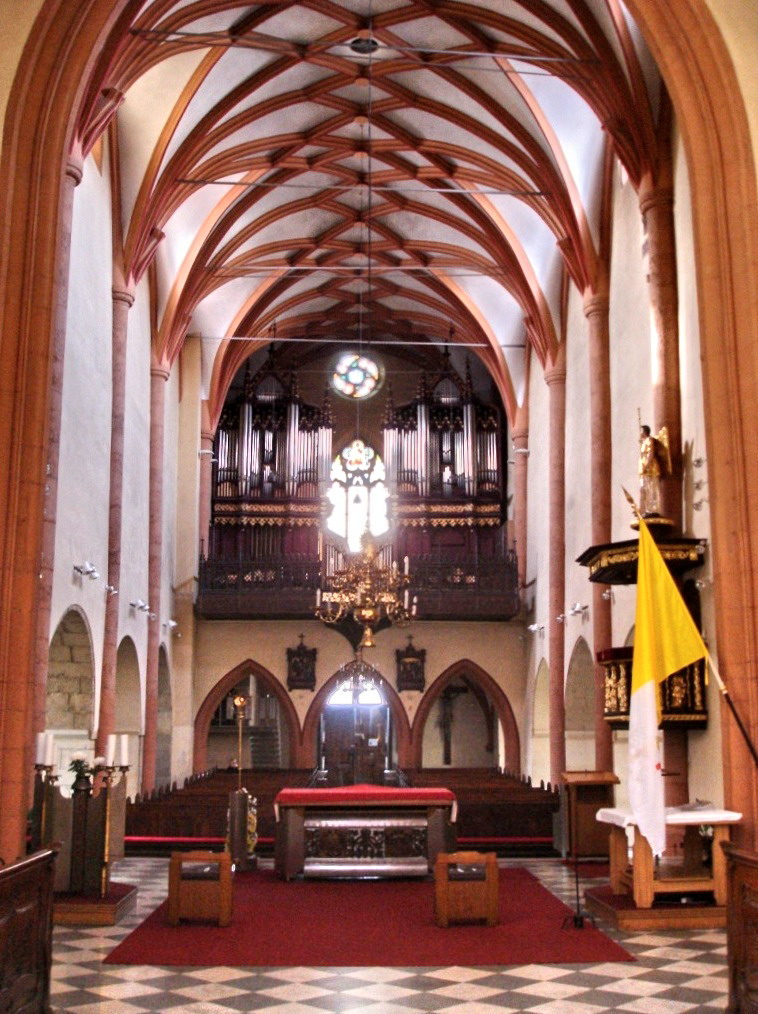
Interior

Maribor Cathedral

Maribor Cathedral (Slovene: mariborska stolnica), dedicated to Saint John the Baptist, is a Roman Catholic cathedral in the city of Maribor, northeastern Slovenia. The church is the seat of the Roman Catholic Archdiocese of Maribor and the parish church of the Parish of Maribor–St. John the Baptist. It is also the resting place of Bishop Anton Martin Slomšek, an advocate of Slovene culture.

== Architecture ==
The originally Romanesque building dates to the late 12th century. In the Gothic period, it got a rib vault, a larger choir and two side naves, whereas in the Baroque period, it got the chapel of Saint Francis Xavier and the chapel of the Holy Cross.
