= Johann Tautscher =

16th-century Catholic bishop

His Excellency Johann Tautscher
- Prince-Bishop of Ljubljana
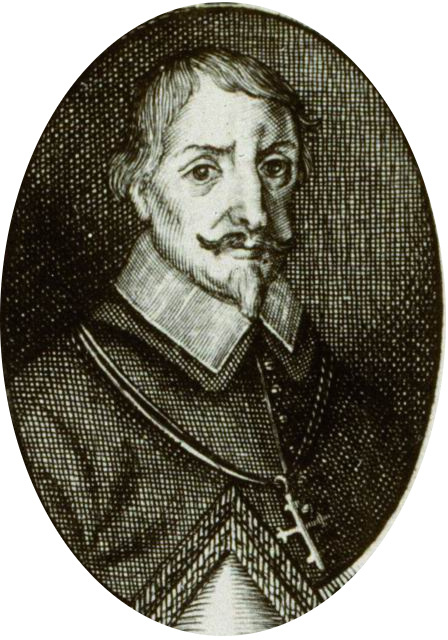
- Diocese: Ljubljana
- Installed: 1580
- Term ended: 1597
- Predecessor: Balthasar Radlitz
- Successor: Thomas Chrön

Orders
- Ordination: 1569

Personal details
- Born: c. 1544 Štanjel, Slovenia
- Died: August 24, 1597 Graz, Austria

Johann Tautscher (Slovenized: Janez Tavčar, c. 1544 – August 24, 1597) was a Roman Catholic priest and bishop of Ljubljana.

== Life and work ==
Tautscher was born around 1544 to a peasant family in Štanjel (according to the general belief, or according to folk tradition in Dutovlje or Kreplje), and he died in Graz and was buried in Gornji Grad. In Vienna, where he studied theology, Tautscher was registered as "de Sancto Michaele Carnus" and "Goritiensis", and he was a close relative of his predecessors as bishop of Ljubljana: Urban Textor and Konrad Adam Gluschitz. He was ordained a priest on March 27, 1569. In 1571 he became the parish priest in Komen (succeeding Gluschitz), in 1574 the parish priest in Gorizia, in 1577 the archdeacon of the Patriarchate of Aquileia, and in 1578 the Reformation Commissioner for the Deanery of Kranj. After the death of Bishop Balthasar Radlitz, on March 1, 1580 Archduke Charles proposed Tautscher as the bishop of Ljubljana. The choice of Tautscher faced no opposition, and he was confirmed on May 20 and received episcopal consecration in August 1580. He held his first episcopal office on October 30, 1580 in Gornji Grad. Tautscher rarely lived in Ljubljana. In his first years as bishop, he managed the diocese from his residence in Gornji Grad. On September 24, 1584, Archduke Charles appointed him his advisor and provincial deputy in Graz, which further contributed to Tautscher remaining outside the diocese. Before his death, Tautscher recommended the Ljubljana dean and preacher Thomas Chrön to Archduke Ferdinand as his successor. Tautscher died in Graz, and after his death his body was transported to Gornji Grad, where he was buried and Bishop Chrön had a tombstone erected.
