= Štanjel =

Štanjel San Daniele del Carso
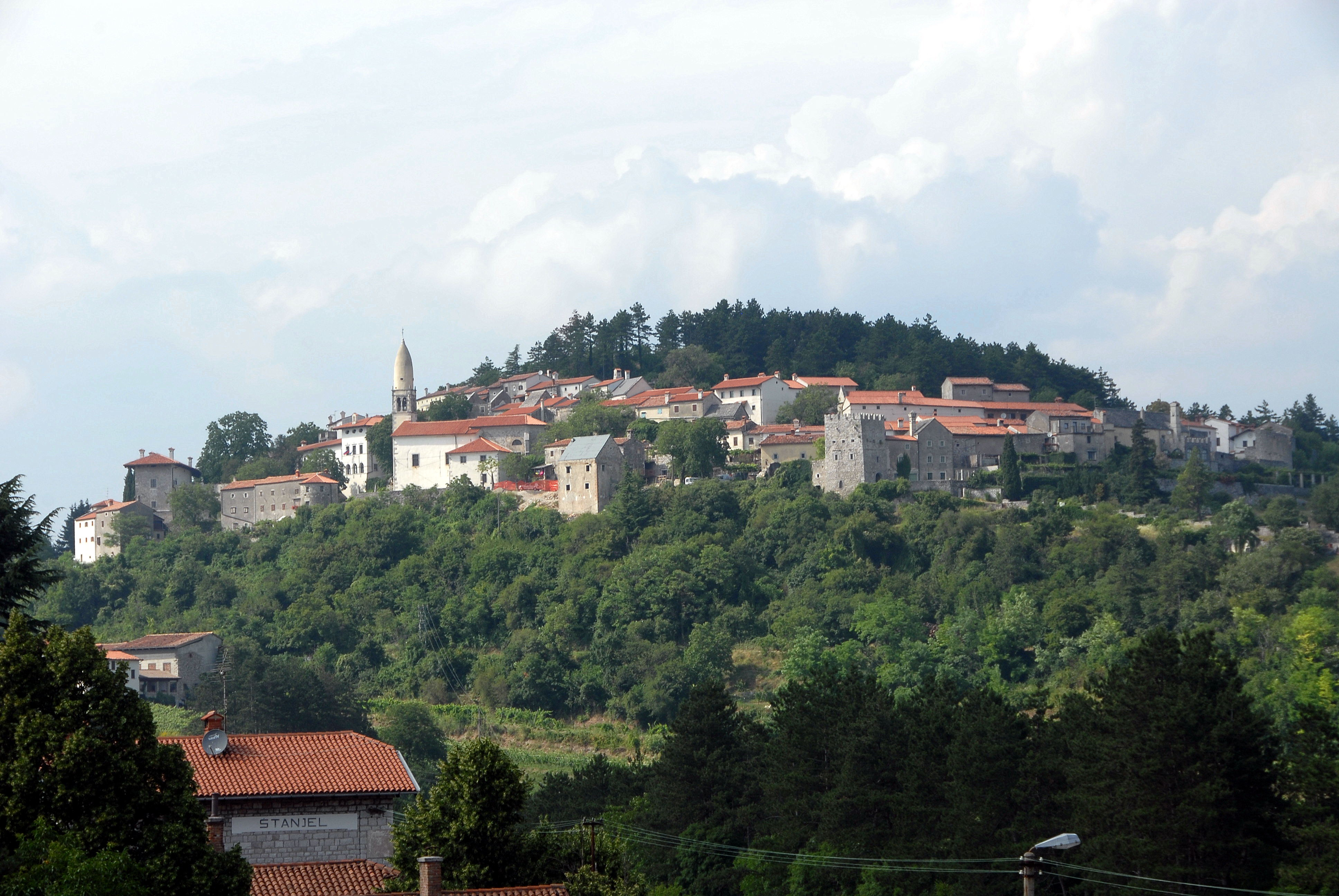

- Location in Slovenia
- Coordinates: 45°49′23.87″N 13°50′38.46″E
- Country: Slovenia
- Traditional region: Slovene Littoral
- Statistical region: Coastal–Karst
- Municipality: Komen

Area
  - Total: 3.75 km^{2} (1.45 sq mi)
- Elevation: 312.1 m (1,024 ft)

Population (2002)
  - Total: 340

Štanjel (pronounced [ˈʃtaːnjɛu̯]; Italian: San Daniele del Carso) is a village in the Municipality of Komen in the Littoral region of Slovenia. It is located on the Karst Plateau overlooking the Vipava Valley. In the 17th century it was fortified to defend it against Ottoman raids. It was heavily damaged during World War II and it has been slowly rebuilt since.

== History ==
Because of its geographical location it has been an important settlement in the area since the Iron Age. The development of the settlement reached its peak in the Romanesque period, although Gothic elements in architecture have also been preserved.

During World War II the village served as a smaller base for the German occupation units, and was heavily damaged during the Allied bombing at the end of the war. After the war it was gradually renovated. After the war, a notable resident of the village was the graphic artist Lojze Spacal.

== Landmarks ==
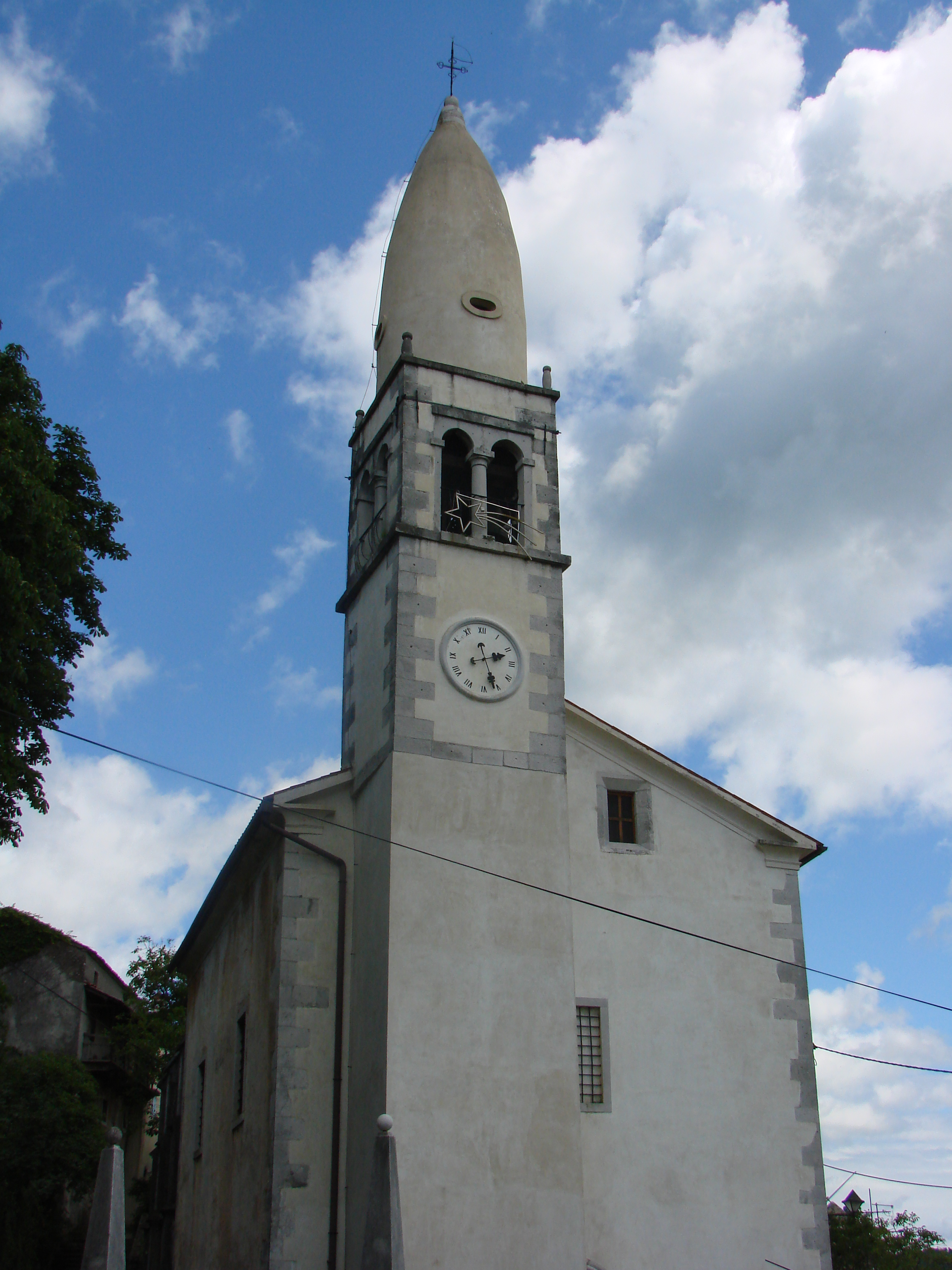
Prophet Daniel Parish Church

=== Castle ===
The castle of Štanjel was built in the Middle Ages, its final reconstruction which remains up to this day was made at the end of the 17th century by the Counts of Cobenzl. An art gallery with a permanent collection of Spacal's work is in the castle.

=== Churches ===
The Parish Church of the Prophet Daniel was built in the 15th century as the burial vault of the Counts of Cobenzl. The lemon-shaped church tower was built in 1609.

A smaller church dedicated to Saint Gregory was also built on the neighboring hill in the 15th century, where Max Fabiani's grave is located. The town walls that surround most of the village were also built in the 15th century to protect the settlement from the Ottoman raids.

=== Ferrari Garden ===
Ferrari Garden

The Ferrari Garden (Slovene: Ferrarijev vrt) is a major landmark in the settlement and one of the most visited ones. It was designed by Max Fabiani at the request of the physician Enrico Ferrari in the 1920s. The garden is located below the village, next to a villa, and houses a small pool with an island which is connected by a bridge to the shore. The location is popular among tourists because of its design and the view it offers of the Karst landscape below. The park has been declared a natural park and a national monument by the Government of Slovenia.

== Notable people ==
Notable people that were born or lived in Štanlej include:

- Johann Tautscher (c. 1544–1597), bishop of Ljubljana
- Max Fabiani (1865–1962), mayor of Štanjel

== Gallery ==
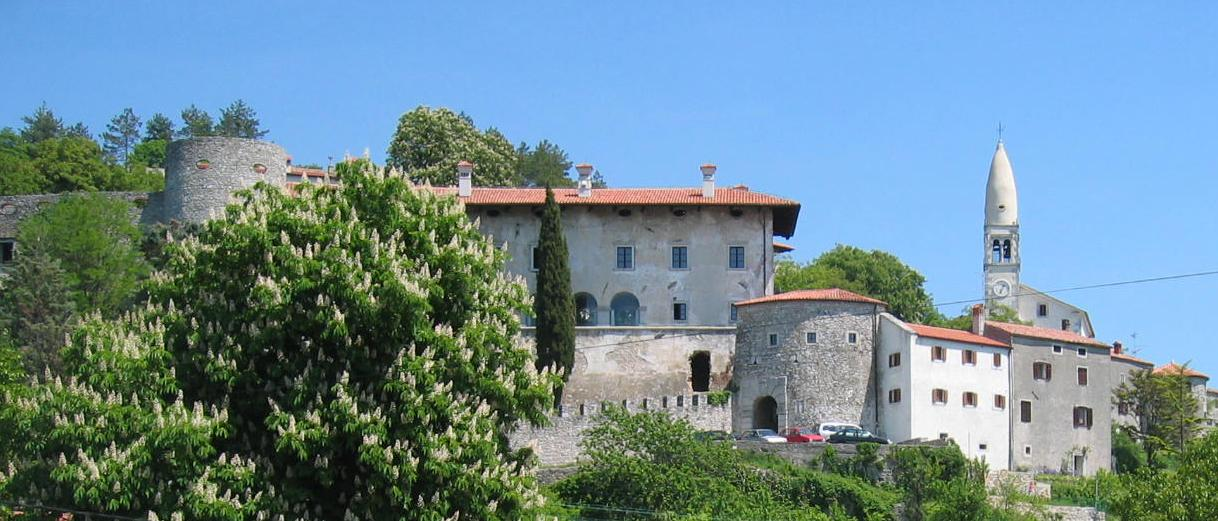
Štanjel as seen from below the walls

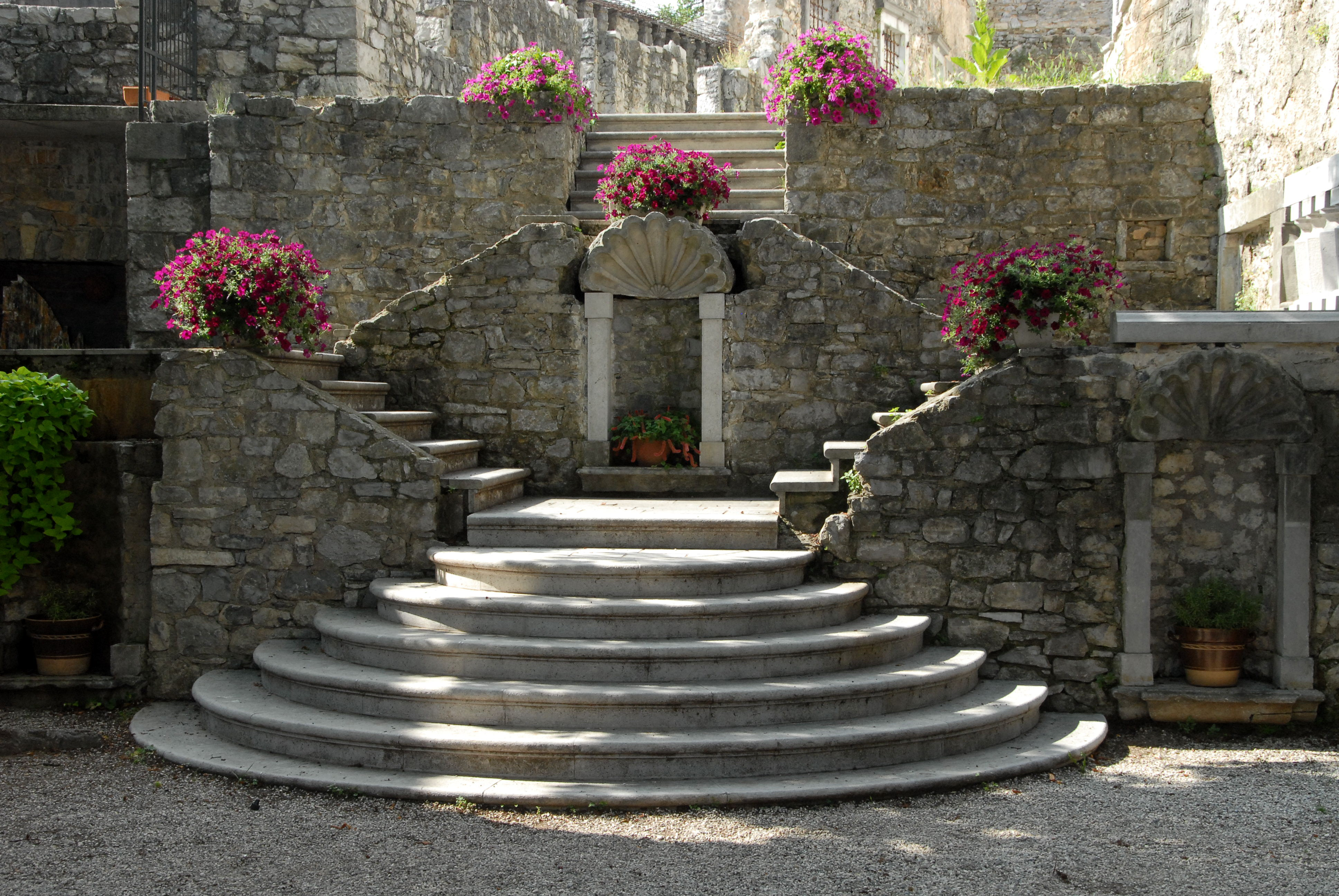
Entrance to the castle

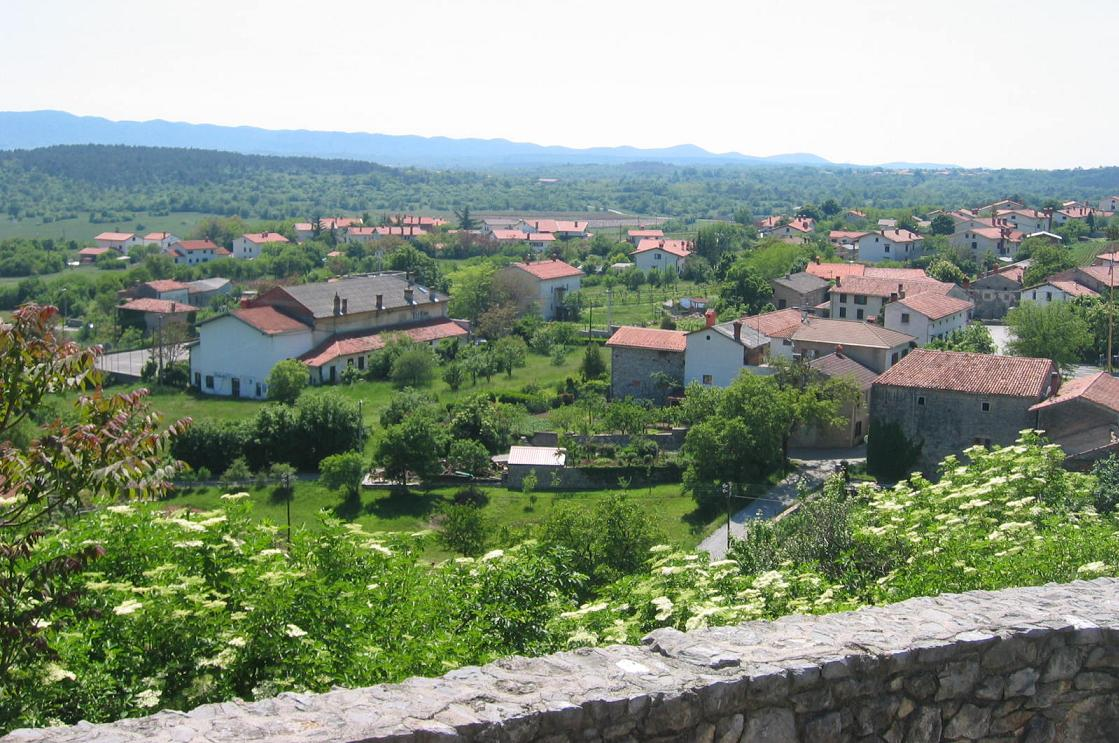
The newer part of the village located below the hill

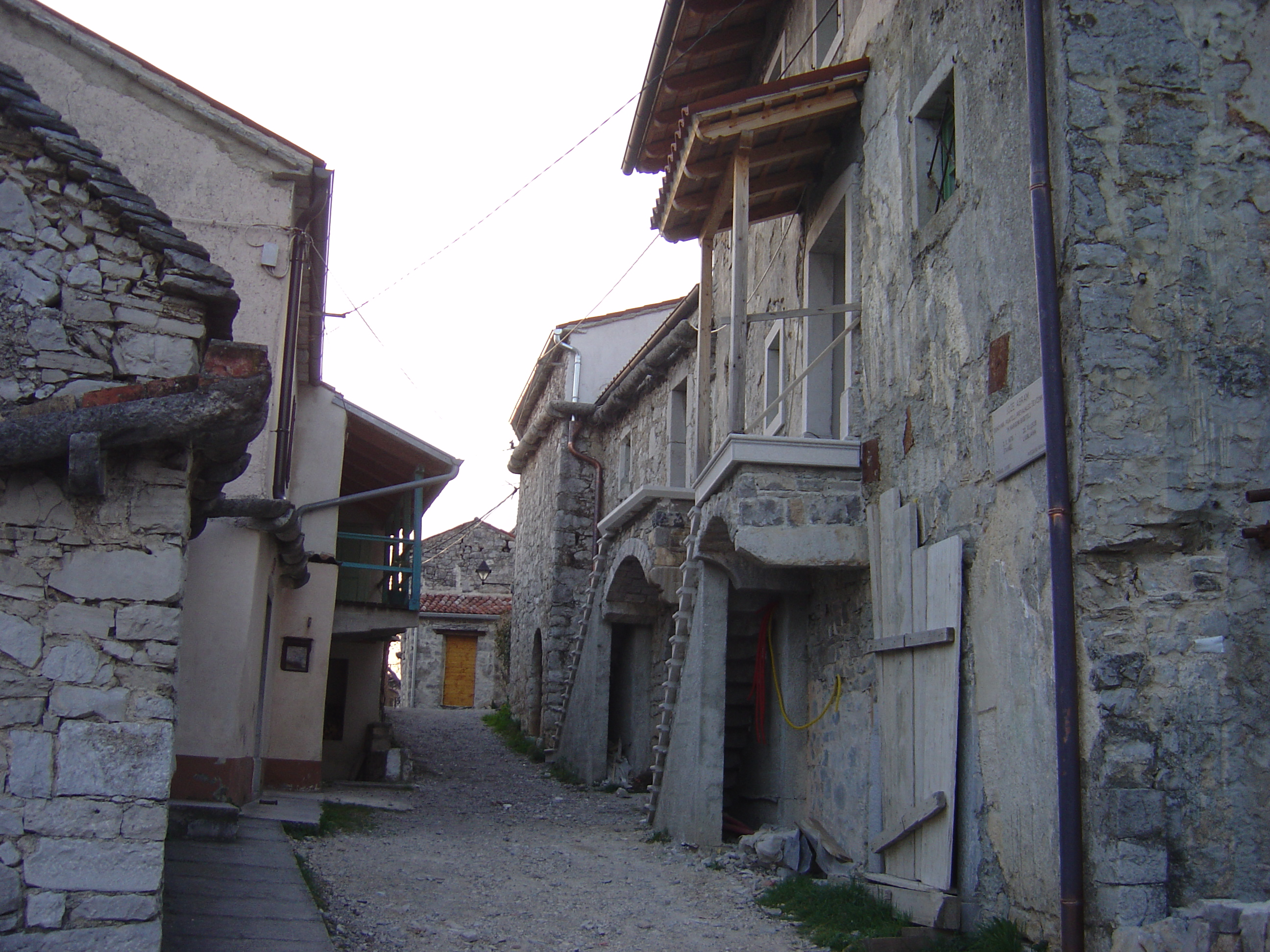
Old village street

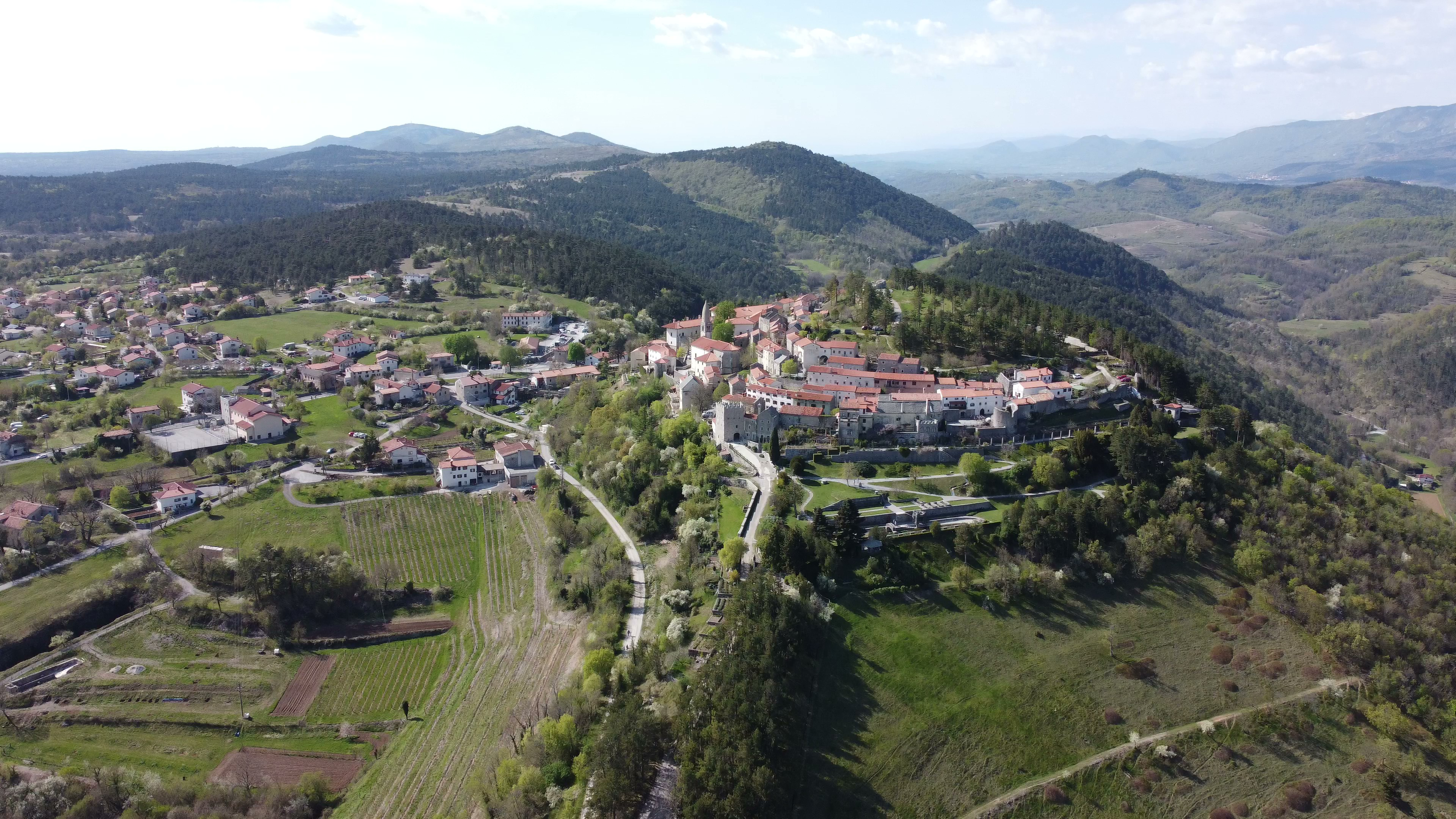
Aerial view of Štanjel
