= Kreplje =

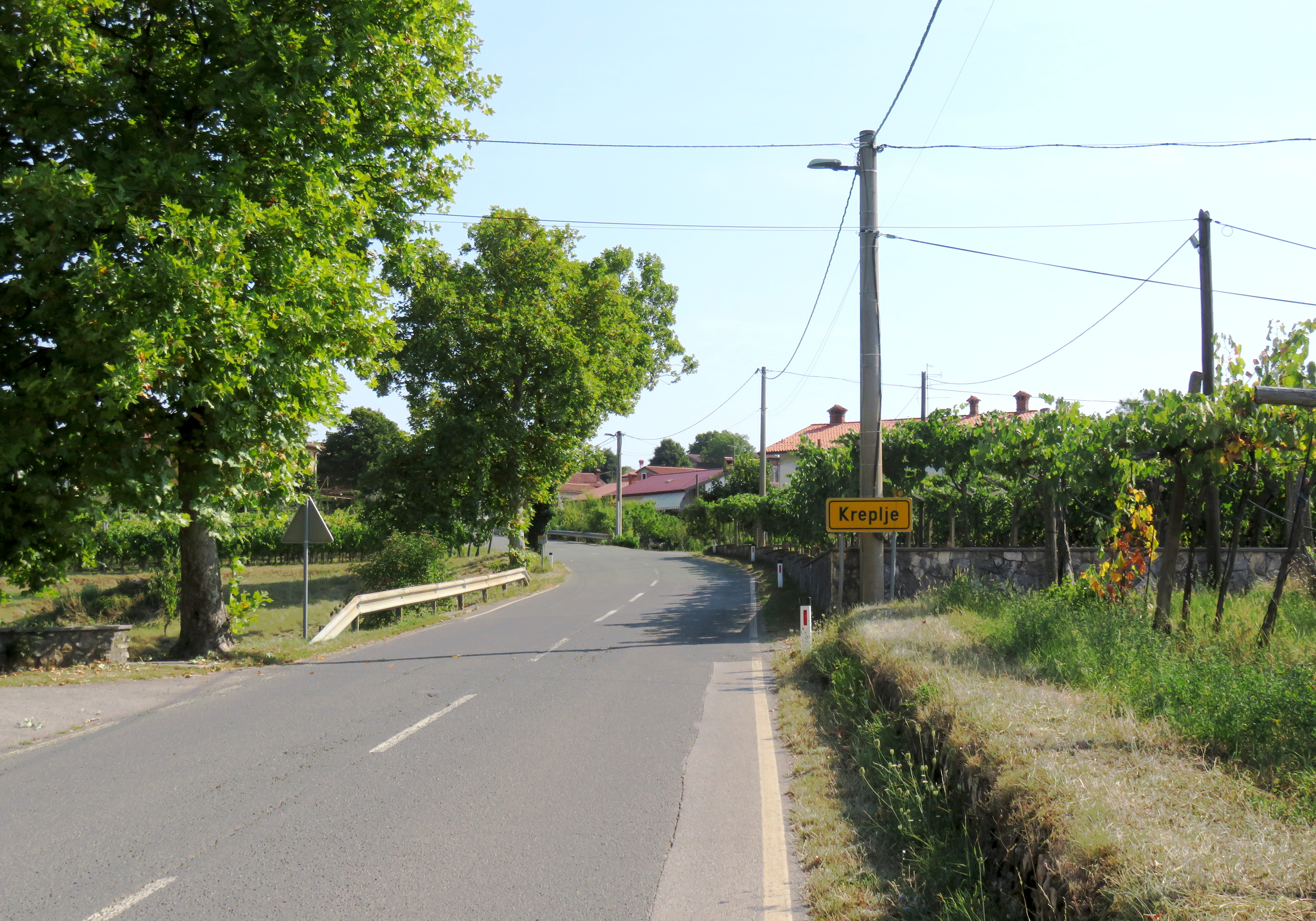

- Location in Slovenia
- Coordinates: 45°44′41.77″N 13°50′10.5″E
- Country: Slovenia
- Traditional region: Littoral
- Statistical region: Coastal–Karst
- Municipality: Sežana

Area
  - Total: 2.85 km^{2} (1.10 sq mi)
- Elevation: 300.4 m (986 ft)

Population (2002)
  - Total: 152

Kreplje (pronounced [ˈkɾeːpljɛ]; Italian: Crepegliano) is a village in the Municipality of Sežana in the Littoral region of Slovenia, close to the border with Italy.

== History ==
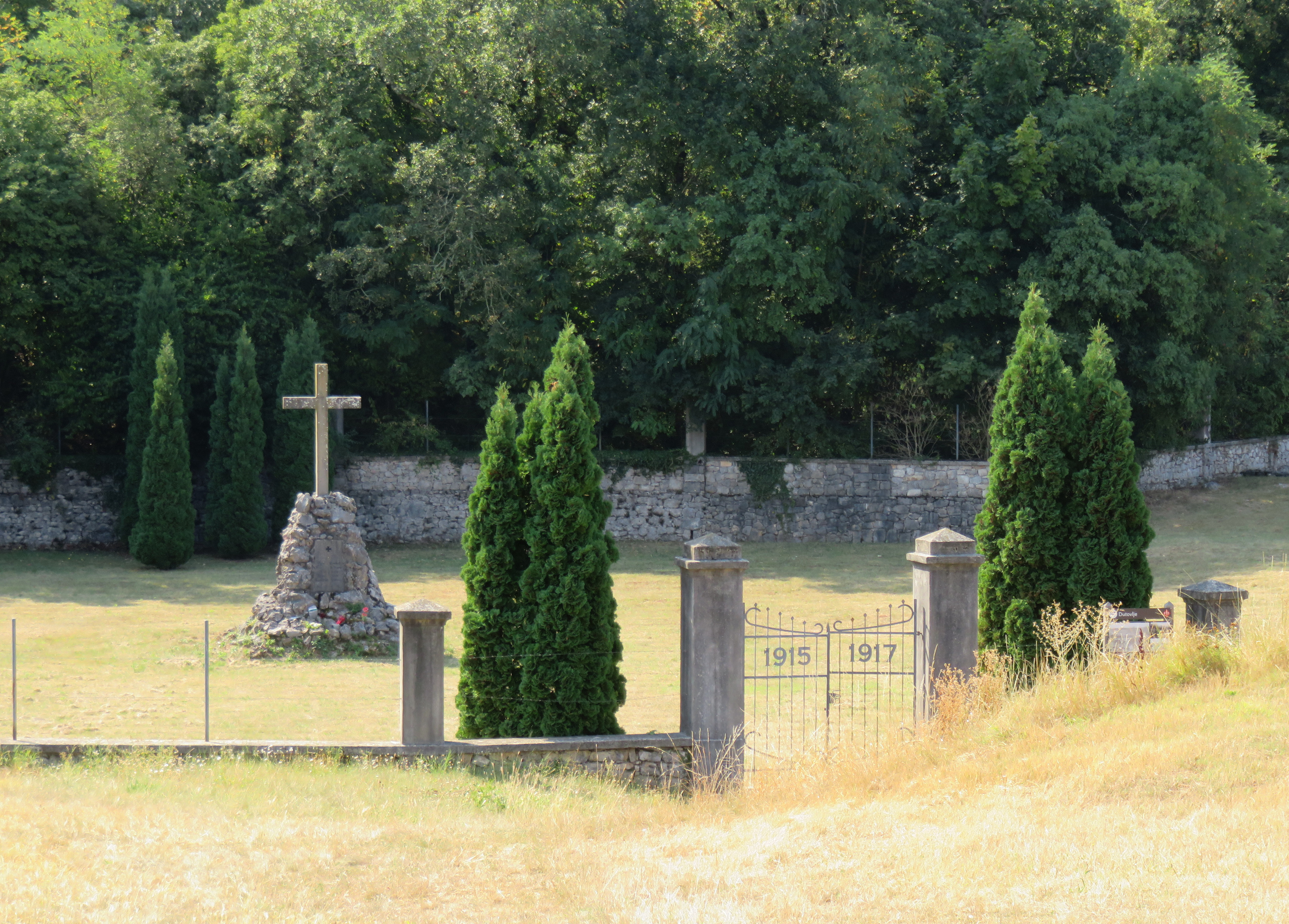
First World War cemetery

During the First World War, an Austro-Hungarian military camp was established along the rail line between Kreplje and Dutovlje. A military cemetery for victims of infectious diseases was set up on the northwest outskirts of Kreplje, and after the war the Italian authorities reinterred additional soldiers at the site as smaller cemeteries were consolidated. Official records state that there are 1,374 Austro-Hungarian soldiers buried at the cemetery.

== Church ==
The church in the settlement is dedicated to Saint Notburga and belongs to the Parish of Dutovlje.
