= Višnja Gora =

- Town
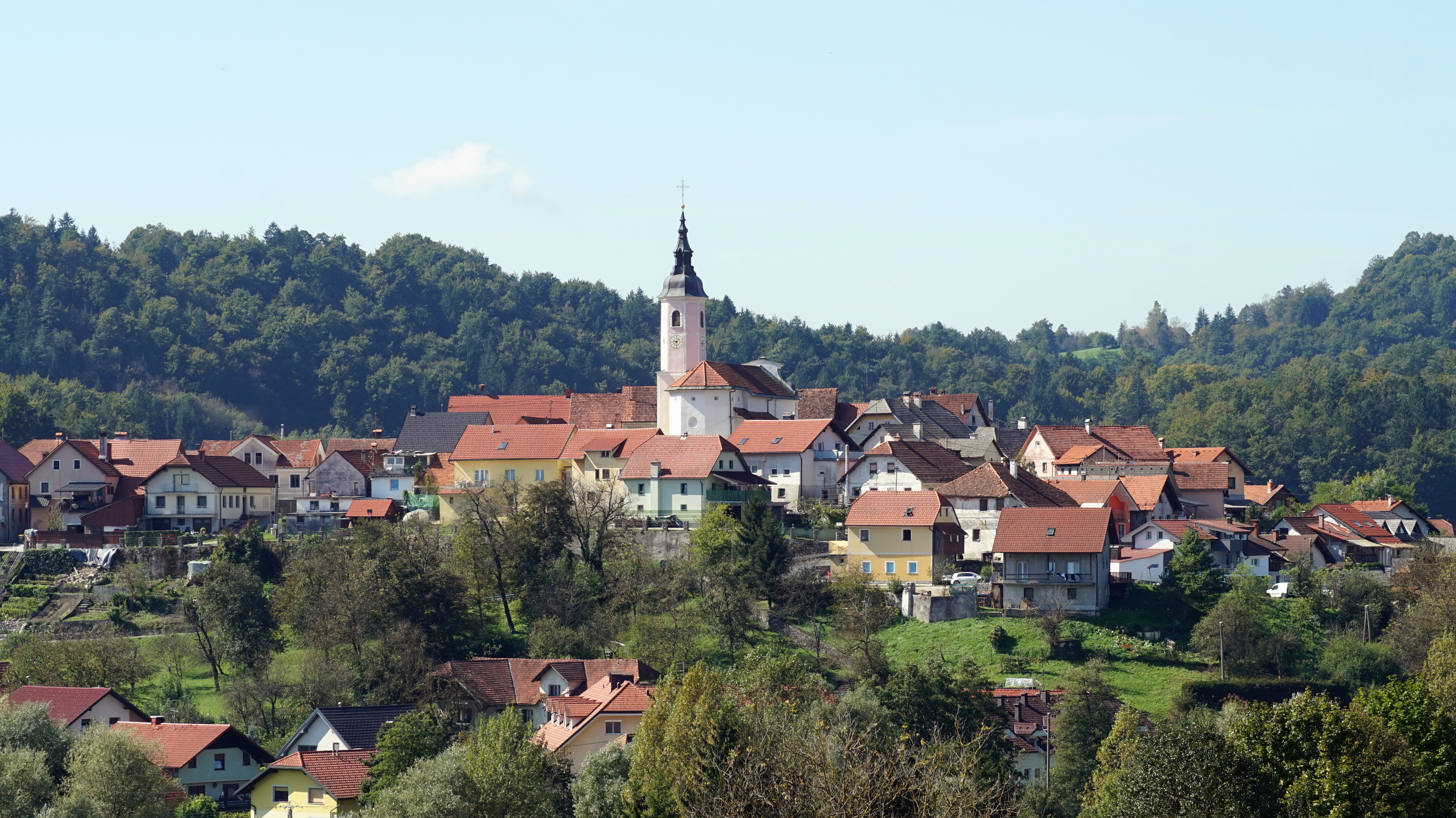
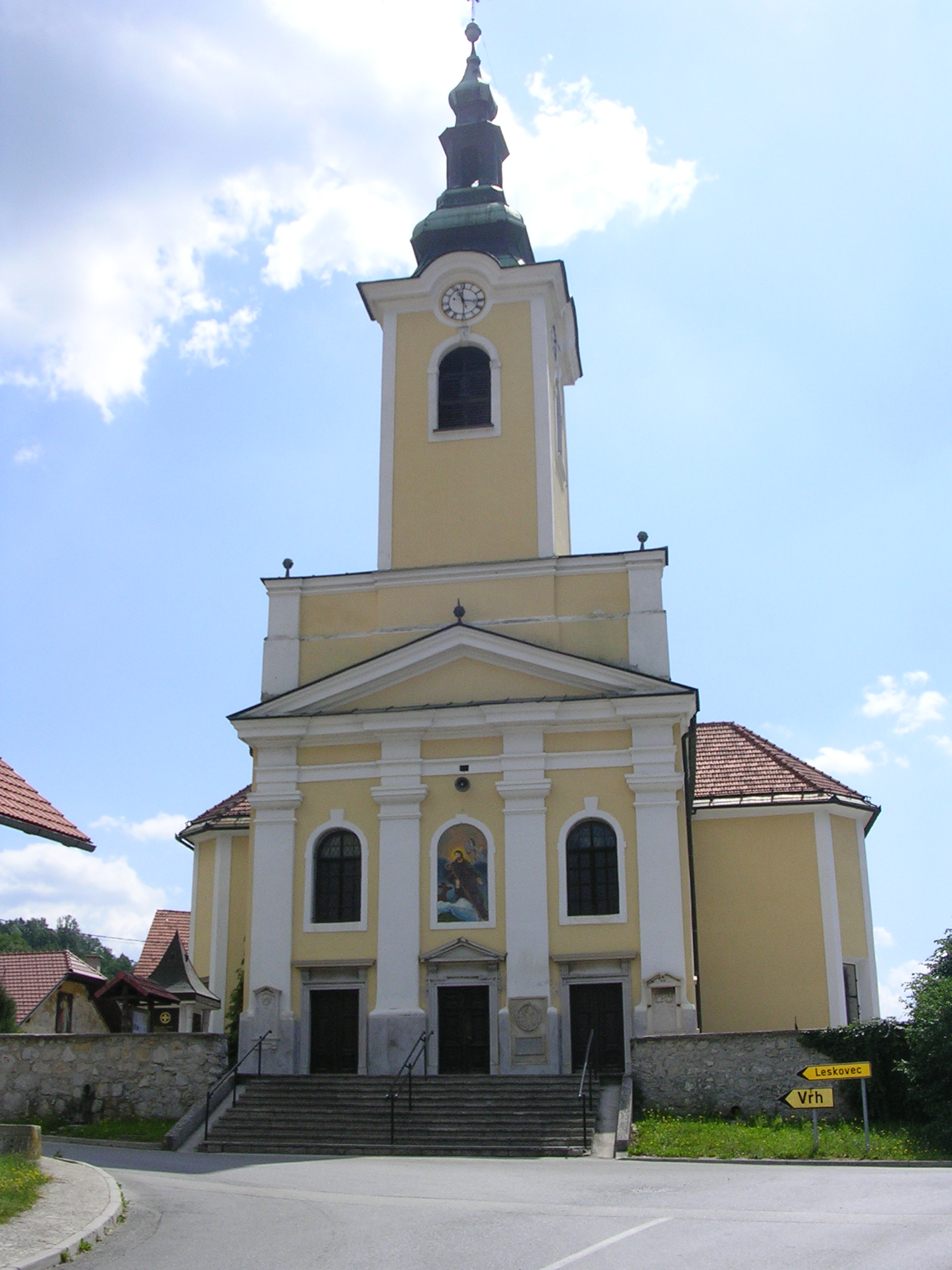
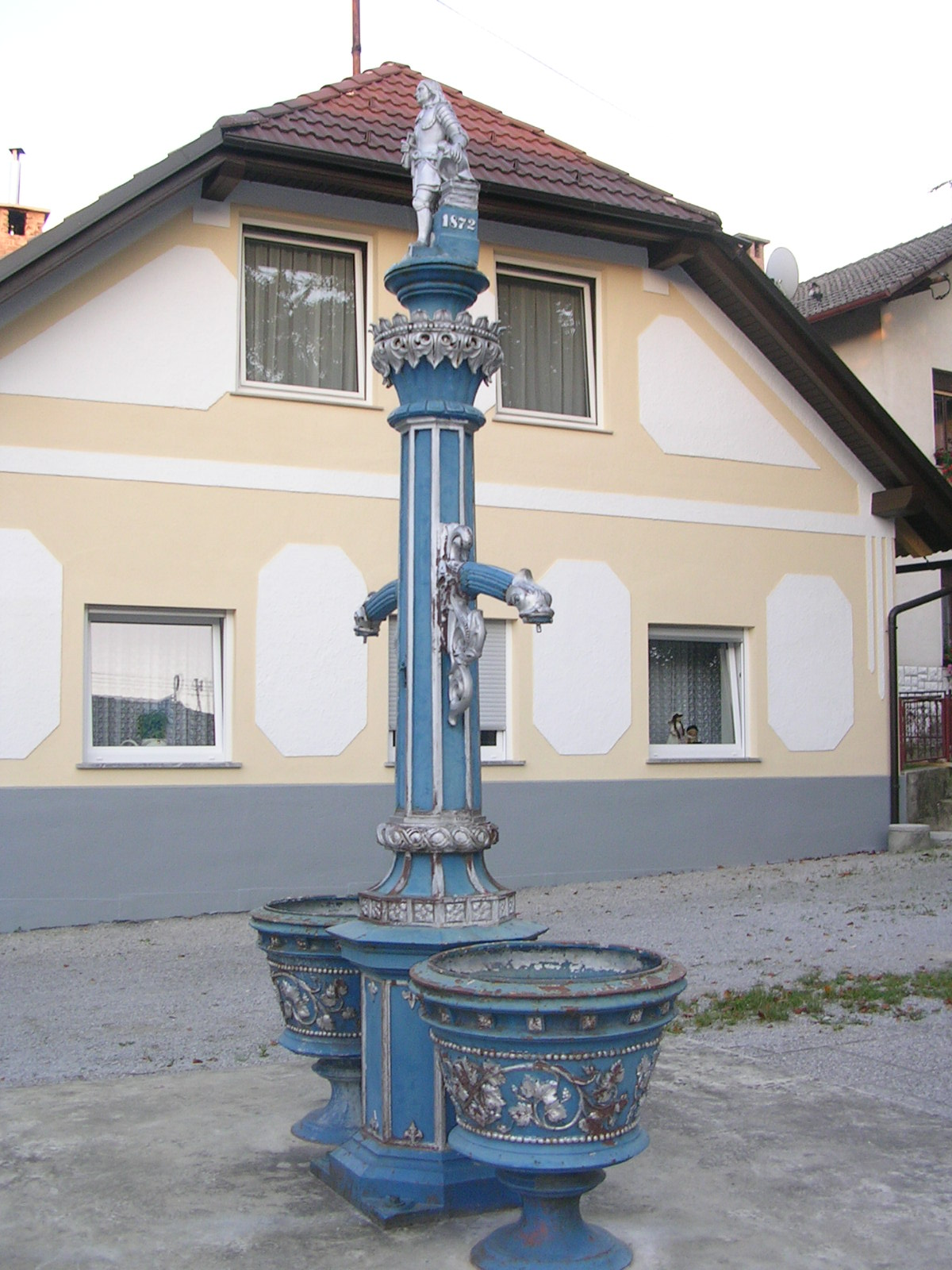
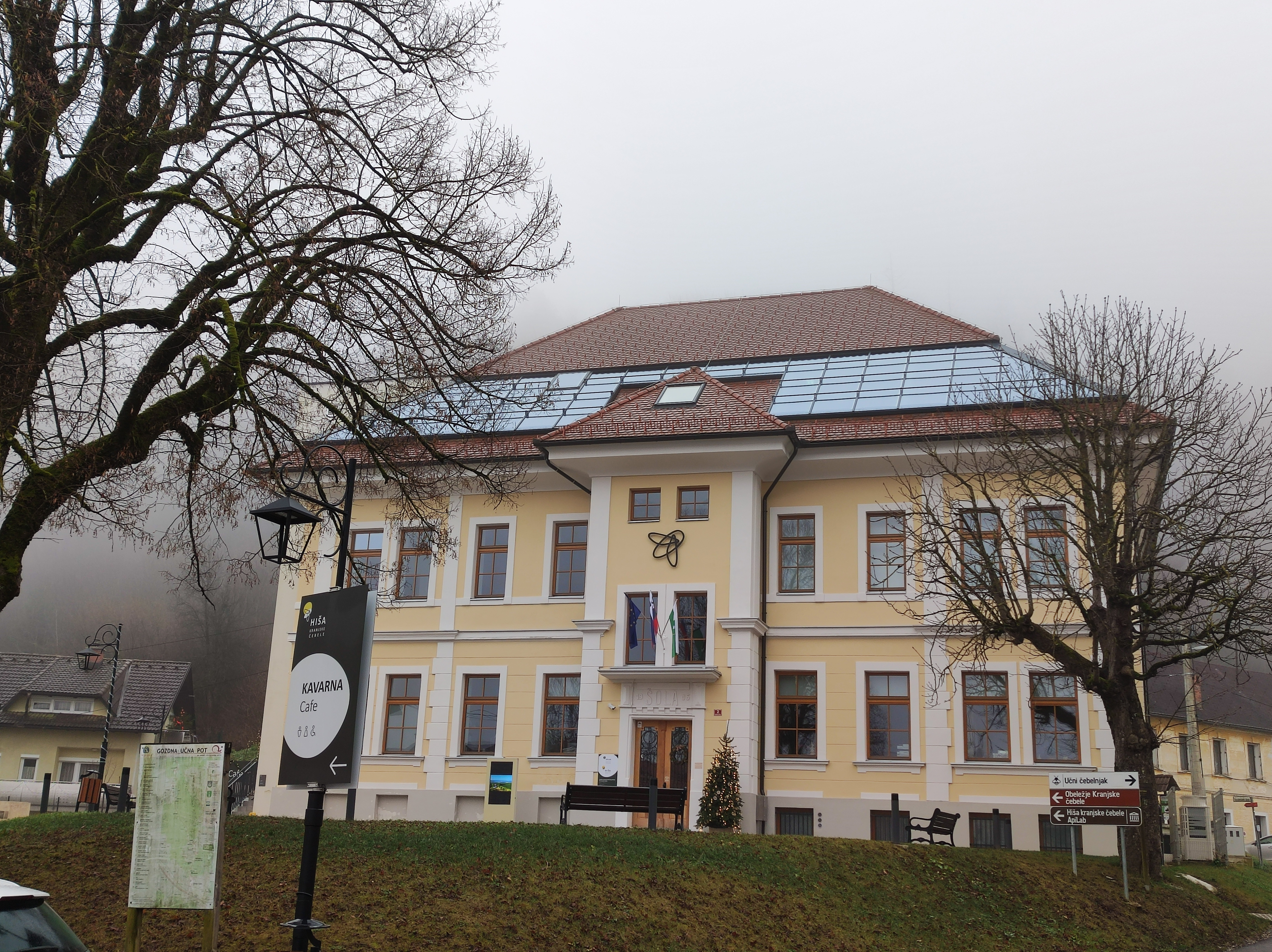
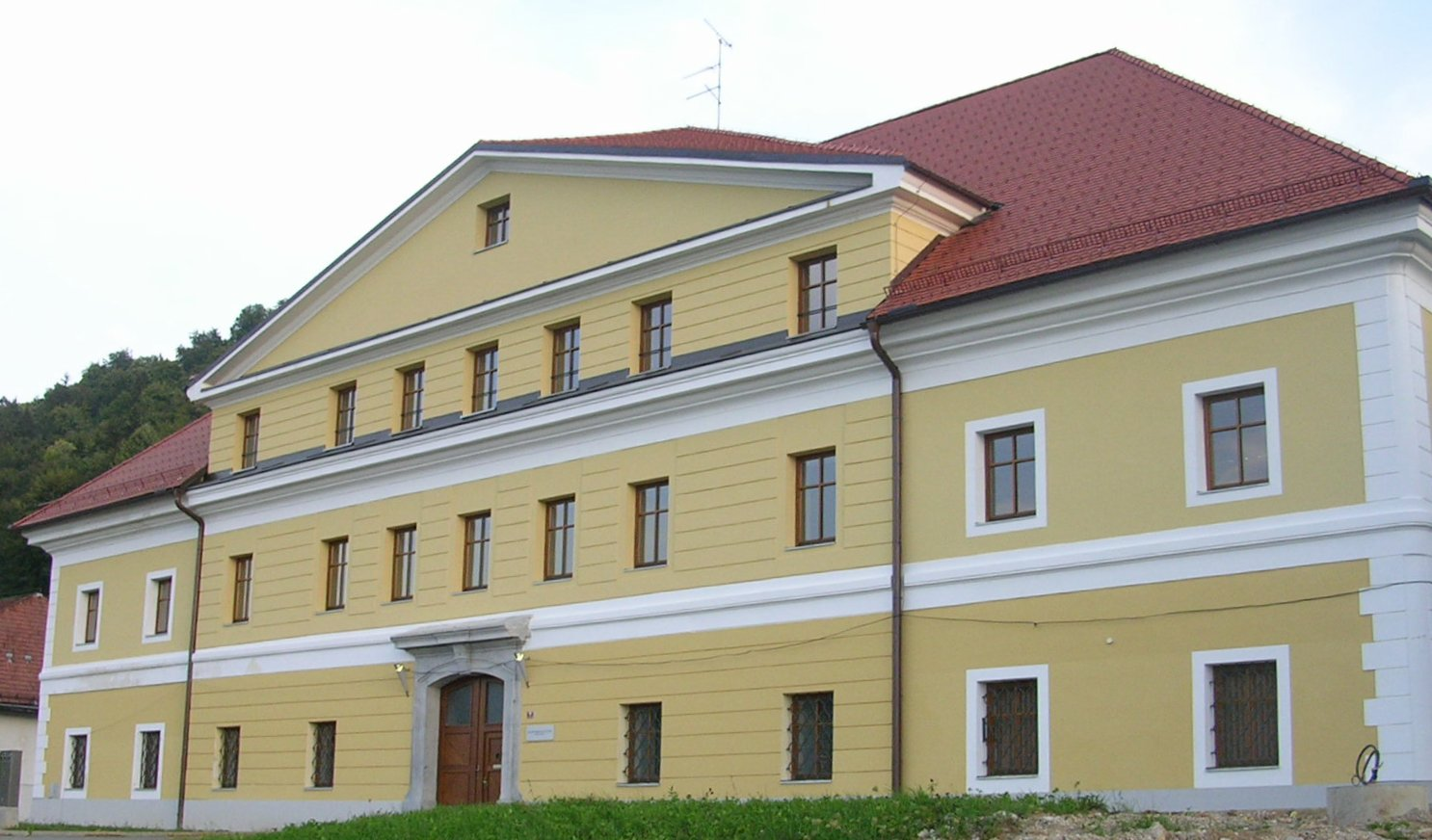
- From top, left to right: Višnja Gora from afar, St. Giles's Church, Valvasor Fountain, House of Carniolan Bee, Educational Institution

- Coat of arms
- Interactive map of Višnja Gora
- Coordinates: 45°57′28.66″N 14°44′32.03″E
- Country: Slovenia
- Traditional region: Lower Carniola
- Statistical region: Central Slovenia
- Municipality: Ivančna Gorica
- Town: 9 June 1478

Population (2002)
  - Total: 813
- Post code: SI-1294
- Area code: 01
- Website: Official website
- Source: Statistical Office of the Republic of Slovenia, census of 2002.

Višnja Gora (pronounced [ˈʋìːʃnja ˈɡɔ̀ːɾa]; German: Weixelburg, also Weichselburg, Weichselberg) is a town in the Municipality of Ivančna Gorica in central Slovenia. It is one of the best-preserved medieval towns in Slovenia. The area is part of the historical region of Lower Carniola. The municipality is now included in the Central Slovenia Statistical Region. It includes the hamlets of Žabjek, Na Štacjonu, and Grintavec, as well as the former hamlet of Suhi Malen (German: Weixelbach).

== Geography ==
The town is located in the Višnjica Valley 20 kilometers (12 mi) southeast of Ljubljana just south of the A2 Slovenian motorway. Nearby is the Kosca Valley, with the highest waterfall on a travertine foundation in Slovenia. Regular long-distance bus and rail lines connect Višnja Gora to Ivančna Gorica and Ljubljana.

== History ==
Višnja Gora was granted town rights in 1478. In the same period, a coat of arms showing a masonry wall with doors and two roofed towers was adopted. The snail representing a local legend was added later. The citizens of the town were given a golden snail shell for nursing the Venetian doge's son wounded in the Battle of Sisak (1593) by his relatives. The golden shell has since been lost, but the legend remains. During the Second World War, Višnja Gora was bombarded by German forces on 22 September 1943. At the end of October 1943, Partisan forces burned Turn Castle, the courthouse, and the school in the town.

Historical population
Year	1948	1953	1961	1971	1981	1991	2002	2011	2021
Pop.	406	537	624	560	655	754	813	1,000	1,135
±%	—	+32.3%	+16.2%	−10.3%	+17.0%	+15.1%	+7.8%	+23.0%	+13.5%
Population size may be affected by changes in administrative divisions.

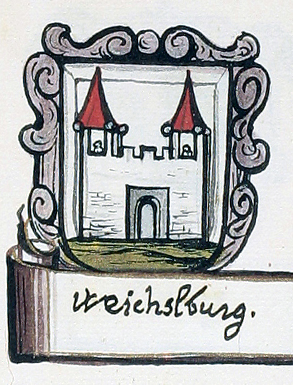
Valvasor's depiction of Višnja Gora's coat of arms

== Castles ==
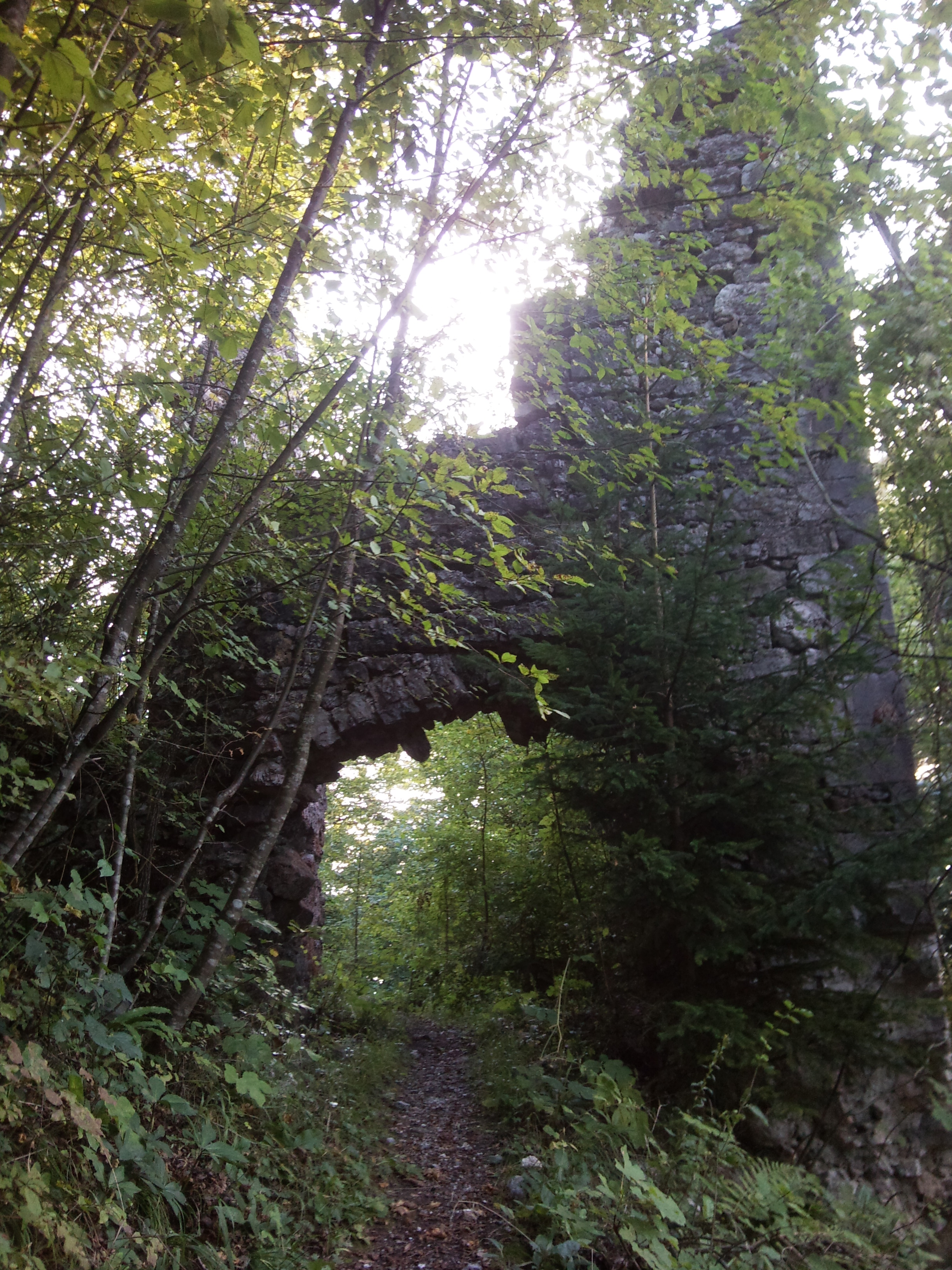
Old Castle

The old centre is built on a hill (384 m) under the ruins of Višnja Gora Castle (Slovene: Višnjegorski grad), generally known as Old Castle (Slovene: Stari grad), once home of the Višnja Gora knights. A second castle, Turn Castle (German: Weixelbach), stood west of the town center. It was also later known as the Codelli Manor (Slovene: Codellijeva graščina) and was burned by the Partisans in October 1943.

== Recreation ==
The 12 km Jurčič Trail is named after Josip Jurčič, author of the first Slovene novel, Deseti brat, who attended primary school in Višnja Gora. Part of the trail has been recently turned into a forest trail known as Po poteh višnjanskega polža (The Višnja Gora Snail Trail).

== Notable people ==
Notable people that were born or lived Višnja Gora include:

- Josip Jurčič (1844–1881), author
- Ive Krevs (1912–1990), Yugoslav Olympic athlete
- Pasqual Skerbinz (1780–1824), religious writer
- Johannes Tschandek (1581–1624), Jesuit priest and author of the first Catholic compendium of the Gospels Evangelia inu lystuvi (Gospels and Epistles), 1612

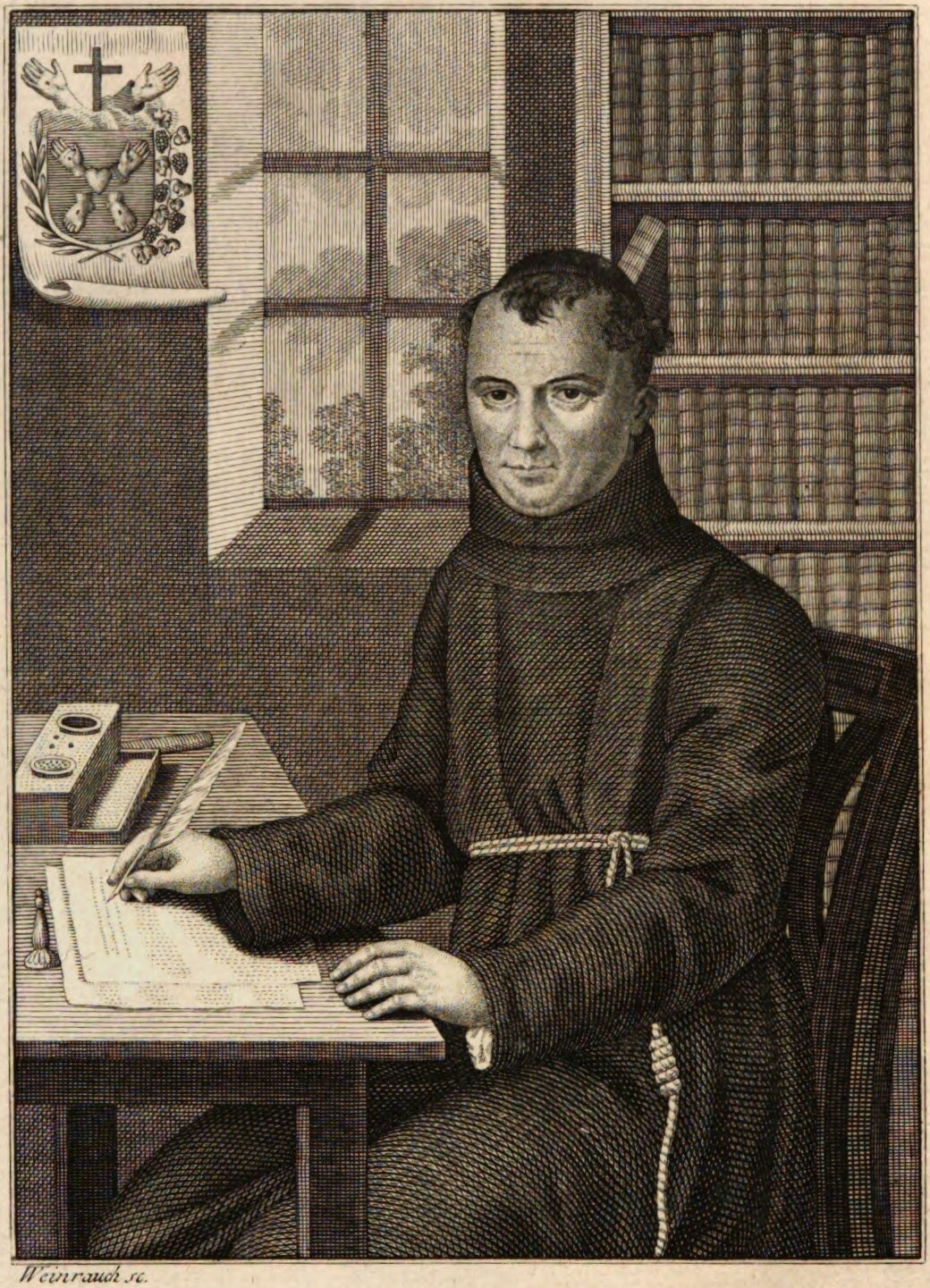
Pasqual Skerbinz

== Gallery ==
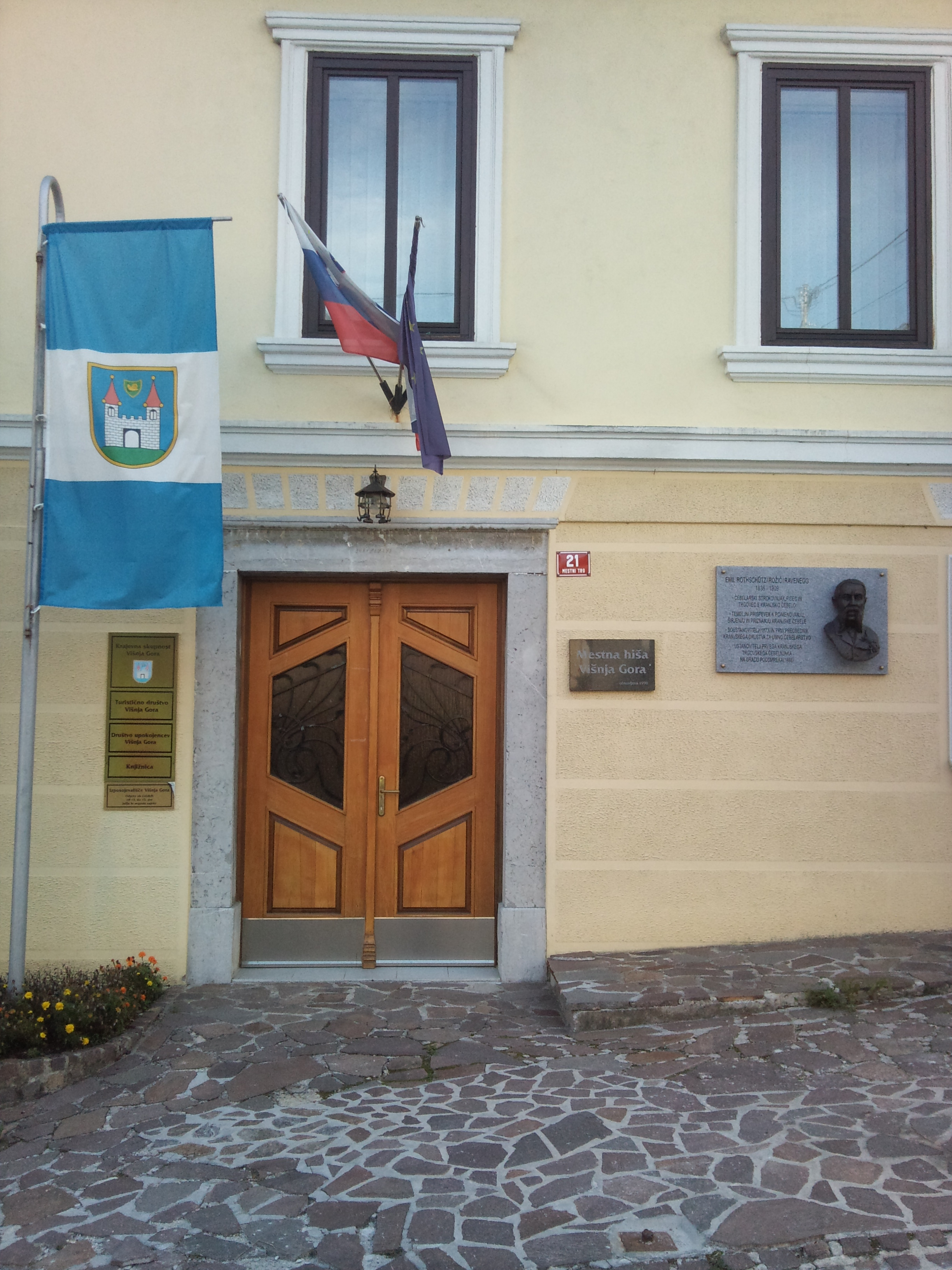
Town hall

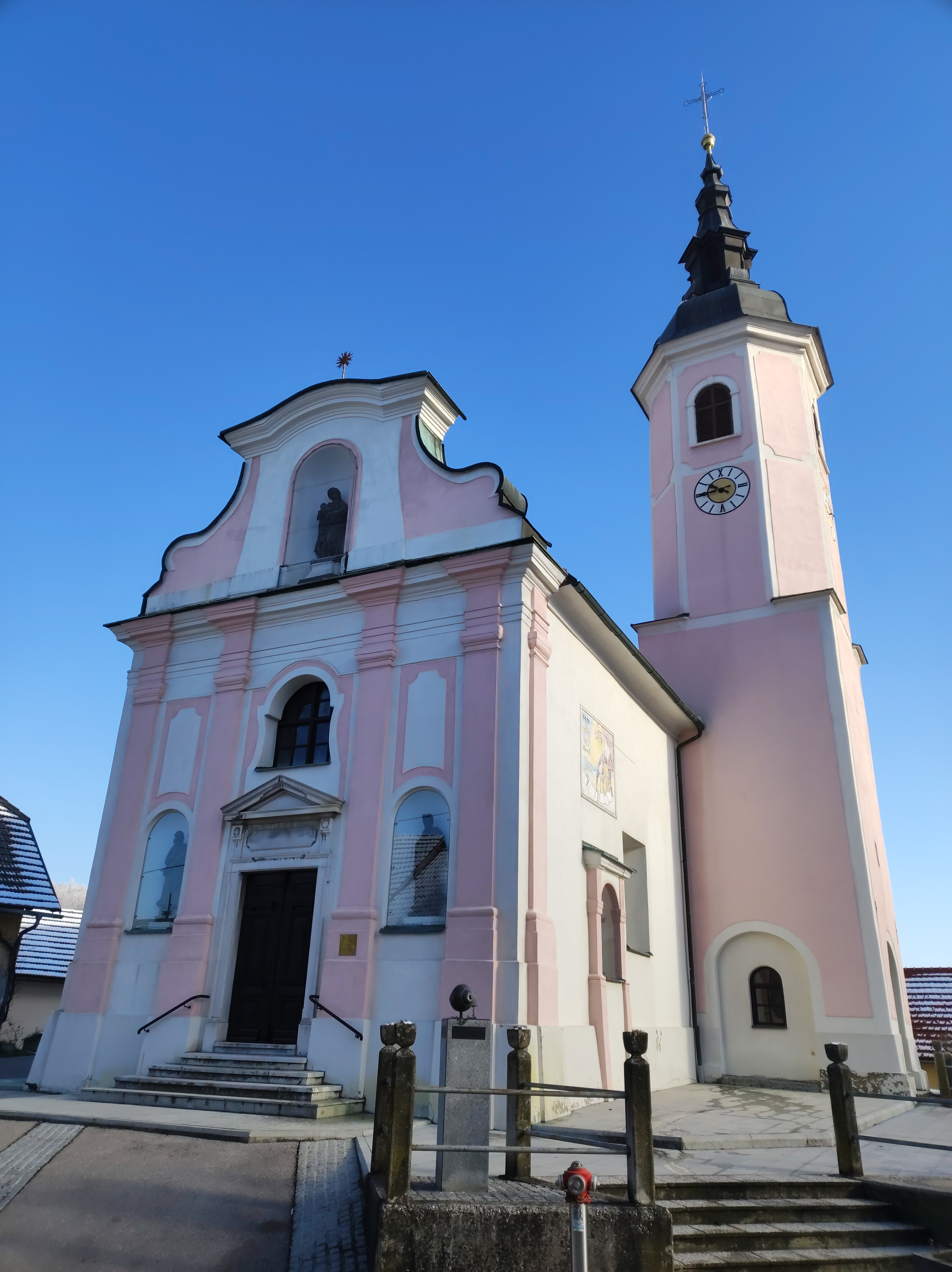
St. Anne's Church

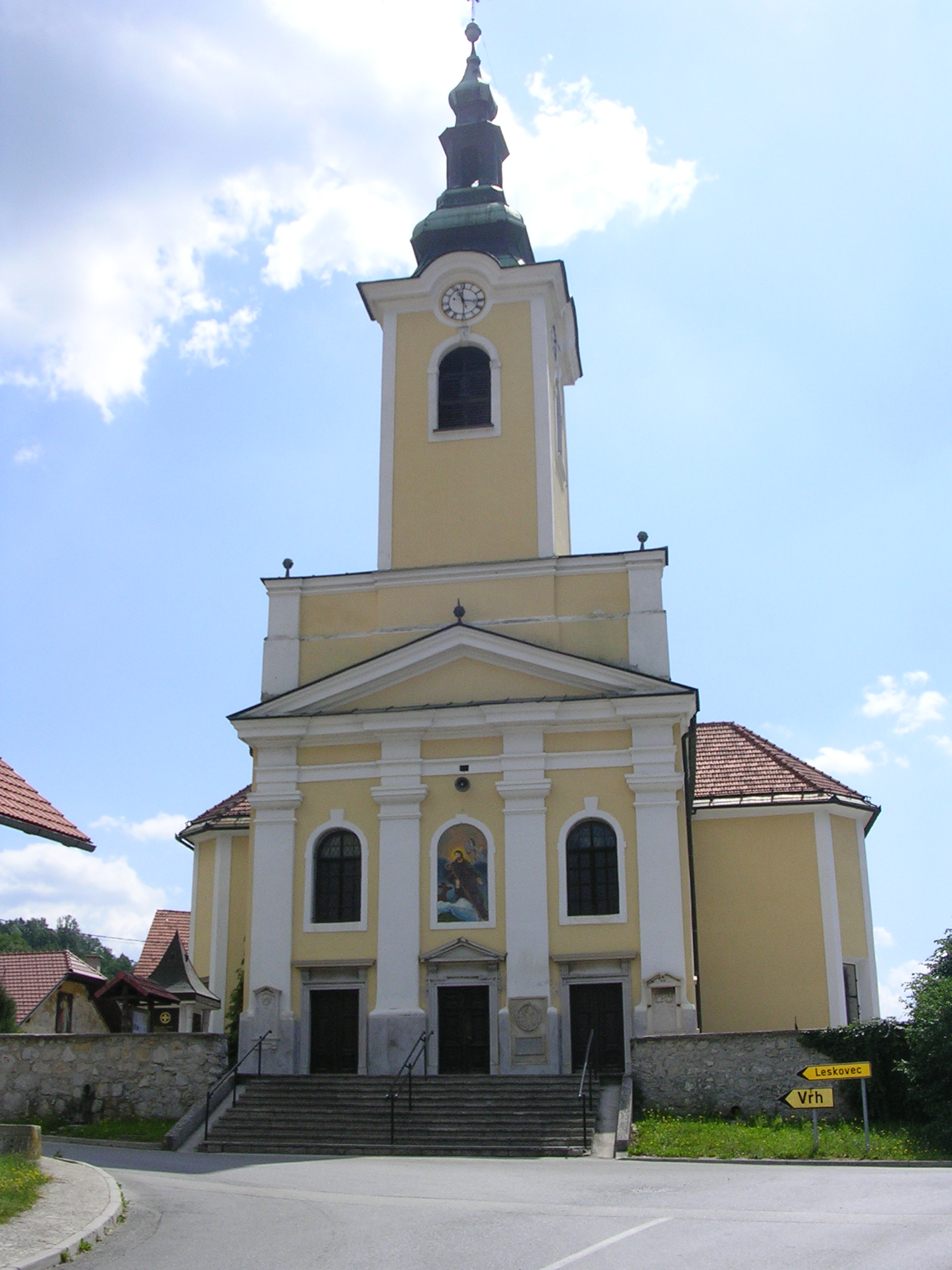
St. Giles's Church

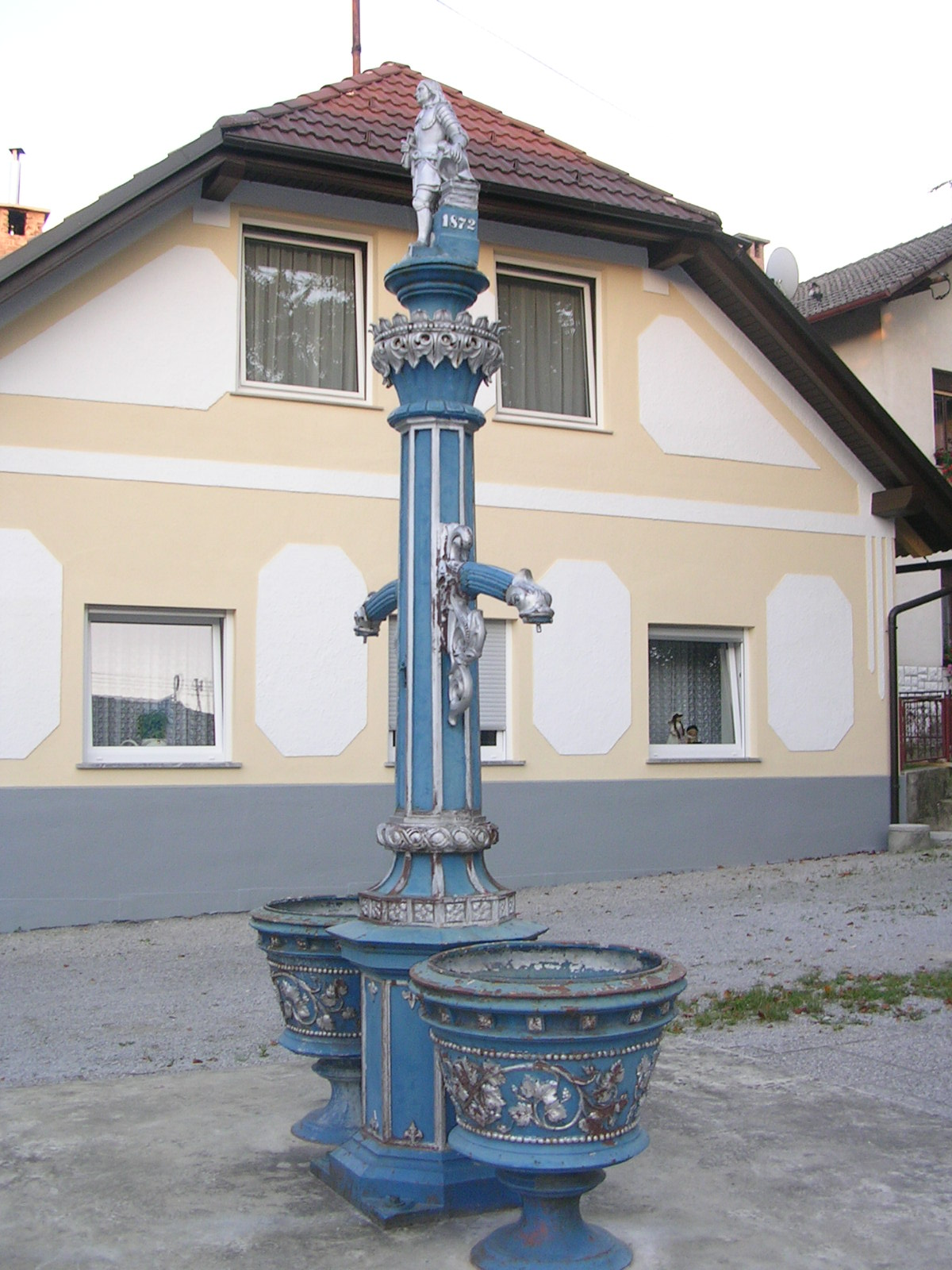
Valvasor's fountain
