= Thomas Chrön =

17th-century Catholic bishop

His Excellency Thomas Chrön
- Prince-Bishop of Ljubljana
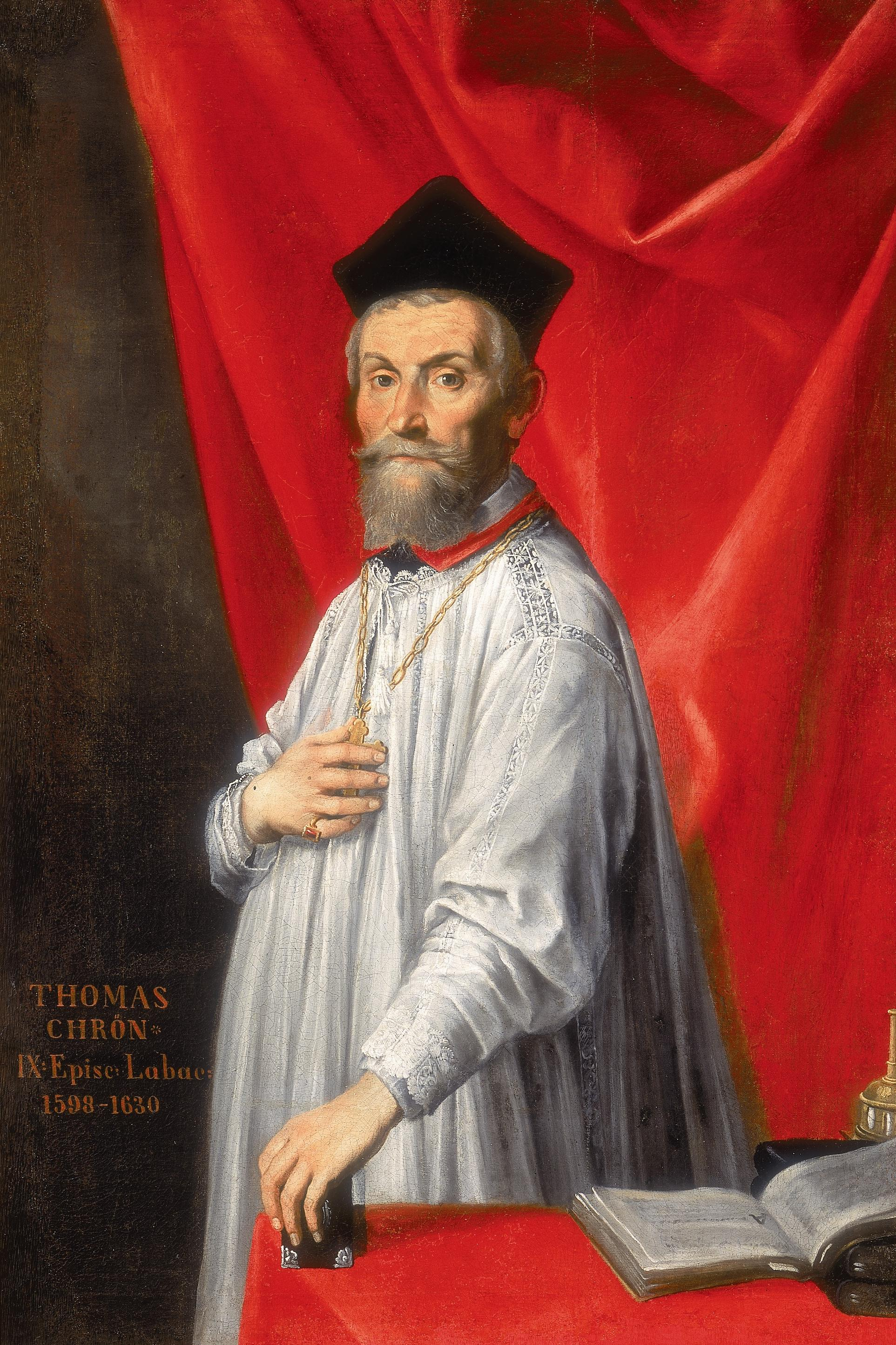
- Diocese: Ljubljana
- Installed: 1597
- Term ended: 1630
- Predecessor: Johann Tautscher
- Successor: Rinaldo Scarlichi

Orders
- Ordination: 1588

Personal details
- Born: November 13, 1560 Ljubljana
- Died: February 10, 1630 (aged 69) Gornji Grad

Thomas Chrön (Slovenized: Tomaž Hren; November 13, 1560 – February 10, 1630) was a Carniolan Roman Catholic priest, bishop of Ljubljana, and patron of the arts.

== Life and work ==
Chrön was born in Ljubljana. In 1573 he enrolled in the Jesuit school in Graz. He was ordained in 1588, when he was also appointed to the canon's position formerly held by Primož Trubar. In 1597 he was appointed bishop of Ljubljana, and the appointment was confirmed in 1599. He was the leading force behind the Counter-Reformation in Carniola, and Protestantism was suppressed in his diocese between 1600 and 1603. However, Jurij Dalmatin's Bible translation was retained and he received papal permission to use it, thereby preserving its linguistic and literary tradition. From 1614 to 1621 he served as the deputy provincial sovereign.

Chrön wanted to establish a press in Ljubljana; he made it possible for Johannes Tschandek (Slovenized: Janez Čandek or Čandik) to print the gospels and epistles (Evangelia inu listuvi, 1613), and he copyedited the text himself, which was based on translations by Trubar and Dalmatin. He established the Collegium Marianum in Gornji Grad for the education of clergy. Chrön also supported liturgical music: he commissioned a new organ in Gornji Grad.

Chrön died in Gornji Grad, where he was also buried.

The Trieste prison whose official name is Casa Circondariale "Ernesto Mari" is colloquially known as Coroneo and takes its name from the via del Coroneo, the street it is located on, which in turn derives from the Italianized version of Bishop Chrön's last name. Coroneo, who owned vast properties in that area in the 17th century.

The Slovenized spelling of his name Tomash Hren is found as early as 1832, Tomaž Kren by 1848, Tomaž Hren by 1849, Tomaž Chrön by 1854, and Tomaž Chroen by 1907.
