= Johannes Tschandek =

Carniolan priest (c. 1581–1624)

- Born: c. 1581; Višnja Gora, Duchy of Carniola (now Slovenia)
- Died: October 8, 1624; Graz, Duchy of Styria (now Austria)
- Other names: Ioannis Tschandeck, Joannes Tschandik, Janes Zhandik, Johann Tschandick, Ioannis Tsandeck, loannes Tsandeck, Ioannes Tsandek, Jean Tschandik, Jean Candik, Jean Tsandek, Janez Čandek, Janez Čandik
- Occupation: Religious writer
- Movement: Lutheranism

Johannes Tschandek (Slovenized: Janez Čandek or Janez Čandik, also attested under several other names, c. 1581 – October 8, 1624) was a Carniolan priest, Jesuit, and religious writer.

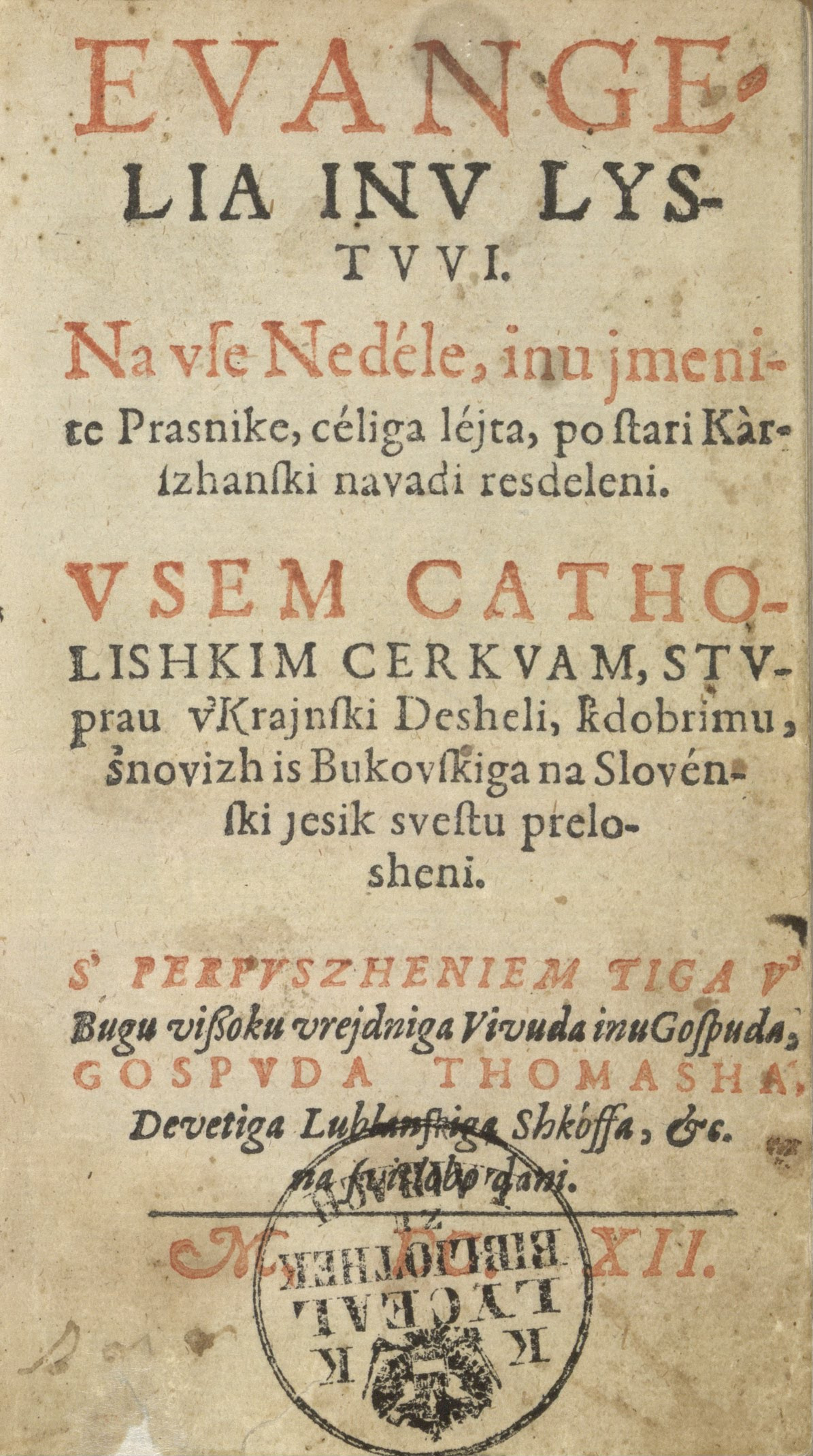
Evangelia inu lystuvi (Gospels and Epistles), 1612, prepared by Tschandek

Tschandek was born in Višnja Gora and attended school in Ljubljana. He became a Jesuit in 1600 and taught at the Jesuit lyceum in Ljubljana. In 1610 he relocated to Graz, where he studied theology until 1612. After completing his studies, he primarily worked in Klagenfurt, Graz, and Ljubljana.

Although Lutheranism had mostly been eradicated among the Slovenes by Tschandek's time, the publications created by the Slovene Protestants had nonetheless left an awareness of the need to instruct people in their vernacular language.

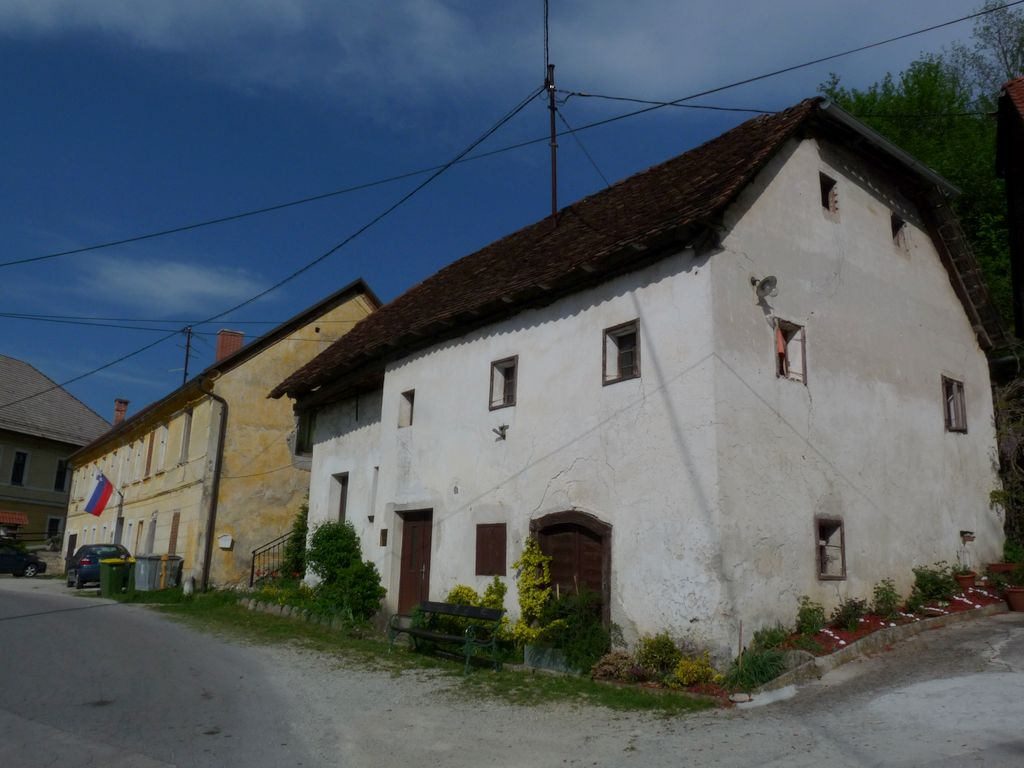
Tschandek's birthplace in Višnja Gora

The most important religious figure of this era in Slovenian territory was the bishop of Ljubljana, Thomas Chrön. As bishop, he participated in destroying Protestant publications, razing their churches, and expelling Protestants, as well as having their corpses exhumed. Chrön was unable to realize his plan to publish a catechism, a prayer book, and a hymnal, and to establish a press, but he did succeed in having 3,000 copies of the book Evangelia inu lystuvi (Gospels and Epistles) published at his expense in Graz in 1613. This was based on Jurij Dalmatin's Bible translation, but with expressions of foreign origin replaced with Slovene expressions. The work continued the Protestant linguistic heritage in Slovenian territory, and it was later reprinted eight times, always using the language of the Protestant text. In 1615, a Slovene translation of Peter Canisius's Catechismus minor was published in Augsburg (titled Catechiſmus Petri Caniſij Soc. Iesv Th. Skusi malane Figure napréj poſtavlen 'The Little Catechism of Peter Canisius SJ Presented with Illustrations'). Both of these publications were prepared by Tschandek. Tschandek was one of the first Slovenian Catholic writers to write books in Slovene for Slovene priests.
