= Dutovlje =

- Village
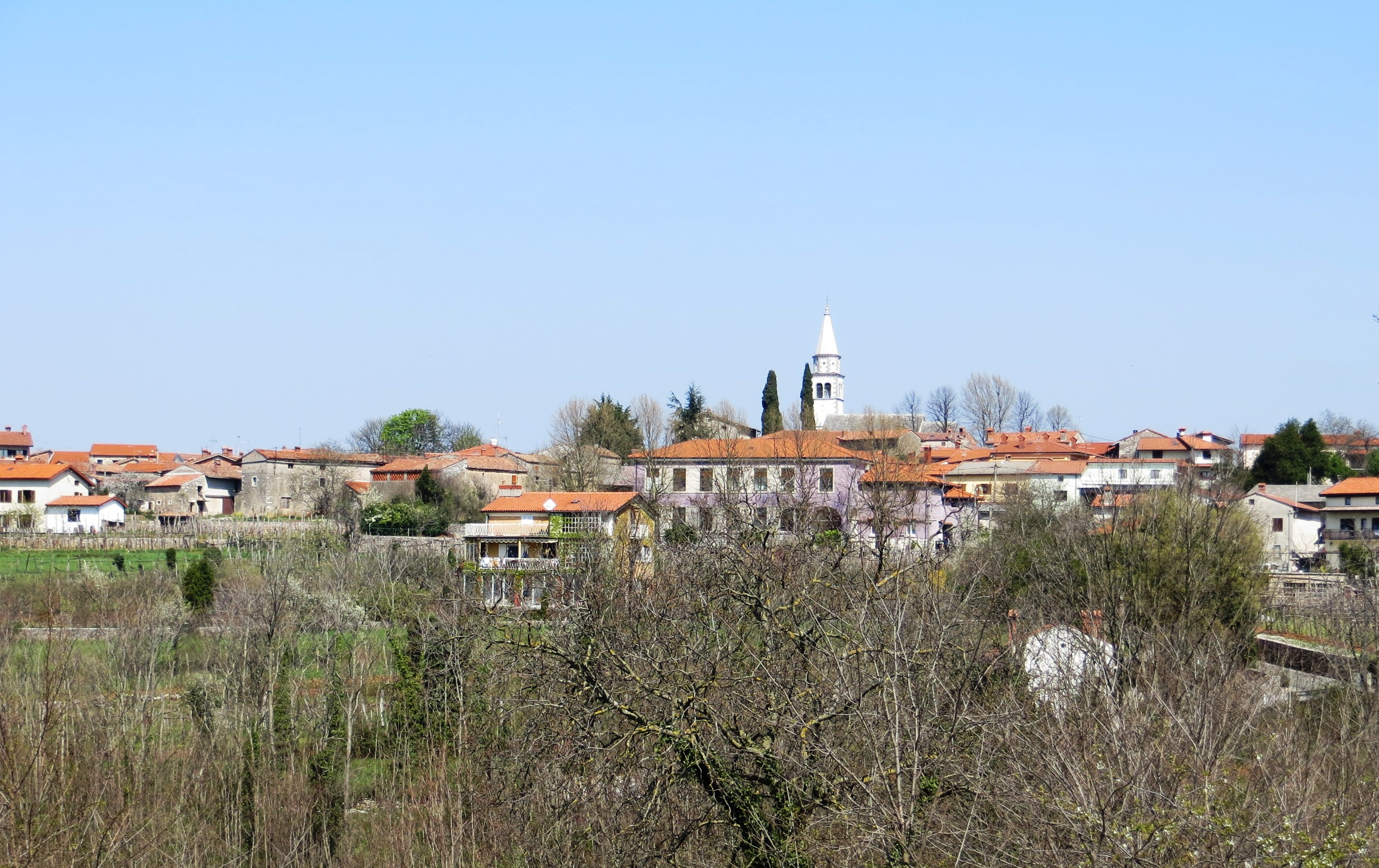

- Location in Slovenia
- Coordinates: 45°45′21.15″N 13°49′56.73″E
- Country: Slovenia
- Traditional region: Littoral
- Statistical region: Coastal–Karst
- Municipality: Sežana

Area
  - Total: 8.54 km^{2} (3.30 sq mi)
- Elevation: 313.2 m (1,028 ft)

Population (2002)
  - Total: 517

Dutovlje (pronounced [ˈduːtɔu̯ljɛ]; Italian: Duttogliano) is a settlement in the Municipality of Sežana in the Littoral region of Slovenia close to the border with Italy.

== Name ==
Dutovlje was attested in written sources in 1281 as Dietemdorf (and as Dietindorf in 1284, de Dotoglan and de Dothoglan in 1300, Iuris de Dotolan in 1316–17, de Doutolan in 1317, and Dyetendorf in 1370). The Slovene name is derived from the plural demonym *Dutovľane, created from the place name Dutovo (selo) 'Duto's (village)', referring to an early inhabitant of the place. The place name thus literally means 'residents of Duto's village'.

== Church ==
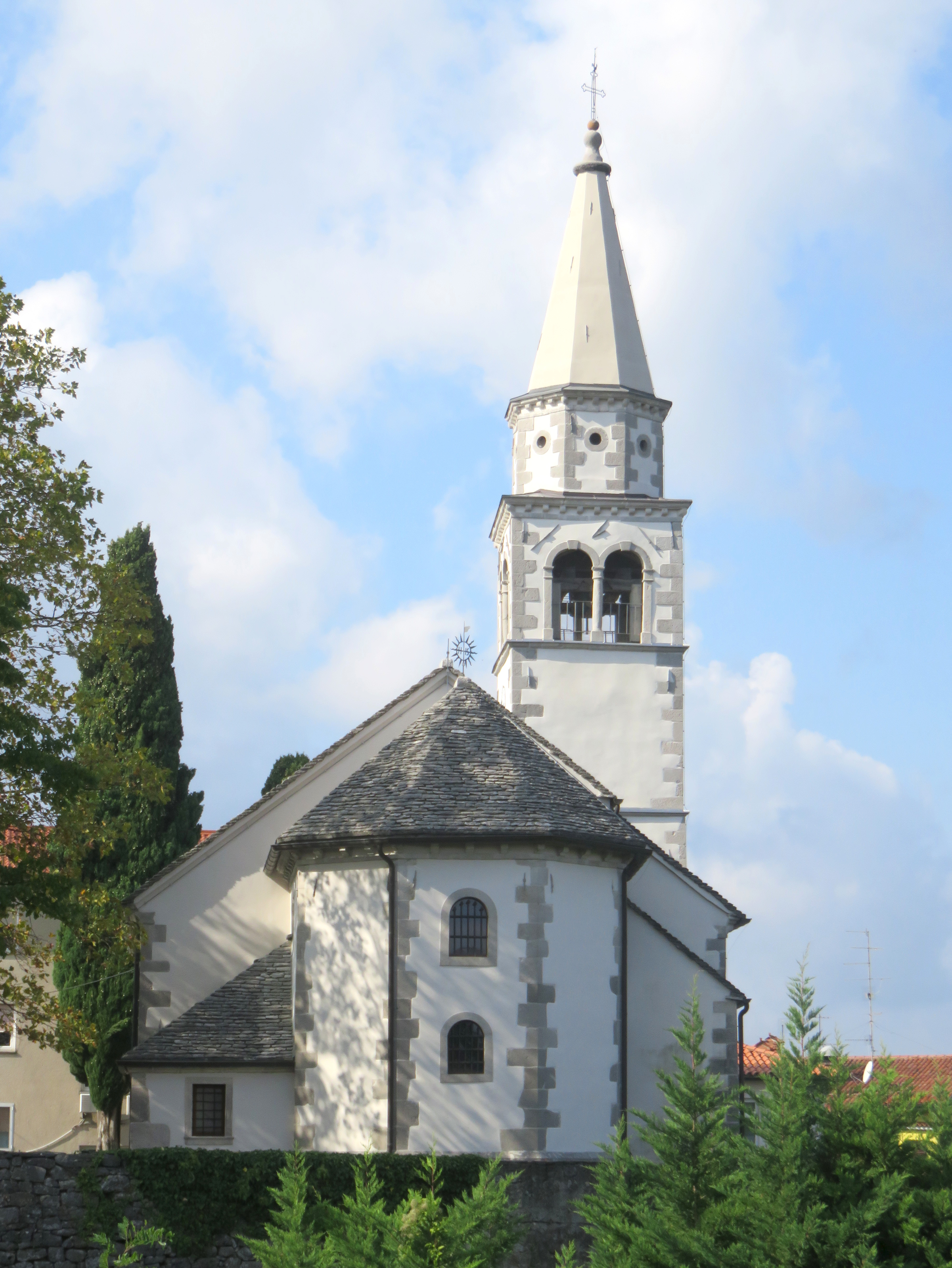
Saint George's Church

The parish church in the settlement is dedicated to Saint George and belongs to the Diocese of Koper.

== Notable people ==
Notable people that were born or lived in Dutovlje include the following:

- Danilo Žerjal (1919–1984), athlete

== Gallery ==
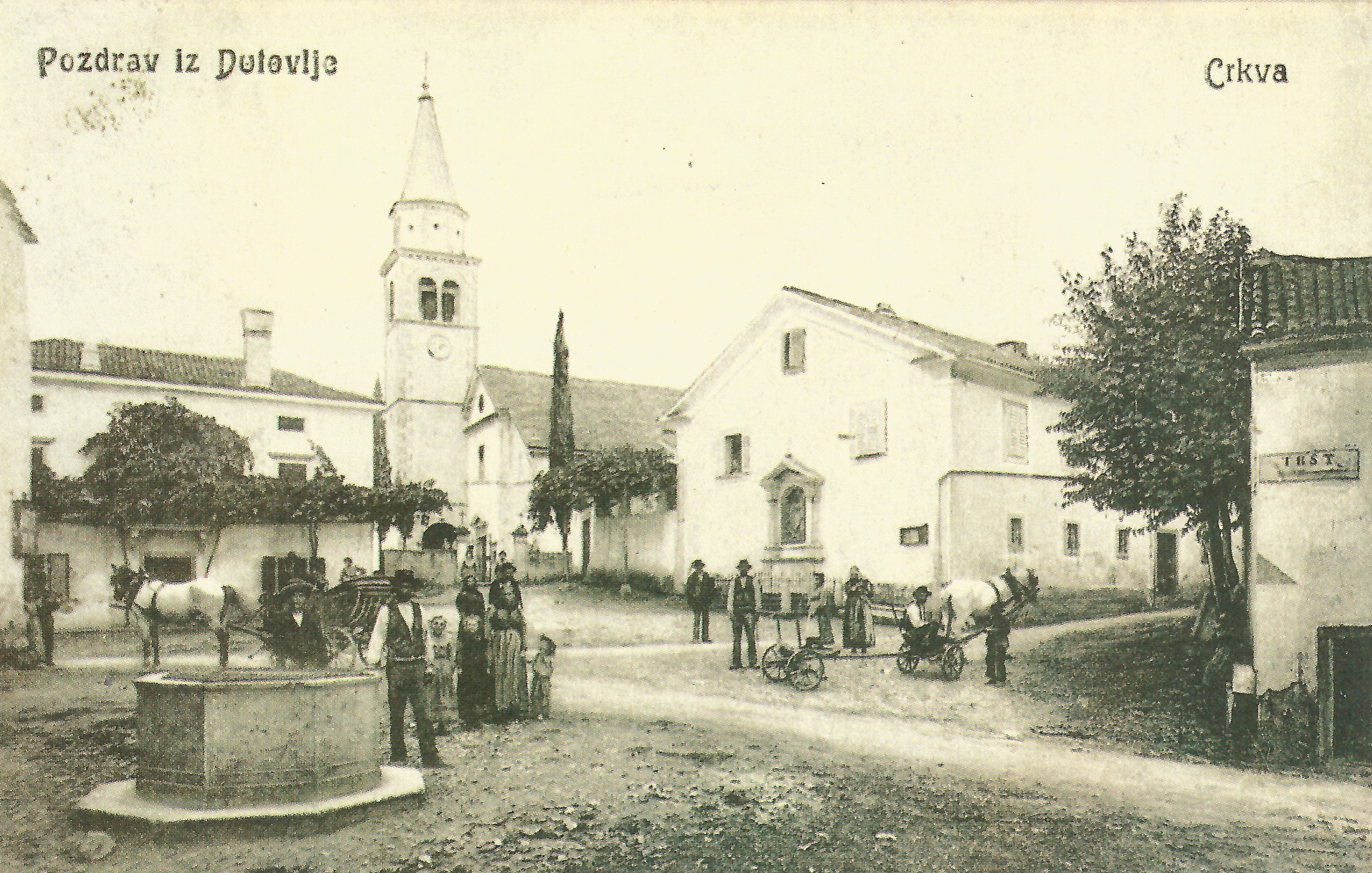
1909 postcard of Dutovlje

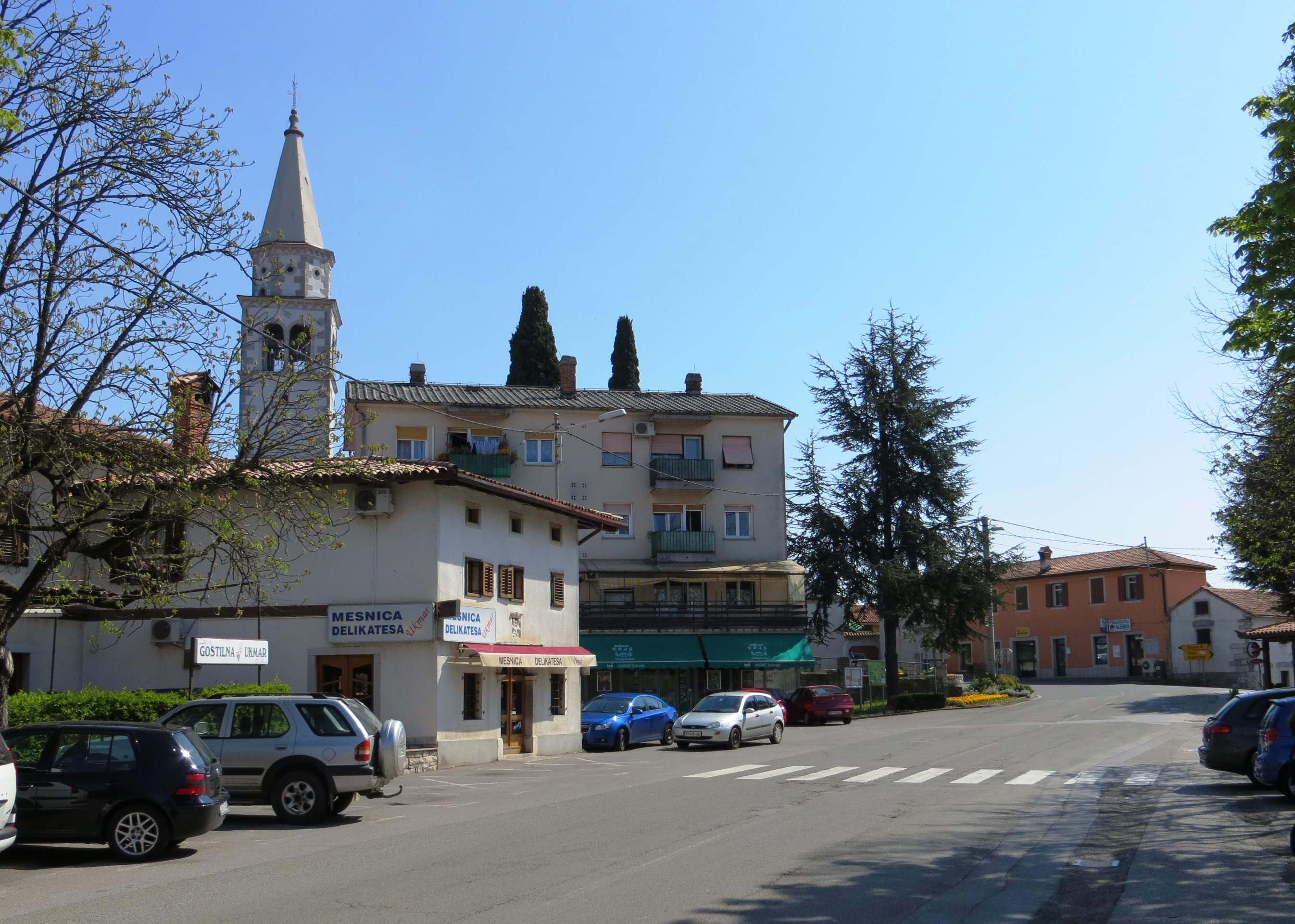
Central square in Dutovlje

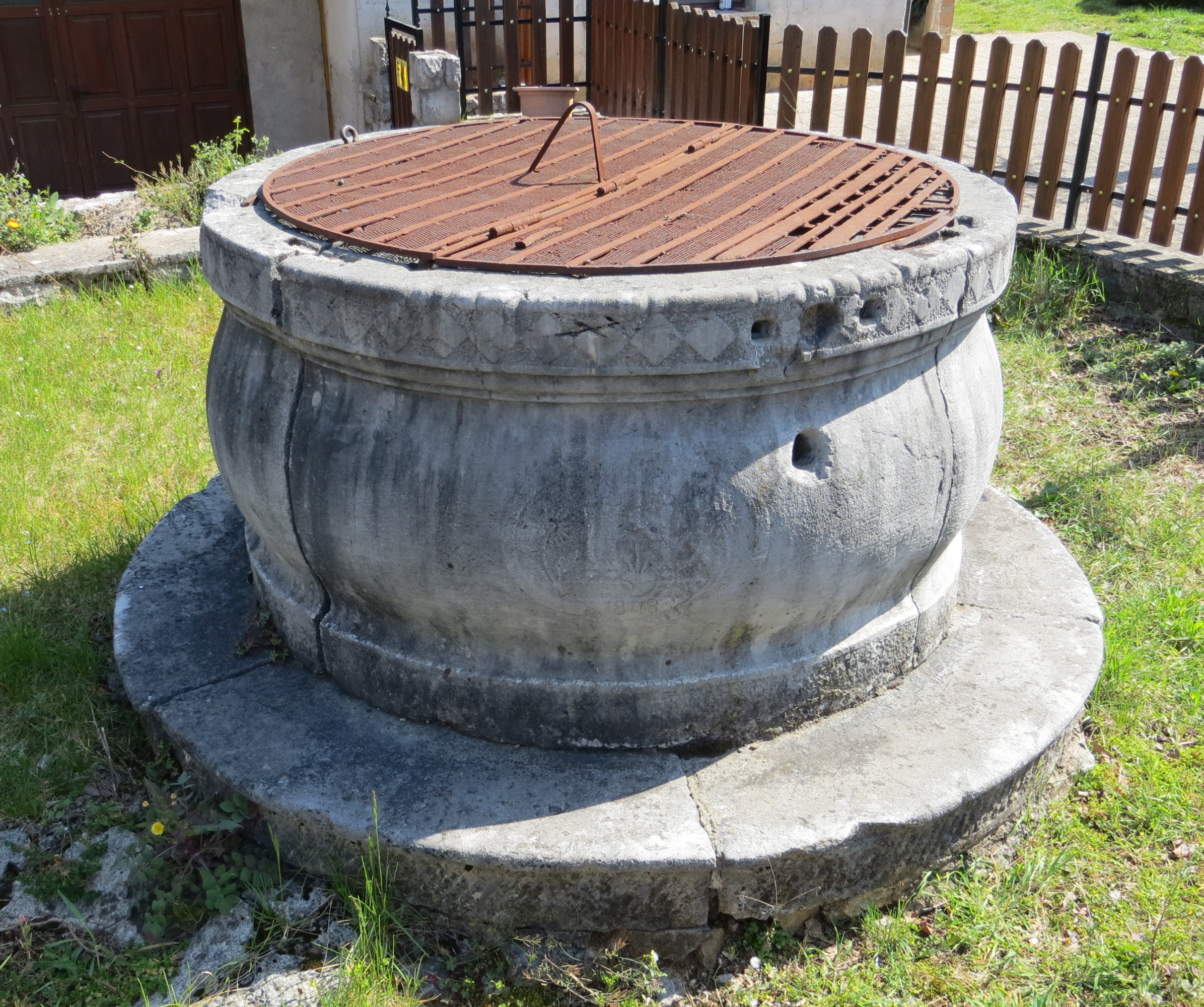
Cistern from 1848

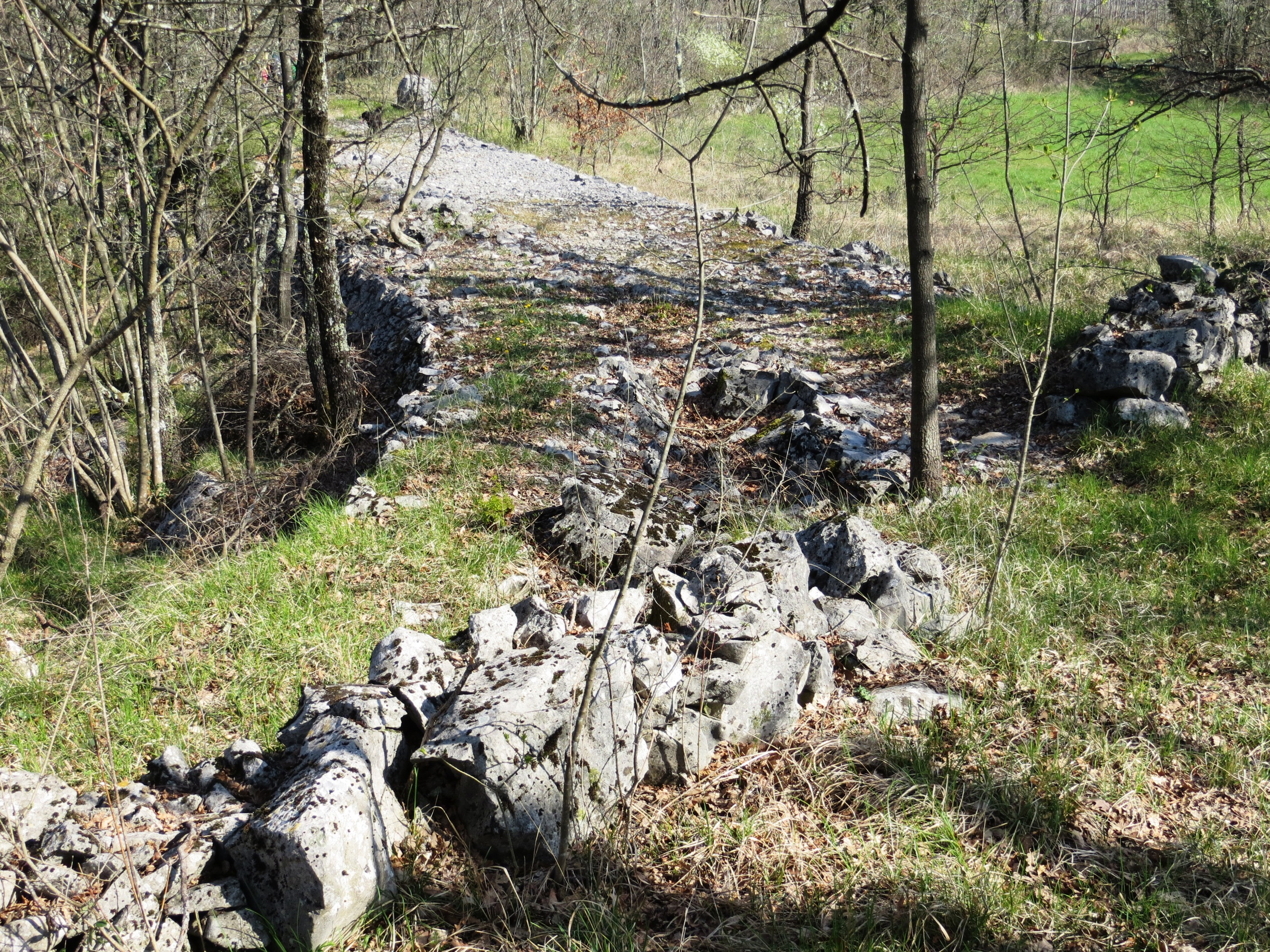
Abandoned railroad bed

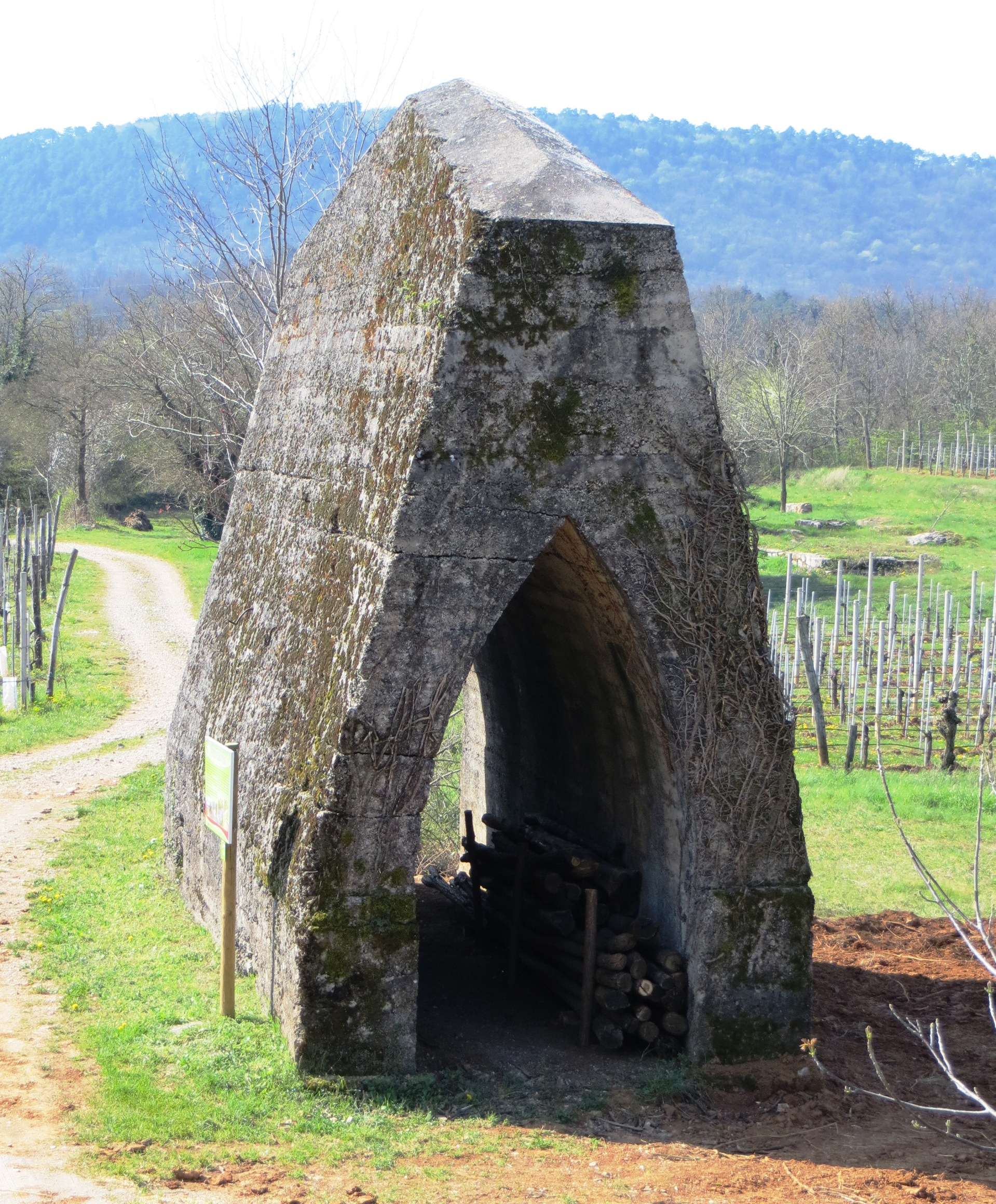
World War One fortification

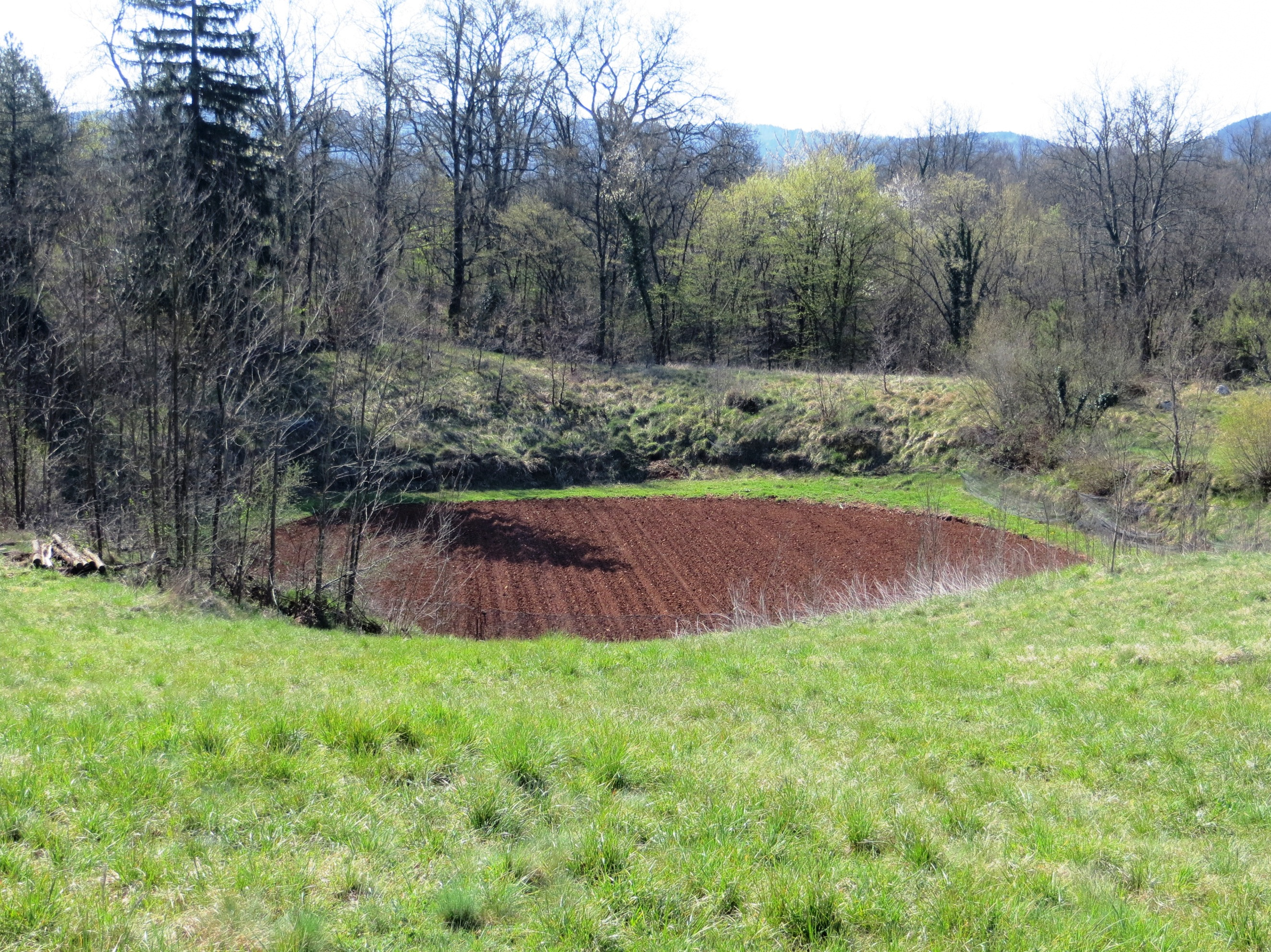
Cultivated sinkhole

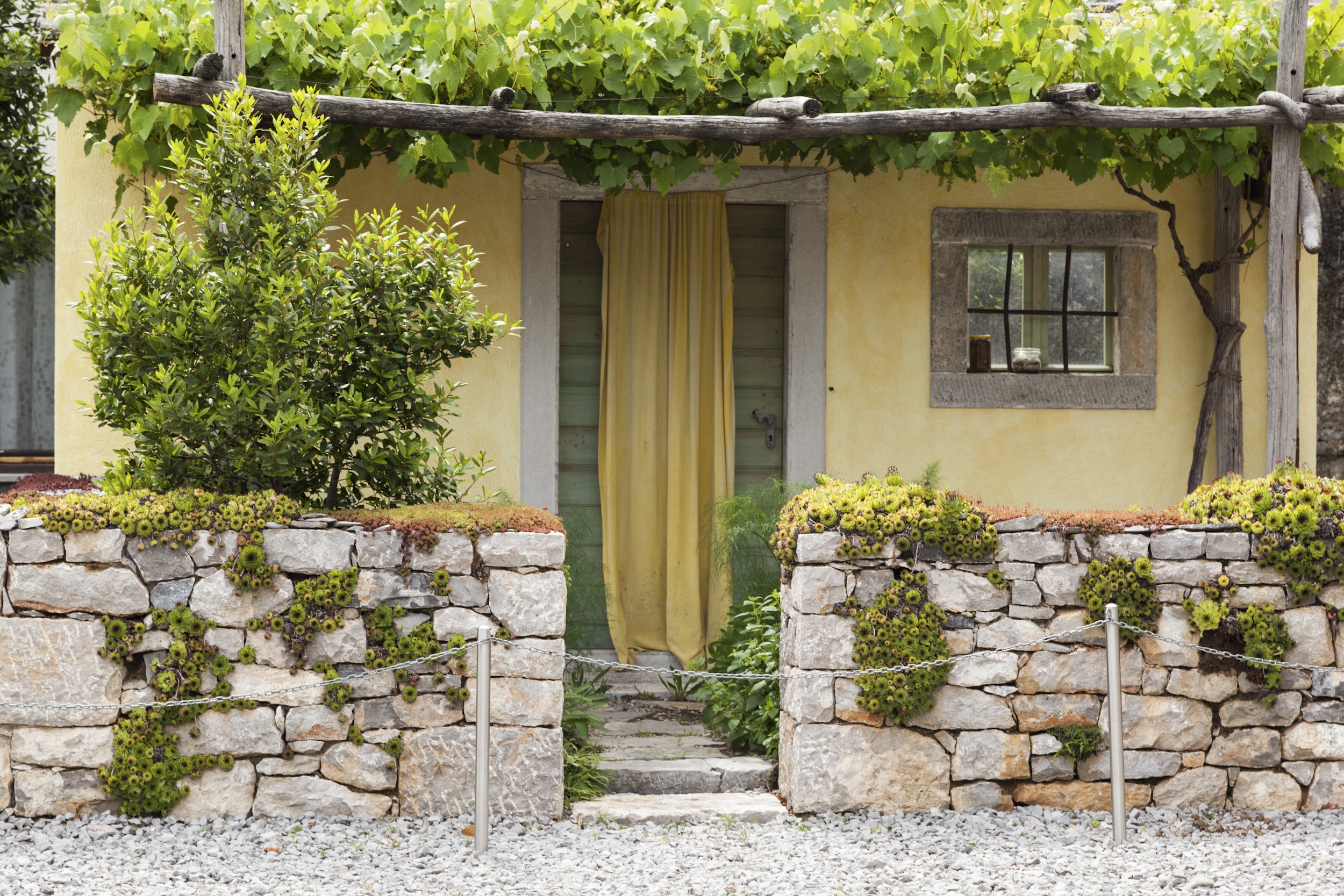
Pepa's Karst Garden
