= Podlubnik =

Place in Slovenia

Coordinates: 46°10′21″N 14°17′36″E

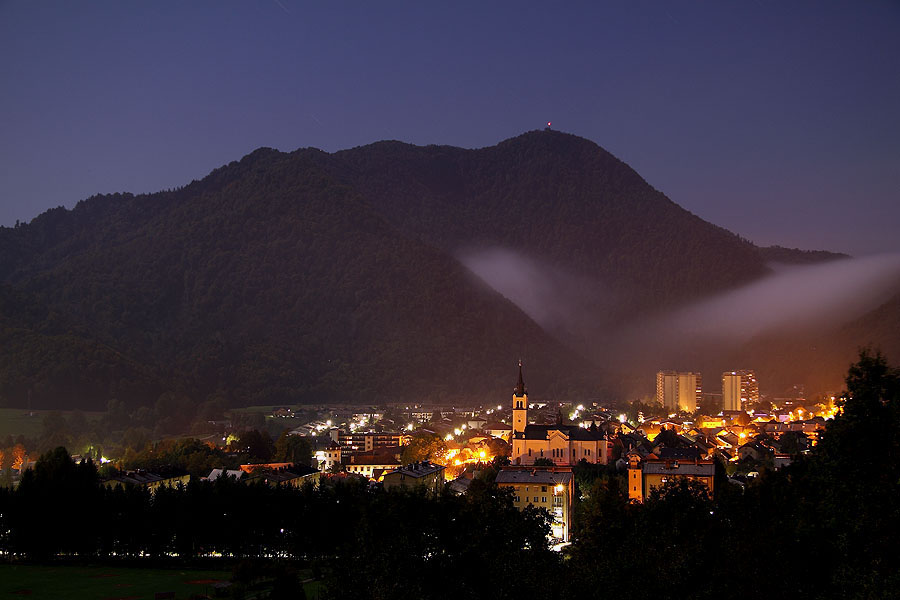
Stara Loka in front, Podlubnik in the back. Behind village: Lubnik hill (1025m).

Podlubnik' is part of a local community Podlubnik/Stara Loka in Municipality of Škofja Loka in the Upper Carniola region of Slovenia.

Podlubnik is divided into houses and 11 skyscrapers. There are also an elementary school and a high school.
