= Velike Rebrce =

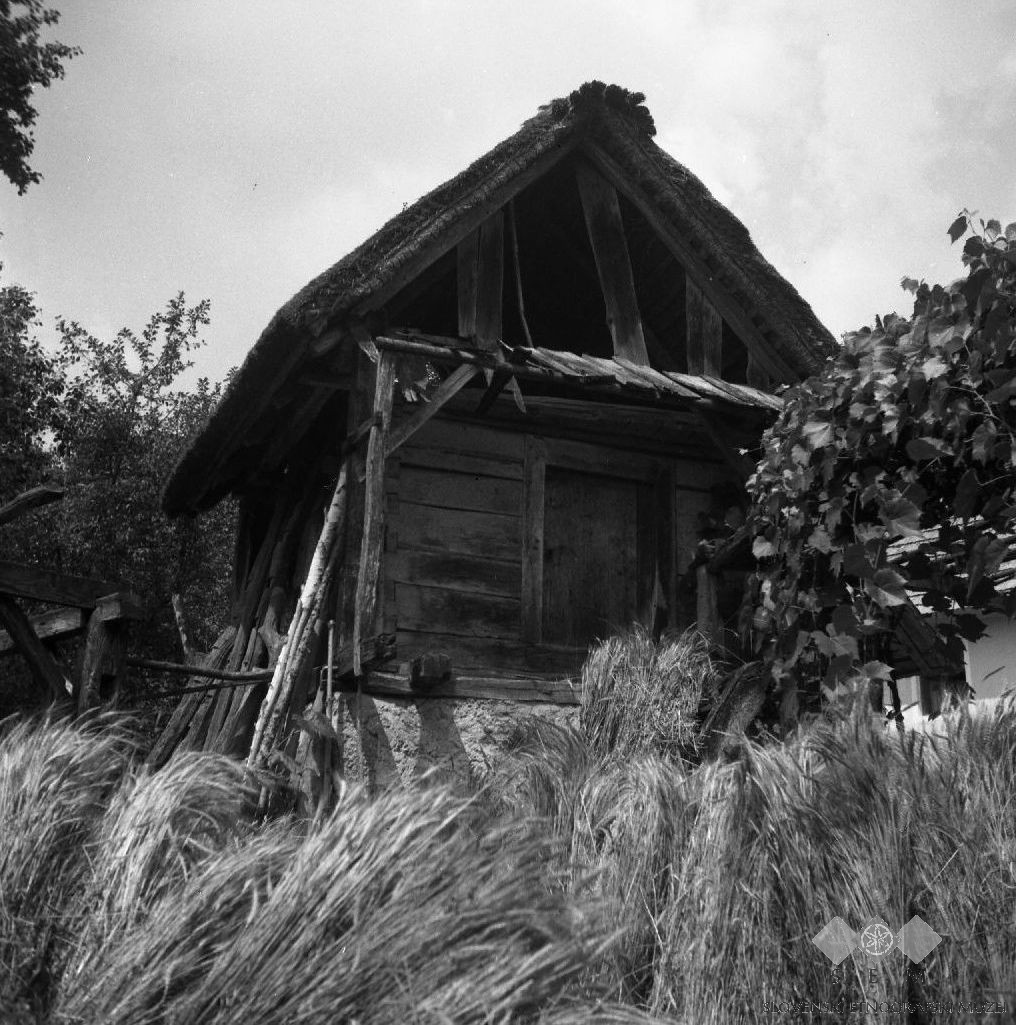
- Kašča, Velike Rebrce in August 1957

- Location in Slovenia
- Coordinates: 45°51′35.36″N 14°51′54.09″E
- Country: Slovenia
- Traditional region: Lower Carniola
- Statistical region: Central Slovenia
- Municipality: Ivančna Gorica

Area
  - Total: 0.48 km^{2} (0.19 sq mi)
- Elevation: 505.6 m (1,659 ft)

Population (2002)
  - Total: 44

Velike Rebrce (pronounced [ˈʋeːlikɛ ˈɾeːbəɾtsɛ]) is a settlement on the left bank of the Krka River in the Municipality of Ivančna Gorica in central Slovenia. The area is part of the historical region of Lower Carniola. The municipality is now included in the Central Slovenia Statistical Region.

A Roman period burial ground was discovered near the settlement in the late 19th century.
