= Male Lese =

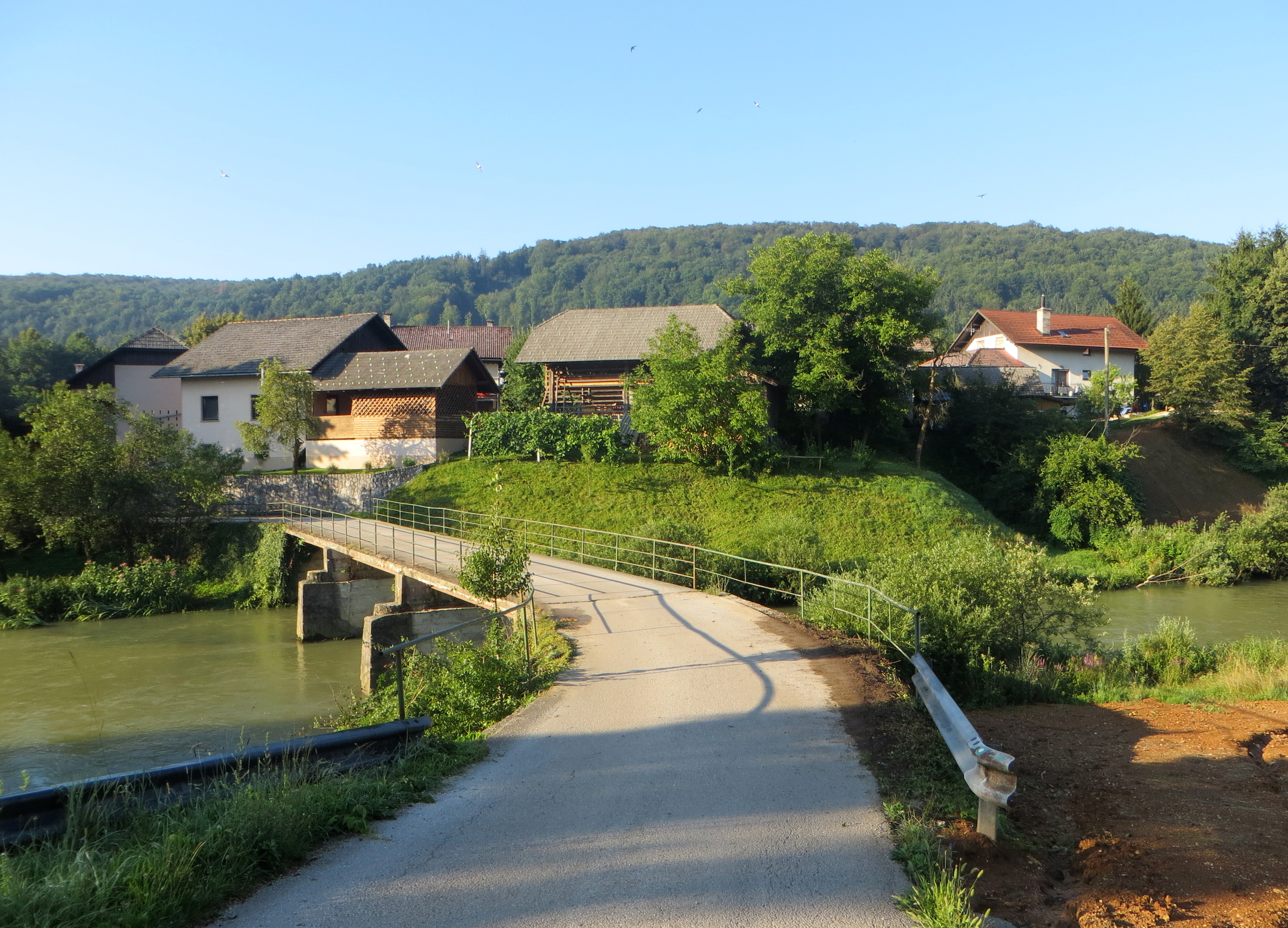

- Location in Slovenia
- Coordinates: 45°52′14.91″N 14°48′29.04″E
- Country: Slovenia
- Traditional region: Lower Carniola
- Statistical region: Central Slovenia
- Municipality: Ivančna Gorica

Area
  - Total: 0.93 km^{2} (0.36 sq mi)
- Elevation: 261.3 m (857 ft)

Population (2002)
  - Total: 40

Male Lese (pronounced [ˈmaːlɛ ˈleːsɛ]; German: Kleinlesse) is a small settlement on the right bank of the Krka River in the Municipality of Ivančna Gorica in central Slovenia. The area is part of the historical region of Lower Carniola. The municipality is now included in the Central Slovenia Statistical Region.

A small chapel-shrine in the settlement is dedicated to the Virgin Mary and dates to the late 19th century.
