= Bakrc =

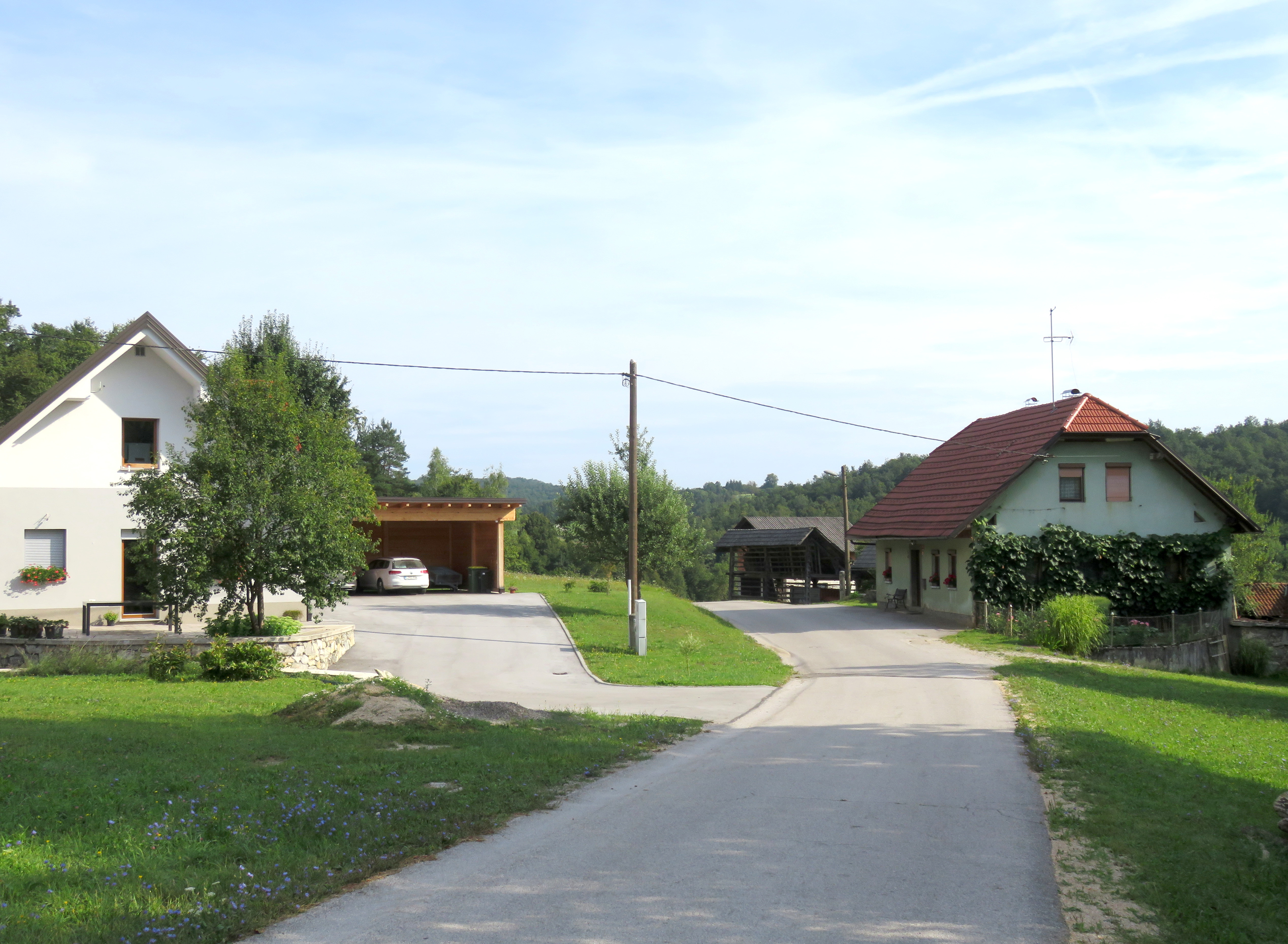

- Location in Slovenia
- Coordinates: 45°48′34.86″N 14°50′53.84″E
- Country: Slovenia
- Traditional region: Lower Carniola
- Statistical region: Central Slovenia
- Municipality: Ivančna Gorica

Area
  - Total: 0.71 km^{2} (0.27 sq mi)
- Elevation: 401.7 m (1,318 ft)

Population (2002)
  - Total: 10

Bakrc (pronounced [ˈbaːkəɾts]; in older sources also Bakerc, German: Wacherz) is a small settlement in the Municipality of Ivančna Gorica in central Slovenia. It lies southeast of Ambrus in the historical region of Lower Carniola. The municipality is now included in the Central Slovenia Statistical Region.

== History ==
Before the Second World War, Bakrc had a population of 40 people living in eight houses. During the war, a group of 22 Partisans attacked the village in early 1943 but were routed by anti-communist militia. The village was burned on 16 March 1943. According to some sources, the Partisan Tone Tomšič Brigade burned the village. Other sources state that Italian forces burned the village.
