= Polje pri Višnji Gori =

Polje pri Višnji Gori Polje (until 1953)
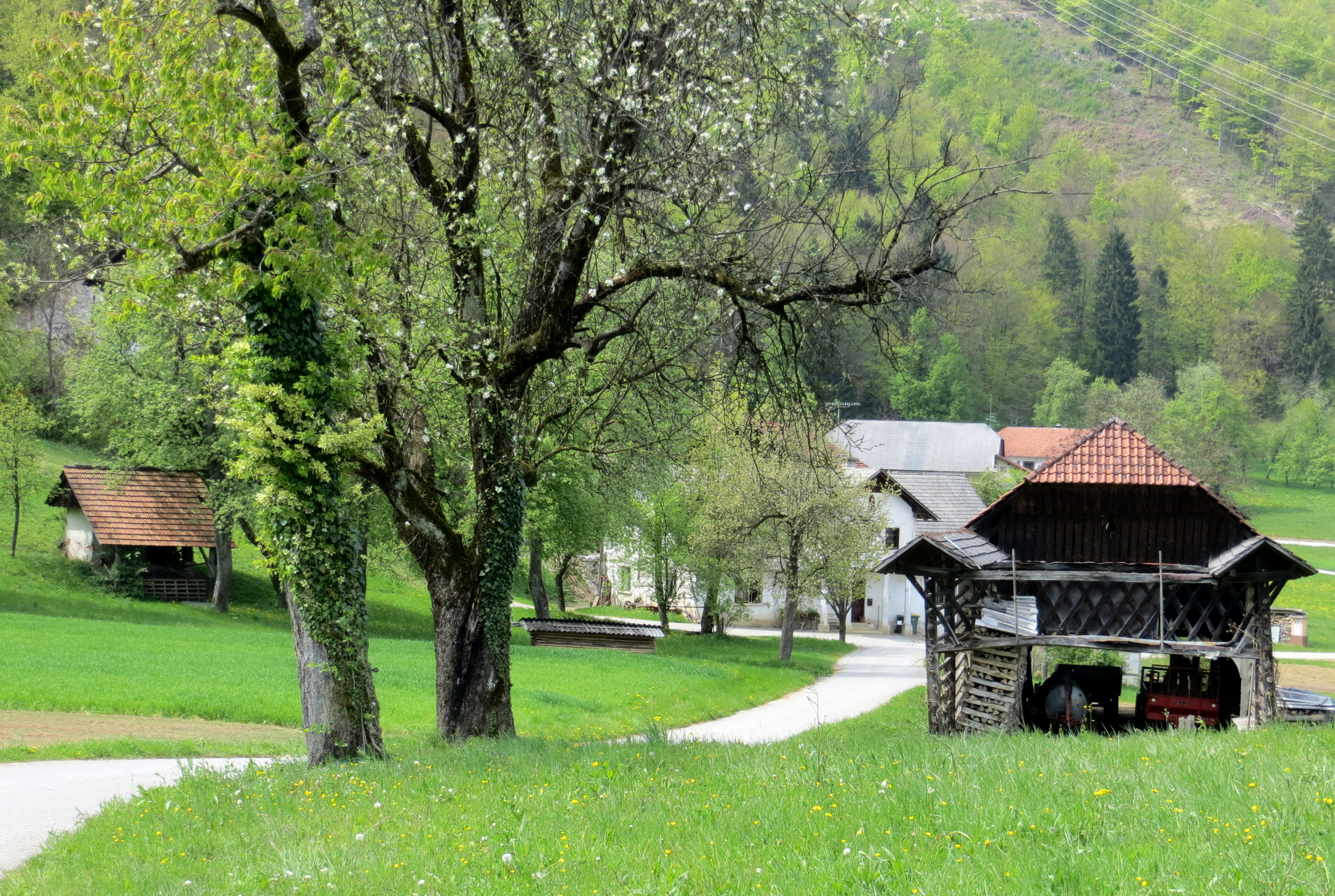

- Location in Slovenia
- Coordinates: 45°56′39.87″N 14°45′28.44″E
- Country: Slovenia
- Traditional region: Lower Carniola
- Statistical region: Central Slovenia
- Municipality: Ivančna Gorica

Area
  - Total: 0.98 km^{2} (0.38 sq mi)
- Elevation: 349.2 m (1,146 ft)

Population (2002)
  - Total: 31

Polje pri Višnji Gori (pronounced [ˈpoːljɛ pɾi ˈʋiːʃnji ˈɡɔːɾi]; German: Feld) is a settlement southeast of Višnja Gora in the traditional region of Lower Carniola in central Slovenia. It belongs to the Municipality of Ivančna Gorica, which is included in the Central Slovenia Statistical Region.

== Name ==
The name of the settlement was changed from Polje to Polje pri Višnji Gori in 1953. In the past the German name was Feld.

== Cultural heritage ==
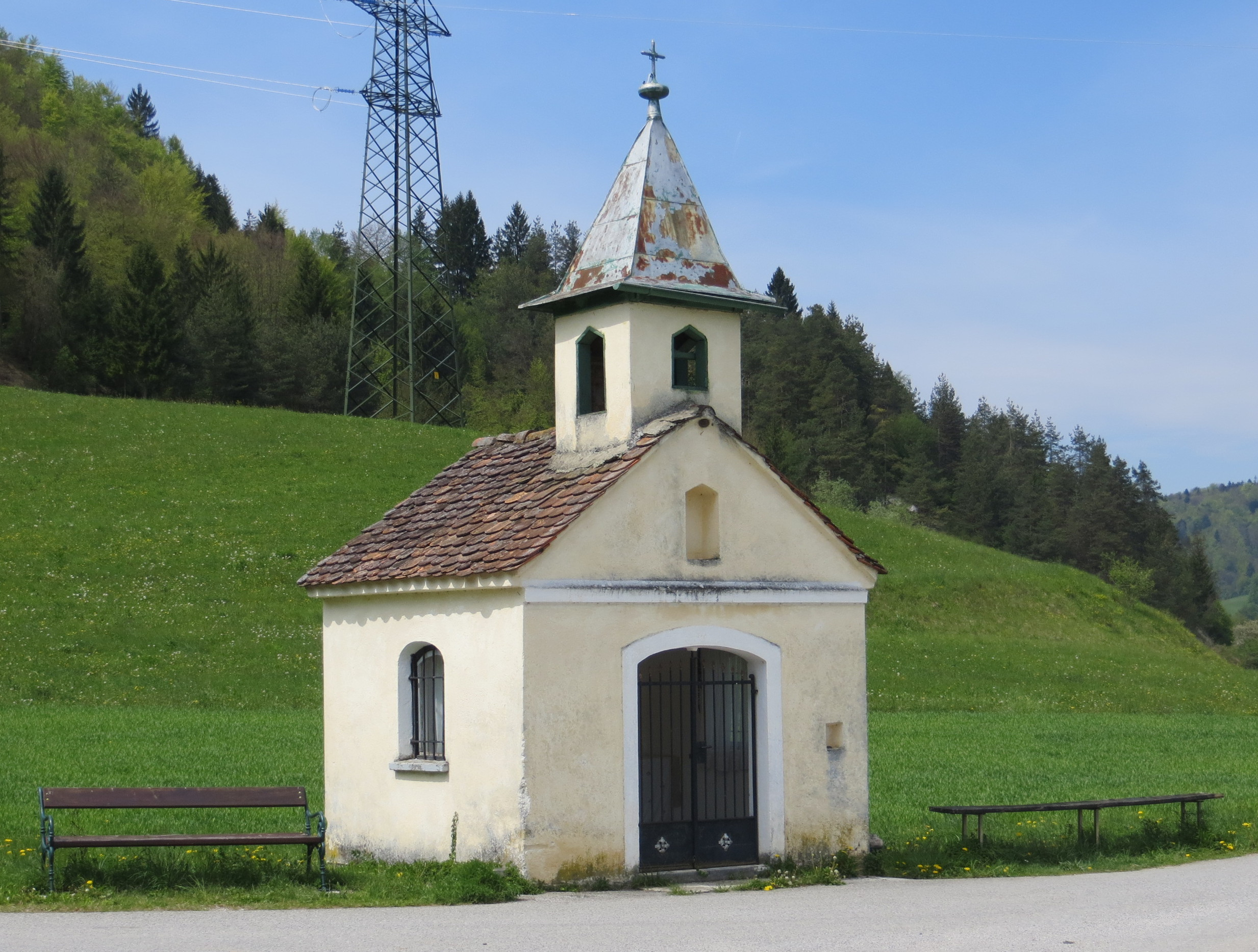
Shrine in Polje pri Višnji Gori

There is a chapel-shrine in Polje pri Višnji Gori dedicated to the Virgin Mary. It stands in the northwest part of the village and dates to the late 19th century. The shrine has a niche in the gable and a small tower, and it houses a statue of the Virgin Mary.

== Notable people ==
Notable people that were born or lived in Polje pri Višnji Gori include:

- France Lokar (1917–1994), priest and poet, born in Polje pri Višnji Gori
