= Veliko Črnelo =

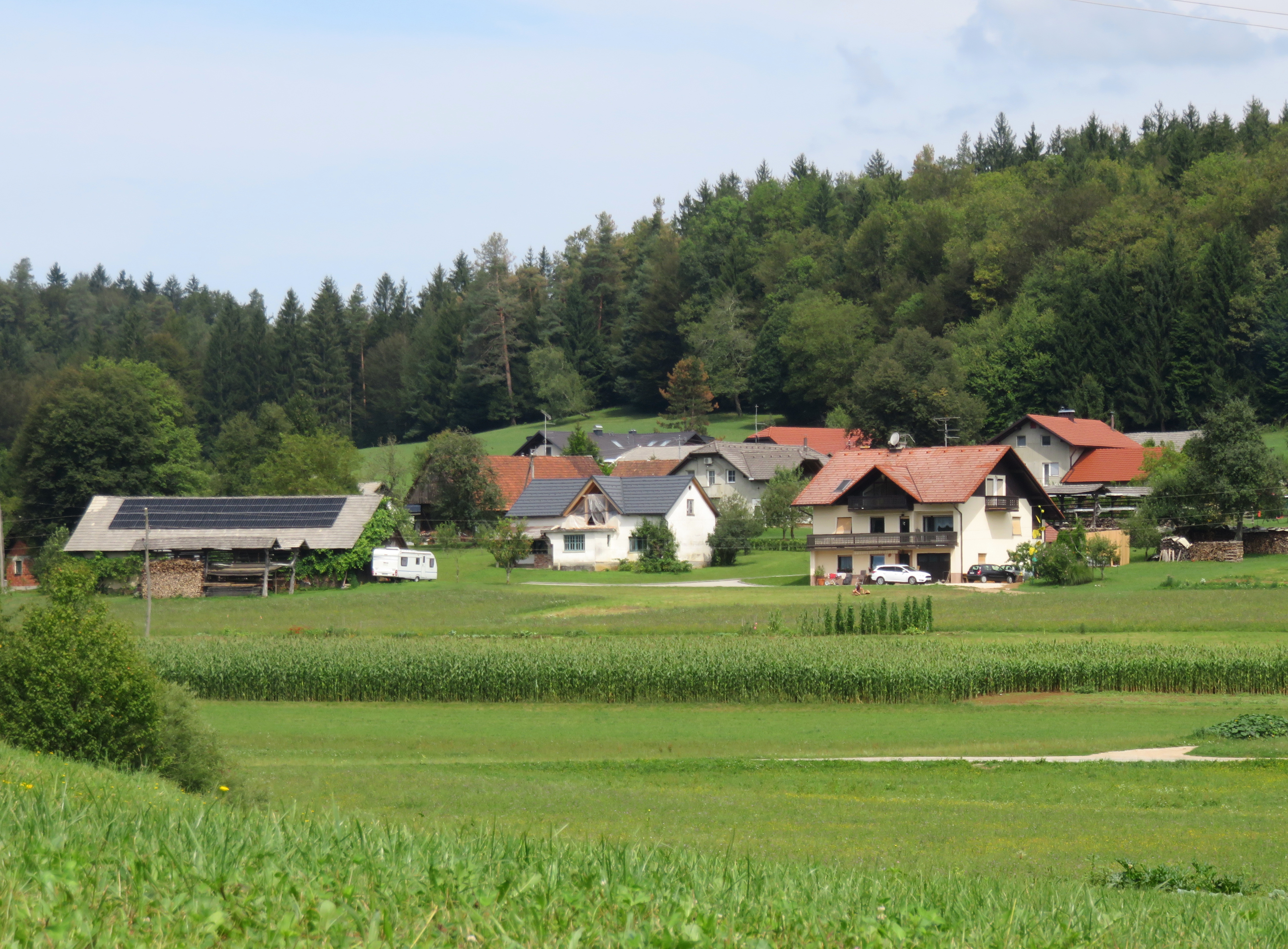

- Location in Slovenia
- Coordinates: 45°55′30.14″N 14°47′29.89″E
- Country: Slovenia
- Traditional region: Lower Carniola
- Statistical region: Central Slovenia
- Municipality: Ivančna Gorica

Area
  - Total: 1.83 km^{2} (0.71 sq mi)
- Elevation: 325.4 m (1,068 ft)

Population (2002)
  - Total: 73

Veliko Črnelo (pronounced [ˈʋeːlikɔ tʃəɾˈneːlɔ]; German: Großtschernelo) is a small settlement south of Ivančna Gorica in the historical region of Lower Carniola in Slovenia. The area is part of the Central Slovenia Statistical Region.
