= Pristava pri Višnji Gori =

Pristava pri Višnji Gori Pristava (until 1953)
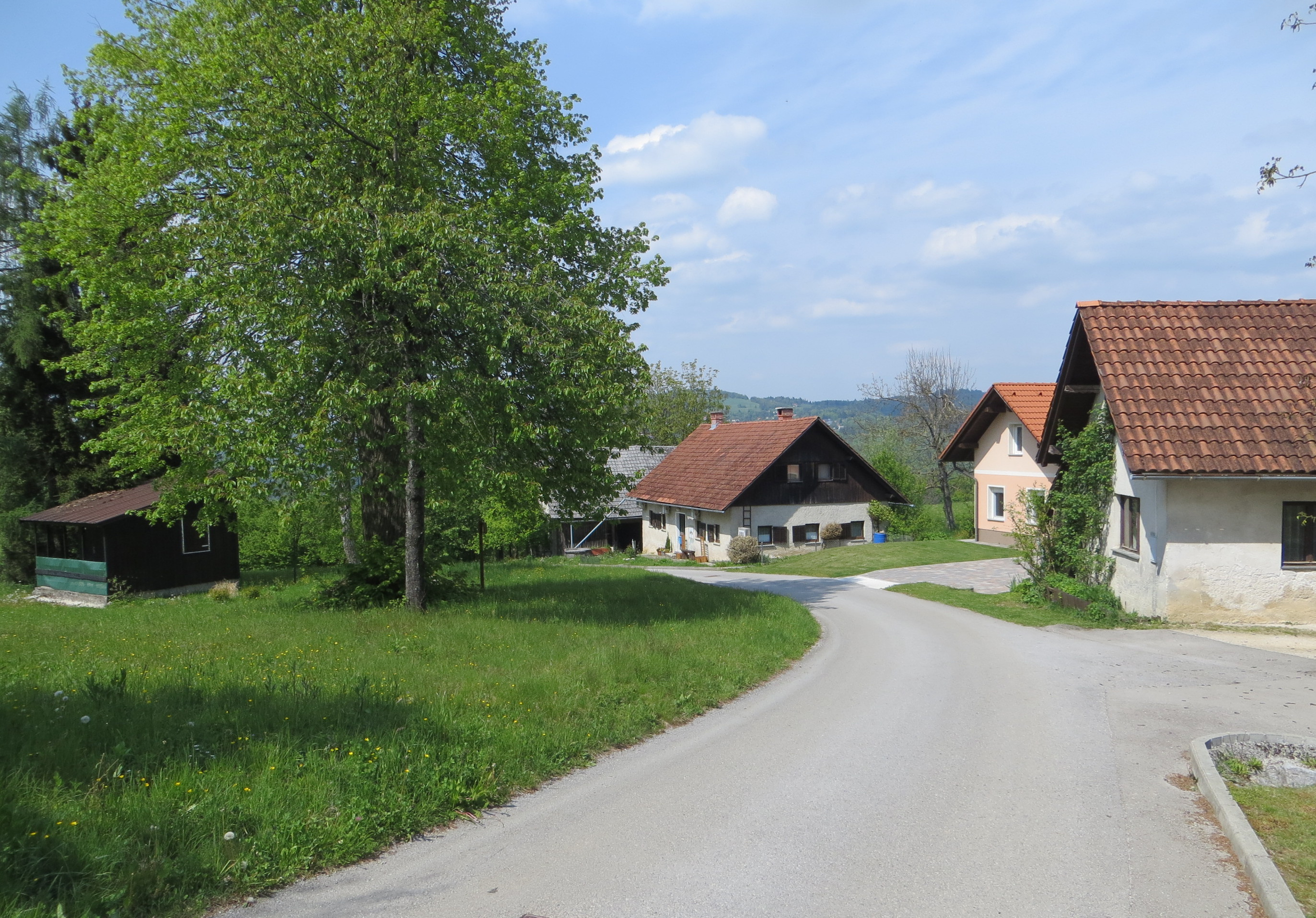

- Location in Slovenia
- Coordinates: 45°56′47.53″N 14°44′38.72″E
- Country: Slovenia
- Traditional region: Lower Carniola
- Statistical region: Central Slovenia
- Municipality: Ivančna Gorica

Area
  - Total: 0.81 km^{2} (0.31 sq mi)
- Elevation: 540.8 m (1,774 ft)

Population (2002)
  - Total: 16

Pristava pri Višnji Gori (pronounced [pɾiˈstaːʋa pɾi ˈʋiːʃnji ˈɡɔːɾi]; German: Maierhof) is a small settlement in the hills south of Višnja Gora in the Municipality of Ivančna Gorica in central Slovenia. The area is part of the historical region of Lower Carniola. The municipality is now included in the Central Slovenia Statistical Region.

== Name ==
The name of the settlement was changed from Pristava to Pristava pri Višnji Gori in 1953. In the past the German name was Maierhof.
