= Male Češnjice =

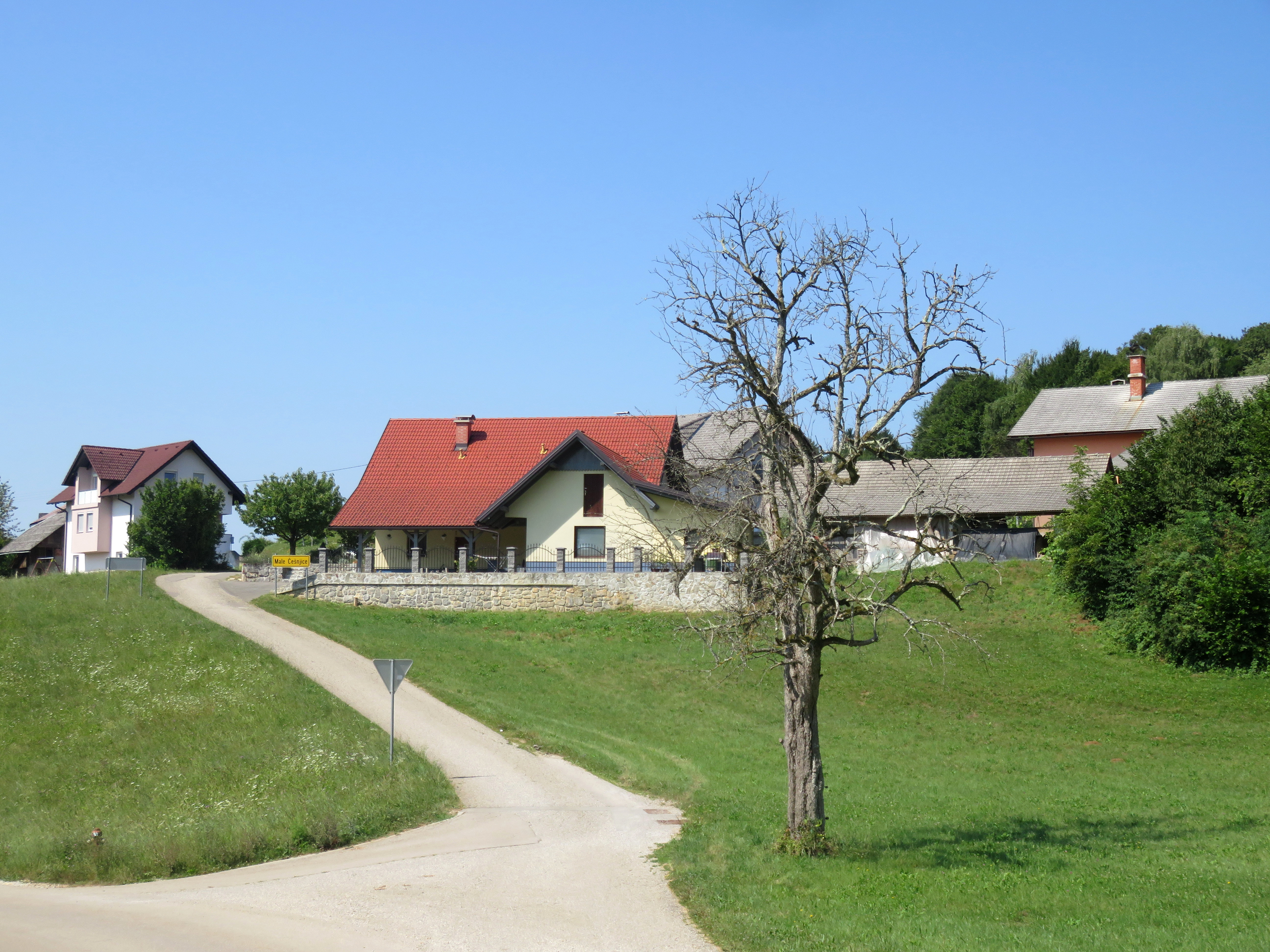

- Location in Slovenia
- Coordinates: 45°57′45.18″N 14°50′30.53″E
- Country: Slovenia
- Traditional region: Lower Carniola
- Statistical region: Central Slovenia
- Municipality: Ivančna Gorica

Area
  - Total: 0.69 km^{2} (0.27 sq mi)
- Elevation: 337.8 m (1,108 ft)

Population (2002)
  - Total: 89

Male Češnjice (pronounced [ˈmaːlɛ ˈtʃeːnjitsɛ]; in older sources also Male Črešnjice, German: Kleintscheschenze) is a small settlement just north of Šentvid pri Stični in the Municipality of Ivančna Gorica in central Slovenia. The area is part of the historical region of Lower Carniola. The municipality is now included in the Central Slovenia Statistical Region.
