= Municipality of Ivančna Gorica =

Municipality of Slovenia

Municipality of Ivančna Gorica Občina Ivančna Gorica
- Municipality
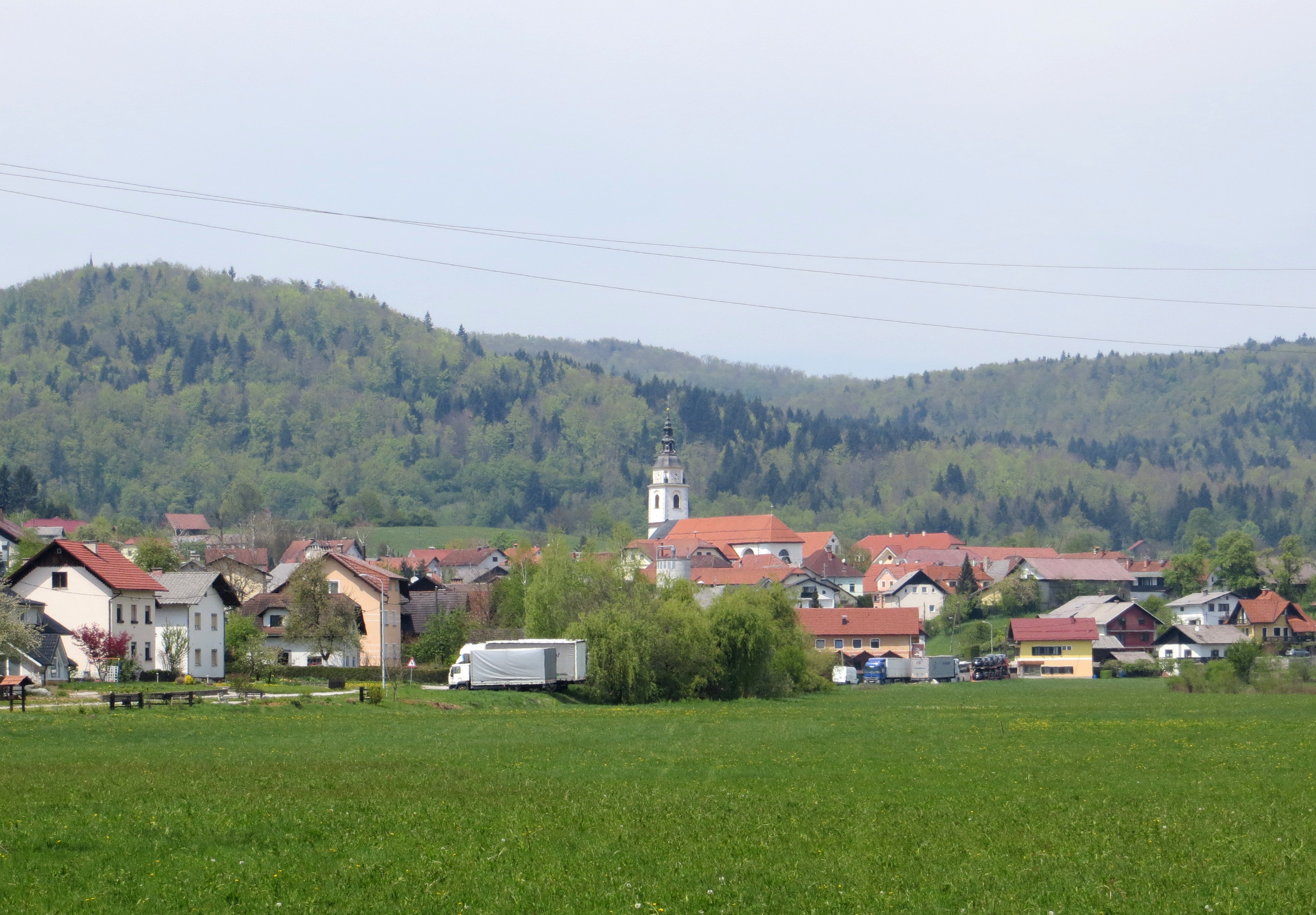

- Location of the Municipality of Ivančna Gorica in Slovenia
- Coordinates: 45°56′N 14°48′E
- Country: Slovenia

Government
  - Mayor: Dušan Strnad (Independent)

Area
  - Total: 227 km^{2} (88 sq mi)

Population (2016)
  - Total: 16,276
  - Density: 71.7/km^{2} (186/sq mi)
- Time zone: UTC+01 (CET)
  - Summer (DST): UTC+02 (CEST)
- Website: www.ivancna-gorica.si

The Municipality of Ivančna Gorica (pronounced [iˈʋaːntʃna ɡɔˈɾiːtsa]; Slovene: Občina Ivančna Gorica) is a municipality in the traditional region of Lower Carniola in central Slovenia. The seat of the municipality is the town of Ivančna Gorica. Ivančna Gorica became a municipality in 1995.

== Settlements ==
In addition to the municipal seat of Ivančna Gorica, the municipality also includes the following settlements:

- Ambrus
- Artiža Vas
- Bakrc
- Boga Vas
- Bojanji Vrh
- Bratnice
- Breg pri Dobu
- Breg pri Temenici
- Breg pri Zagradcu
- Brezovi Dol
- Bukovica
- Čagošče
- Češnjice pri Zagradcu
- Debeče
- Dečja Vas pri Zagradcu
- Dedni Dol
- Dob pri Šentvidu
- Dobrava pri Stični
- Dolenja Vas pri Temenici
- Fužina
- Gabrje pri Stični
- Gabrovčec
- Gabrovka pri Zagradcu
- Glogovica
- Gorenja Vas
- Gorenje Brezovo
- Gradiček
- Grintovec
- Griže
- Grm
- Hrastov Dol
- Kal
- Kamni Vrh pri Ambrusu
- Kamno Brdo
- Kitni Vrh
- Kriška Vas
- Krka
- Krška Vas
- Kuželjevec
- Laze nad Krko
- Leščevje
- Leskovec
- Lučarjev Kal
- Mala Dobrava
- Mala Goričica
- Male Češnjice
- Male Dole pri Temenici
- Male Kompolje
- Male Lese
- Male Pece
- Male Rebrce
- Male Vrhe
- Mali Kal
- Mali Korinj
- Malo Črnelo
- Malo Globoko
- Malo Hudo
- Marinča Vas
- Mekinje nad Stično
- Metnaj
- Mevce
- Mleščevo
- Mrzlo Polje
- Muljava
- Nova Vas
- Obolno
- Oslica
- Osredek nad Stično
- Petrušnja Vas
- Peščenik
- Planina
- Podboršt
- Podbukovje
- Podsmreka pri Višnji Gori
- Pokojnica
- Poljane pri Stični
- Polje pri Višnji Gori
- Potok pri Muljavi
- Praproče pri Temenici
- Primča Vas
- Pristava nad Stično
- Pristava pri Višnji Gori
- Pristavlja Vas
- Pungert
- Pusti Javor
- Radanja Vas
- Radohova Vas
- Ravni Dol
- Rdeči Kal
- Sad
- Sela pri Dobu
- Sela pri Sobračah
- Sela pri Višnji Gori
- Selo pri Radohovi Vasi
- Šentjurje
- Šentpavel na Dolenjskem
- Šentvid pri Stični
- Škoflje
- Škrjanče
- Sobrače
- Spodnja Draga
- Spodnje Brezovo
- Stari Trg
- Stična
- Stranska Vas ob Višnjici
- Sušica
- Temenica
- Tolčane
- Trebež
- Trebnja Gorica
- Trnovica
- Valična Vas
- Velika Dobrava
- Velike Češnjice
- Velike Dole pri Temenici
- Velike Kompolje
- Velike Lese
- Velike Pece
- Velike Rebrce
- Velike Vrhe
- Veliki Kal
- Veliki Korinj
- Veliko Črnelo
- Veliko Globoko
- Videm pri Temenici
- Vir pri Stični
- Višnja Gora
- Višnje
- Vrh pri Sobračah
- Vrh pri Višnji Gori
- Vrhpolje pri Šentvidu
- Zaboršt pri Šentvidu
- Zagradec
- Zavrtače
- Zgornja Draga
- Znojile pri Krki
