= Mali Korinj =

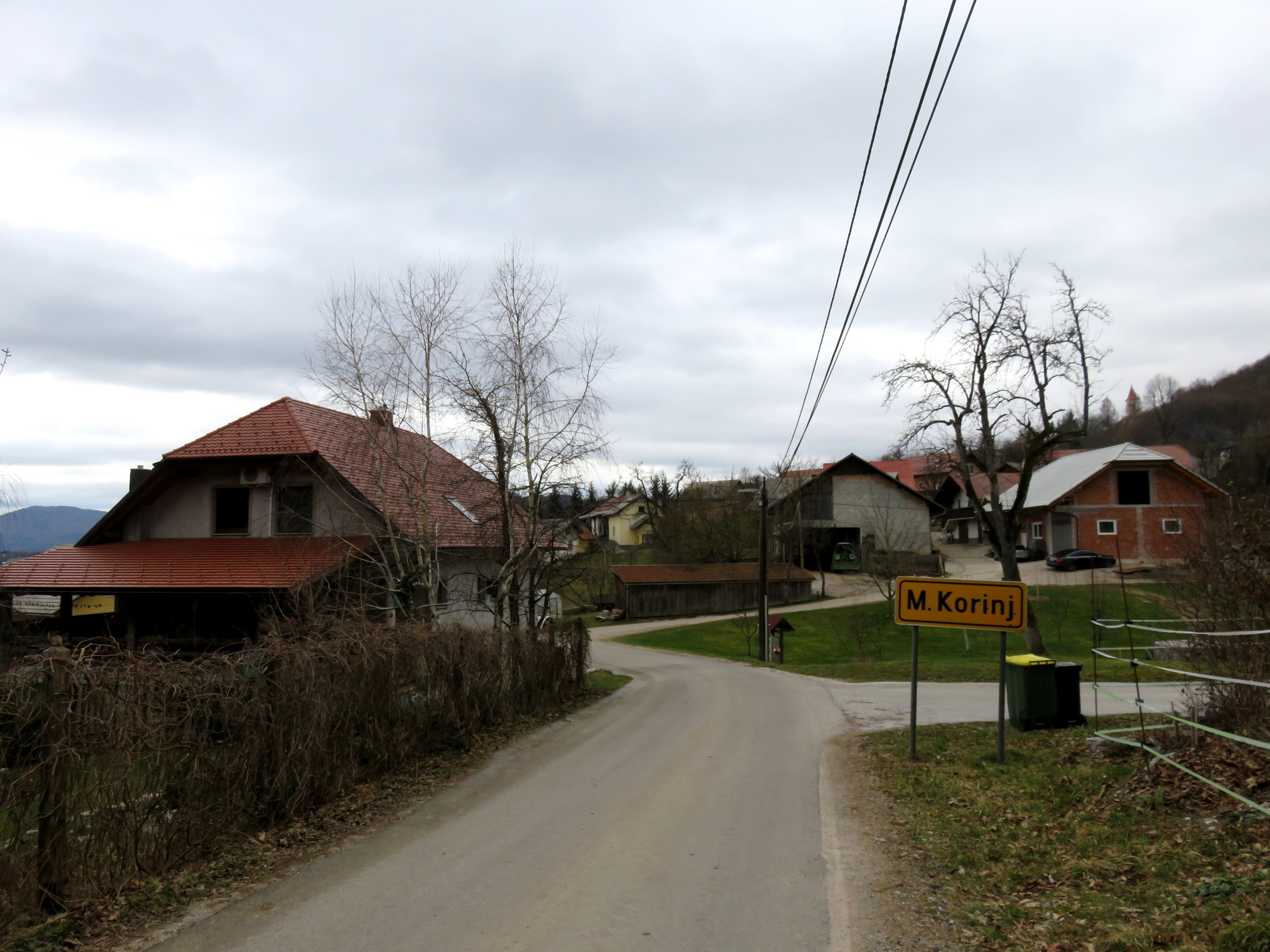

- Location in Slovenia
- Coordinates: 45°50′40.5″N 14°47′6.39″E
- Country: Slovenia
- Traditional region: Lower Carniola
- Statistical region: Central Slovenia
- Municipality: Ivančna Gorica

Area
  - Total: 3.08 km^{2} (1.19 sq mi)
- Elevation: 599 m (1,965 ft)

Population (2002)
  - Total: 49

Mali Korinj (pronounced [ˈmaːli ˈkɔːɾin]) is a small village in the hills south of Krka in the Municipality of Ivančna Gorica in central Slovenia. The area is part of the historical region of Lower Carniola. The municipality is now included in the Central Slovenia Statistical Region.

== Church ==
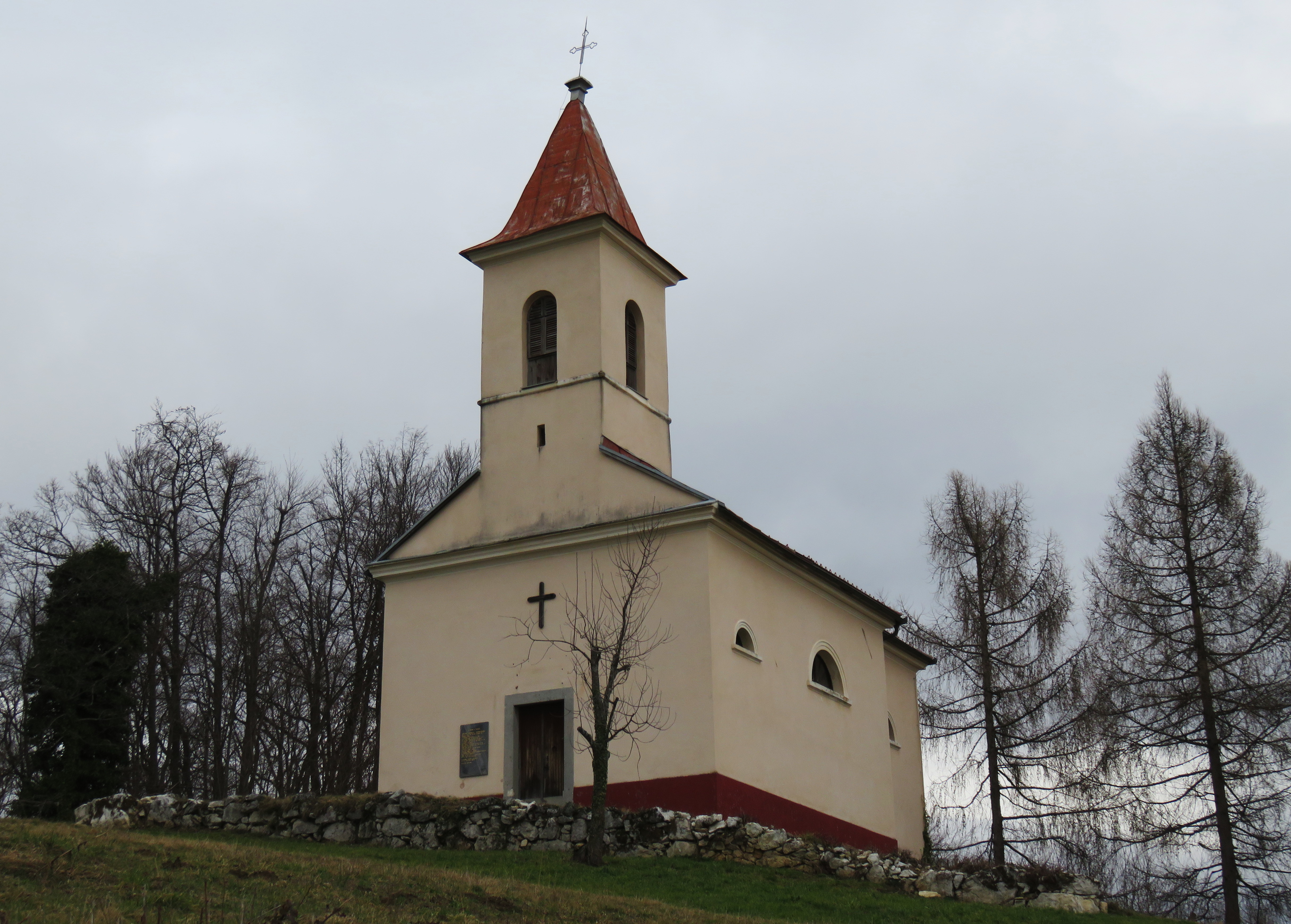
Saint George's Church

The local church is dedicated to Saint George (Slovene: sveti Jurij) and belongs to the Parish of Krka. It is an older building that was thoroughly rebuilt in the 19th century.
