= Bratnice =

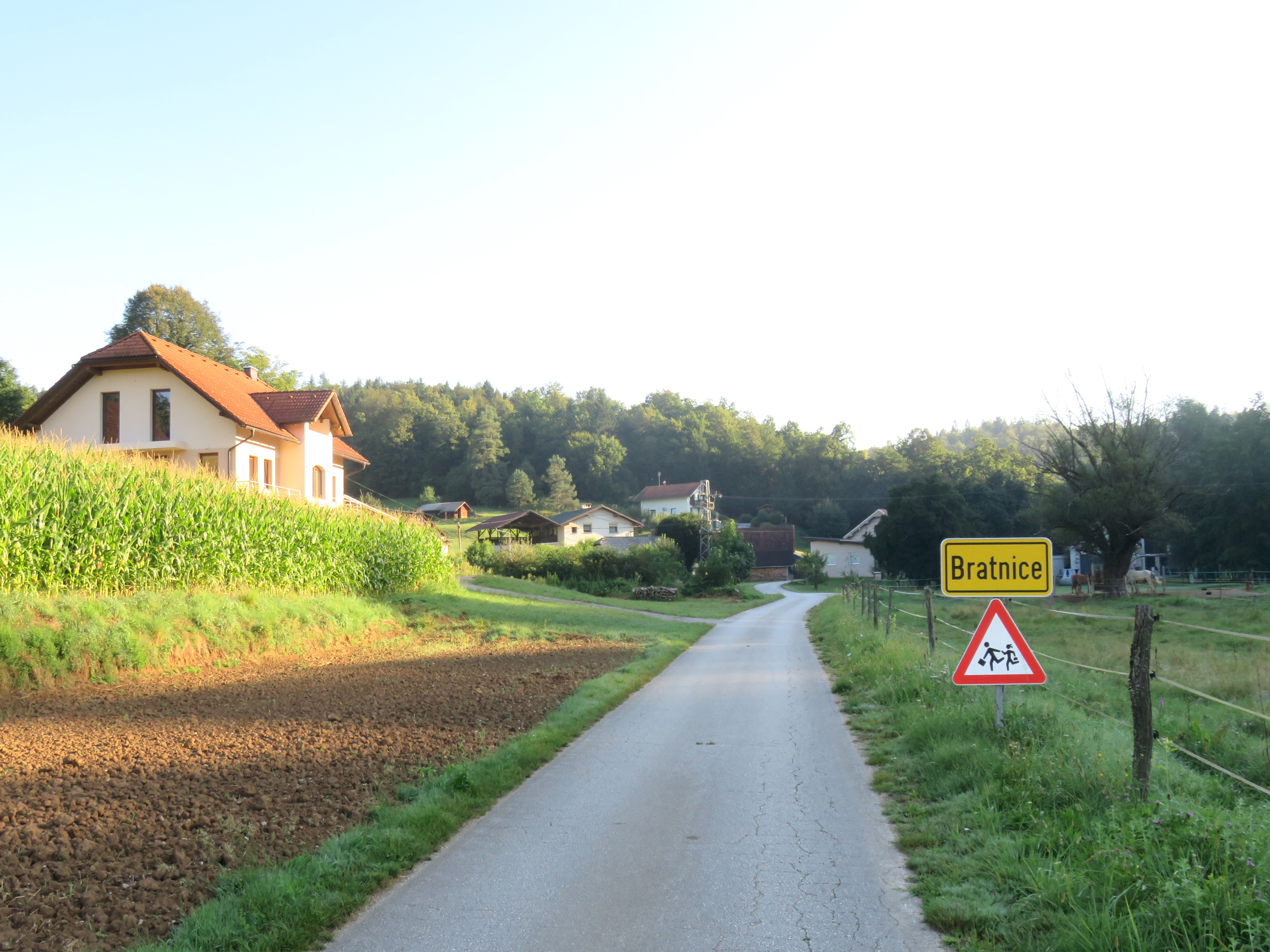

- Location in Slovenia
- Coordinates: 45°57′27.96″N 14°54′55.77″E
- Country: Slovenia
- Traditional region: Lower Carniola
- Statistical region: Central Slovenia
- Municipality: Ivančna Gorica

Area
  - Total: 0.83 km^{2} (0.32 sq mi)
- Elevation: 305.7 m (1,003 ft)

Population (2002)
  - Total: 16

Bratnice (pronounced [ˈbɾaːtnitsɛ]; German: Bratenze) is a small settlement in the Municipality of Ivančna Gorica in central Slovenia. The area is part of the historical region of Lower Carniola and is now included in the Central Slovenia Statistical Region.

== Name ==
Bratnice was attested in written sources as Brüdern in 1250, Ad fratres in 1300, Prätenicz in 1420, and Pruederen in 1505.
