= Veliko Globoko =

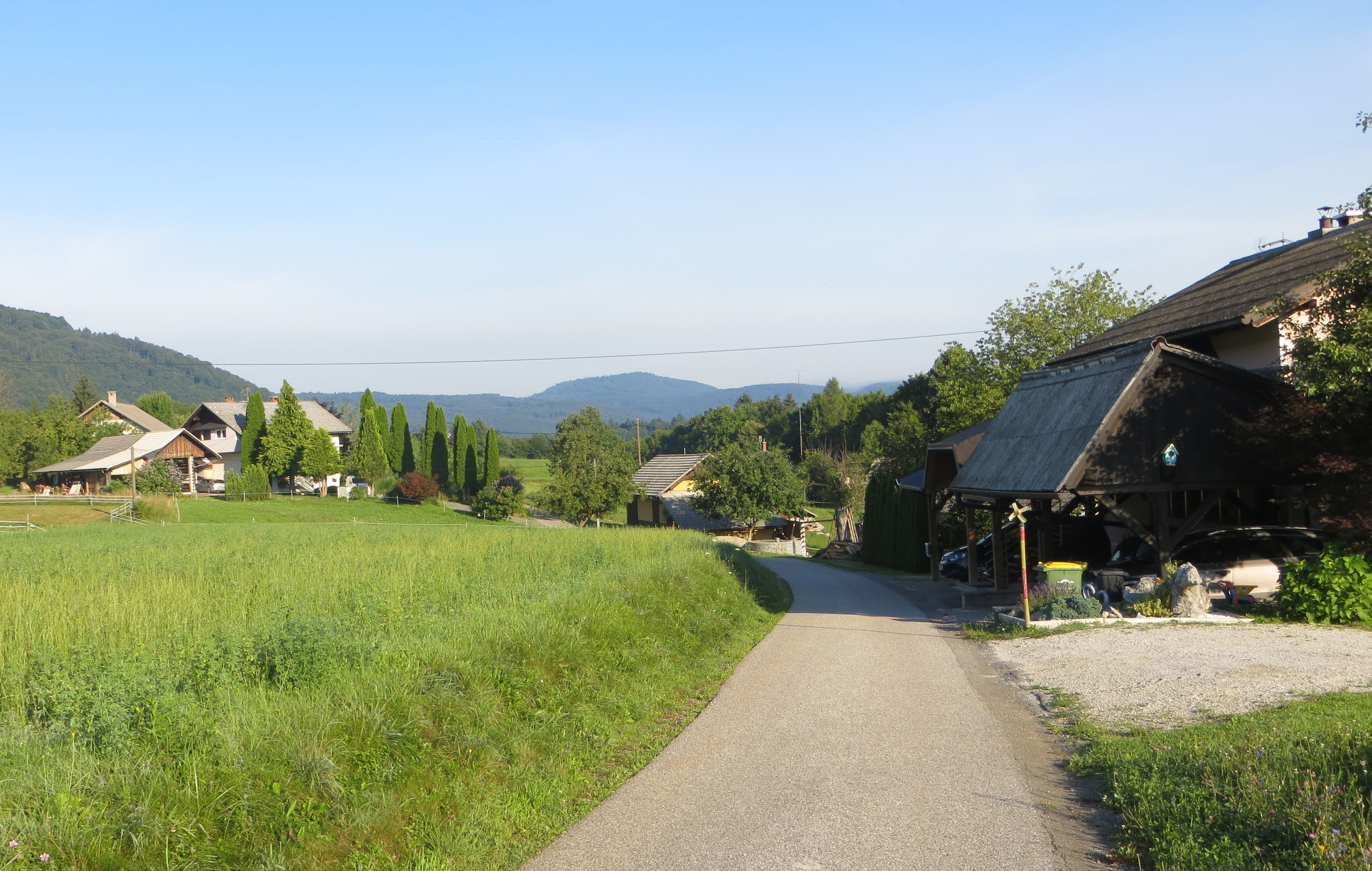

- Location in Slovenia
- Coordinates: 45°52′1.38″N 14°49′12.21″E
- Country: Slovenia
- Traditional region: Lower Carniola
- Statistical region: Central Slovenia
- Municipality: Ivančna Gorica

Area
  - Total: 0.85 km^{2} (0.33 sq mi)
- Elevation: 279.5 m (917 ft)

Population (2002)
  - Total: 69

Veliko Globoko (pronounced [ˈʋeːlikɔ ɡlɔˈbɔːkɔ]) is a small village on the right bank of the Krka River in the Municipality of Ivančna Gorica in central Slovenia. The area is part of the historical region of Lower Carniola and is now included in the Central Slovenia Statistical Region.
