= Potok pri Muljavi =

Potok pri Muljavi Potok (until 1953)
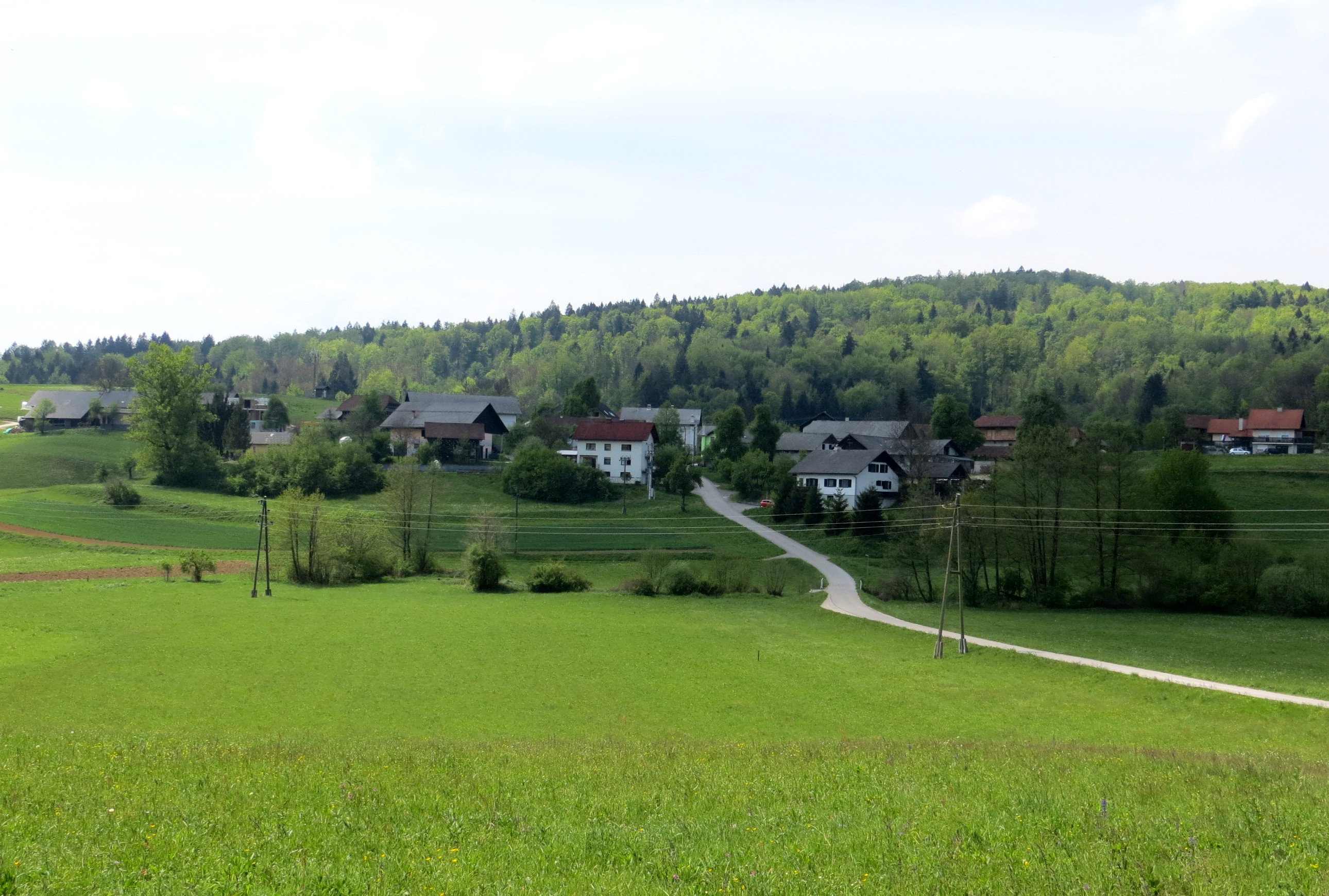

- Location in Slovenia
- Coordinates: 45°53′58.48″N 14°47′36.26″E
- Country: Slovenia
- Traditional region: Lower Carniola
- Statistical region: Central Slovenia
- Municipality: Ivančna Gorica

Area
  - Total: 1.71 km^{2} (0.66 sq mi)
- Elevation: 319.1 m (1,047 ft)

Population (2002)
  - Total: 55

Potok pri Muljavi (pronounced [ˈpɔːtɔk pɾi muˈljaːʋi]) is a small settlement just southwest of Muljava in the Municipality of Ivančna Gorica in central Slovenia. The area is part of the historical region of Lower Carniola. The municipality is now included in the Central Slovenia Statistical Region.

== Name ==
The name of the settlement was changed from Potok to Potok pri Muljavi in 1953.

== Cultural heritage ==
A small roadside chapel in the southern part of the settlement is dedicated to Saint Anthony of Padua. It was built in the early 20th century.
