= Lučarjev Kal =

- Location in Slovenia
- Coordinates: 45°53′55.87″N 14°50′50.66″E
- Country: Slovenia
- Traditional region: Lower Carniola
- Statistical region: Central Slovenia
- Municipality: Ivančna Gorica

Area
  - Total: 4.88 km^{2} (1.88 sq mi)
- Elevation: 369.4 m (1,212 ft)

Population (2002)
  - Total: 78

Lučarjev Kal (pronounced [ˈluːtʃaɾjɛw ˈkaːw]) is a settlement in the hills east of Muljava in the Municipality of Ivančna Gorica in central Slovenia. The area is part of the historical region of Lower Carniola. The municipality is now included in the Central Slovenia Statistical Region.

A small roadside chapel-shrine in the centre of the village is dedicated to Our Lady of Lourdes and was built in the early 20th century.
