= Mevce =

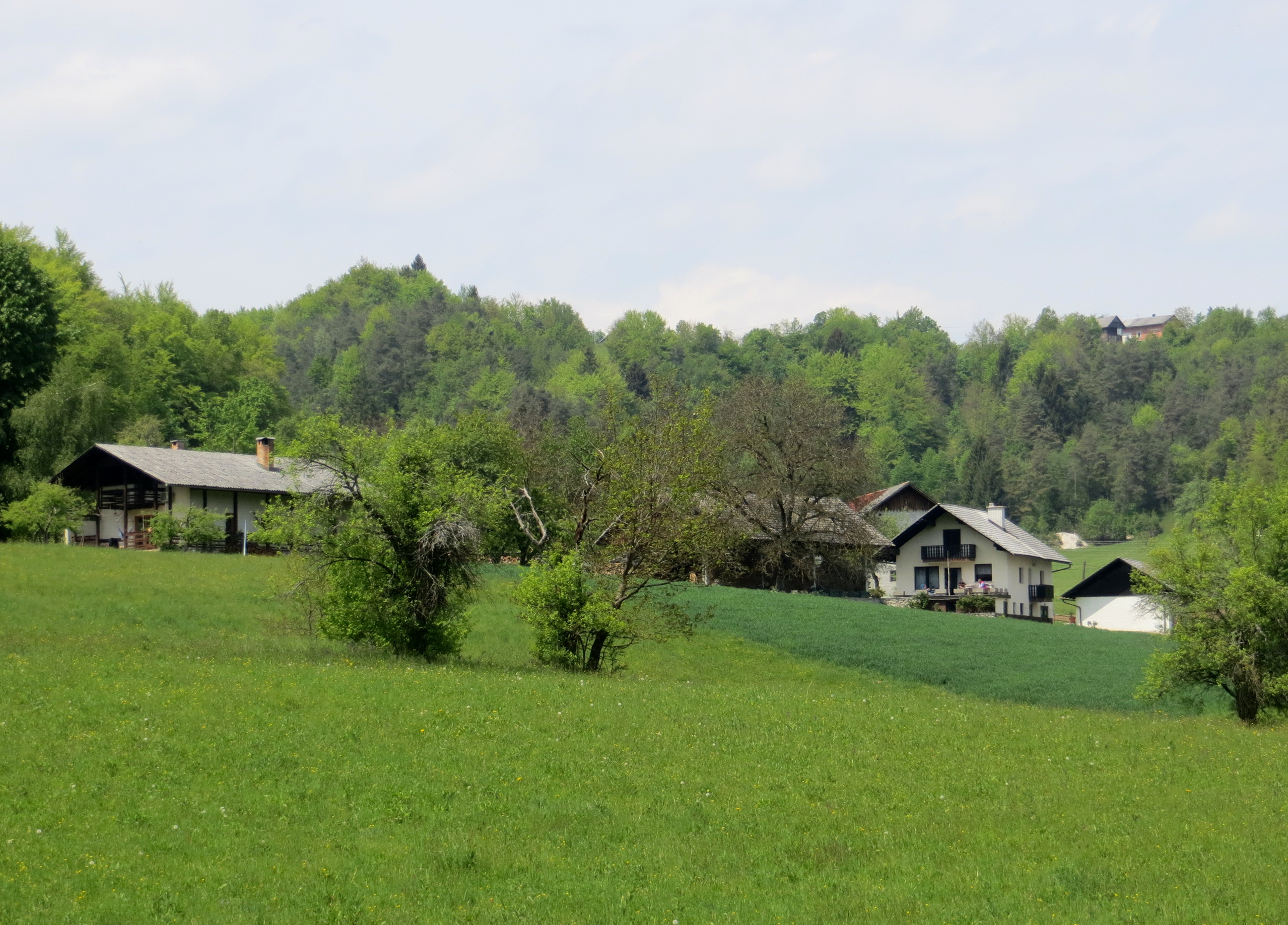

- Location in Slovenia
- Coordinates: 45°54′30.11″N 14°46′33.96″E
- Country: Slovenia
- Traditional region: Lower Carniola
- Statistical region: Central Slovenia
- Municipality: Ivančna Gorica

Area
  - Total: 1.13 km^{2} (0.44 sq mi)
- Elevation: 404.4 m (1,327 ft)

Population (2002)
  - Total: 28

Mevce (pronounced [ˈmeːwtsɛ]; in older sources also Melce, German: Mewze) is a small dispersed settlement in the hills west of Muljava in the Municipality of Ivančna Gorica in central Slovenia. The area is part of the historical region of Lower Carniola. The municipality is now included in the Central Slovenia Statistical Region.
