= Sela pri Višnji Gori =

Sela pri Višnji Gori Sela (until 1953)
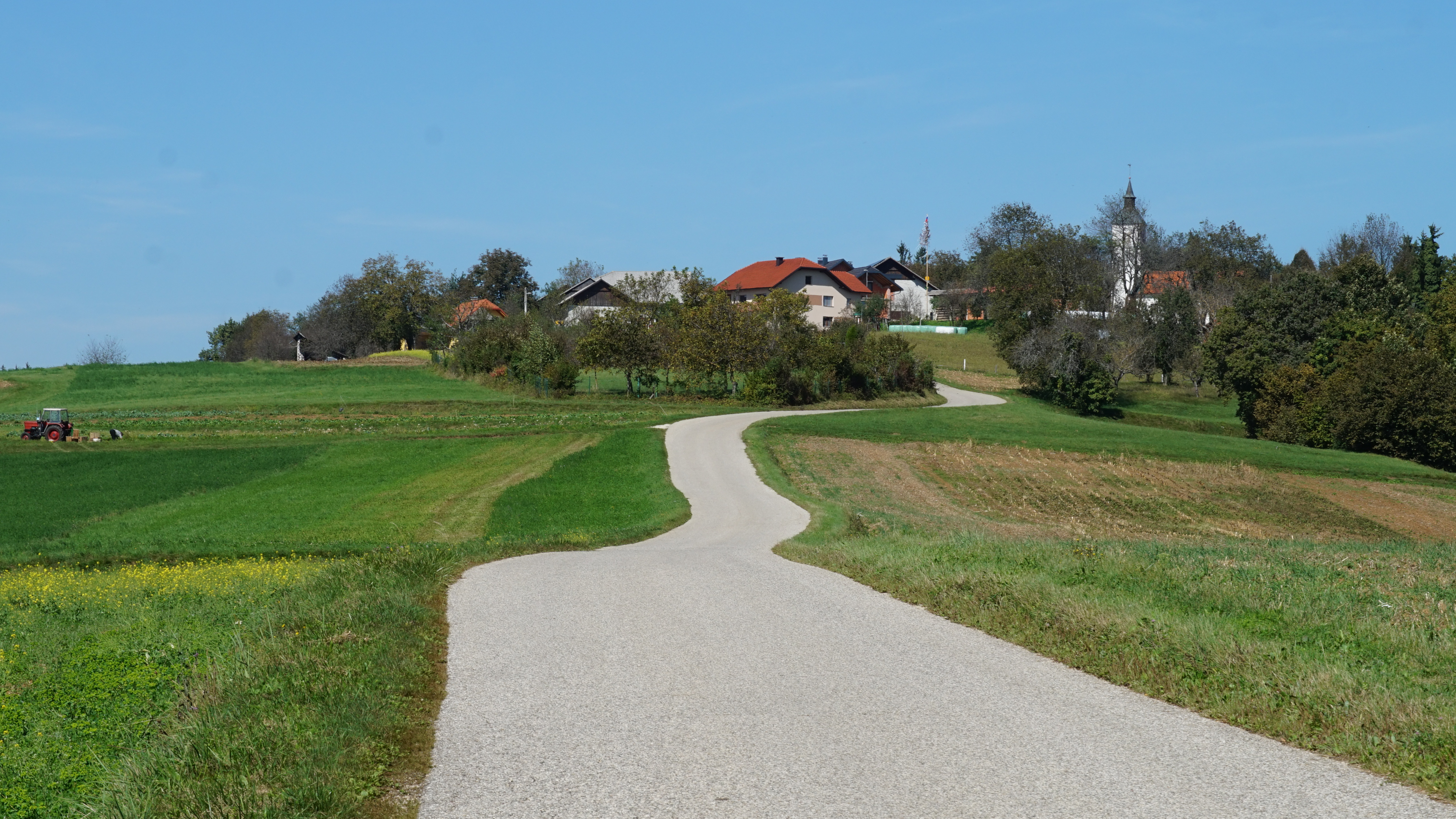

- Location in Slovenia
- Coordinates: 45°58′40.8″N 14°46′23.67″E
- Country: Slovenia
- Traditional region: Lower Carniola
- Statistical region: Central Slovenia
- Municipality: Ivančna Gorica

Area
  - Total: 2.37 km^{2} (0.92 sq mi)
- Elevation: 655.1 m (2,149 ft)

Population (2002)
  - Total: 46

Sela pri Višnji Gori (pronounced [ˈseːla pɾi ˈʋiːʃnji ˈɡɔːɾi]) is a small village in the hills northeast of Višnja Gora in the Municipality of Ivančna Gorica in central Slovenia. The area is part of the historical region of Lower Carniola. The municipality is now included in the Central Slovenia Statistical Region.

== Name ==
The name of the settlement was changed from Sela to Sela pri Višnji Gori in 1953.

== Church ==
The local church is dedicated to Saint George (Slovene: sveti Jurij) and belongs to the Parish of Višnja Gora. It dates to the second half of the 15th century.
