= Velike Vrhe =

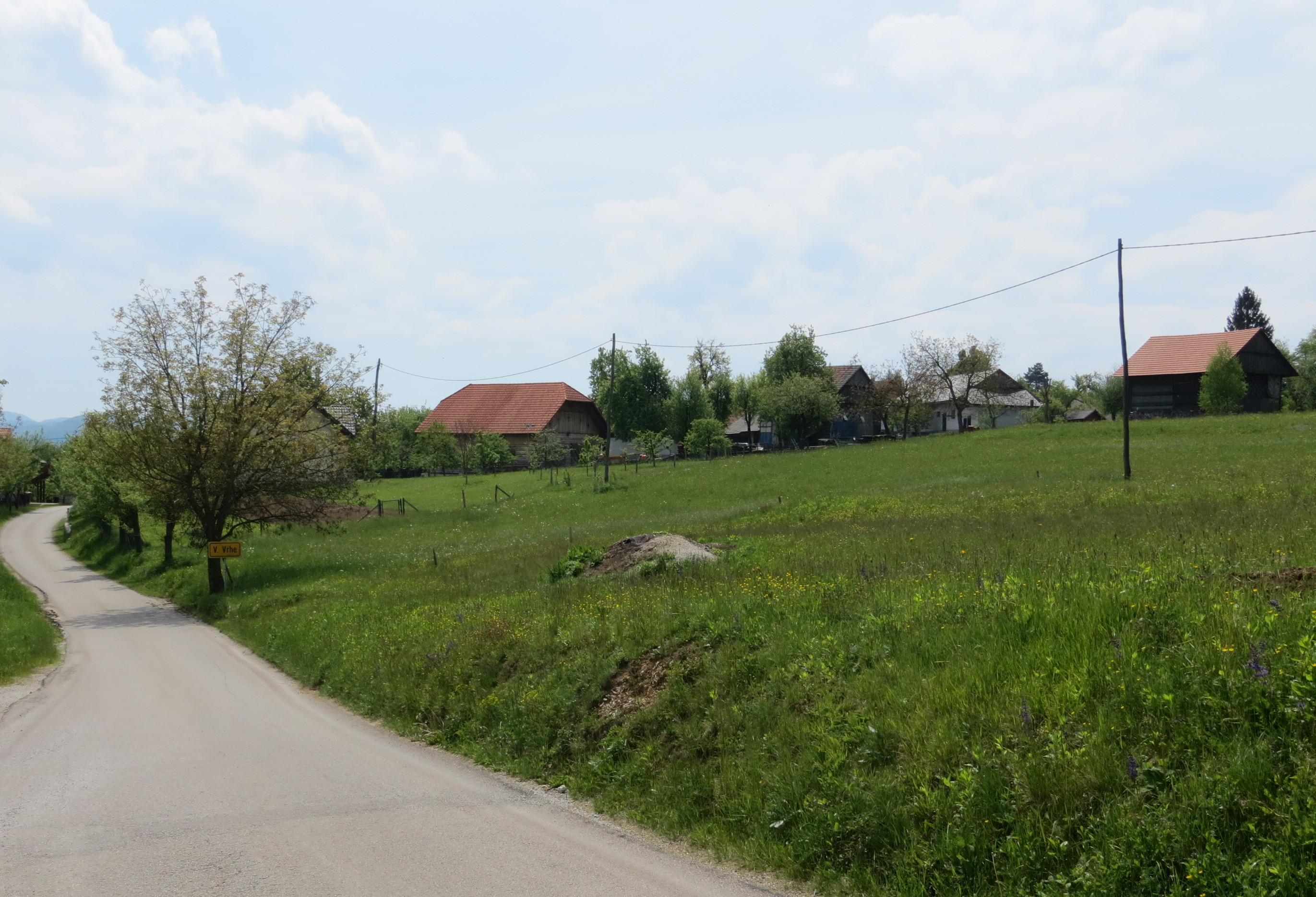

- Location in Slovenia
- Coordinates: 45°54′41.38″N 14°46′3.29″E
- Country: Slovenia
- Traditional region: Lower Carniola
- Statistical region: Central Slovenia
- Municipality: Ivančna Gorica

Area
  - Total: 2.79 km^{2} (1.08 sq mi)
- Elevation: 505.6 m (1,659 ft)

Population (2002)
  - Total: 44

Velike Vrhe (pronounced [ˈʋeːlikɛ ʋəɾˈxe]; in older sources also Veliki Vrhi, German: Großgupf) is a settlement in the hills west of Muljava in the Municipality of Ivančna Gorica in central Slovenia. The area is part of the historical region of Lower Carniola. The municipality is now included in the Central Slovenia Statistical Region.

A small roadside chapel-shrine in the centre of the settlement is dedicated to the Virgin Mary and was built in the early 20th century.
