= Mleščevo =

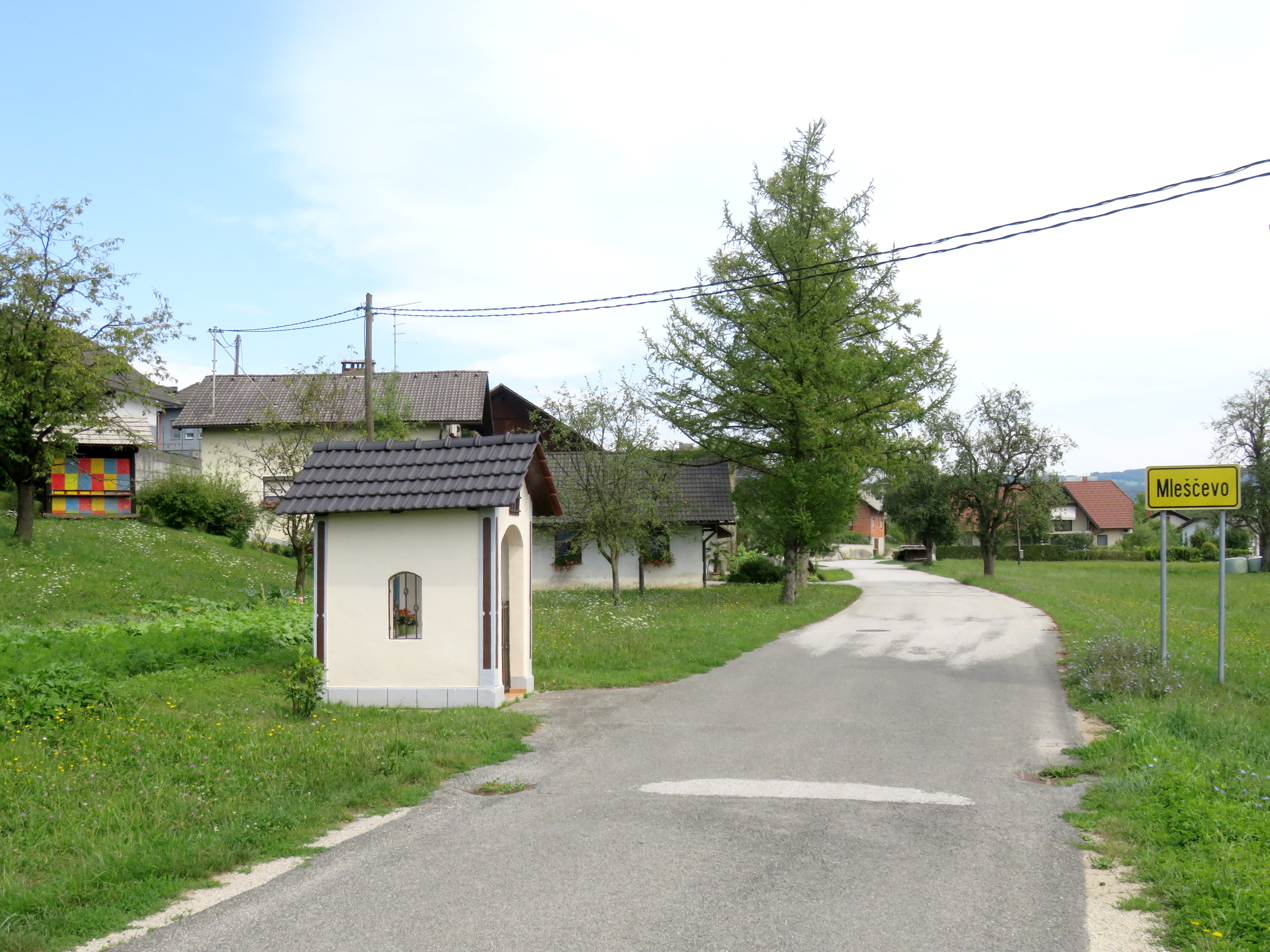

- Location in Slovenia
- Coordinates: 45°55′53.85″N 14°48′6.47″E
- Country: Slovenia
- Traditional region: Lower Carniola
- Statistical region: Central Slovenia
- Municipality: Ivančna Gorica

Area
  - Total: 0.56 km^{2} (0.22 sq mi)
- Elevation: 325.1 m (1,067 ft)

Population (2002)
  - Total: 103

Mleščevo (pronounced [ˈmleːʃtʃɛʋɔ]; German: Mleschow) is a small settlement just south of Ivančna Gorica in central Slovenia. The area is part of the historical region of Lower Carniola. The Municipality of Ivančna Gorica is now included in the Central Slovenia Statistical Region.
