= Čagošče =

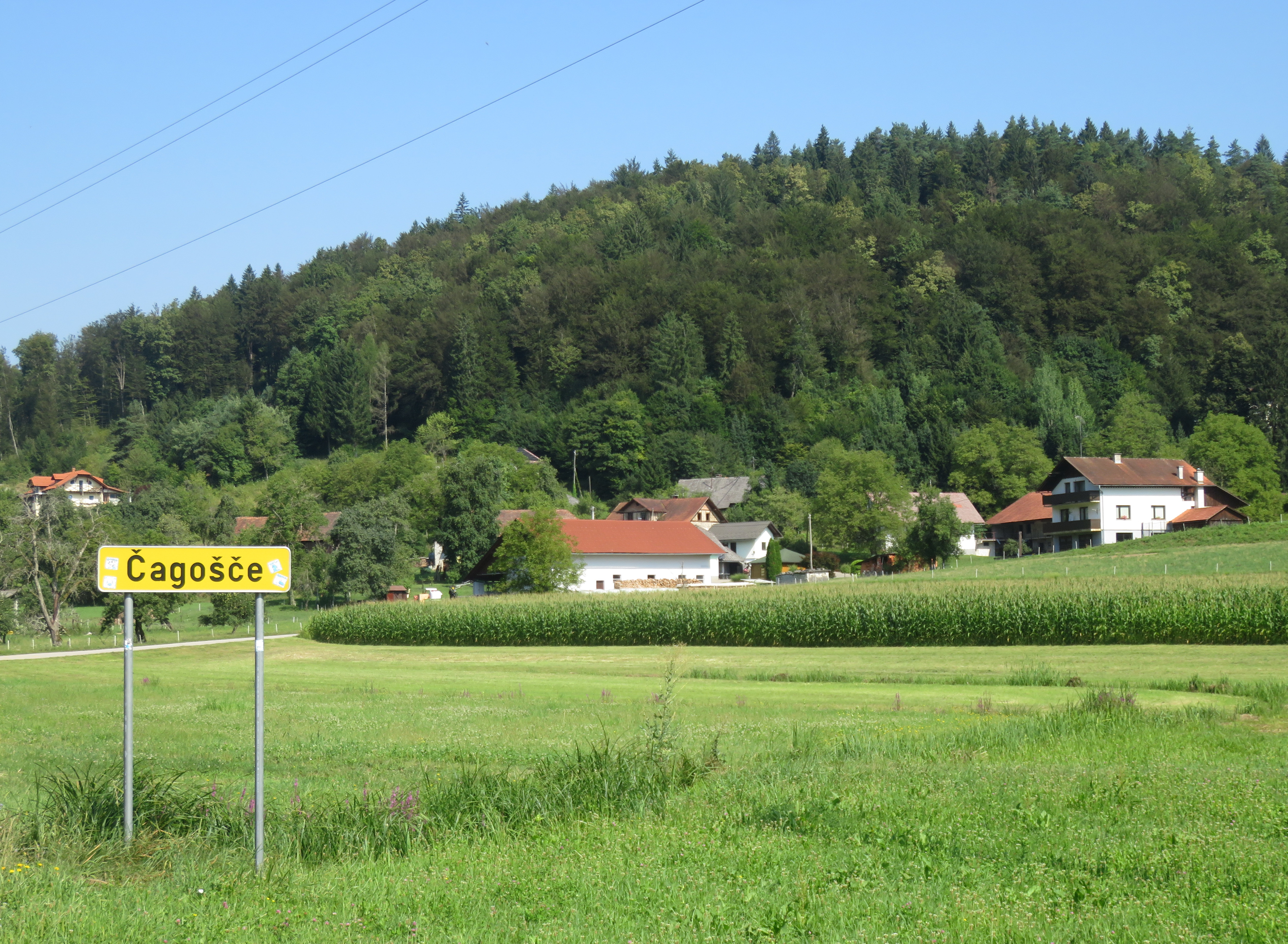

- Location in Slovenia
- Coordinates: 45°58′38.1″N 14°52′7.48″E
- Country: Slovenia
- Traditional region: Lower Carniola
- Statistical region: Central Slovenia
- Municipality: Ivančna Gorica

Area
  - Total: 1.3 km^{2} (0.50 sq mi)
- Elevation: 343.9 m (1,128 ft)

Population (2002)
  - Total: 50

Čagošče (pronounced [ˈtʃaːɡɔʃtʃɛ]) is a small settlement northeast of Šentvid pri Stični in the Municipality of Ivančna Gorica in central Slovenia. The area is part of the historical region of Lower Carniola and is now included in the Central Slovenia Statistical Region.
