= Male Vrhe =

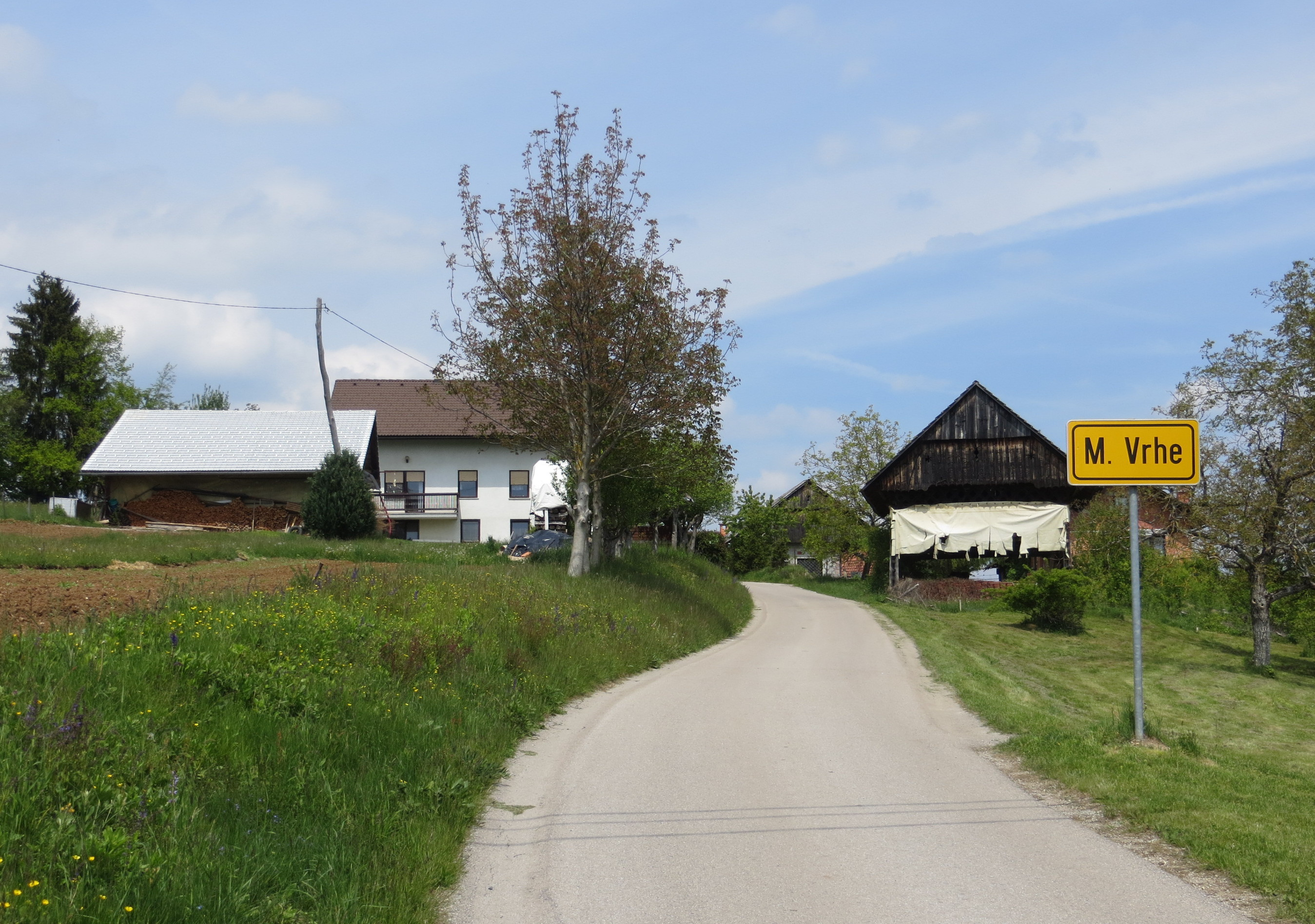

- Location in Slovenia
- Coordinates: 45°54′51.75″N 14°46′5.1″E
- Country: Slovenia
- Traditional region: Lower Carniola
- Statistical region: Central Slovenia
- Municipality: Ivančna Gorica

Area
  - Total: 0.82 km^{2} (0.32 sq mi)
- Elevation: 519.2 m (1,703 ft)

Population (2002)
  - Total: 24

Male Vrhe (pronounced [ˈmaːlɛ ʋəɾˈxeː]; in older sources also Mali Vrhi, German: Kleingupf) is a small settlement in the hills west of Muljava in the Municipality of Ivančna Gorica in central Slovenia. The municipality is included in the Central Slovenia Statistical Region. The area is part of the historical region of Lower Carniola.
