= Marinča Vas =

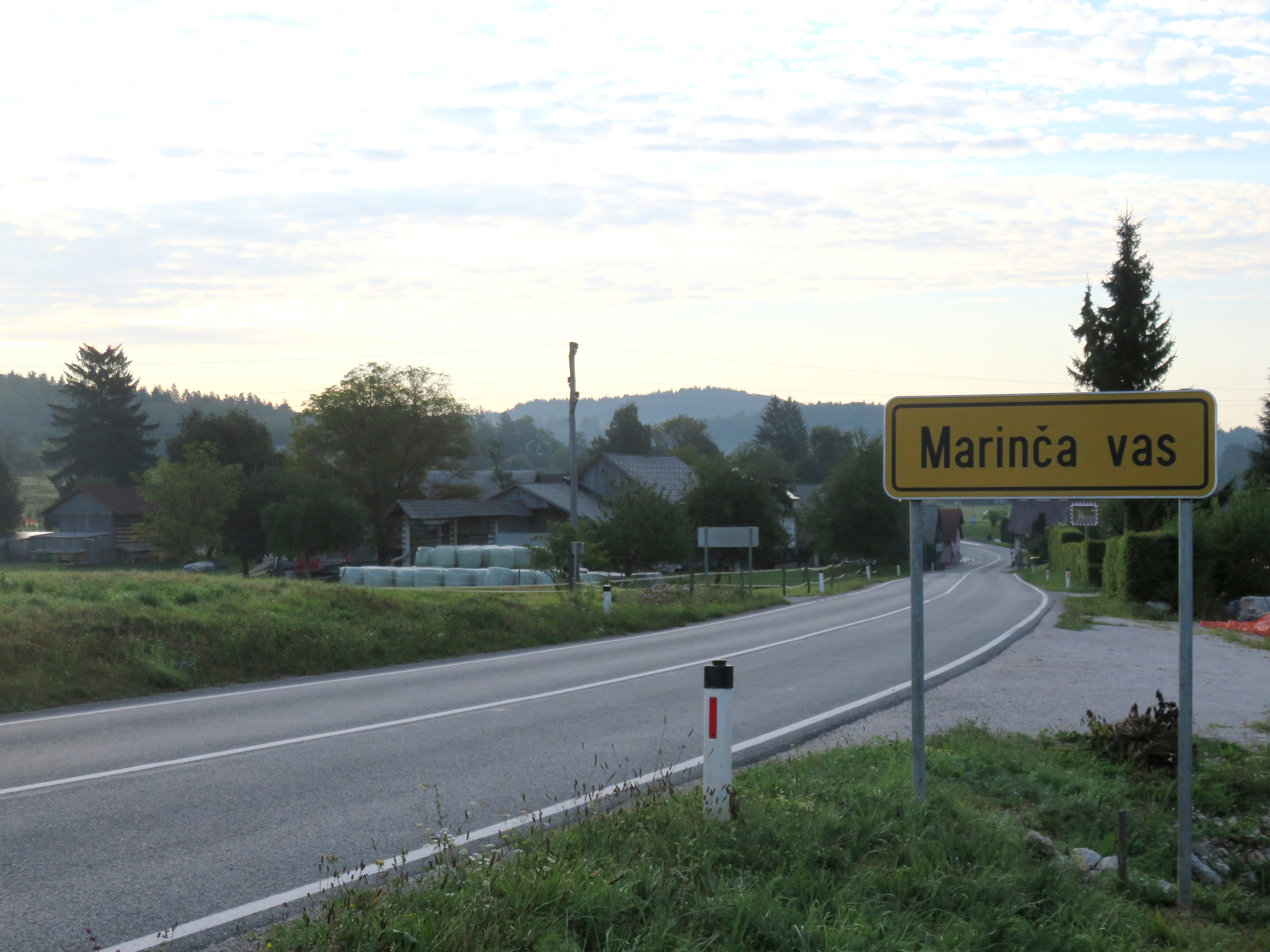

- Location in Slovenia
- Coordinates: 45°52′15.95″N 14°49′10.77″E
- Country: Slovenia
- Traditional region: Lower Carniola
- Statistical region: Central Slovenia
- Municipality: Ivančna Gorica

Area
  - Total: 1.49 km^{2} (0.58 sq mi)
- Elevation: 264.8 m (869 ft)

Population (2002)
  - Total: 110

Marinča Vas (pronounced [maˈɾiːntʃa ˈʋaːs]; Slovene: Marinča vas) is a settlement on the left bank of the Krka River in the Municipality of Ivančna Gorica in central Slovenia. The area is part of the historical region of Lower Carniola. The municipality is now included in the Central Slovenia Statistical Region.
