= Breg pri Temenici =

Breg pri Temenici Breg (until 1955) Breg pri Velikem Gabru (1955–1997)
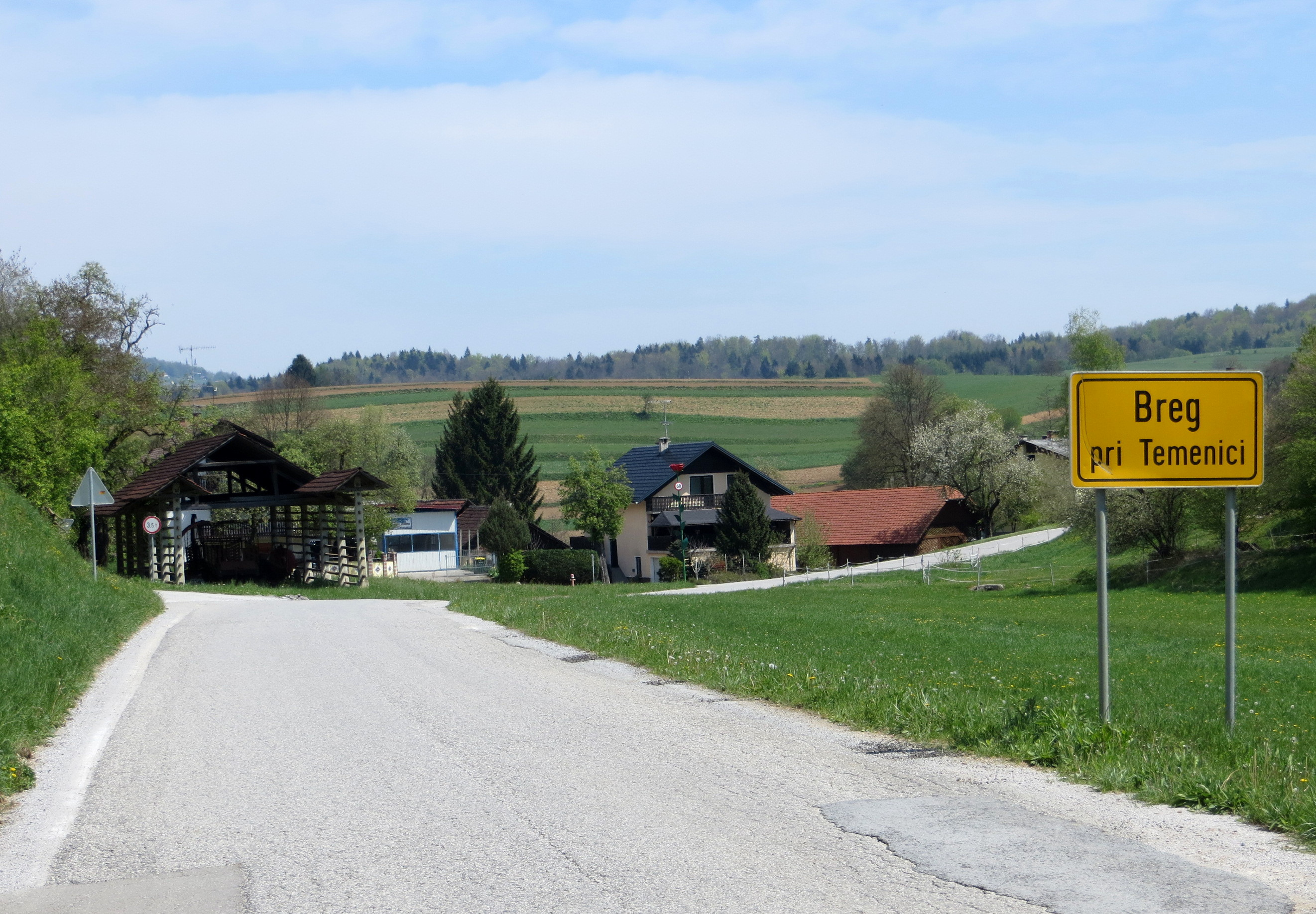

- Location in Slovenia
- Coordinates: 45°56′56.82″N 14°53′54.99″E
- Country: Slovenia
- Traditional region: Lower Carniola
- Statistical region: Central Slovenia
- Municipality: Ivančna Gorica

Area
  - Total: 0.62 km^{2} (0.24 sq mi)
- Elevation: 309.7 m (1,016 ft)

Population (2002)
  - Total: 45

Breg pri Temenici (pronounced [ˈbɾeːk pɾi ˈteːmɛnitsi]; German: Rann) is a settlement on the right bank of the Temenica River in the Municipality of Ivančna Gorica in central Slovenia. The railway line from Ljubljana to Novo Mesto runs just south of the settlement. The area is part of the historical region of Lower Carniola. The municipality is now included in the Central Slovenia Statistical Region.

== Name ==
Breg pri Temenici was attested in written sources as Rain in 1361, Rain bey Temenicz in 1369, and Temenicz an dem Rain in 1436, among other spellings. The name of the settlement was changed from Breg to Breg pri Velikem Gabru in 1955. The name was changed again in 1997 to Breg pri Temenici. In the past the German name was Rann.
