= Malo Črnelo =

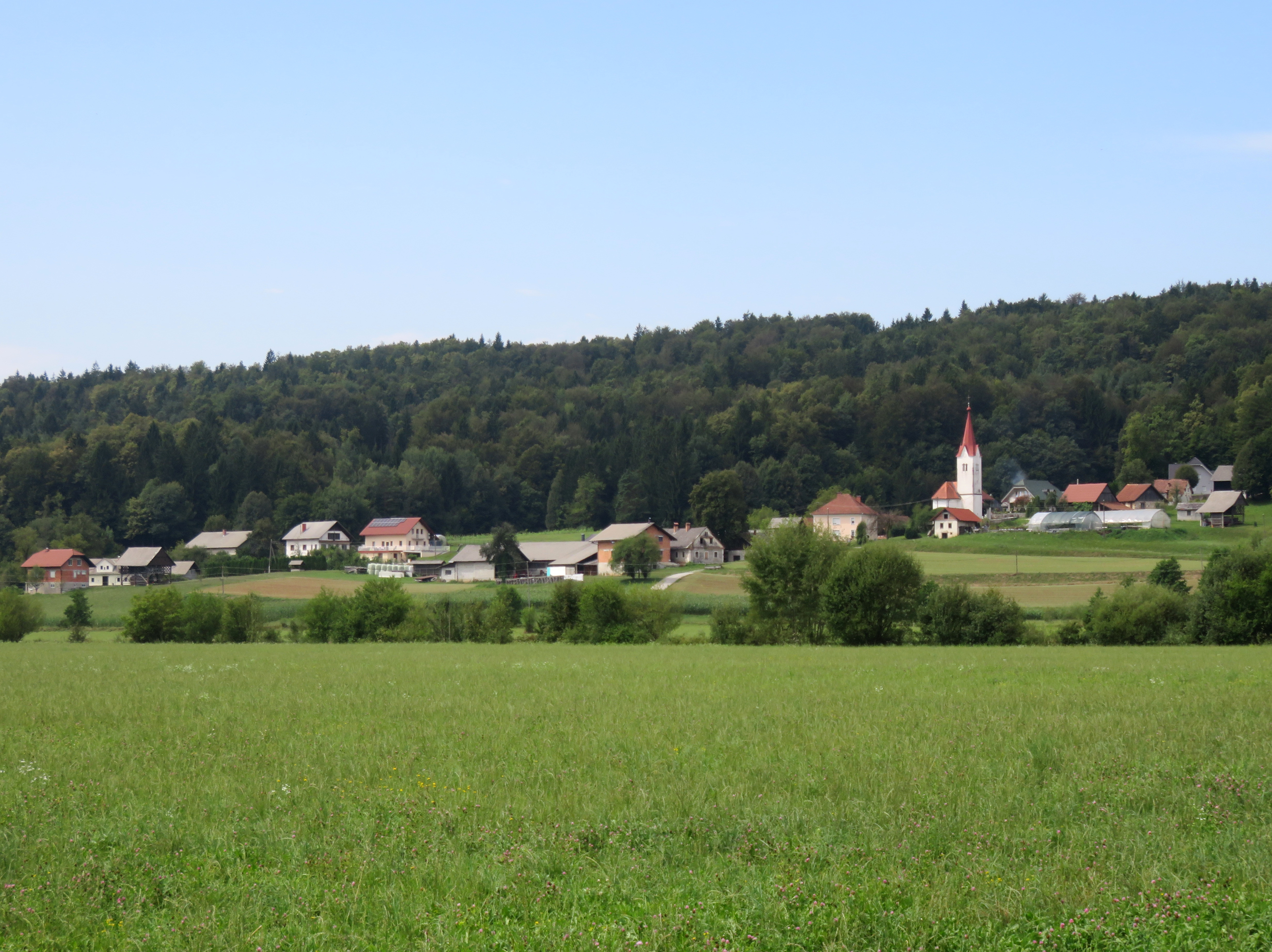

- Location in Slovenia
- Coordinates: 45°55′19.81″N 14°47′50.81″E
- Country: Slovenia
- Traditional region: Lower Carniola
- Statistical region: Central Slovenia
- Municipality: Ivančna Gorica

Area
  - Total: 1.32 km^{2} (0.51 sq mi)
- Elevation: 331.2 m (1,087 ft)

Population (2002)
  - Total: 41

Malo Črnelo (pronounced [ˈmaːlɔ tʃəɾˈneːlɔ]; German: Kleintschernelo) is a small village in the Municipality of Ivančna Gorica in central Slovenia. It lies between Ivančna Gorica and Muljava in the historical region of Lower Carniola. The municipality is now included in the Central Slovenia Statistical Region.

== Church ==
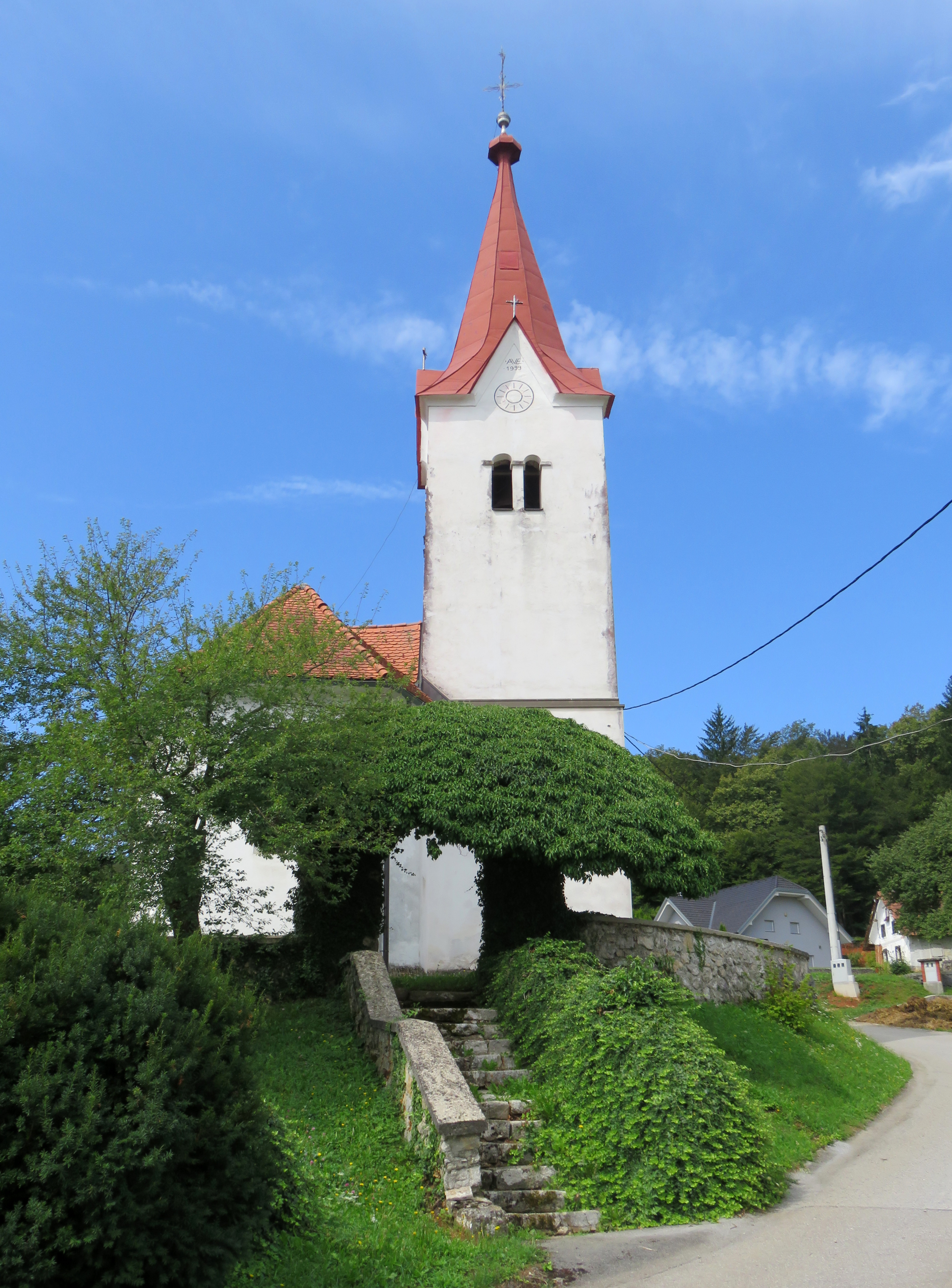
Saint Margaret's Church

The local church is dedicated to Saint Margaret (Slovene: sveta Marjeta) and belongs to the Parish of Ivančna Gorica. It was originally a Romanesque building that was extensively rebuilt in the 15th and 18th centuries.
