= Velike Češnjice =

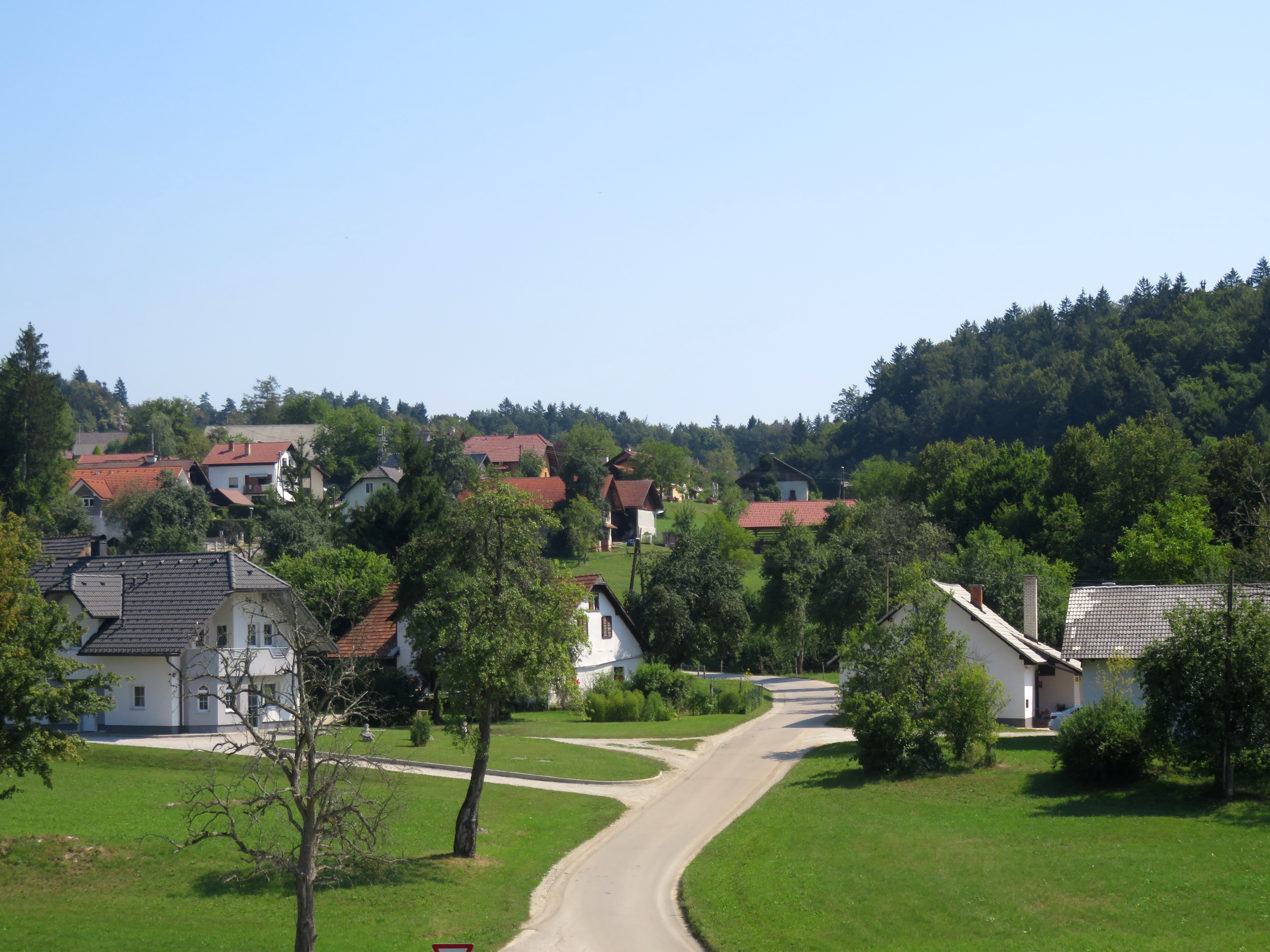

- Location in Slovenia
- Coordinates: 45°57′53.61″N 14°50′41.65″E
- Country: Slovenia
- Traditional region: Lower Carniola
- Statistical region: Central Slovenia
- Municipality: Ivančna Gorica

Area
  - Total: 1.54 km^{2} (0.59 sq mi)
- Elevation: 364 m (1,194 ft)

Population (2002)
  - Total: 185

Velike Češnjice (pronounced [ˈʋeːlikɛ ˈtʃeːʃnjitsɛ]; in older sources also Velike Črešnjice, German: Großtscheschenze) is a village northeast of Šentvid pri Stični in the Municipality of Ivančna Gorica in central Slovenia. The area is part of the historical region of Lower Carniola. The municipality is now included in the Central Slovenia Statistical Region.

== Church ==
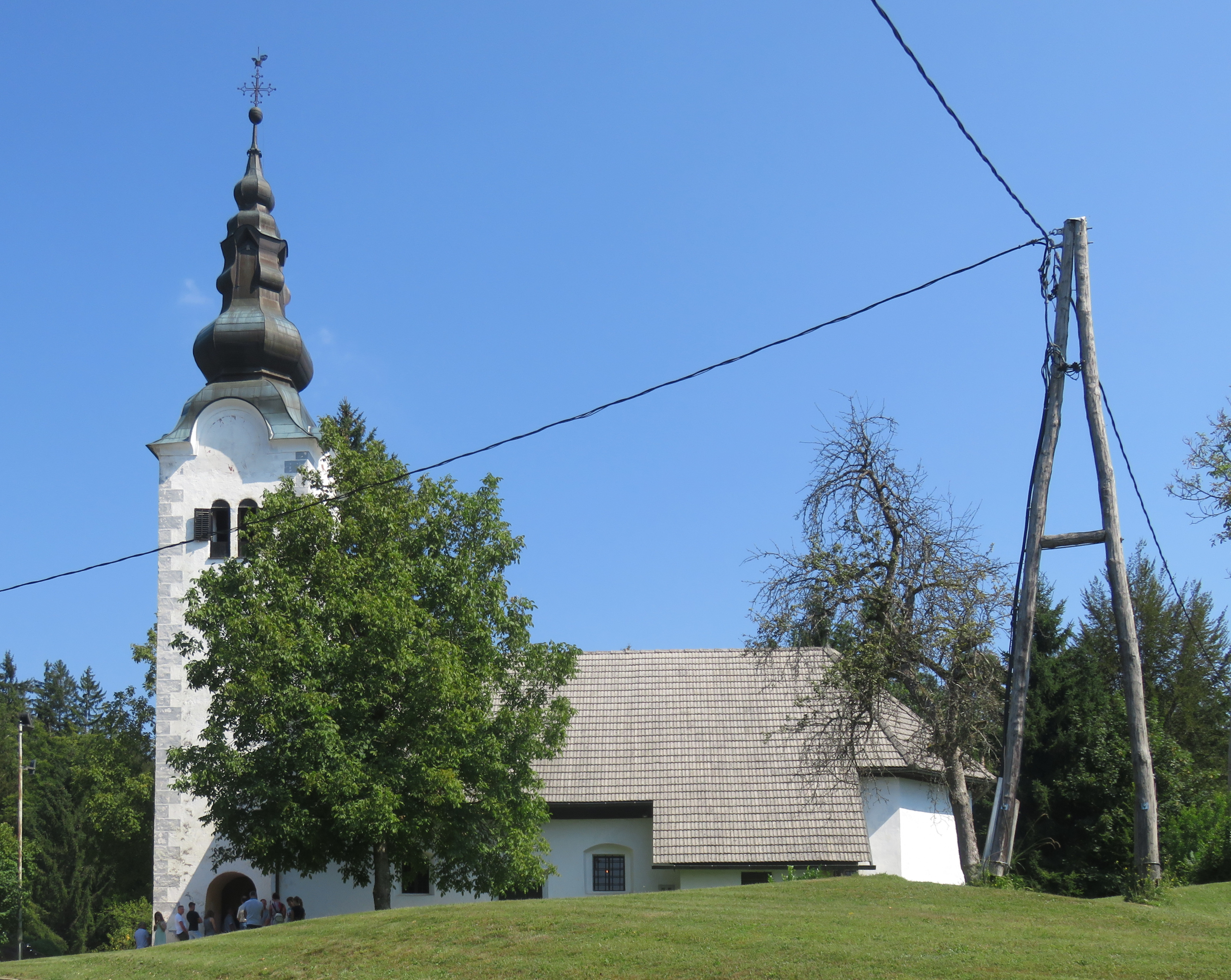
Saint Anne's Church

The local church built in the northern part of the settlement is dedicated to Saint Anne and belongs to the Parish of Šentvid pri Stični. It was originally a Romanesque and was restyled in the Baroque in the 18th century.
