= Breg pri Dobu =

Breg pri Dobu Breg (until 1953)
- Location in Slovenia
- Coordinates: 45°56′11.67″N 14°51′53.89″E
- Country: Slovenia
- Traditional region: Lower Carniola
- Statistical region: Central Slovenia
- Municipality: Ivančna Gorica

Area
  - Total: 0.21 km^{2} (0.081 sq mi)
- Elevation: 313.2 m (1,028 ft)

Population (2002)
  - Total: 13

Breg pri Dobu (pronounced [ˈbɾeːk pɾi ˈdoːbu]) is a small settlement just north of Dob pri Šentvidu in the Municipality of Ivančna Gorica in central Slovenia. The area is part of the historical region of Lower Carniola. The municipality is now included in the Central Slovenia Statistical Region.

== Name ==
Breg pri Dobu was attested in historical sources as Rain in 1389 and Rayn in 1424. The name of the settlement was changed from Breg to Breg pri Dobu in 1953.
