= Češnjice pri Zagradcu =

Češnjice pri Zagradcu Češnjice (until 1955)
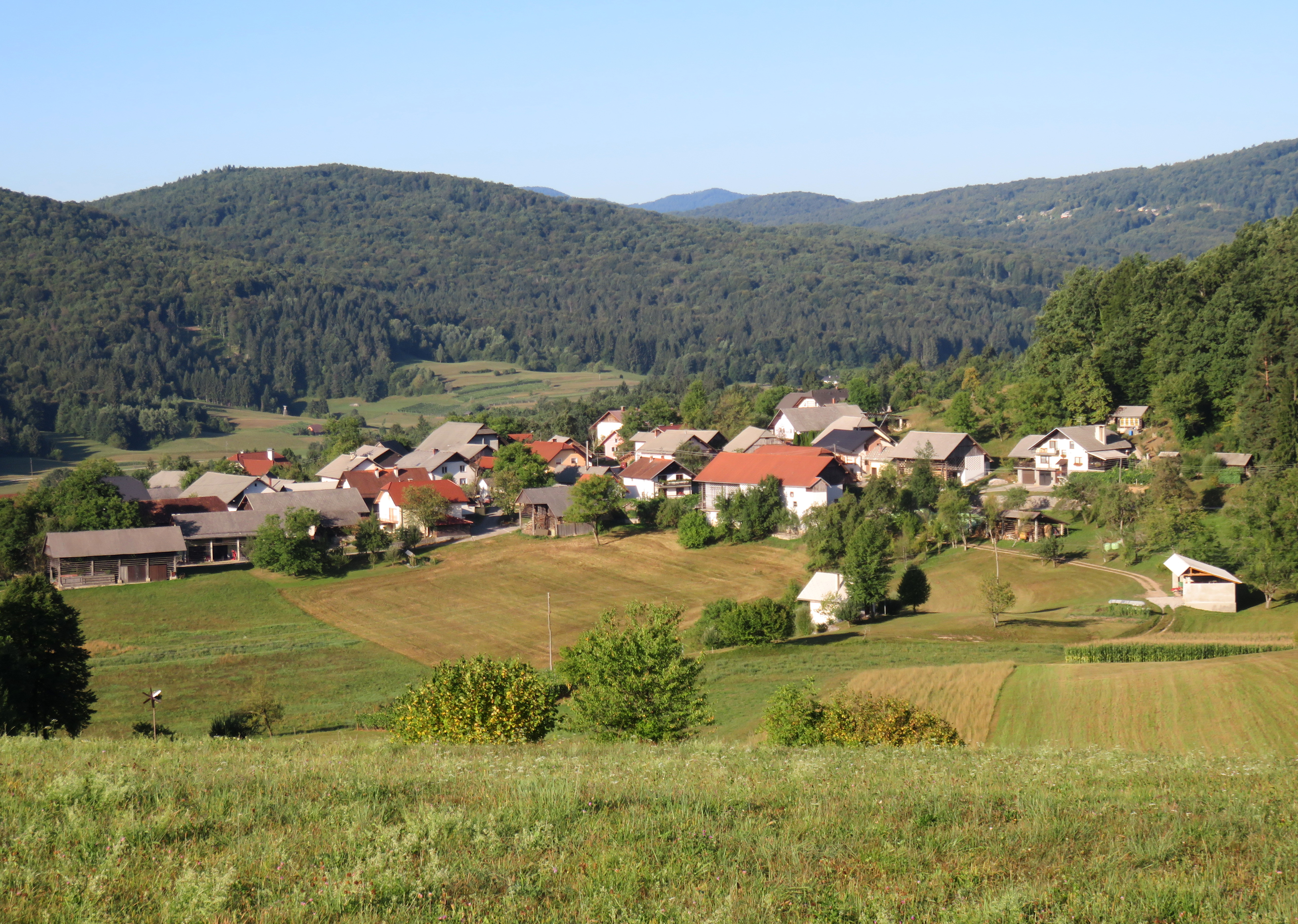

- Location in Slovenia
- Coordinates: 45°51′40.83″N 14°51′1.27″E
- Country: Slovenia
- Traditional region: Lower Carniola
- Statistical region: Central Slovenia
- Municipality: Ivančna Gorica

Area
  - Total: 0.79 km^{2} (0.31 sq mi)
- Elevation: 308.6 m (1,012 ft)

Population (2002)
  - Total: 87

Češnjice pri Zagradcu (pronounced [ˈtʃeːʃnjitsɛ pɾi zaˈɡɾaːtsu]) is a settlement east of Zagradec in the Municipality of Ivančna Gorica in central Slovenia. The area is part of the historical region of Lower Carniola. The municipality is now included in the Central Slovenia Statistical Region.

== Name ==
The name of the settlement was changed from Češnjice to Češnjice pri Zagradcu in 1955.
