= Male Rebrce =

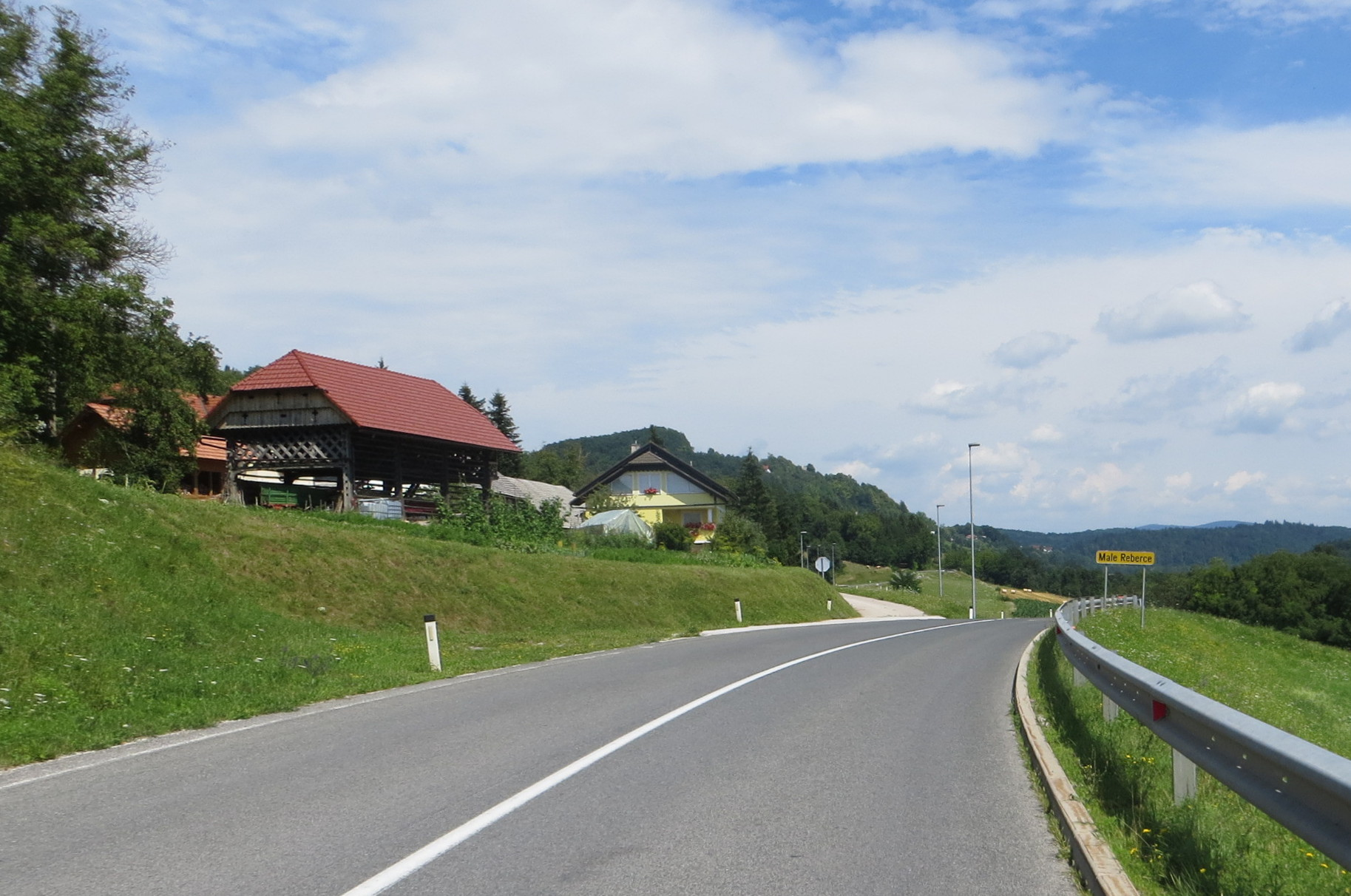

- Location in Slovenia
- Coordinates: 45°51′26.95″N 14°52′8.48″E
- Country: Slovenia
- Traditional region: Lower Carniola
- Statistical region: Central Slovenia
- Municipality: Ivančna Gorica

Area
  - Total: 0.3 km^{2} (0.12 sq mi)
- Elevation: 266.3 m (874 ft)

Population (2002)
  - Total: 33

Male Rebrce (pronounced [ˈmaːlɛ ˈɾeːbəɾtsɛ]) is a small settlement on the left bank of the Krka River in the Municipality of Ivančna Gorica in central Slovenia. The area is part of the historical region of Lower Carniola. The municipality is now included in the Central Slovenia Statistical Region.
