= Bojanji Vrh =

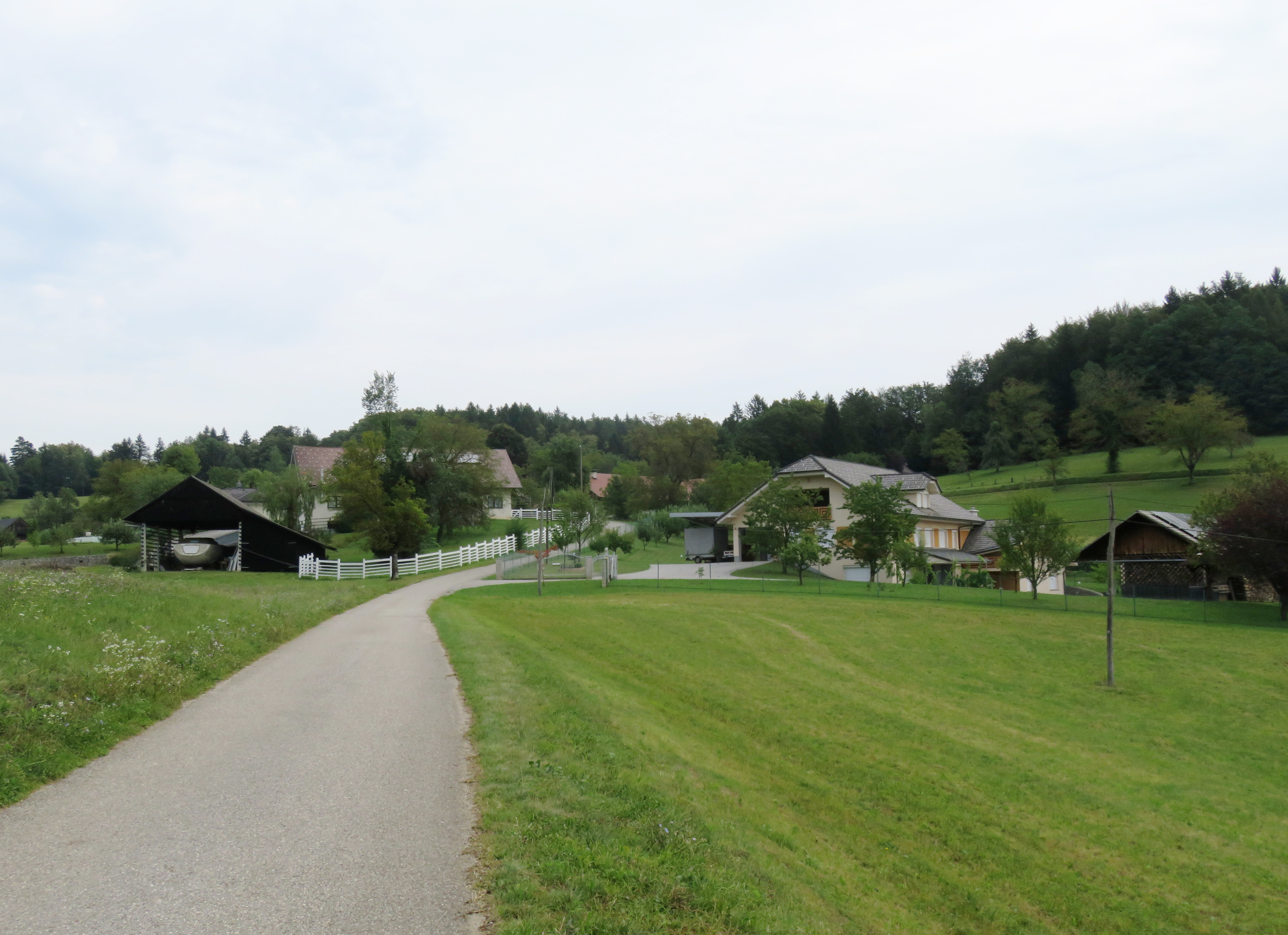

- Location in Slovenia
- Coordinates: 45°54′38.16″N 14°49′12.63″E
- Country: Slovenia
- Traditional region: Lower Carniola
- Statistical region: Central Slovenia
- Municipality: Ivančna Gorica

Area
  - Total: 0.97 km^{2} (0.37 sq mi)
- Elevation: 350.2 m (1,149 ft)

Population (2002)
  - Total: 51

Bojanji Vrh (pronounced [bɔˈjaːnji ˈʋəɾx]; German: Bojanwerch) is a small settlement northeast of Muljava in the Municipality of Ivančna Gorica in central Slovenia. The area is part of the historical region of Lower Carniola. The municipality is now included in the Central Slovenia Statistical Region.

== Name ==
Bojanji Vrh was attested in written sources as Boyansperg in 1323, Poyansperg in 1324, Geyensperg in 1338, and Woyensperg in 1350, among other spellings.
