= Boga Vas =

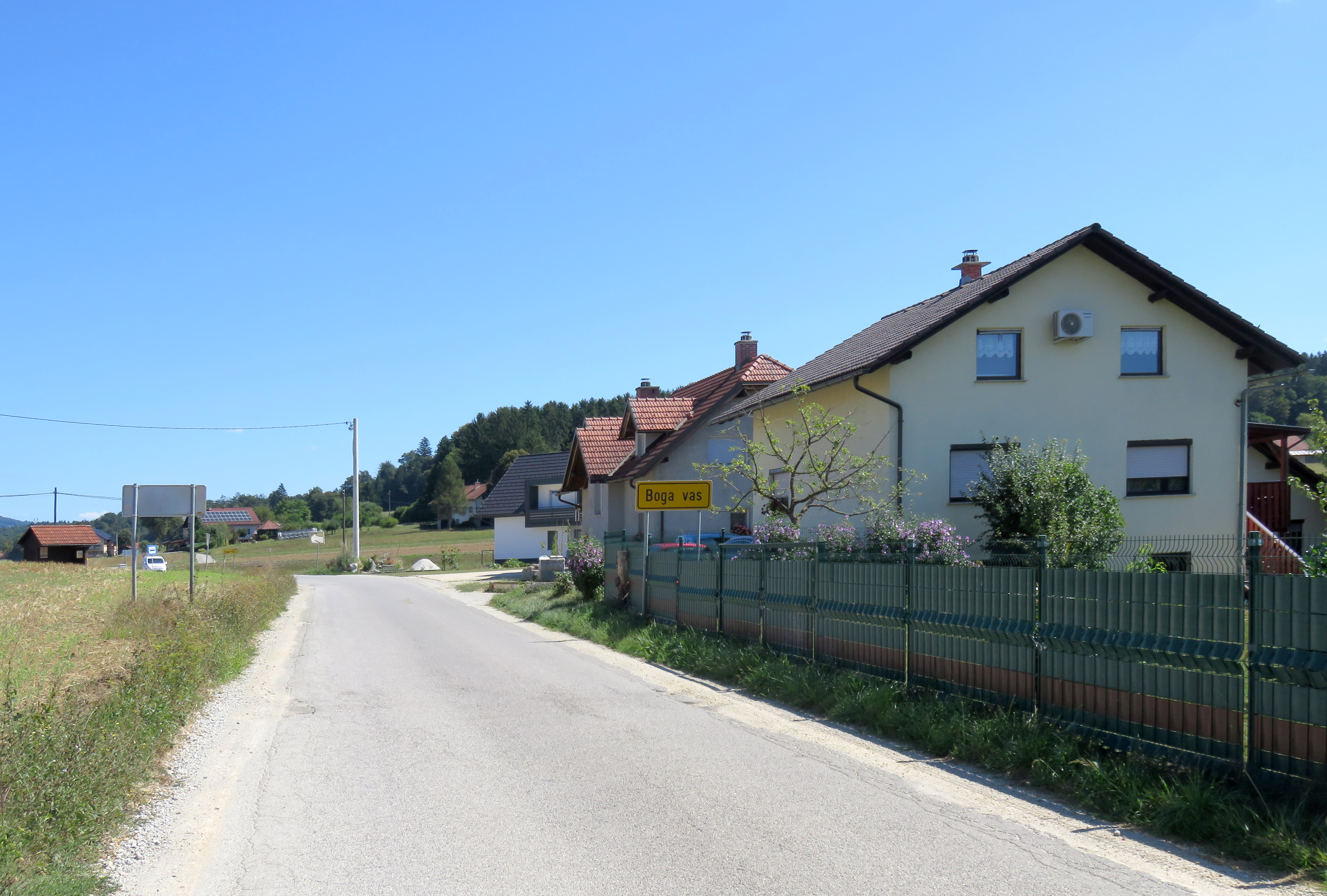

- Location in Slovenia
- Coordinates: 45°56′1.98″N 14°52′23.16″E
- Country: Slovenia
- Traditional region: Lower Carniola
- Statistical region: Central Slovenia
- Municipality: Ivančna Gorica

Area
  - Total: 0.24 km^{2} (0.093 sq mi)
- Elevation: 314.4 m (1,031 ft)

Population (2002)
  - Total: 32

Boga Vas (pronounced [ˈboːɡa ˈʋaːs]; Slovene: Boga vas) is a small settlement in the Municipality of Ivančna Gorica in central Slovenia. It lies just east of Dob pri Šentvidu in the historical region of Lower Carniola. The municipality is now included in the Central Slovenia Statistical Region.
