= Kriška Vas =

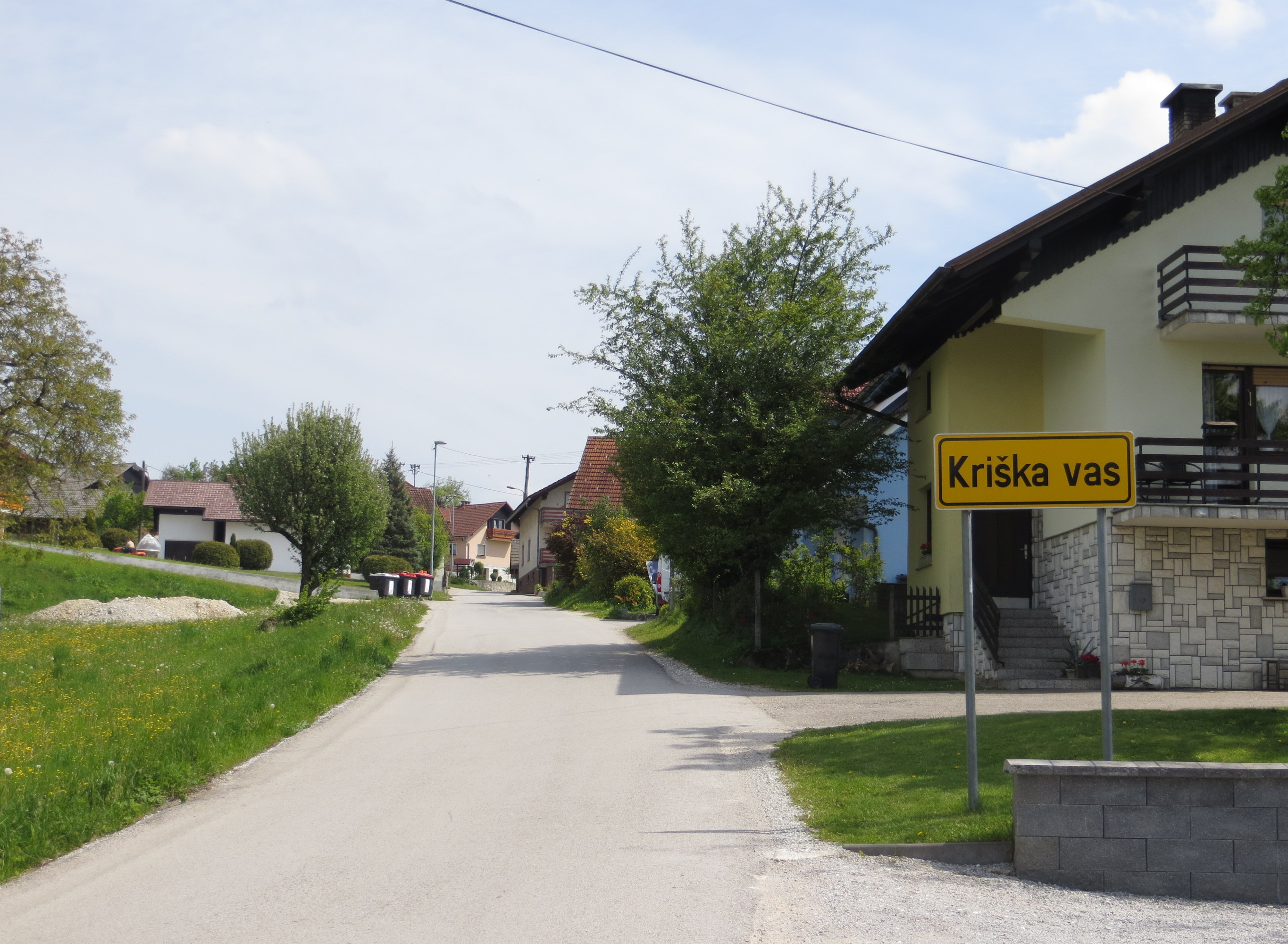

- Location in Slovenia
- Coordinates: 45°56′30.96″N 14°44′16.51″E
- Country: Slovenia
- Traditional region: Lower Carniola
- Statistical region: Central Slovenia
- Municipality: Ivančna Gorica

Area
  - Total: 1.84 km^{2} (0.71 sq mi)
- Elevation: 562.1 m (1,844 ft)

Population (2002)
  - Total: 133

Kriška Vas (pronounced [ˈkɾiːʃka ˈʋaːs]; Slovene: Kriška vas, in older sources also Križna Vas, German: Kreuzdorf) is a village south of Višnja Gora in the municipality of Ivančna Gorica in central Slovenia. The area is part of the historical region of Lower Carniola. The municipality is now included in the Central Slovenia Statistical Region.

== Name ==
Kriška Vas was attested in written sources as Chreuczdorff in 1436, Krewczdorff in 1439, and Krewczestorff in 1456, among other spellings. The name is derived from the common noun križ 'cross'. Because old attestations of the name do not contain the adjective 'holy' (i.e., Slovene sveti or German heilig), this probably does not refer to a wayside cross or chapel, but instead to a geographical feature, such as a crossroads or intersecting ridges. North of the village, at Kriška Vas Hill (Slovene: Kriški hrib, elevation 503 meters or 1,650 feet), ridges of hills intersect from the west, south, and east.

== Church ==
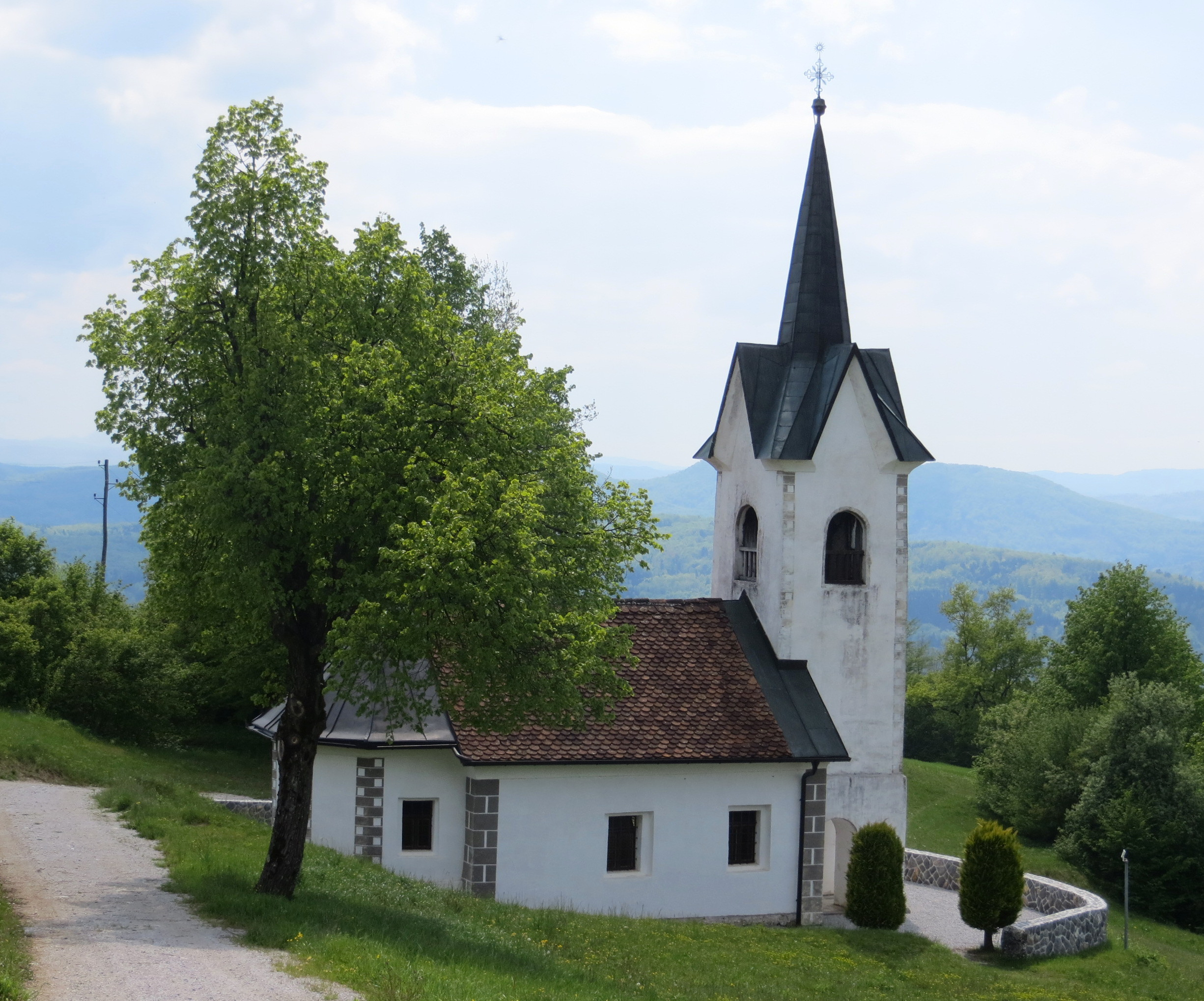
Mary Magdalene Church

The local church is dedicated to Mary Magdalene and belongs to the parish of Višnja Gora. It was built in the 16th century and was partially rebuilt in the 17th century.
