= Goričica =

Goričica may refer to:

In Croatia:

- Goričica, Croatia

In Slovenia:

- Goričica, Šentjur, a settlement in the Municipality of Šentjur
- Goričica pod Krimom, a settlement in the Municipality of Brezovica (known as Goričica until 1953)
- Goričica pri Ihanu, a settlement in the Municipality of Domžale (known as Goričica until 1953)
- Goričica pri Moravčah, a settlement in the Municipality of Moravče (known as Goričica until 1955)
- Mala Goričica, a settlement in the Municipality of Ivančna Gorica (known as Goričica until 1955)
