= Podplešivica =

- Location in Slovenia
- Coordinates: 46°0′2.12″N 14°22′58.27″E
- Country: Slovenia
- Traditional region: Inner Carniola
- Statistical region: Central Slovenia
- Municipality: Brezovica

Area
  - Total: 3.84 km^{2} (1.48 sq mi)
- Elevation: 288.6 m (947 ft)

Population (2020)
  - Total: 286
  - Density: 74.5/km^{2} (193/sq mi)
- Postal code: 1357

Podplešivica (pronounced [pɔtplɛˈʃiːʋitsa]) is a settlement in the Municipality of Brezovica in central Slovenia. It lies in the marshlands south of the capital Ljubljana between Notranje Gorice and Log pri Brezovici. The municipality is part of the traditional region of Inner Carniola and is now included in the Central Slovenia Statistical Region.

== History ==
Podplešivica was formerly a hamlet of Plešivica. It became an independent settlement in 1987.

== Kuschlan Manor ==
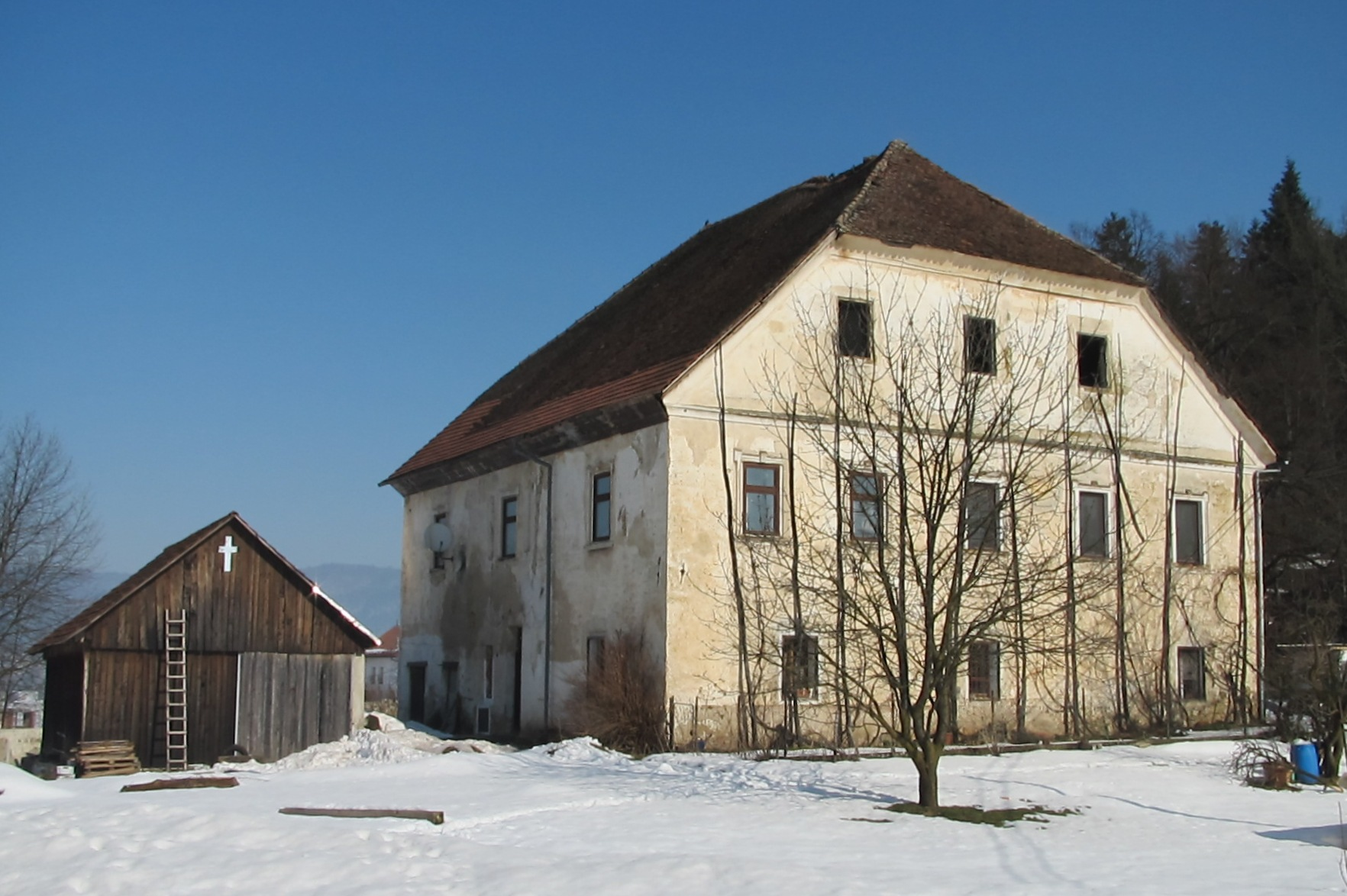
Kuschlan Manor

Podplešivica is the site of Kuschlan Manor (Slovene: Kušljanov grad), also known as Kršljan Manor (Kršljanov grad). The manor was built below Vrbič Hill (Vrbičev hrib) in 1453. Because the wet ground of the marsh made it accessible from only one side, the manor was also known as Za blatom (literally, 'behind the marsh', also Zaplata) in Slovene, or Moosthal in German. It was first owned by the Mavrič family, later by the Gallen family, and from 1663 to 1826 by the barons of the Kuschlan family. It was considerably damaged by the 1895 Ljubljana earthquake.
