= Brezovica pri Ljubljani =

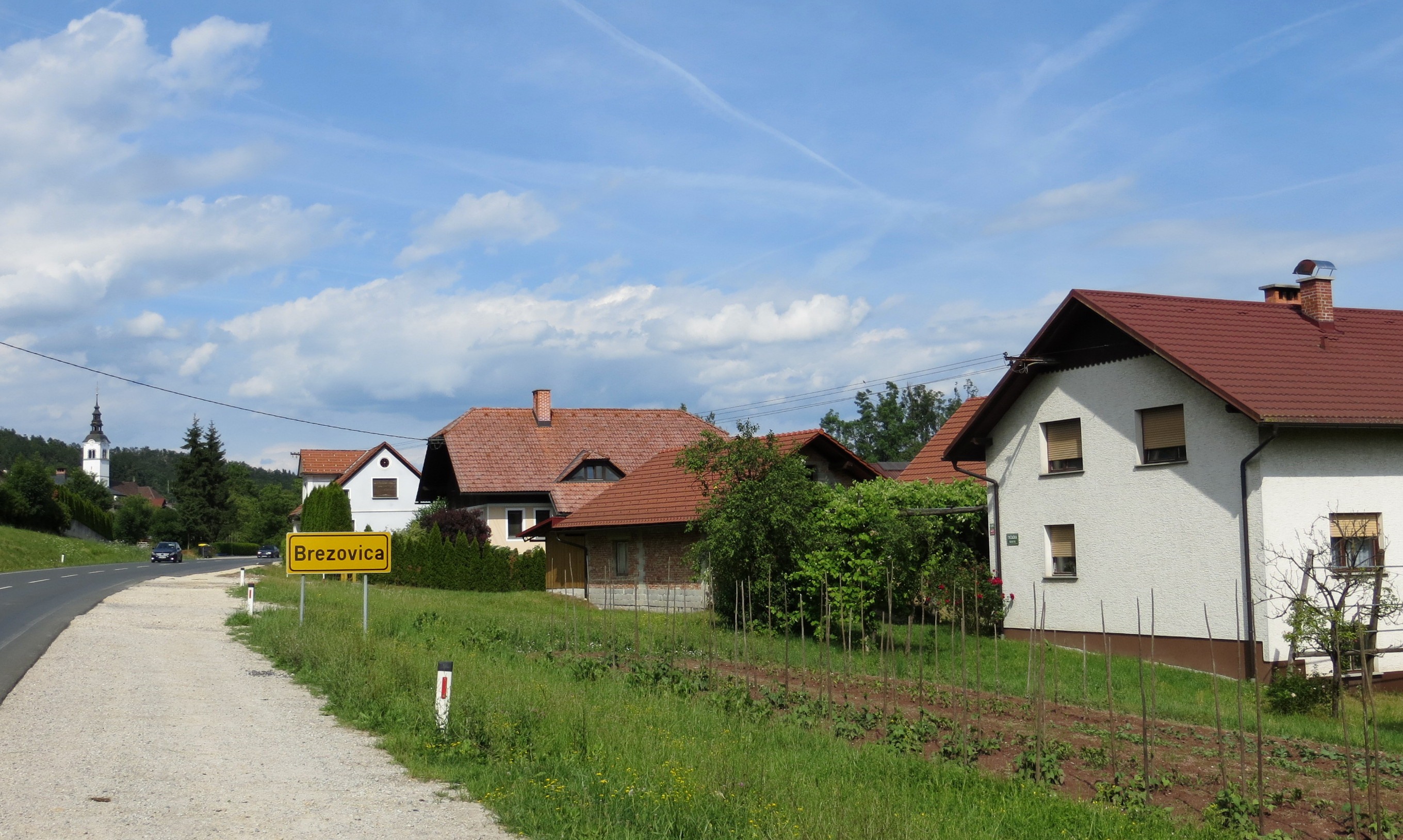

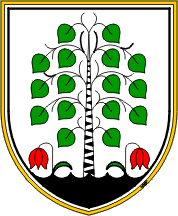
- Coat of arms

- Location in Slovenia
- Coordinates: 46°1′14.37″N 14°25′3.94″E
- Country: Slovenia
- Traditional region: Inner Carniola
- Statistical region: Central Slovenia
- Municipality: Brezovica

Area
  - Total: 6.6 km^{2} (2.5 sq mi)
- Elevation: 296 m (971 ft)

Population (2020)
  - Total: 3,221
  - Density: 490/km^{2} (1,300/sq mi)
- Postal code: 1351

Brezovica pri Ljubljani (pronounced [ˈbɾéːzɔʋitsa pɾi ljuˈbljàːni]; German: Bresowitz) is a settlement in the Municipality of Brezovica in central Slovenia. It is the administrative center of the municipality. The municipality is part of the traditional region of Inner Carniola and is now included in the Central Slovenia Statistical Region.

== Geography ==
Brezovica pri Ljubljani includes the hamlets of Bičevje along the road to Podpeč, Komarija along the former railroad to Vrhnika, Postaja along the road to the railroad station, Mala Vas (Slovene: Mala vas) along the old main road, and Radna in the valley of Radna Creek. The southern part of the settlement includes the Curnovec drainage canal, which was an early attempt to drain part of the local marshland. The canal was dug between 1762 and 1769 and is named after the tobacco magnate Franz Zorn von Mildenheim (1731–1790), who directed the work.

== Name ==
The name of the settlement was changed from Brezovica to Brezovica pri Ljubljani in 1953. In the past the German name was Bresowitz.

== Church ==
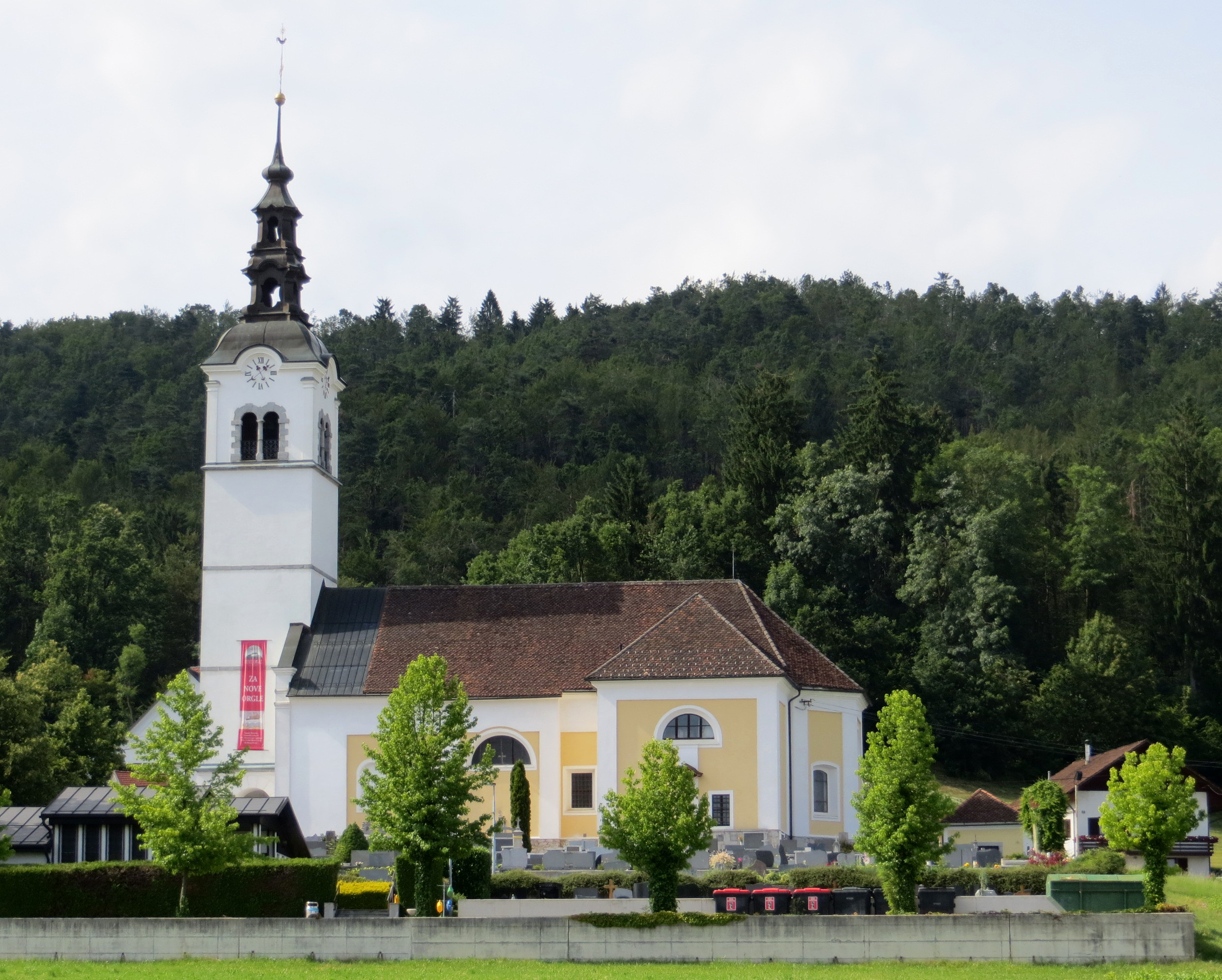
Saint Anthony the Great Church

The parish church in Brezovica pri Ljubljani is dedicated to Saint Anthony the Great. A church at the site was first mentioned in written sources in 1526. The current building dates from the second half of the 19th century and is a single-nave structure with a bell tower on the west side. The furnishings are also from the 19th century. The stonework was executed by Ivan Potrebuješ in 1865, and the paintings by Ivan Šubic in 1870 and Simon Ogrin in 1887. The clock on the bell tower is the work of Janez Pogačnik.

== Notable people ==
Notable people that were born or lived in Brezovica pri Ljubljani include:

- Leopold Belar (1828–1899), musician
- Simon Lampe (1865–1940), missionary and Ojibwe scholar in the United States
- Jernej Lenček (1827–1861), journalist
- Josip Novak (1869–1934), teacher and education specialist
- Franc Peruzzi (1824–1899), archaeologist
- Martin Peruzzi (1835–1900), landowner and discoverer of pile dwellings
- Branko Stanovnik (born 1938), chemist
