= Planinca, Brezovica =

Planinca
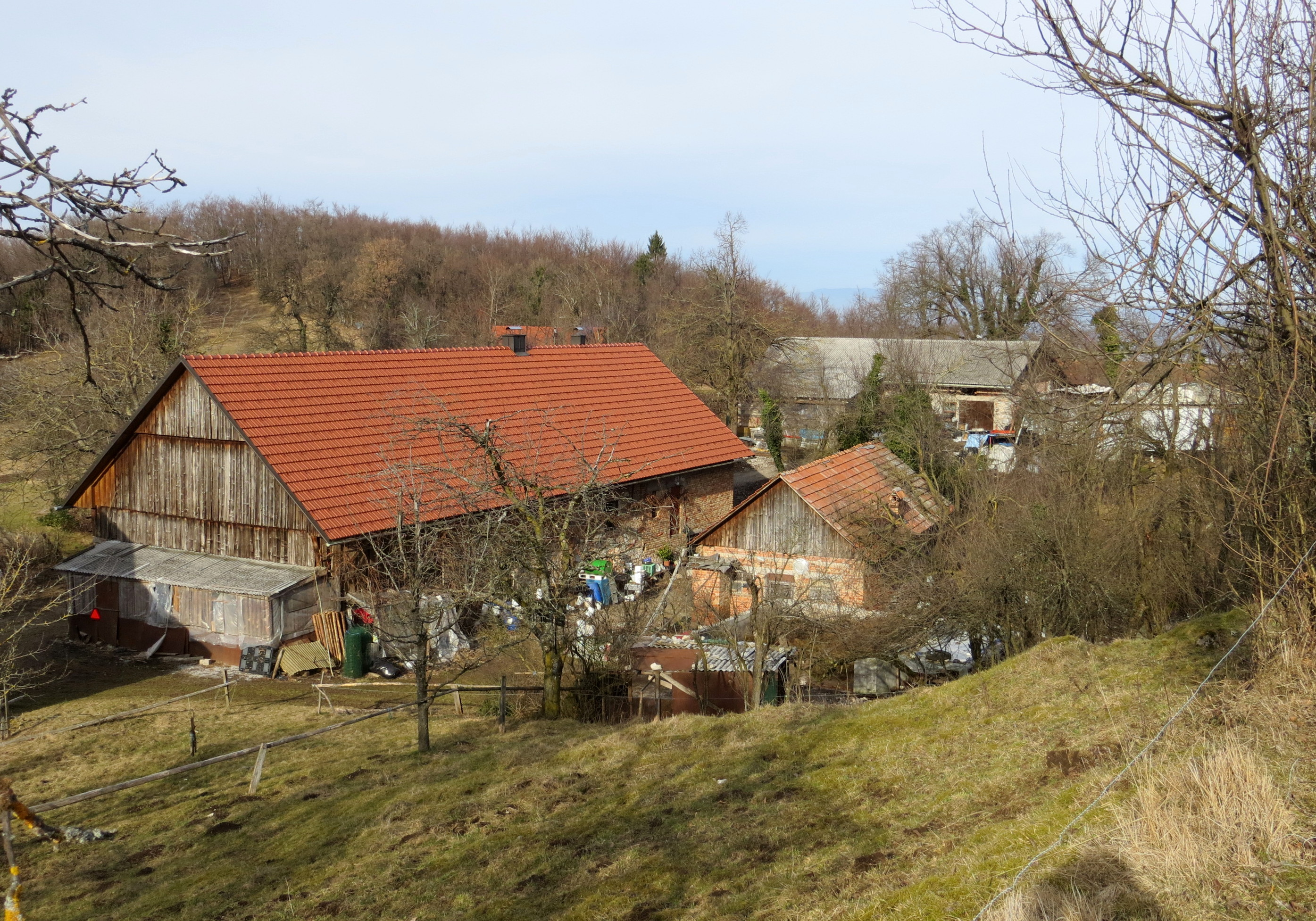

- Location in Slovenia
- Coordinates: 45°57′22.64″N 14°26′49.93″E
- Country: Slovenia
- Traditional region: Inner Carniola
- Statistical region: Central Slovenia
- Municipality: Brezovica

Area
  - Total: 3.5 km^{2} (1.4 sq mi)
- Elevation: 563.3 m (1,848 ft)

Population (2020)
  - Total: 3
- Postal code: 1351

Planinca (pronounced [plaˈniːntsa]; in older sources also Planinica, German: Alben) is a small settlement in the hills south of Jezero in the Municipality of Brezovica in central Slovenia. The municipality is part of the traditional region of Inner Carniola and is now included in the Central Slovenia Statistical Region.

== Geography ==
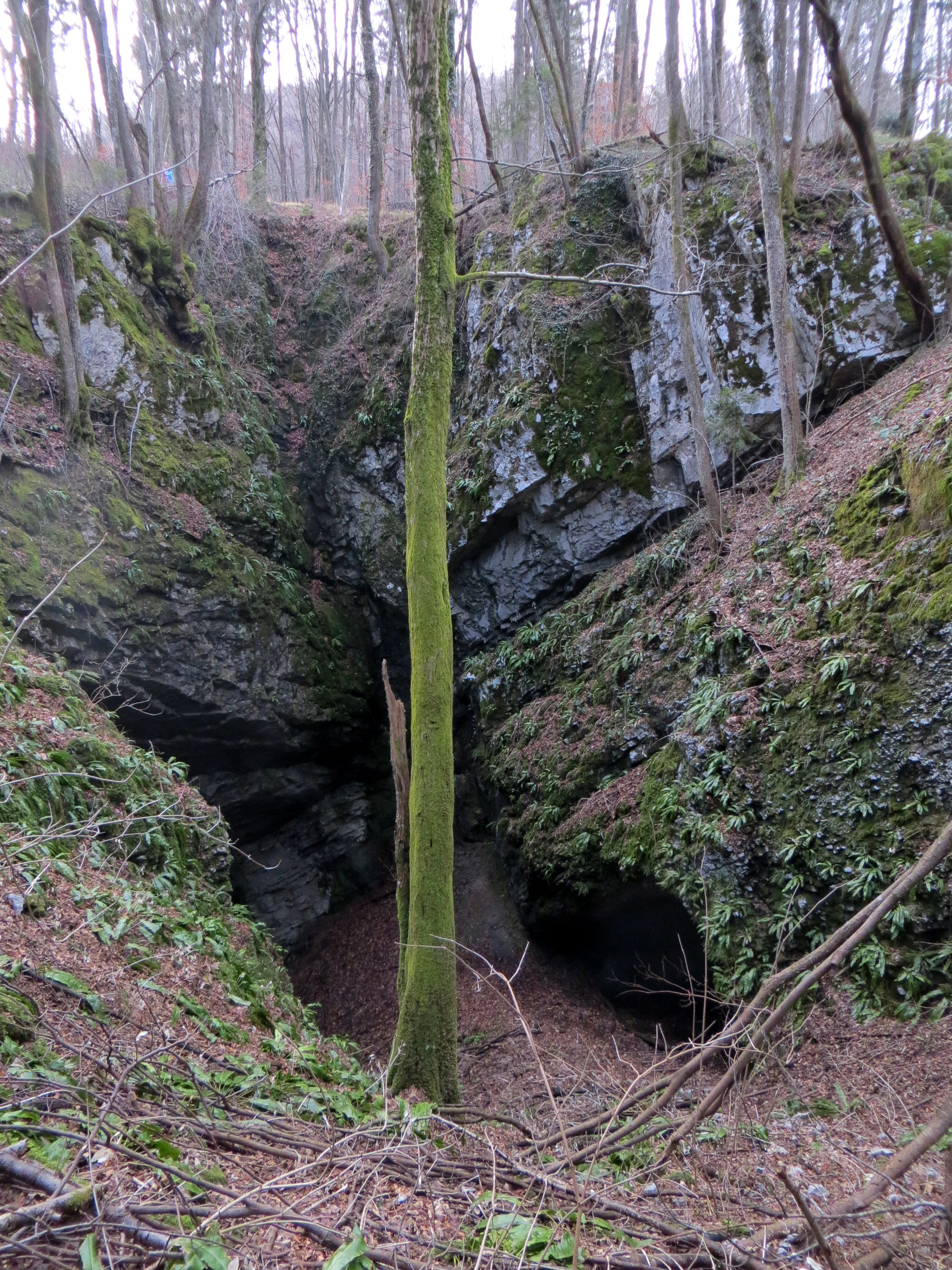
The Ledenica Shaft near Planinca

Planinca lies in a heavily wooded area on the northwest slope of Mount Krim 1,107 meters or 3,632 feet. Lisec Hill (673 meters or 2,208 feet) stands immediately south of the village, and Planinca Hill (Slovene: Planški grič, 579 meters or 1,900 feet) immediately to the north. There are several caves in the vicinity, including Kevdrc Cave (about 50 meters or 160 feet long) southeast of the village and the Ledenica Shaft (about 200 meters or 660 feet long) to the northeast. There is gravel road access to the village from Jezero to the north and from Tomišelj to the east.

== History ==
Before the First World War, the village was considerably larger, with seven houses. The population of Planinca was 31 in the 1880 census, and by 1900 it had grown to 38. However, by the 1931 census the population had fallen to 16 and there were only two houses left in the village. During the Second World War, Planinca was burned by Italian forces on August 25, 1942.

=== Mass grave ===
Planinca is the site of a mass grave associated with the Second World War. The Ledenica near Planinca Mass Grave (Slovene: Grobišče Ledenica pri Planinci) is located in the Ledenica Shaft northeast of the village, in the northern foothills of Mount Krim. The grave contains the remains of undetermined victims.

== Church ==
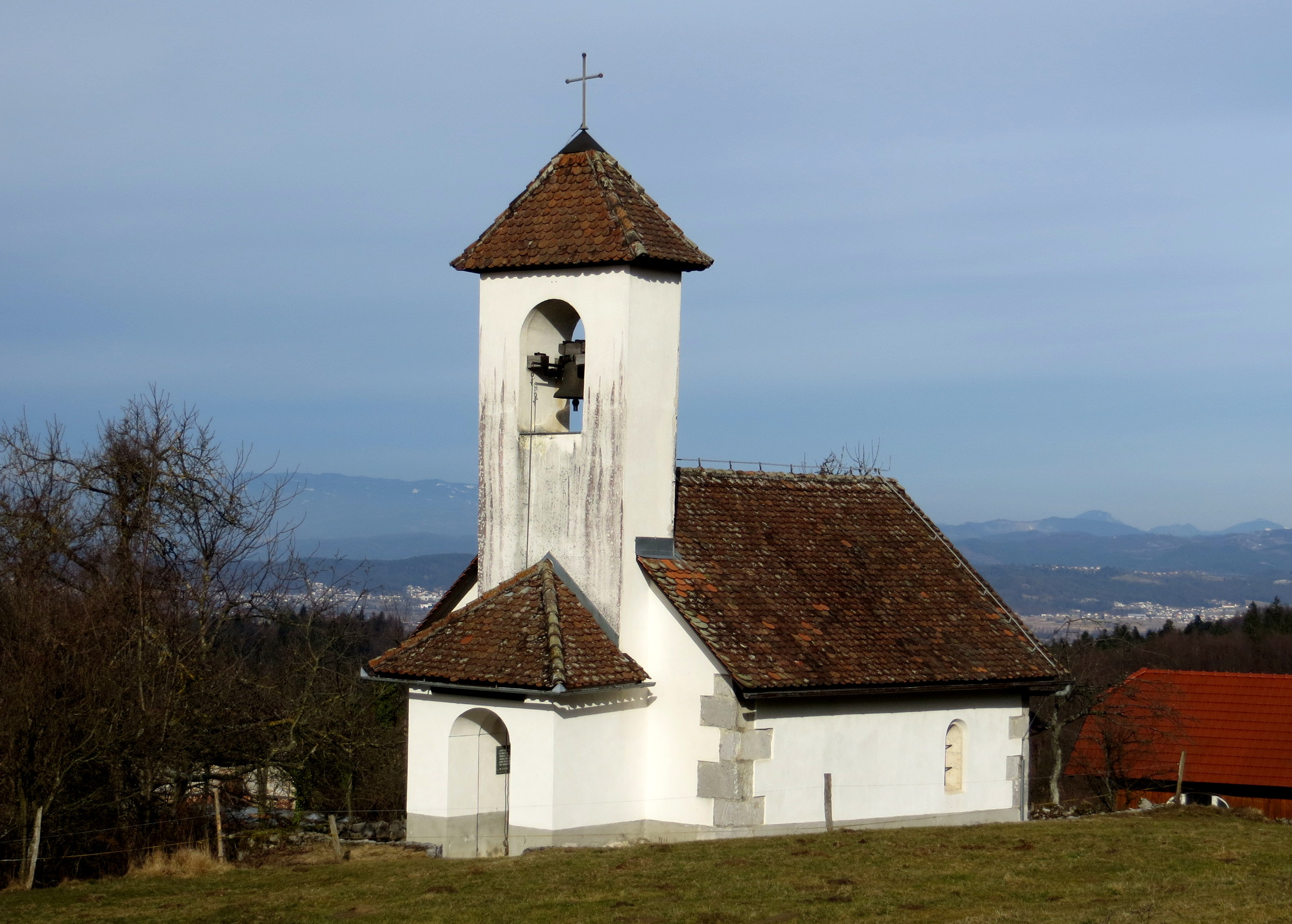
Saint Thomas's Church

The local church is dedicated to Saint Thomas and belongs to the Parish of Preserje. It previously belonged to the Parish of Ig until 1792. The church was first mentioned in written documents dating to 1368. According to tradition, it was built by one of the counts of Auersperg in thanksgiving for having been saved from a bear while hunting. The building had a flat wooden ceiling until 1880, when it was replaced by a vaulted ceiling. The church was burned by Italian forces in 1942 and was not restored until 1989.
