= Vnanje Gorice =

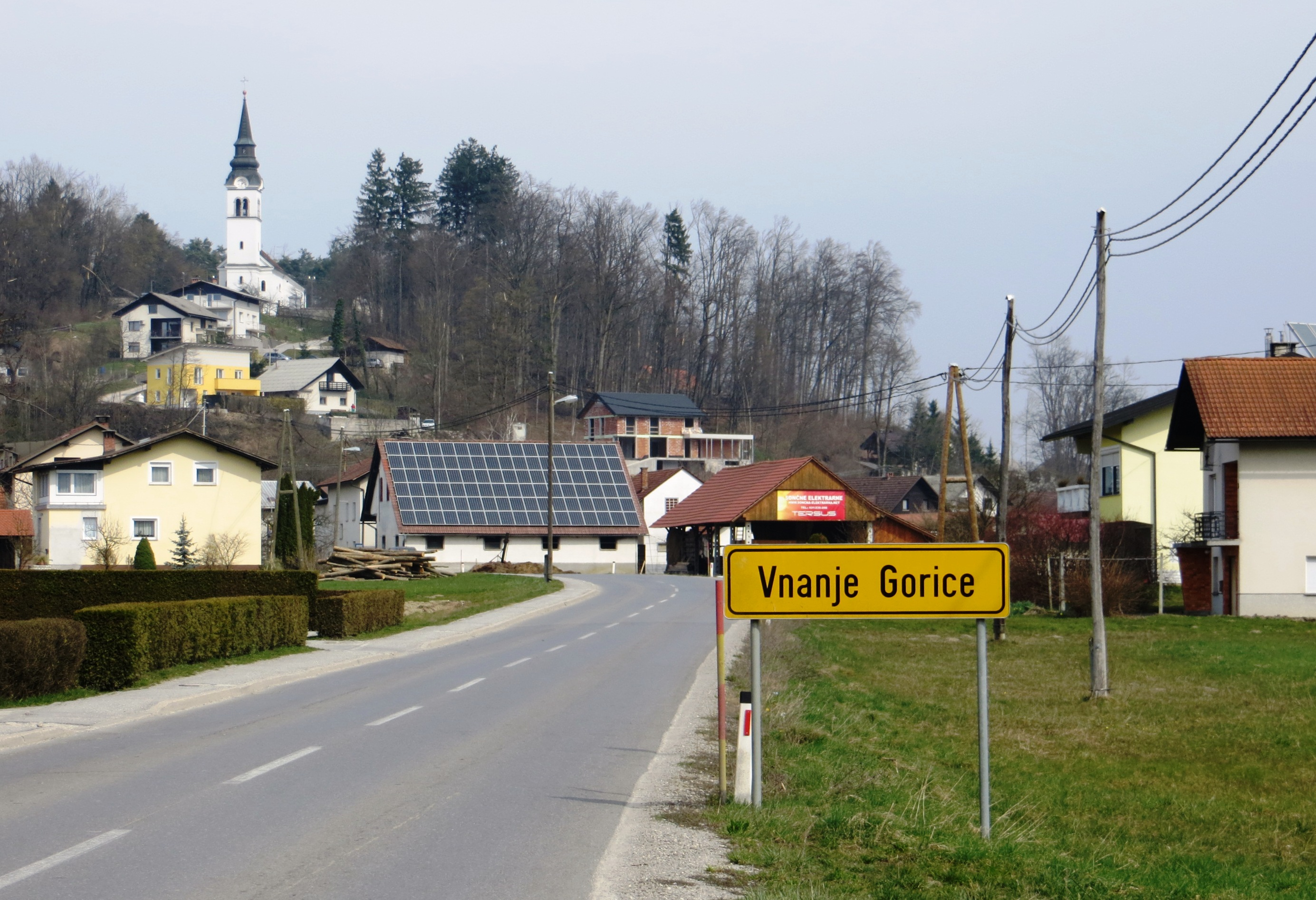

- Location in Slovenia
- Coordinates: 46°0′8.87″N 14°24′52.07″E
- Country: Slovenia
- Traditional region: Inner Carniola
- Statistical region: Central Slovenia
- Municipality: Brezovica

Area
  - Total: 8.98 km^{2} (3.47 sq mi)
- Elevation: 294.7 m (967 ft)

Population (2020)
  - Total: 2,605
  - Density: 290/km^{2} (751/sq mi)
- Postal code: 1351

Vnanje Gorice (pronounced [ˈwnaːnjɛ ɡɔˈɾiːtsɛ]; German: Außergoritz) is a settlement 5 km (3 mi) south of the capital Ljubljana in central Slovenia. It is located in the Ljubljana Marsh landscape park. The entire Municipality of Brezovica is part of the traditional region of Inner Carniola and is included in the Central Slovenia Statistical Region.

== Name ==
The name Vnanje Gorice literally means 'outer hills', referring to a cluster of hills in the Ljubljana Marsh: Plešivica Hill, Big Peak (Slovene: Veliki Vrh), Gulč Hill, and others. The name distinguishes the settlement from neighboring Notranje Gorice (literally, 'inner hills') to the southwest. The name is derived from the Slovene common noun gorica 'hill', a diminutive of gora 'mountain'. The settlement was known as Außergoritz in German in the past.

== Church ==
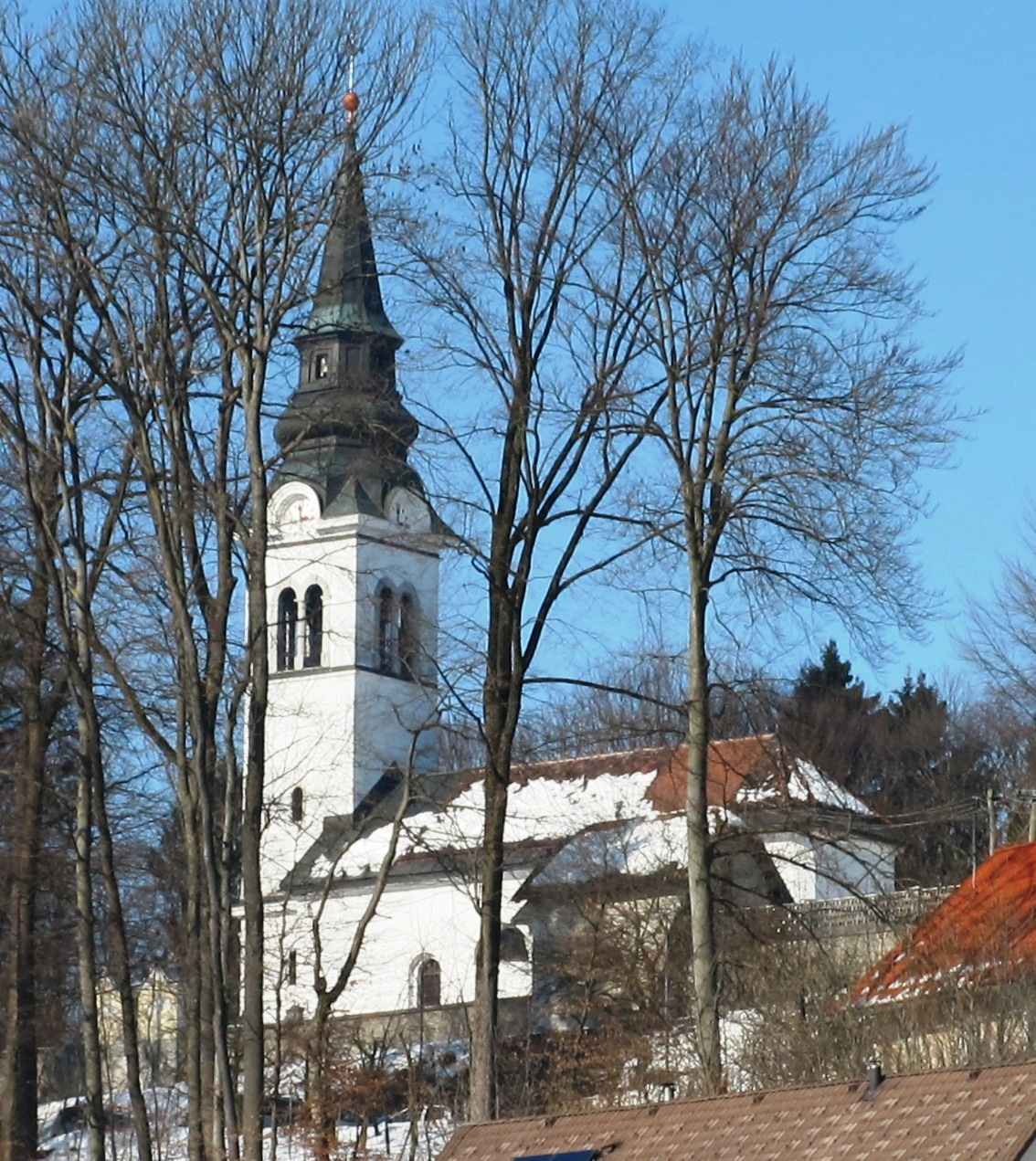
Holy Spirit Church on Gulč Hill

The local church was first mentioned in written documents dating to 1526, but the current building dates to the second half of the 19th century. It is currently dedicated to the Holy Spirit but was previously dedicated to Saint Sebastian. The church was remodeled in the Baroque style in 1742 and it was expanded in 1896. The side altars were created by Ivan Zajc in 1856, and the church was painted by Janez Šubic in 1870. The church is surrounded by a cemetery.

== Notable people ==
Notable people that were born or lived in Vnanje Gorice include:

- Edvard Gregorin (1897–1960), theater actor, director, and playwright
- Valentin Kermavner (1835–1908), classical philologist and translator
- Janek Musek (born 1945), psychologist
- Jože Skubic (a.k.a. Edi) (1896–1944), Partisan soldier
