= Plešivica, Brezovica =

Plešivica
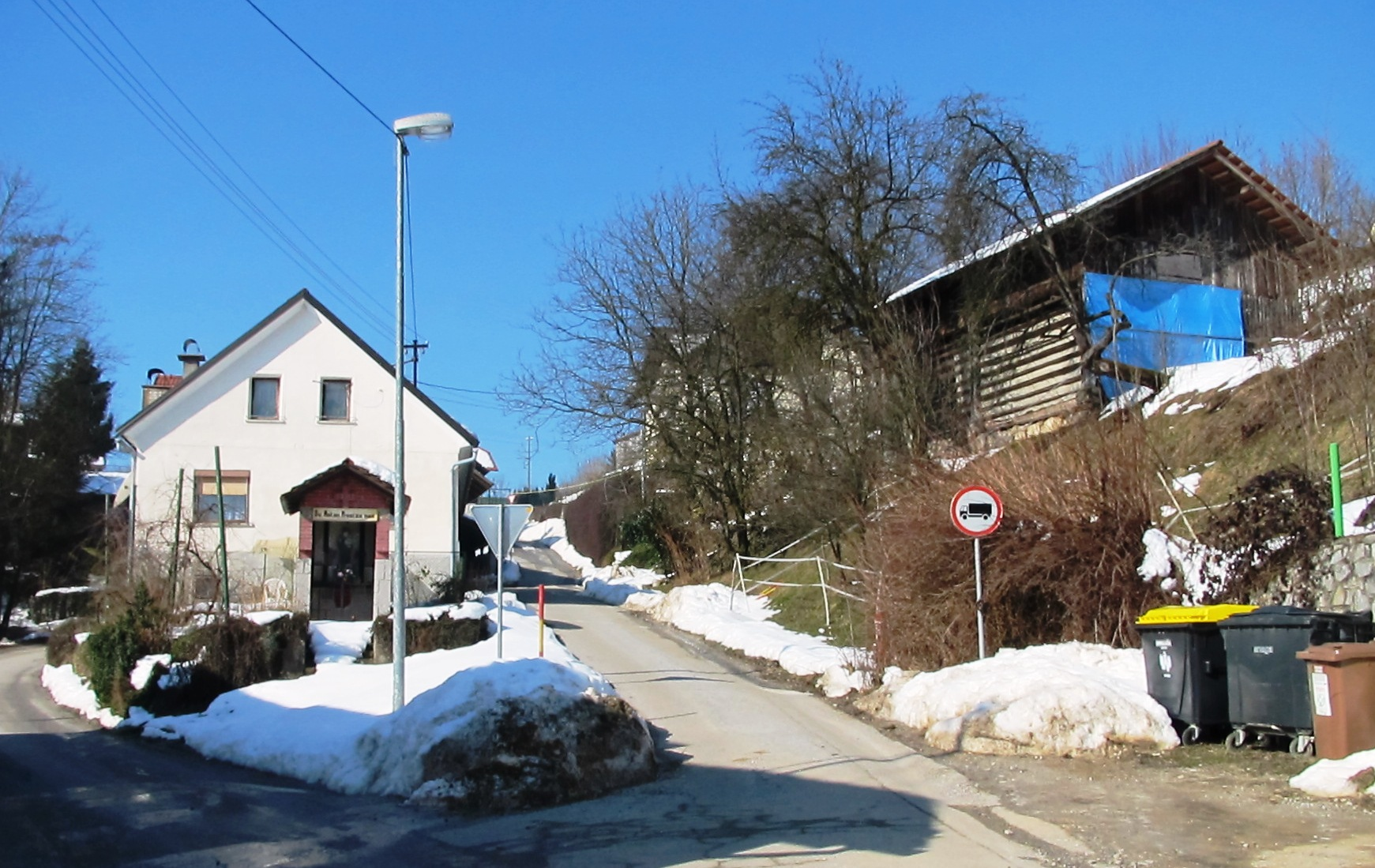

- Location in Slovenia
- Coordinates: 45°59′54.9″N 14°23′41.58″E
- Country: Slovenia
- Traditional region: Inner Carniola
- Statistical region: Central Slovenia
- Municipality: Brezovica

Area
  - Total: 0.76 km^{2} (0.29 sq mi)
- Elevation: 373.8 m (1,226 ft)

Population (2020)
  - Total: 193
  - Density: 250/km^{2} (660/sq mi)
- Postal code: 1357

Plešivica (pronounced [plɛˈʃiːʋitsa]) is a settlement west of Notranje Gorice in the Municipality of Brezovica in central Slovenia. The municipality is part of the traditional region of Inner Carniola and is now included in the Central Slovenia Statistical Region.

== Name ==
Plešivica was first attested in written sources in 1414 as Plesowicz and Plysowicz (and as Plisowicz in 1418 and Plessibicz in 1437). The name is derived from the Slovene adjective plešiv 'bare, without trees' and originally referred to a bare hill without tree cover.

== History ==
Plešivica formerly included the hamlets of Podplešivica and Žabnica. Both of them became independent settlements in 1987.
