= Miki Muster =

Slovenian sculptor, illustrator, animator and cartoonist

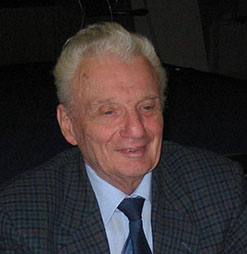
- Miki Muster, 2008
- Born: Nikolaj Muster; 22 November 1925; Murska Sobota, Kingdom of Serbs, Croats, and Slovenes
- Died: 7 May 2018 (aged 92); Notranje Gorice, Slovenia
- Education: Academy of Fine Arts, Ljubljana
- Known for: Painting, drawing, illustrating, sculpture, animation
- Notable work: Zvitorepec (43 editions)
- Awards: Prešeren Award

Nikolaj Muster (22 November 1925 – 7 May 2018), known as Miki Muster, was a Slovenian academic sculptor, illustrator, cartoonist, and animator. He is viewed as a pioneer in the field of comics and animation in Slovenia, known for the series of comics featuring the characters Zvitorepec, Trdonja, and Lakotnik, and animated TV commercials.

== Biography ==
Muster first got interested in animation when he saw Disney's Snow White and the Seven Dwarfs. He graduated from the Academy of Fine Arts, University of Ljubljana, in 1953 with a degree in sculpture. Even during the studies, he wished to join the Disney studios in the US, which was impossible given the post-war political situation. After completing a couple of statues of his wife and a sculpture of the Partisan hero Štefan Kovač, which was his graduation work, he focused on drawing.

In 1952, Muster started drawing his comic strip Zvitorepec, which was running in magazines Poletove podobe in povesti (PPP) and Tedenska tribuna. PPP was supposed to publish Disney's comics but as they did not arrive in time, Muster filled in with his own one. From 1955 to 1973, he was drawing for Slovenski poročevalec, later renamed Delo; after that he worked as a freelancer. His work in comics was frowned upon by the Communist Yugoslav government, with socialist realism being the preferred art style and anything too Western undesirable. This attitude continued to some degree even after the Tito–Stalin Split.

In 1973, Muster moved to Munich to pursue a career in animation at Bavaria Film. After Slovenia declared independence, Muster returned home and was for some time drawing caricatures for political magazines Mag and Reporter.

For his work, Muster received a series of awards. In 2014, the Journalist's Association of Slovenia awarded him the Borut Meško Award for his achievements in illustration and caricature. Also in 2014, he was awarded the silver order of merit for his pioneering work in the field of comics and animation by the President of Slovenia Borut Pahor. In 2015 he received the Prešeren Award for lifetime achievements, the highest Slovenian award for arts. In 2015 he was awarded an honorary doctorate at the University of Nova Gorica.

In his youth, Muster was a competitive swimmer and a swimming coach. In his 60s, he took up swimming again, and in his 70s, he became a world champion in the senior category in endurance swimming.

Muster died on 7 May 2018 in a nursing home in Notranje Gorice, aged 92.

== Work ==
Muster was best known for Zvitorepec, a long-running series of comic books featuring the anthropomorphic-animal trio of Zvitorepec, Trdonja, and Lakotnik ("Twist-tail, Hardy, and Hungerton"): a plucky fox, cautious turtle, and simple-minded wolf. The stories combined an American funny-animal art style with the dramatic conventions of Franco-Belgian bandes dessinées, including lengthy album-length narratives. The series ran for thirty-nine albums between 1952 and 1973, and sent its three heroes on adventures around the world in different historical periods (as they had access to a time machine). A space-travel episode from 1959 caused a minor political incident when the Russian cosmonauts that the trio meets on the trip to the Moon were depicted as bears, causing the Soviet embassy in Belgrade issued an official protest. In order to resolve the problem, the next volume depicted American astronauts as monkeys, which pleased the Russians (while not bothering the US, where the comics were not published anyway). Some stories outlined real-world problems such as increasing pollution and aggressive driving, while a story about Lakotnik building his own house made fun of the construction process in Yugoslavia in the 1960s. Although some contemporaries criticized Muster's style as "too American" and "too Disneyesque", he was nevertheless recognized for his artistic talent. The comics were immensely popular with children and teenagers and remained a mainstay of newspapers and book collections for decades.

Muster's other illustrations and comics include stories about Neewa the Bear, Lupinica, Snežko, The Last of the Mohicans, Ostrostrelec, Stezosledec, and others.

He was also well-known for his work in animation, especially for TV commercials. Among his best-known works were the Cikcak bunnies and commercials for Mercator, Čunga Lunga chewing gum, and Viki krema. While in Munich, Muster collaborated with the Argentinian cartoonist Guillermo Mordillo, creating about 400 shorts based on his characters. He also worked on the animated adventures of German private detective Nick Knatterton.
