= Žabnica, Brezovica =

Žabnica
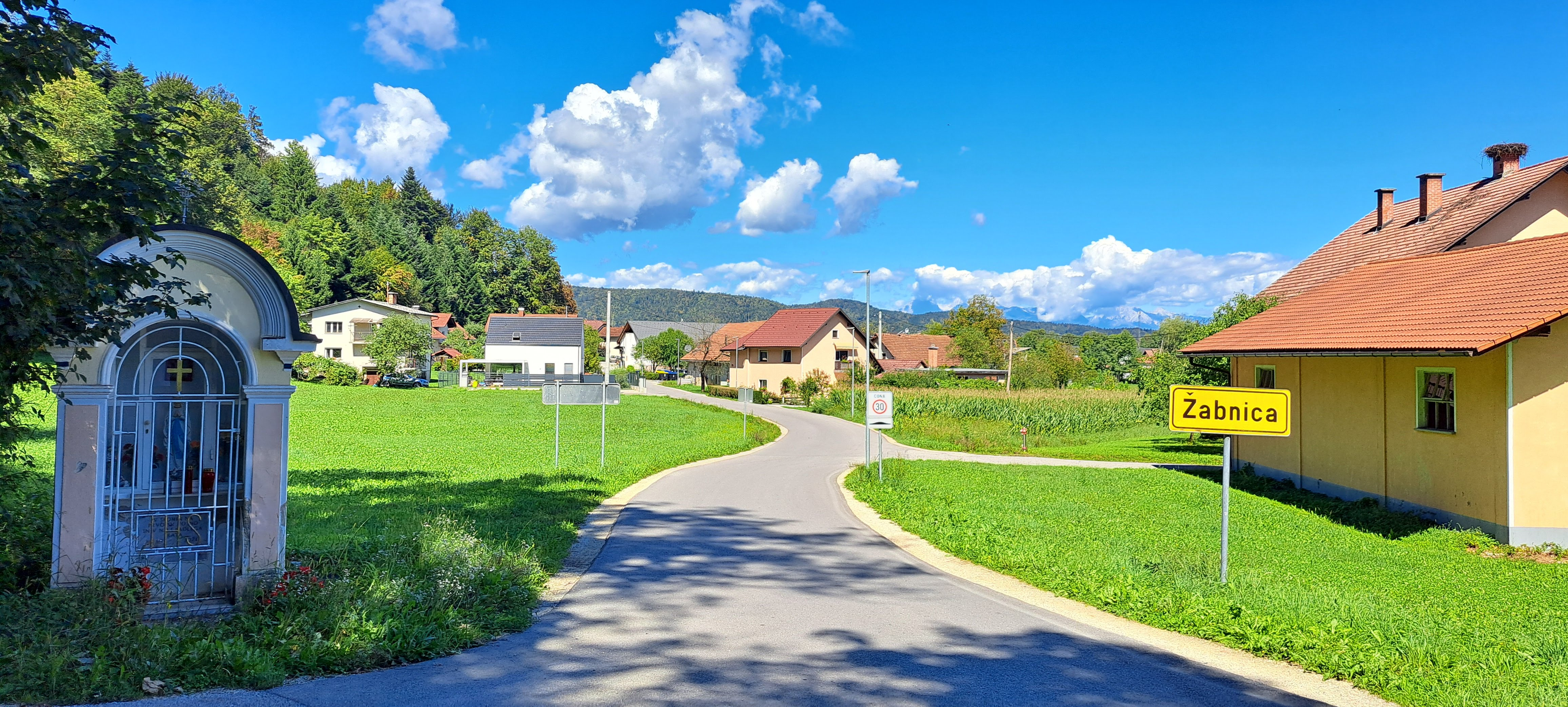

- Location in Slovenia
- Coordinates: 45°59′58.65″N 14°24′16.39″E
- Country: Slovenia
- Traditional region: Inner Carniola
- Statistical region: Central Slovenia
- Municipality: Brezovica

Area
  - Total: 0.82 km^{2} (0.32 sq mi)
- Elevation: 290.9 m (954 ft)

Population (2020)
  - Total: 397
  - Density: 480/km^{2} (1,300/sq mi)
- Postal code: 1357

Žabnica (pronounced [ˈʒaːbnitsa]) is a settlement in the Municipality of Brezovica in central Slovenia. It lies on the edge of the marshlands south of the capital Ljubljana. The municipality is part of the traditional region of Inner Carniola. It is included in the Central Slovenia Statistical Region.

== Name ==
The name Žabnica is derived from the Slovene common noun žaba 'frog'. It primarily denotes a pond with frogs and, secondarily, a settlement next to such a pond.

== History ==
Žabnica was formerly a hamlet of Plešivica. It became an independent settlement in 1987.
