= Prevalje pod Krimom =

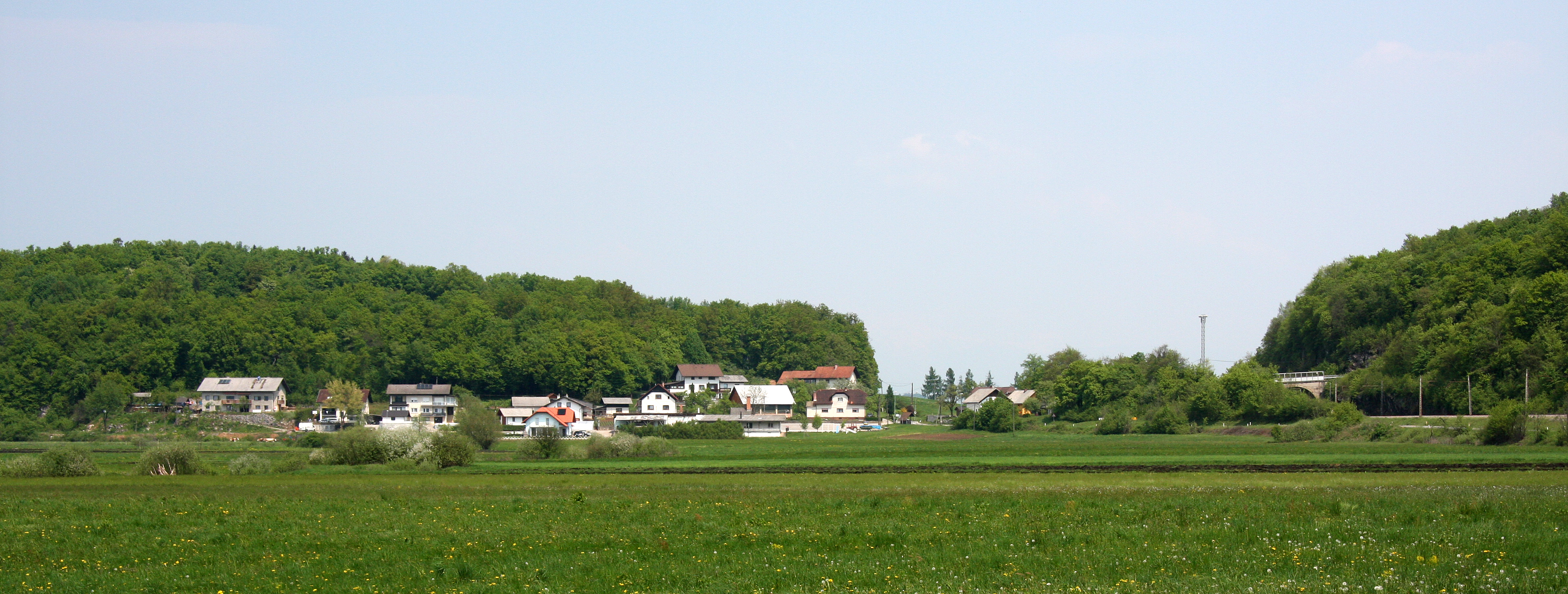

- Location in Slovenia
- Coordinates: 45°57′21.31″N 14°23′30.7″E
- Country: Slovenia
- Traditional region: Inner Carniola
- Statistical region: Central Slovenia
- Municipality: Brezovica

Area
  - Total: 2.55 km^{2} (0.98 sq mi)
- Elevation: 340.9 m (1,118 ft)

Population (2020)
  - Total: 189
  - Density: 74.1/km^{2} (192/sq mi)
- Postal code: 1352

Prevalje pod Krimom (pronounced [ˈpɾeːʋaljɛ pɔt ˈkɾiːmɔm]; German: Prewole) is a settlement in the Municipality of Brezovica in central Slovenia. The municipality is part of the traditional region of Inner Carniola and is now included in the Central Slovenia Statistical Region.

== Name ==
The name of the settlement was changed from Prevalje to Prevalje pod Krimom in 1953.

== Church ==
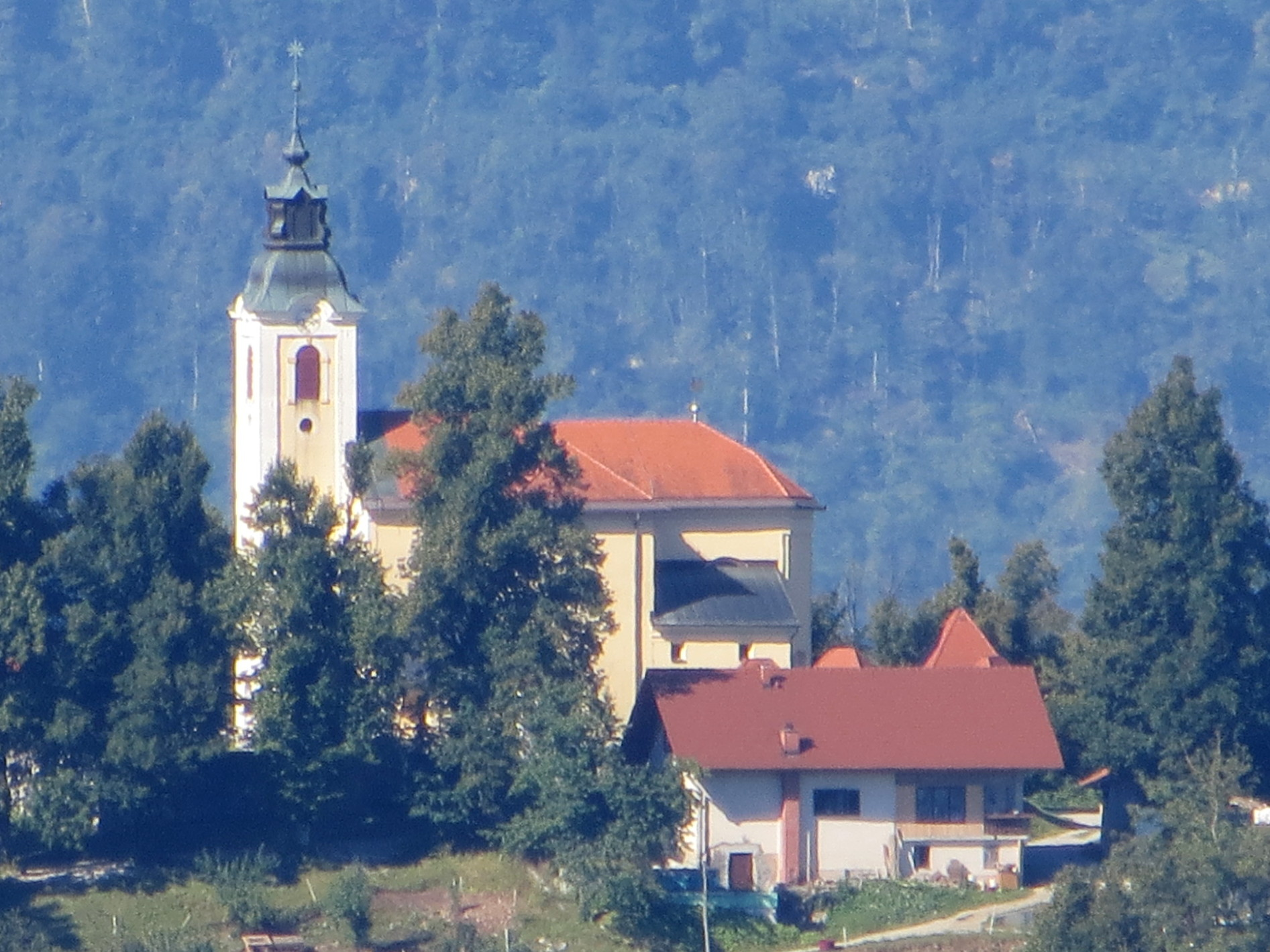
Our Lady of Sorrows Church

The local church, built on a small hill called Žalostna gora' (Mount of Sorrows; German: Trauerberg) north of the settlement, is dedicated to Our Lady of Sorrows and was built in 1727 by the Carthusians from Bistra. It belongs to the Parish of Preserje.
