= Municipality of Brezovica =

Municipality of Slovenia

Municipality of Brezovica Občina Brezovica
- Municipality
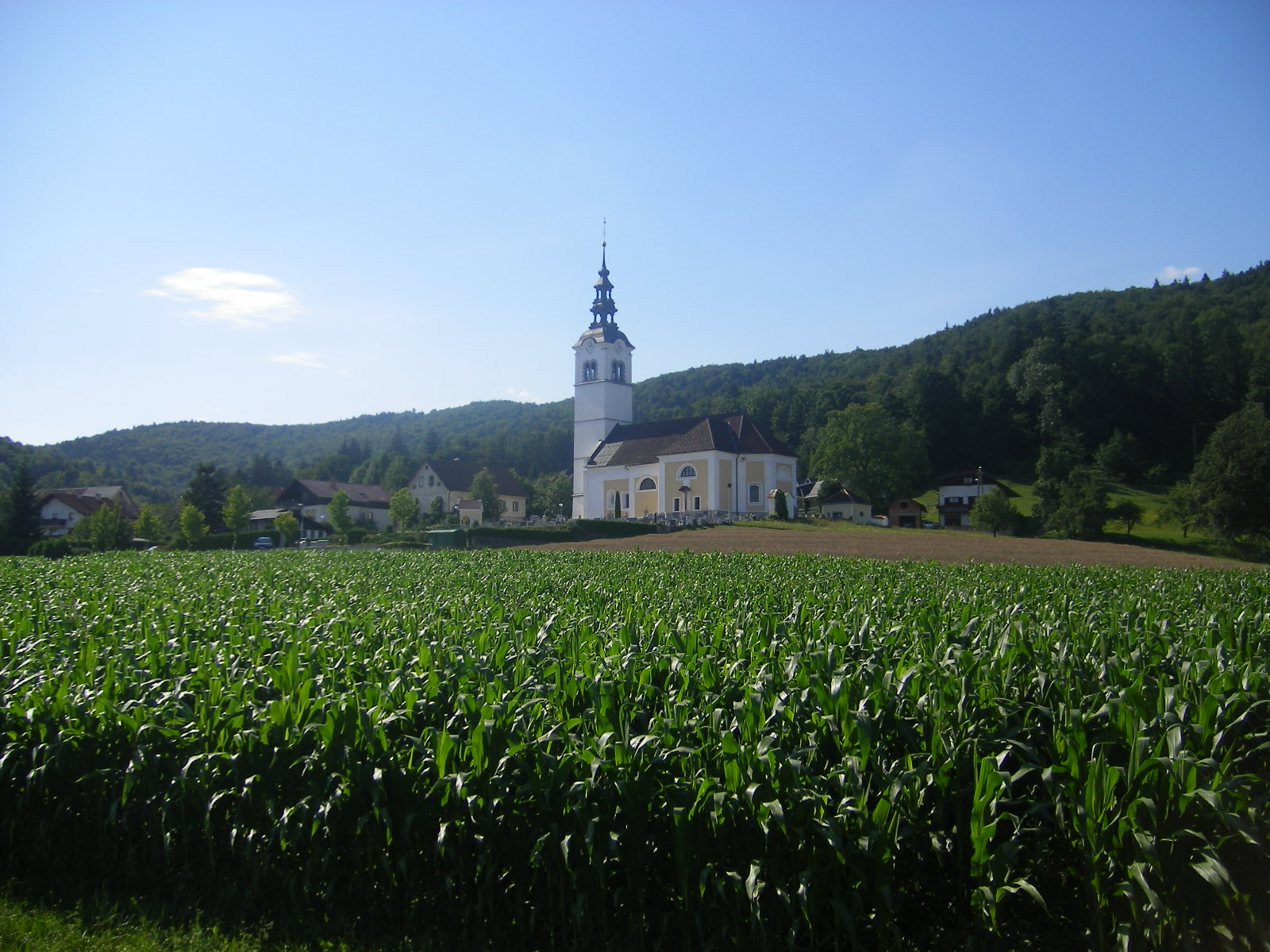

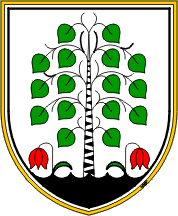
- Coat of arms

- Location of the Municipality of Brezovica in Slovenia
- Coordinates: 46°1′14.37″N 14°25′3.94″E
- Country: Slovenia

Government
  - Mayor: Metod Ropret (GS)

Area
  - Total: 91.2 km^{2} (35.2 sq mi)

Population (2002)
  - Total: 9,334
  - Density: 102/km^{2} (265/sq mi)
- Time zone: UTC+01 (CET)
  - Summer (DST): UTC+02 (CEST)
- Website: www.brezovica.si
- Source: Statistical Office of the Republic of Slovenia, census of 2002.

The Municipality of Brezovica (Slovene: Občina Brezovica) is a municipality in central Slovenia, just south of its capital Ljubljana. It has approximately 9,300 inhabitants. Its administrative centre is the settlement of Brezovica pri Ljubljani. It is the central municipality in the Ljubljana Marsh. The entire municipality is part of the traditional region of Inner Carniola and is now included in the Central Slovenia Statistical Region.

== Geography ==
Geographically it is rather diverse, containing 30 square kilometres (12 sq mi) of the Ljubljana Marsh, with its isolated "sunken" hills, a section of the Ljubljanica River, a siphonic karst lake located just outside Jezero, and the Rakitna Plateau with a lake and 60 square kilometres (23 sq mi) of forest.

To the east, it borders the municipalities of Ljubljana and Ig. To the south, it borders the Municipality of Cerknica, to the west the municipalities of Borovnica and Vrhnika, and to the north the Municipality of Dobrova–Polhov Gradec.

=== Settlements ===
In addition to the municipal seat of Brezovica pri Ljubljani, the municipality also includes the following settlements:

- Dolenja Brezovica
- Gorenja Brezovica
- Goričica pod Krimom
- Jezero
- Kamnik pod Krimom
- Notranje Gorice
- Planinca
- Plešivica
- Podpeč
- Podplešivica
- Preserje
- Prevalje pod Krimom
- Rakitna
- Vnanje Gorice
- Žabnica

== History ==
The area has been inhabited since ancient times. People known as the Lake Dwellers, described by the Slovene writer Janez Jalen in his novel Bobri (Beavers), arrived when the marshland was still covered by a lake. Later, the area covered by the present municipality was crossed by Roman roads, traces of which are still visible, near Rakitna for example. The Ljubljanica River was navigated by boatmen. The Romans redirected it towards Podpeč, a village known for its good quality stone. The nearby forests and the settlements proximity to Ljubljana, have positively influenced the development of agriculture, trade, and enterprise in the area. Many old crafts, such as lime, stone, and wood processing, and wickerwork have survived to the present day.

Stone from Podpeč, known as Podpeč marble, was used in many prominent monuments in Ljubljana by the architect Jože Plečnik, such as the National and University Library of Slovenia. The quarry is now protected and only small excavations are allowed.
