= Mala Goričica =

Mala Goričica Goričica (until 1955)
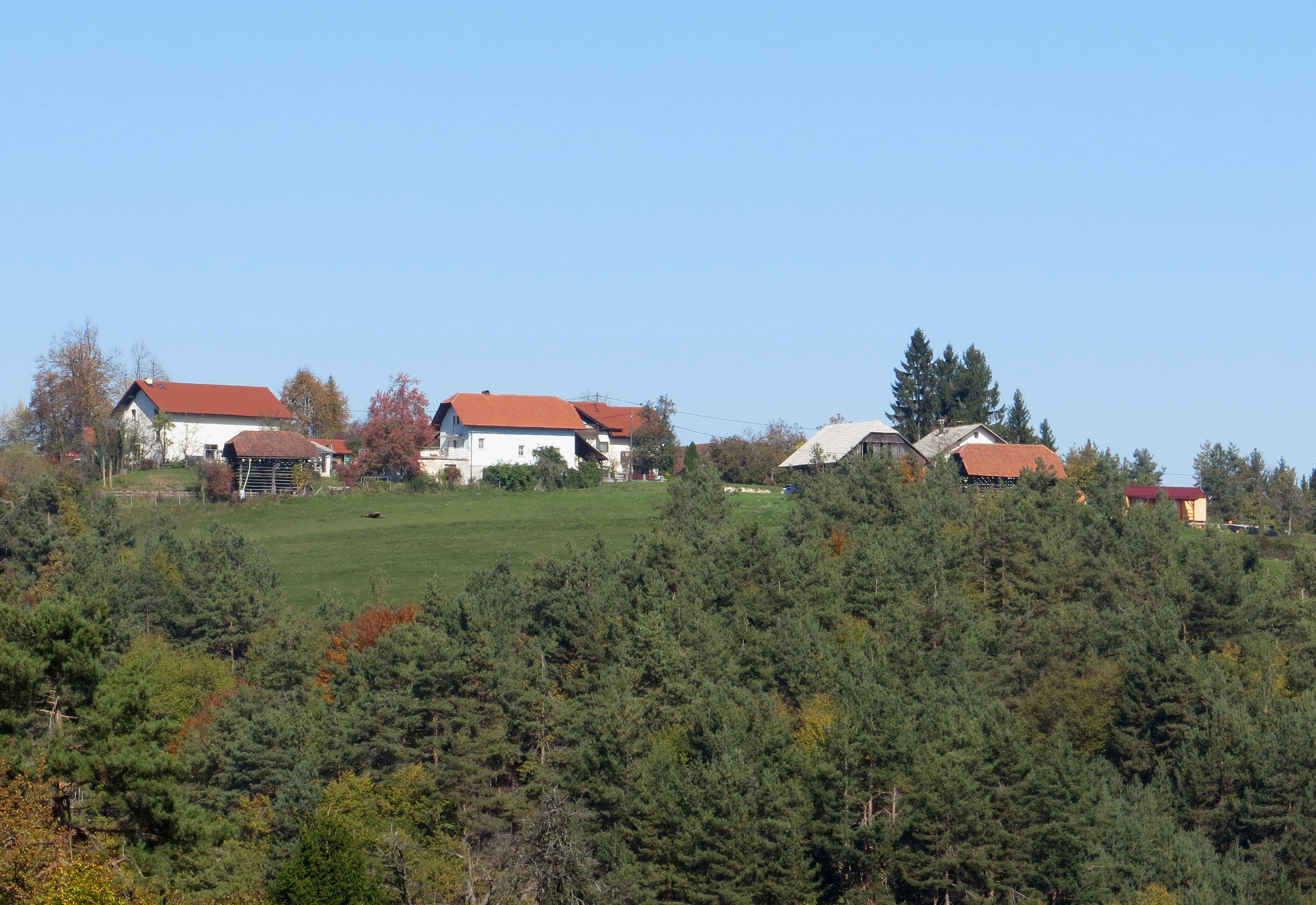

- Location in Slovenia
- Coordinates: 45°59′11.44″N 14°48′9.03″E
- Country: Slovenia
- Traditional region: Lower Carniola
- Statistical region: Central Slovenia
- Municipality: Ivančna Gorica

Area
  - Total: 1.86 km^{2} (0.72 sq mi)
- Elevation: 619.9 m (2,034 ft)

Population (2002)
  - Total: 9

Mala Goričica (pronounced [ˈmaːla ɡɔˈɾiːtʃitsa]) is a small settlement in the hills north of Stična in the Municipality of Ivančna Gorica in central Slovenia. The area is part of the historical region of Lower Carniola and is now included in the Central Slovenia Statistical Region.

== Name ==
The name of the settlement was changed from Goričica to Mala Goričica in 1955.
