= Jezero, Brezovica =

Village in Inner Carniola, Slovenia

Jezero
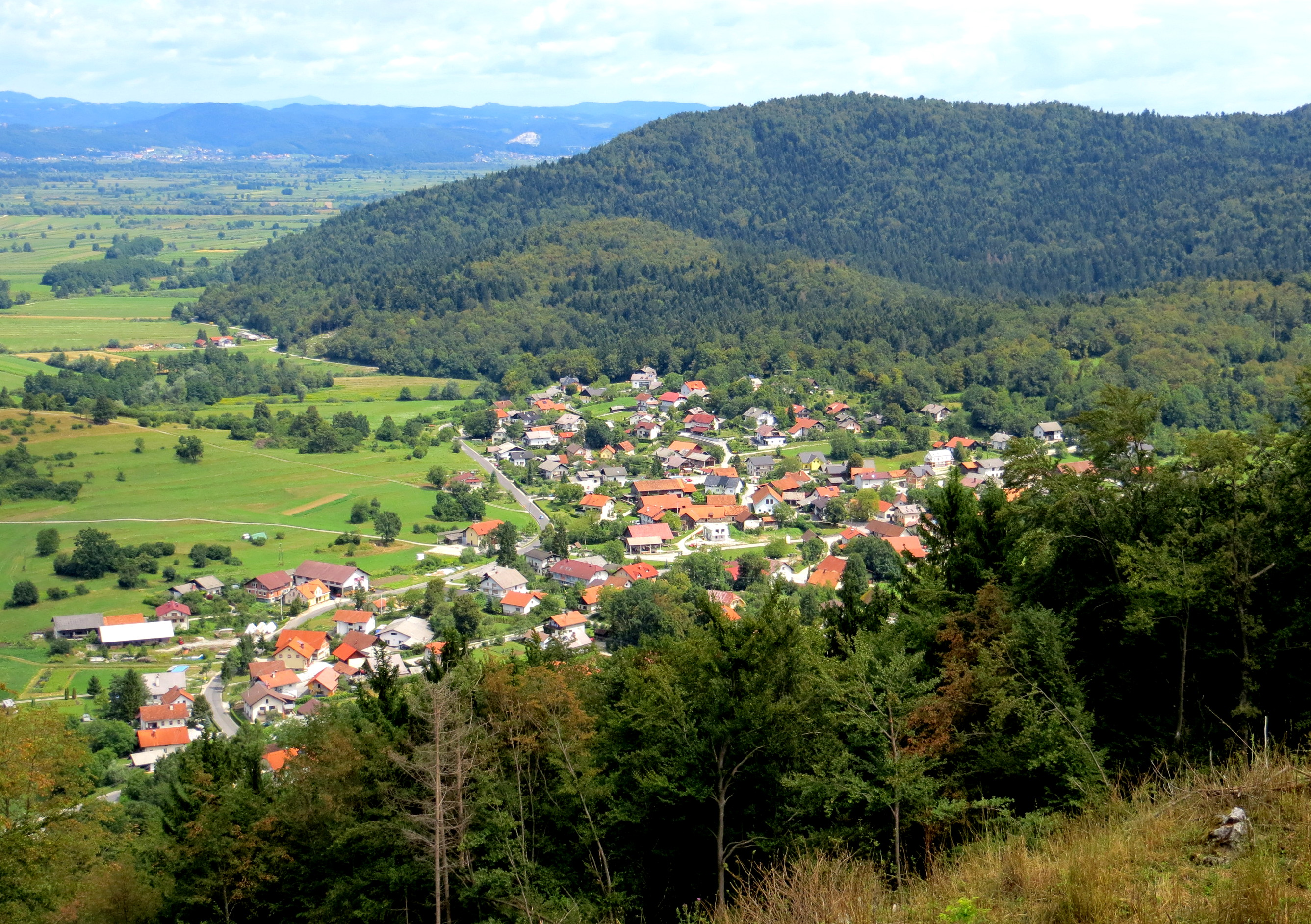

- Location in Slovenia
- Coordinates: 45°58′11.68″N 14°26′9.95″E
- Country: Slovenia
- Traditional region: Inner Carniola
- Statistical region: Central Slovenia
- Municipality: Brezovica

Area
  - Total: 3.43 km^{2} (1.32 sq mi)
- Elevation: 301 m (988 ft)

Population (2020)
  - Total: 821
  - Density: 239/km^{2} (620/sq mi)
- Postal code: 1351

Jezero (pronounced [ˈjeːzɛɾɔ]; German: Seedorf) is a village in the Municipality of Brezovica in central Slovenia. It lies on the edge of the marshlands south of the capital Ljubljana. The municipality is part of the traditional region of Inner Carniola and is now included in the Central Slovenia Statistical Region. It includes the hamlets of Zaledine, Virje, and Zaobloka.

== Geography ==
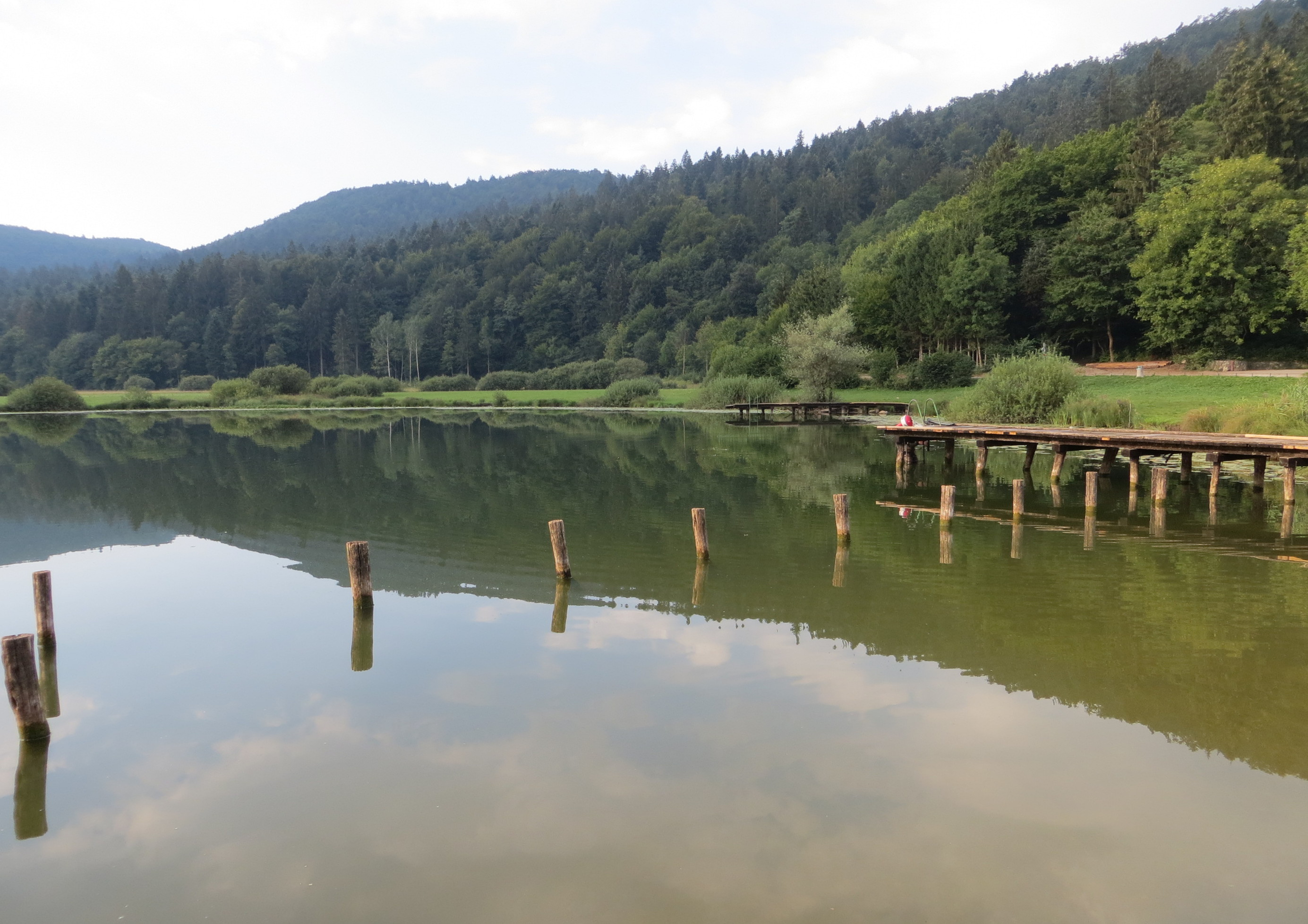
Lake Podpeč

Jezero is a clustered village on a semicircular plain between Saint Anne's Church to the west and Saint Lawrence's Church to the northeast. South of the village in the Zajezero Plain there are low-lying wet meadows and 37-meter (121 ft) deep Lake Podpeč (Slovene: Podpeško jezero or Jezero pri Podpeči). The lake is fed by several springs in the nearby forest and contains trout, carp, and pike. The main tributary of the lake is Mill Creek (Mlinski potok), a constant surface watercourse. The lake drains through a siphon at the bottom, later emerging to the northwest as Hruški Creek (Hruški potok), a tributary of the Ljubljanica River. Swimming is permitted in the lake at one's own risk. Below Saint Lawrence's church are several sets of fields known by the microtoponyms Rušne, Deli, and Cervenke. A water main is connected to Jezero from the hamlet of Podkamnik in the neighboring village of Kamnik pod Krimom. There are several karst caves in the vicinity, including Frog Caves (Krkonove jame), Peršin Shaft (Peršinovo brezno), Little Woods Cave (jama v Malih gozdih), Lipovec Shaft (brezno v Lipovcu), and Big Peak Shaft (brezno pod Velikim vrhom).

== Name ==
The name Jezero means 'lake' in Slovene. Jezero was attested in written sources as See in 1385 and Sëe in 1409.

== Churches ==
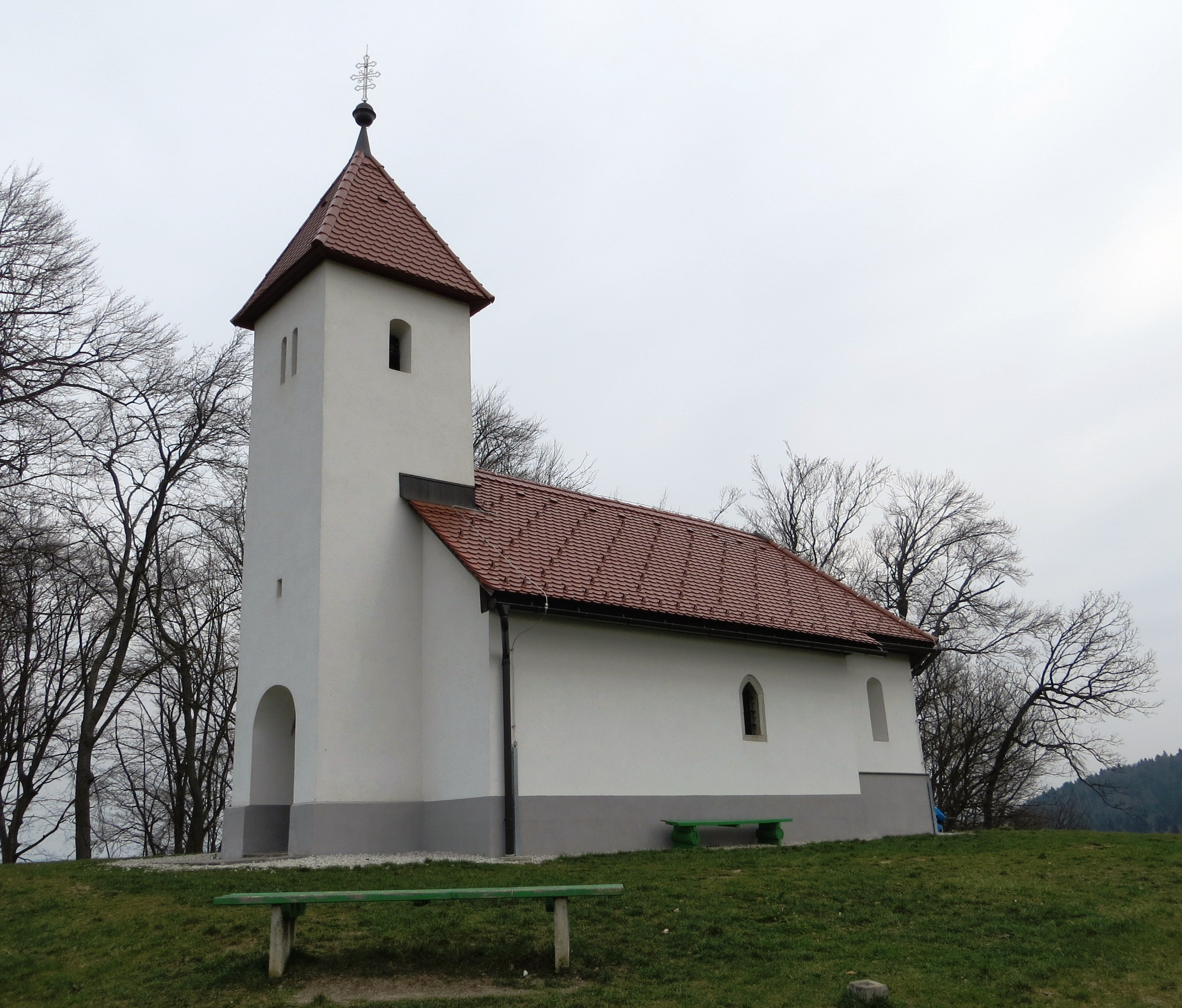
Saint Lawrence's Church

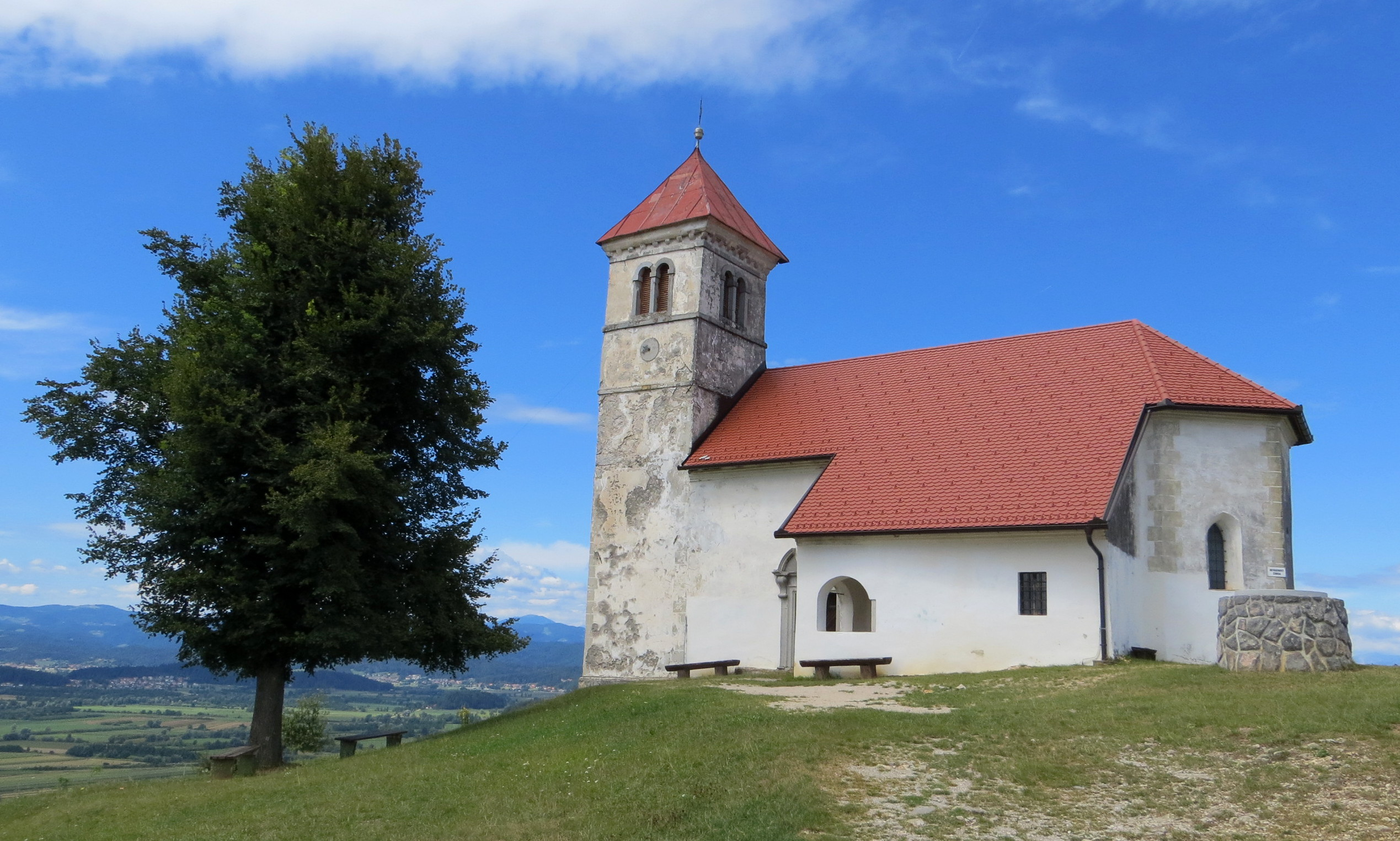
Saint Anne's Church

Churches in Jezero

The local church, built on a small hill north of the settlement, is dedicated to Saint Lawrence and originally dates to the 12th century, but was restyled in the 18th century. A second church, dedicated to Saint Anne, stands on a hill to the west of the settlement. It was also originally a Gothic building, but was rebuilt in the late 16th or early 17th century. Both belong to the Parish of Preserje.

== Gallery ==
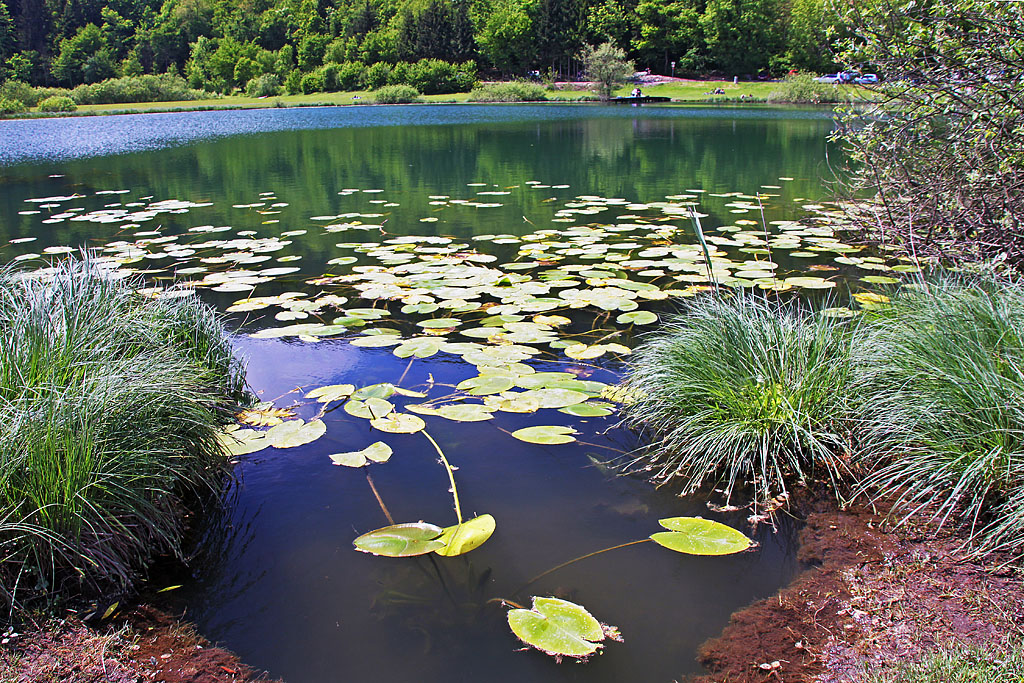
Lake Podpeč
