= Log pri Brezovici =

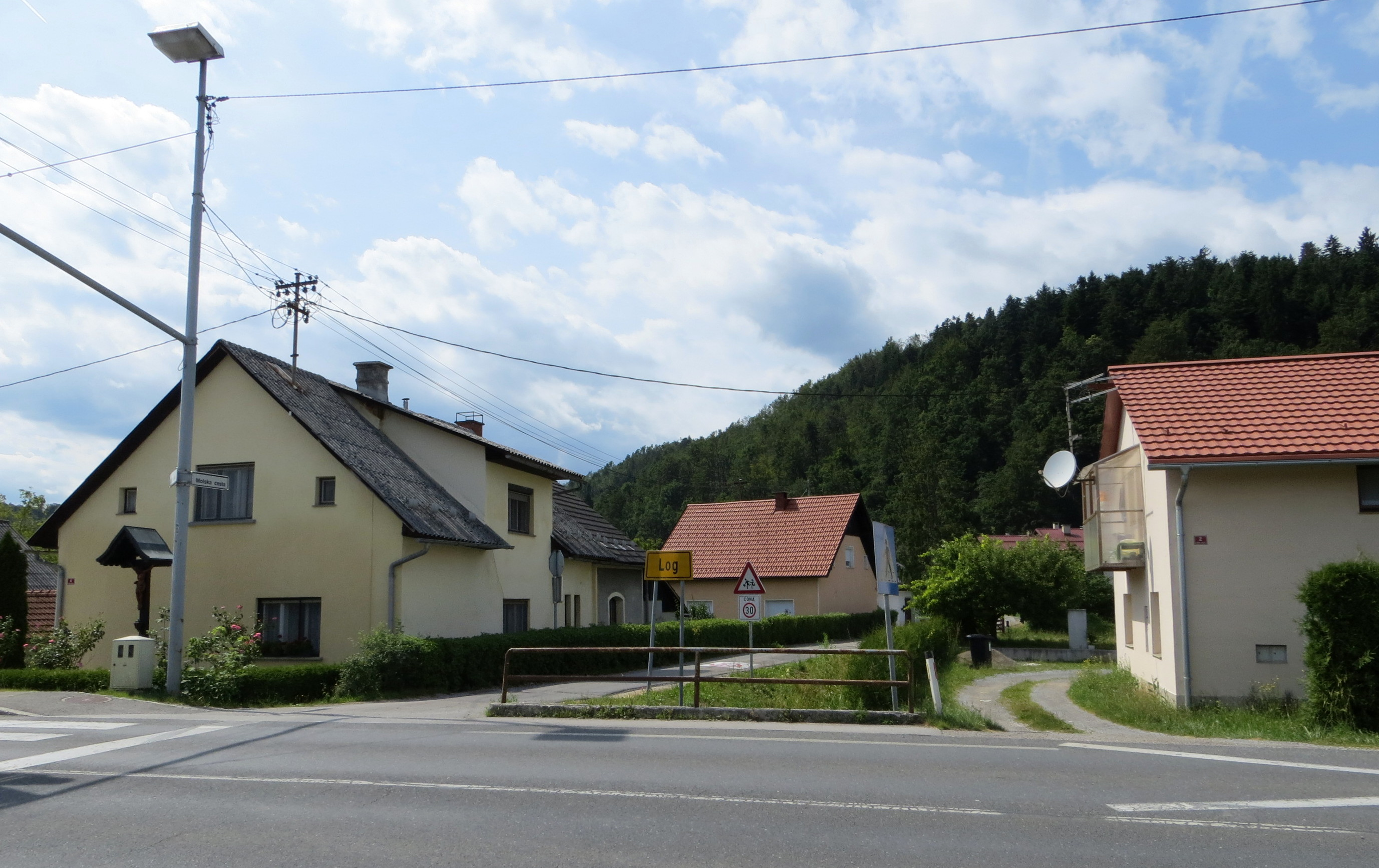

- Flag Coat of arms

- Location in Slovenia
- Coordinates: 46°0′37.3″N 14°21′24.84″E
- Country: Slovenia
- Traditional region: Inner Carniola
- Statistical region: Central Slovenia
- Municipality: Log-Dragomer

Area
  - Total: 4.64 km^{2} (1.79 sq mi)
- Elevation: 338.9 m (1,112 ft)

Population (2002)
  - Total: 1,379

Log pri Brezovici (pronounced [ˈloːk pɾi ˈbɾeːzɔʋitsi]) is a settlement southwest of Ljubljana in central Slovenia. It is the administrative centre of the Municipality of Log-Dragomer in the Inner Carniola region. The territory of the settlement is traversed by the A1 motorway, which used to have a toll plaza there.

== Name ==
The name of the settlement was changed from Log to Log pri Brezovici (literally, 'Log near Brezovica') in 1953. Before this it was often referred to as Log pri Ljubljani (literally, 'Log near Ljubljana'), and this name is often still used today.

== Church ==
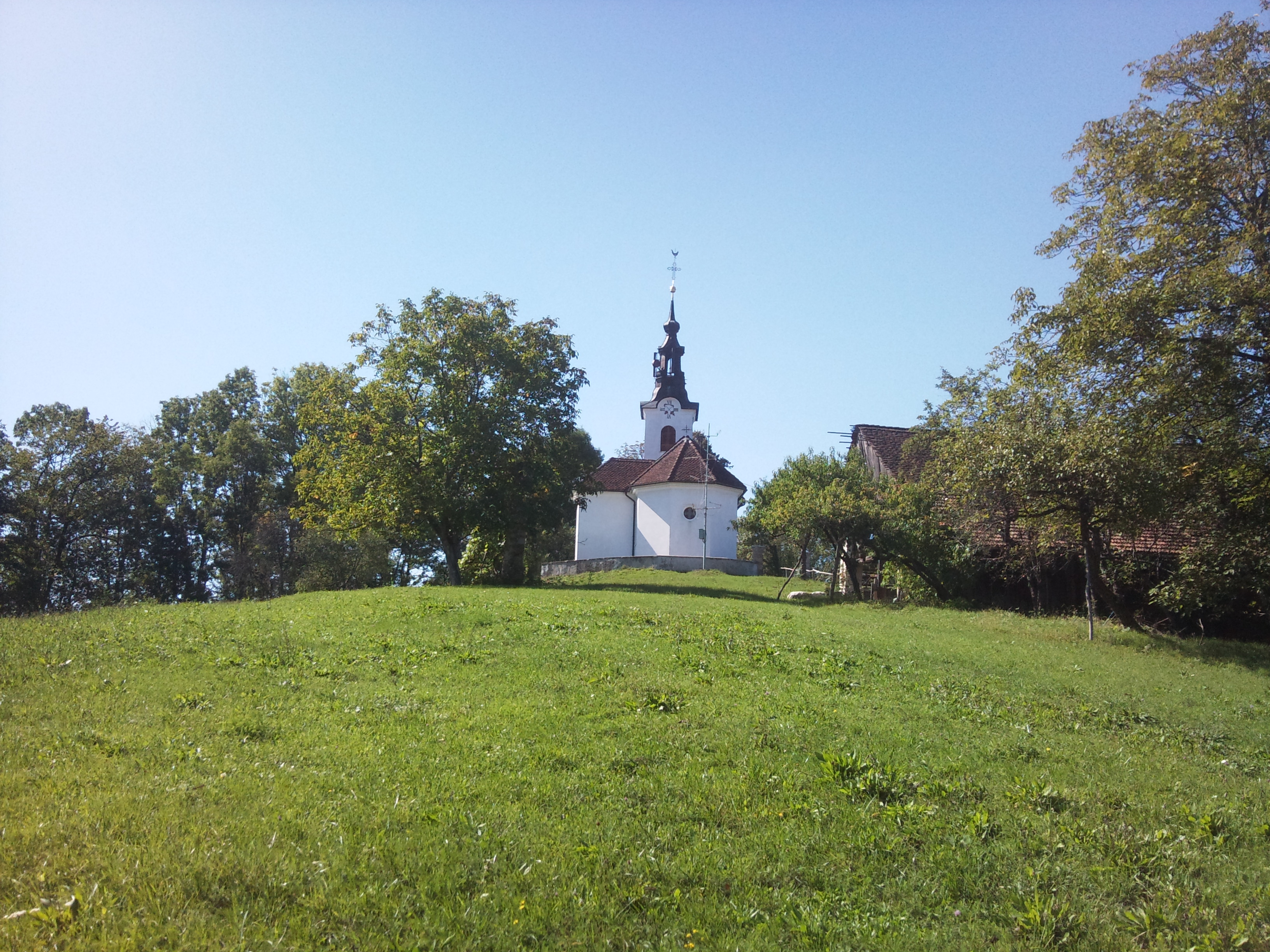
St. John the Baptist Church

The local church in the settlement is dedicated to John the Baptist and belongs to the Parish of Brezovica.

== Cultural heritage ==
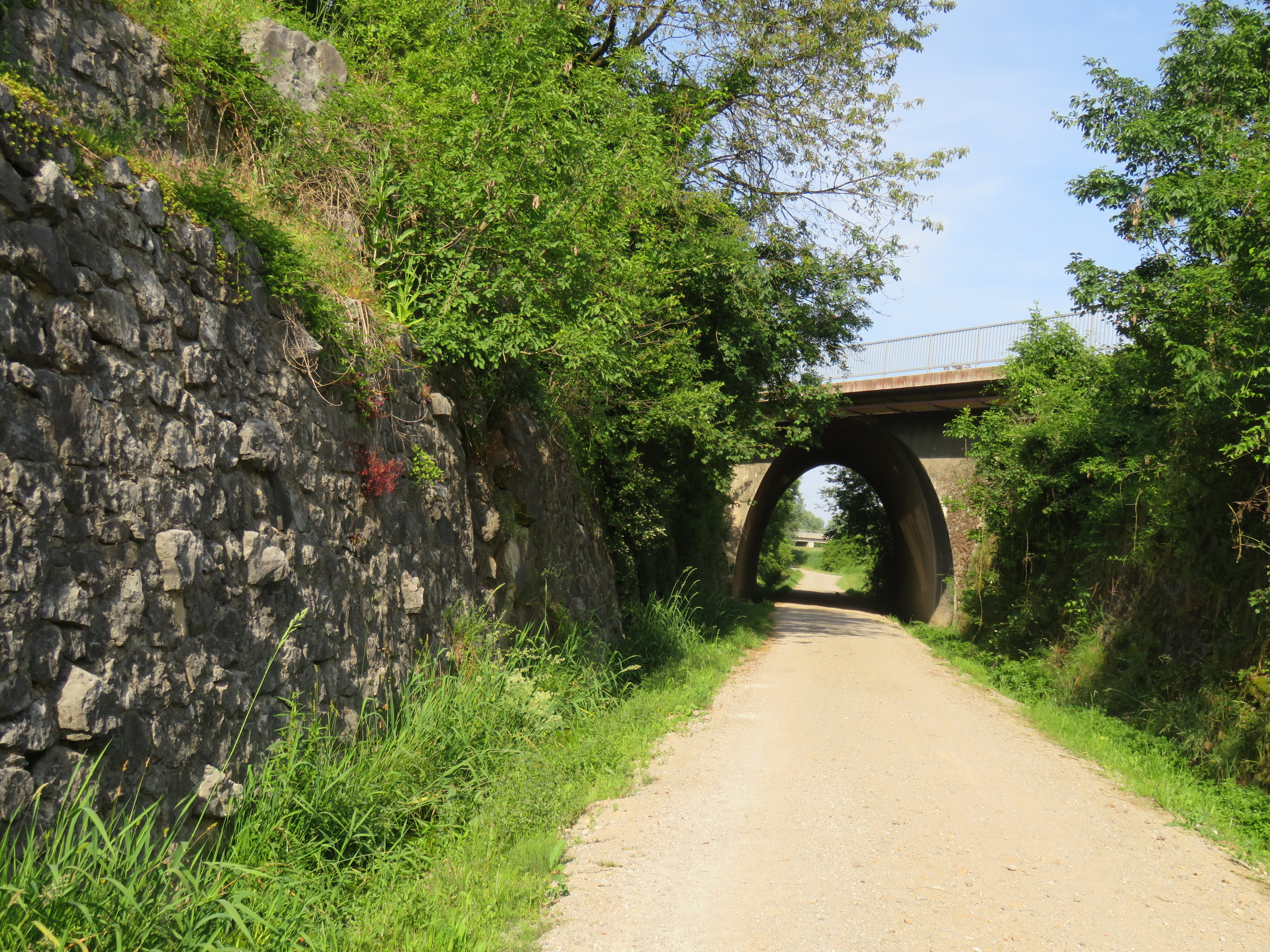
Abandoned rail line from Brezovica pri Ljubljani to Vrhnika

The route of the former rail line from Brezovica pri Ljubljani to Vrhnika passes through Log pri Brezovici. The rail line was completed in 1899 and was abandoned in 1966. A road overpass over the rail line was built in 1952.
