= Notranje Gorice =

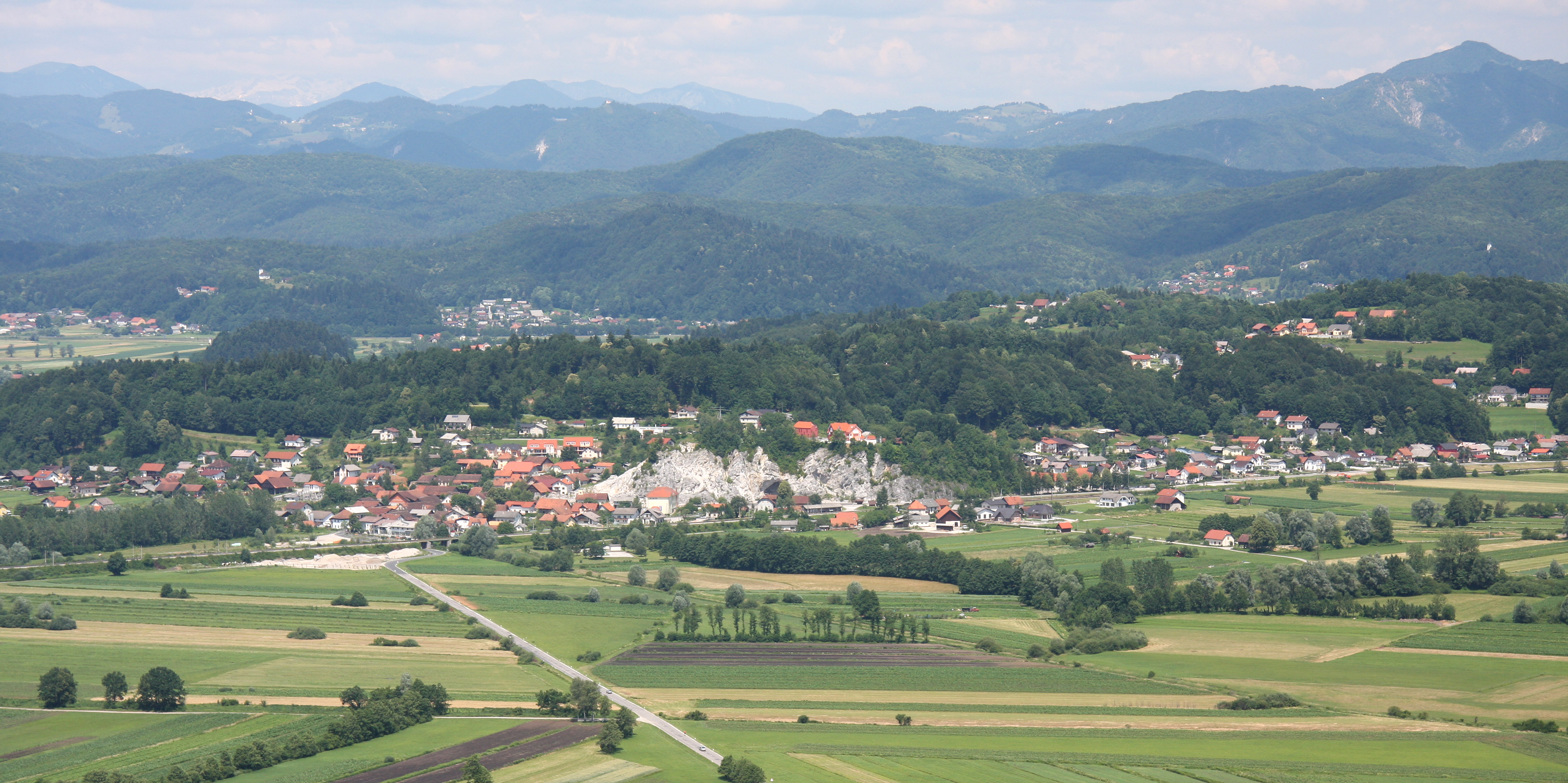

- Location in Slovenia
- Coordinates: 45°59′12.52″N 14°23′51.33″E
- Country: Slovenia
- Traditional region: Inner Carniola
- Statistical region: Central Slovenia
- Municipality: Brezovica

Area
  - Total: 7.66 km^{2} (2.96 sq mi)
- Elevation: 294.6 m (967 ft)

Population (2020)
  - Total: 1,950
  - Density: 255/km^{2} (659/sq mi)
- Postal code: 1357

Notranje Gorice (pronounced [ˈnoːtɾanjɛ ɡɔˈɾiːtsɛ]; German: Innergoritz) is a settlement in the Municipality of Brezovica in central Slovenia. It lies in the marshlands south of the capital Ljubljana. The municipality is part of the traditional region of Inner Carniola and is now included in the Central Slovenia Statistical Region. It includes the hamlets of Pri Ljubljanici (along the road to Log pri Brezovici), Pod Kamnom (on both sides of the railroad tracks near the railroad station), Vrtovi (below the railroad tracks), Gmajna (in the marsh to the northeast), and Žabnica (below Plešivica Hill).

== Name ==
The name Notranje Gorice literally means 'inner hills', referring to a cluster of hills in the Ljubljana Marsh: Plešivica Hill, Big Peak (Slovene: Veliki Vrh), Gulč Hill, and others. The name distinguishes the settlement from neighboring Vnanje Gorice (literally, 'outer hills') to the northeast. The name is derived from the Slovene common noun gorica 'hill', a diminutive of gora 'mountain'. The settlement was known as Innergoritz in German in the past.

== History ==
The remnants of Bronze Age stilt houses were discovered behind the Oblak house in Notranje Gorice in 1907 and 1908, testifying to early settlement of the area. Additional prehistoric finds include a boat discovered at the Mrak farm in 1932 and additional stilt houses in 1953 while regulating the Kušlan Canal. The former bed of the Ljubljanica River, which was rerouted to Podpeč by the Romans, runs through the southern part of the settlement. The settlement was attested in written sources in 1197 and 1202 as a property of St. Paul's Abbey in Carinthia. Schooling was established in 1902, and a schoolhouse was built in 1905 (and renovated in 1928). During the Second World War, Italian forces burned several houses in the settlement. A monument along the road to Podpeč marks the site where 11 hostages were shot during the war.

== Church ==
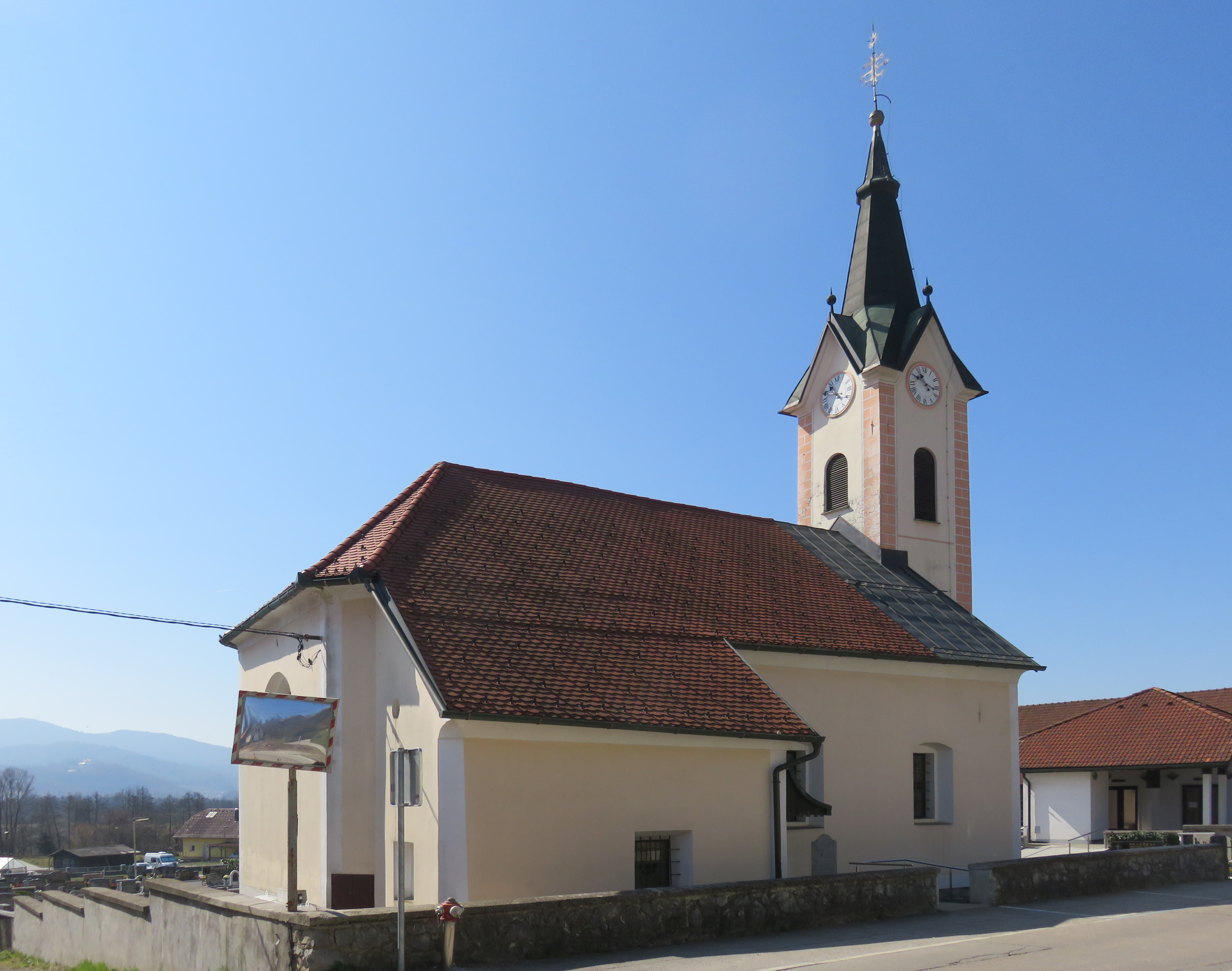
Saint Martin's Church

The local parish church is dedicated to Saint Martin and belongs to the Roman Catholic Archdiocese of Ljubljana. It was first mentioned in 1453, but the current building was extensively rebuilt in 1861. The main altar was created by Celestin Mis using Baroque statuary. The church's statues of Saint Martin and the Virgin Mary date from the late 15th century.

== Notable people ==
Notable people that were born or lived in Notranje Gorice include:

- Janže Novak (1893–1934), politician
