= Ljubljana Marsh =

Wetlands in central Slovenia

Coordinates: 45°59′14.71″N 14°27′14″E

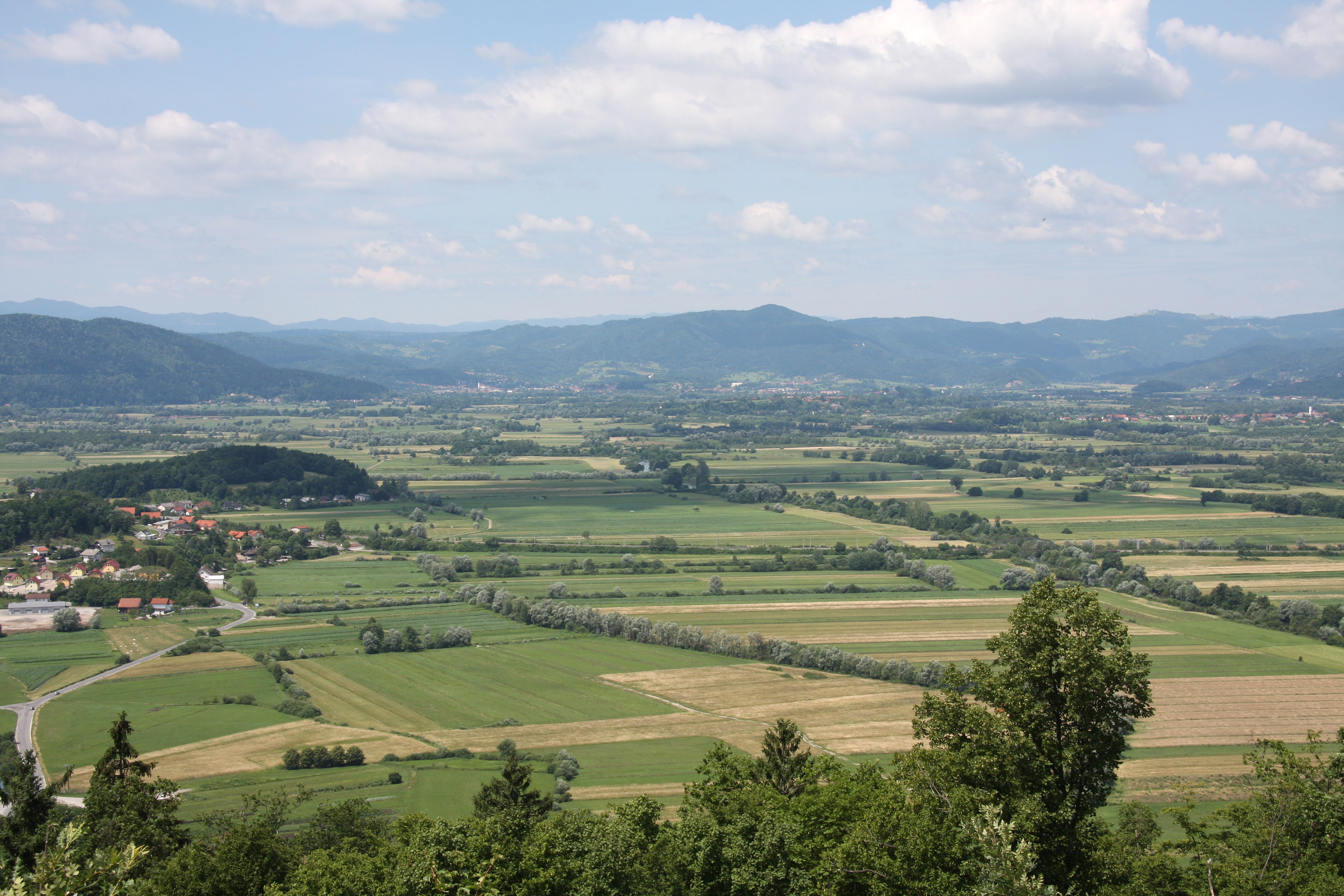
The western rim of the Ljubljana Marsh, viewed from St. Anne Hill above Podpeč

The Ljubljana Marsh (Slovene: Ljubljansko barje), located south of Ljubljana, the capital of Slovenia, is the largest marsh in the country. It covers 163 square kilometres (63 sq mi) or 0.8% of the Slovene territory. It is administered by the municipalities of Borovnica, Brezovica, Ljubljana, Ig, Log-Dragomer, Škofljica and Vrhnika.

== Biodiversity ==
The Ljubljana Marsh is a place of great biodiversity. From 2008, a major part of the Ljubljana Marsh, covering an area of 135 km^{2} (52 sq mi), has been protected as a landscape park. The most preserved parts had already been protected as a nature reserve and as a natural monument.

== History ==
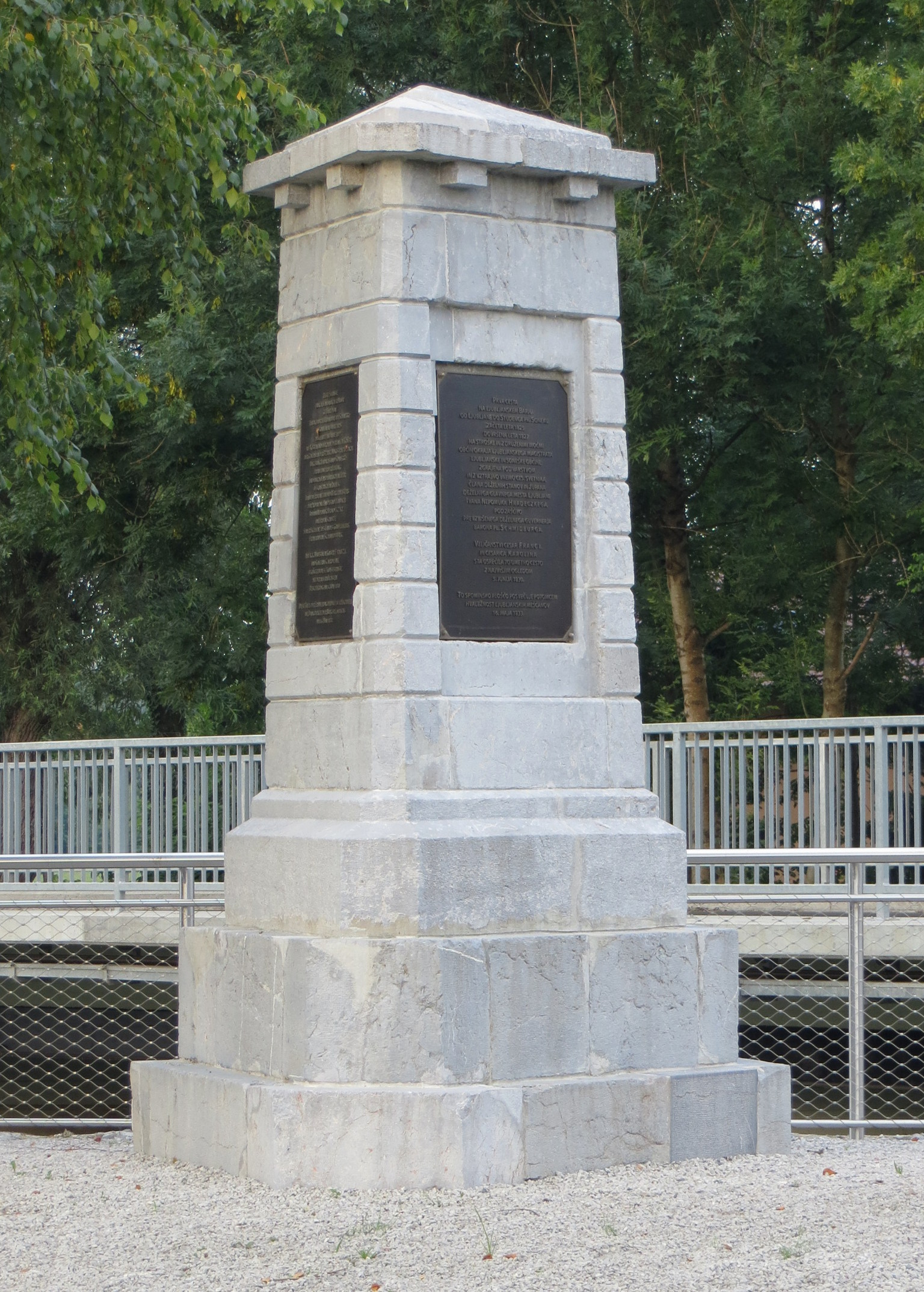
Monument on the Iščica River

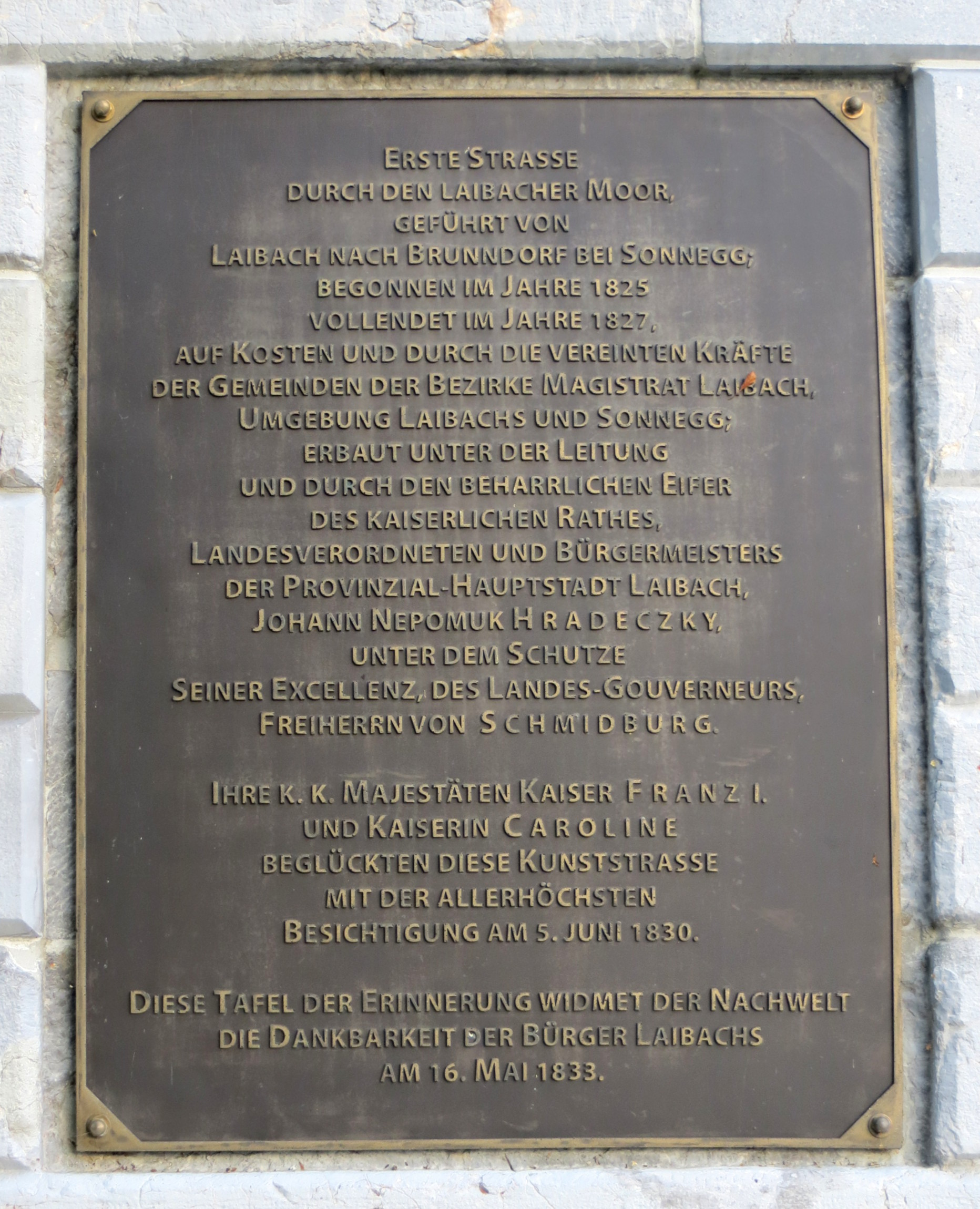
German-language plaque

Monument to the first road through the marsh

The Ljubljana Marsh was inhabited in prehistoric times, when it was a shallow lake. Prehistoric pile dwellings and the oldest wooden wheel in the world are among the most notable archaeological findings from the marshland. Excavations in the area were led by Tatjana Bregant from 1969. Since 2011, the area of pile dwellings near Ig has been protected as a UNESCO World Heritage Site.

The first road through the marsh, connecting Ljubljana to Studenec (now Ig), was begun in 1825 and completed in 1827. The work was carried out under Mayor Johann Nepomuk Hradeczky (1775–1846) and the provincial governor, Baron Joseph Camillo von Schmidburg (1779–1846). Emperor Francis I of Austria and Empress Caroline Augusta of Bavaria inspected the road in 1830, and a monument was erected to the achievement in 1833.

== Hamlets ==
The marshland includes a number of hamlets that belong to the city of Ljubljana: Ilovica, Volar, Pri Strahu, Pri Maranzu, Kožuh, and Havptmance (from north to south). Ilovica was settled relatively late, starting in 1838, and had only six farms by 1860. Volar lies between the Iščica and Ljubljanica rivers and was settled after 1830, when it was also officially designated Karolinska zemlja (German: Karolinengrund), literally 'Caroline's land', in honor of Caroline Augusta of Bavaria. Kožuh lies further south, and Havptmance east of Kožuh. Havptmance (also spelled Haupt- and -man(i)ca or -manice) was already mentioned as a place in the 18th century and was settled in the 1870s, when peat extraction was a major economic activity. The name Havptmance probably refers to the fact that the provincial governor (German: Landeshauptmann) had his hunting grounds in the area.

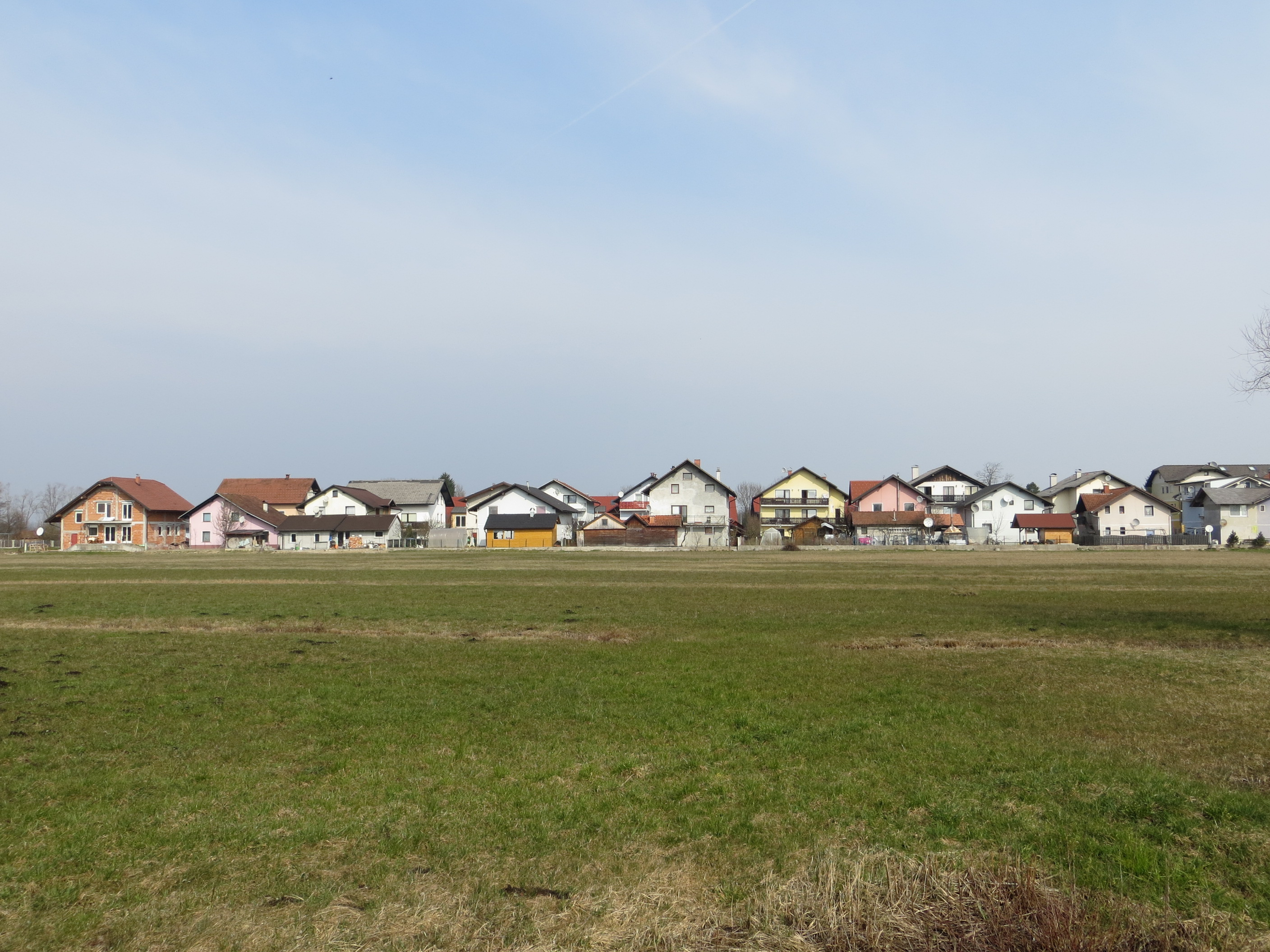
Kožuh

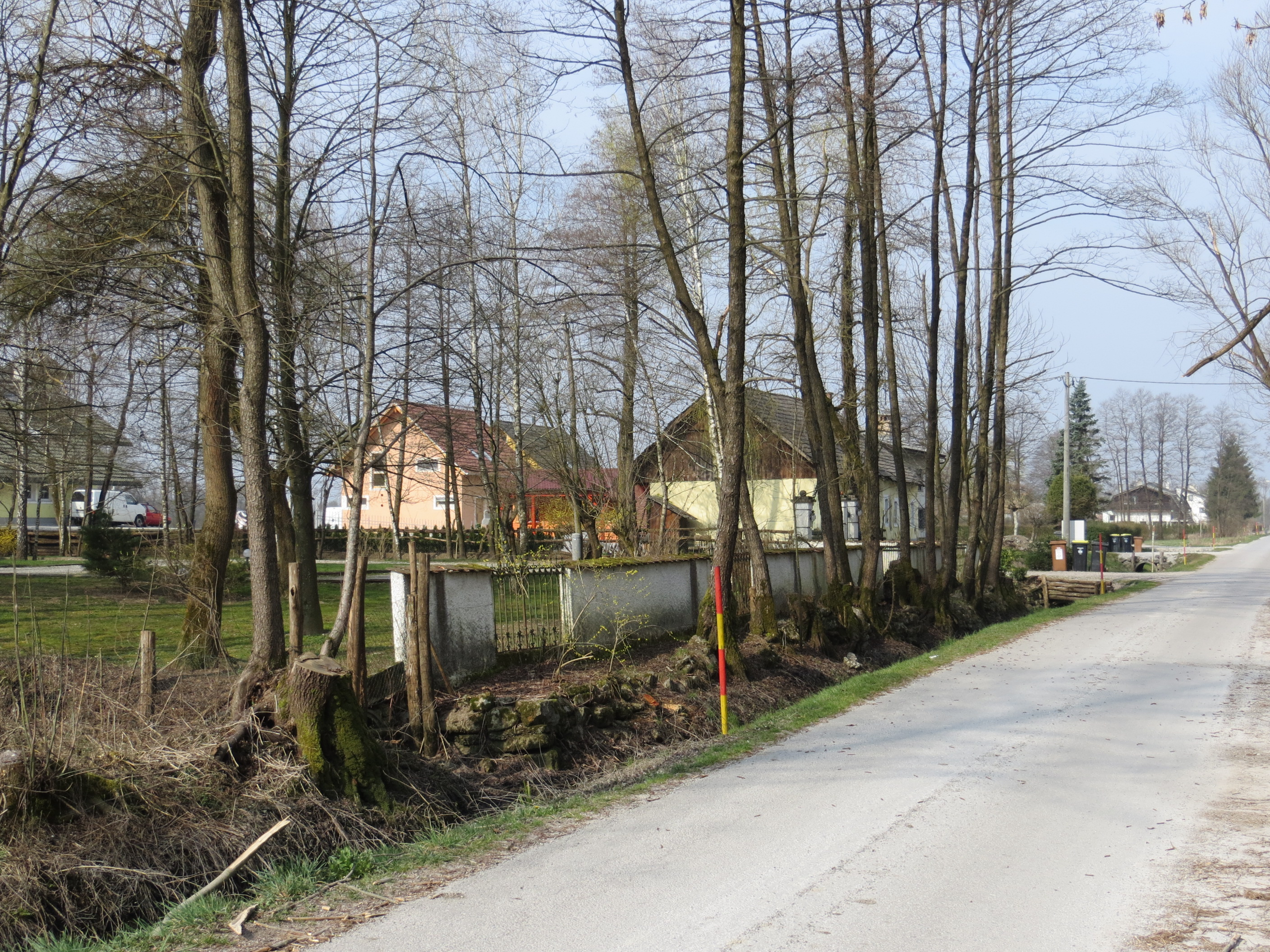
Havptmance

== Recreational and tourist site ==
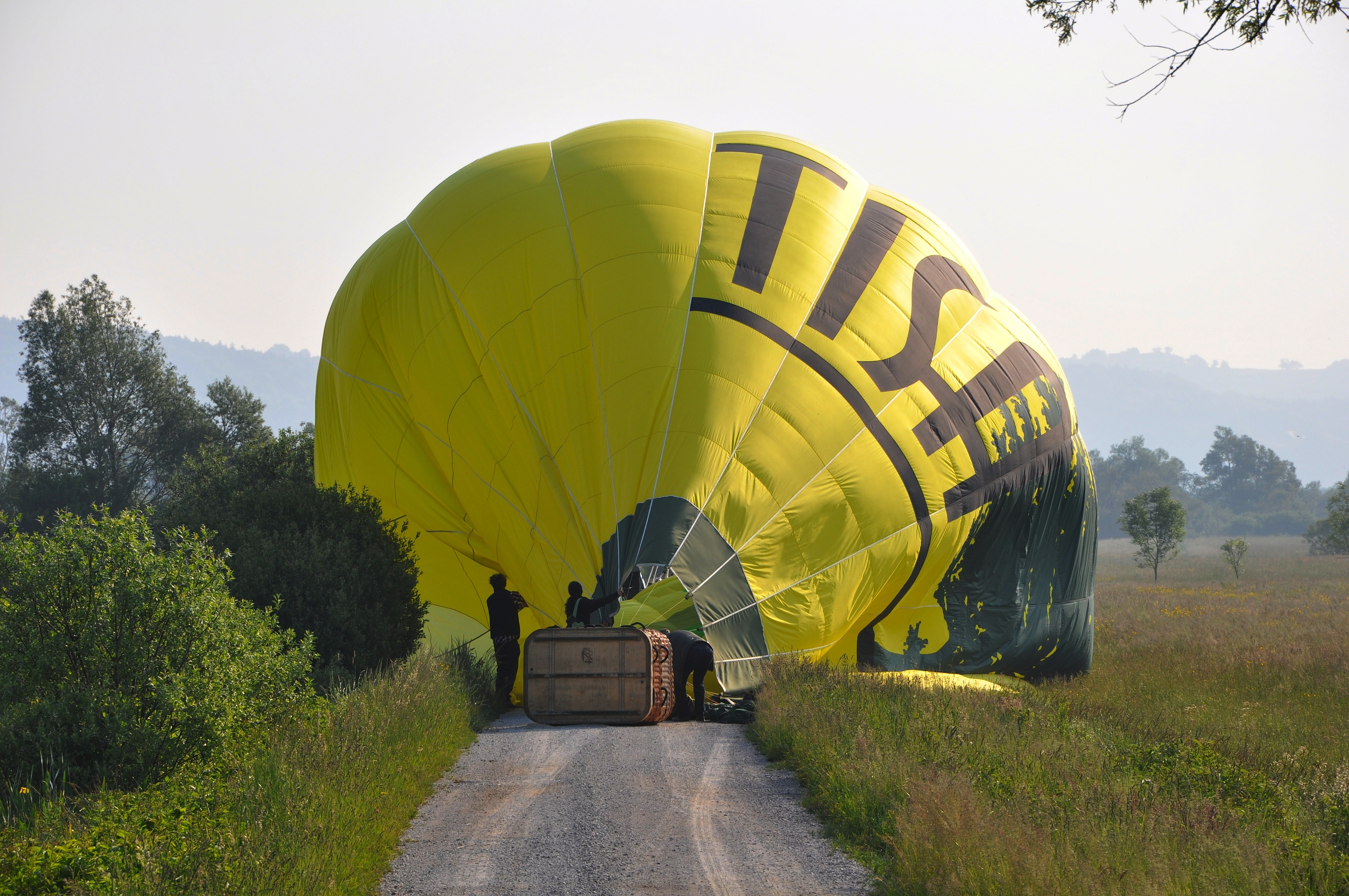
A balloon landing in the marsh

The Ljubljana Marsh is very popular among balloonists.

Accident

On 23 August 2012, a pilot without a valid pilot certificate caused the 2012 balloon crash which occurred on the Ljubljana Marsh, with several people dead and a number of passengers severely burned and injured. New, stricter protocol for pilots was introduced by the authorities to make balloon trips safe.
