= Goričica pod Krimom =

Village in the Municipality of Brezovica in central Slovenia

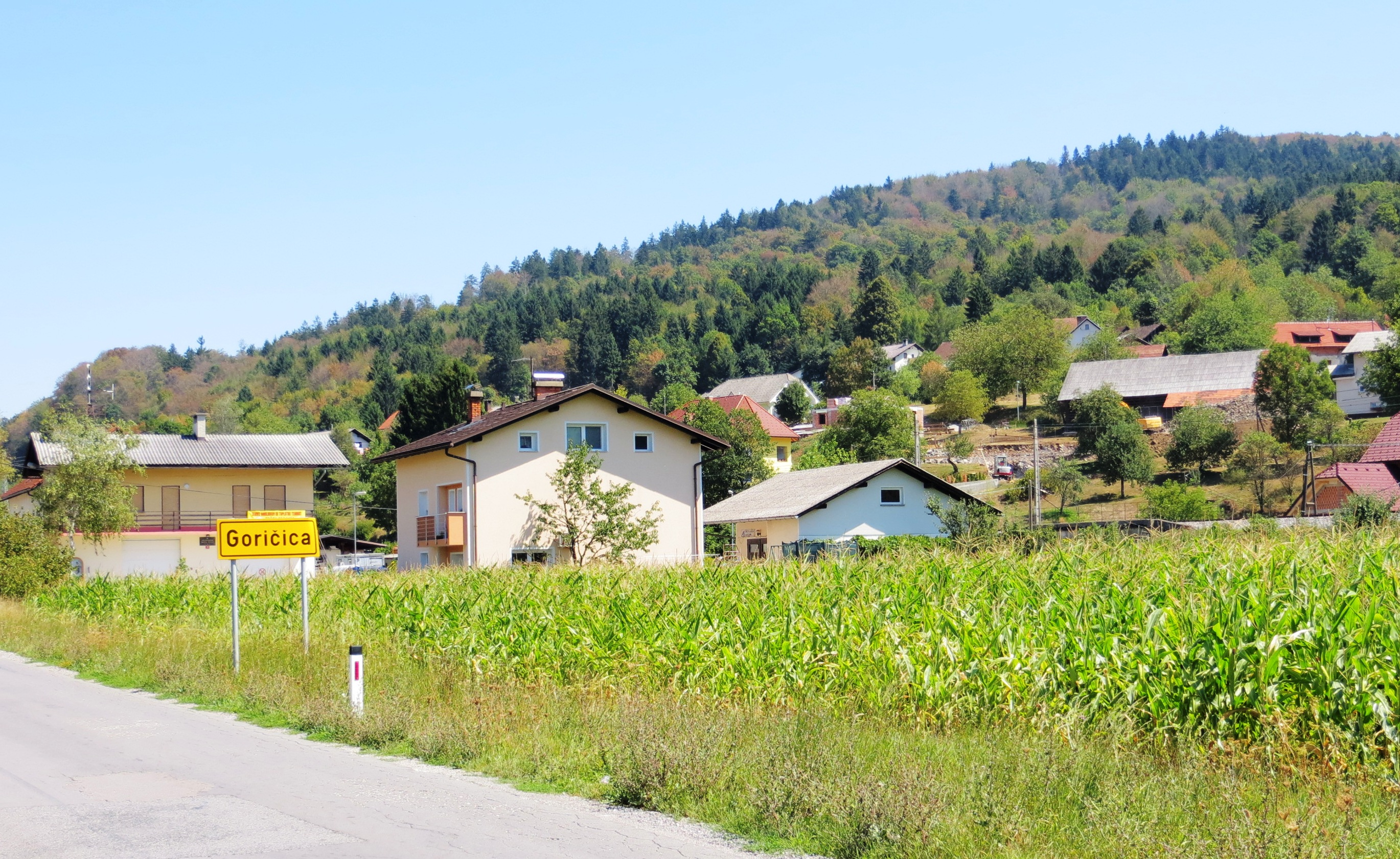

- Location in Slovenia
- Coordinates: 45°57′3.56″N 14°22′43.53″E
- Country: Slovenia
- Traditional region: Inner Carniola
- Statistical region: Central Slovenia
- Municipality: Brezovica

Area
  - Total: 4.09 km^{2} (1.58 sq mi)
- Elevation: 291.5 m (956 ft)

Population (2020)
  - Total: 175
  - Density: 42.8/km^{2} (111/sq mi)
- Postal code: 1292

Goričica pod Krimom (pronounced [ɡɔˈɾiːtʃitsa pɔt ˈkɾiːmɔm]) is a village in the Municipality of Brezovica in central Slovenia. Its territory extends from the right bank of the Ljubljanica River to the foothills of Mount Krim, the dominant peak south of Ljubljana. The municipality is part of the traditional region of Inner Carniola and is now included in the Central Slovenia Statistical Region.

== Name ==
The name of the settlement was changed from Goričica to Goričica pod Krimom in 1953.
