= Podpeč, Brezovica =

Podpeč
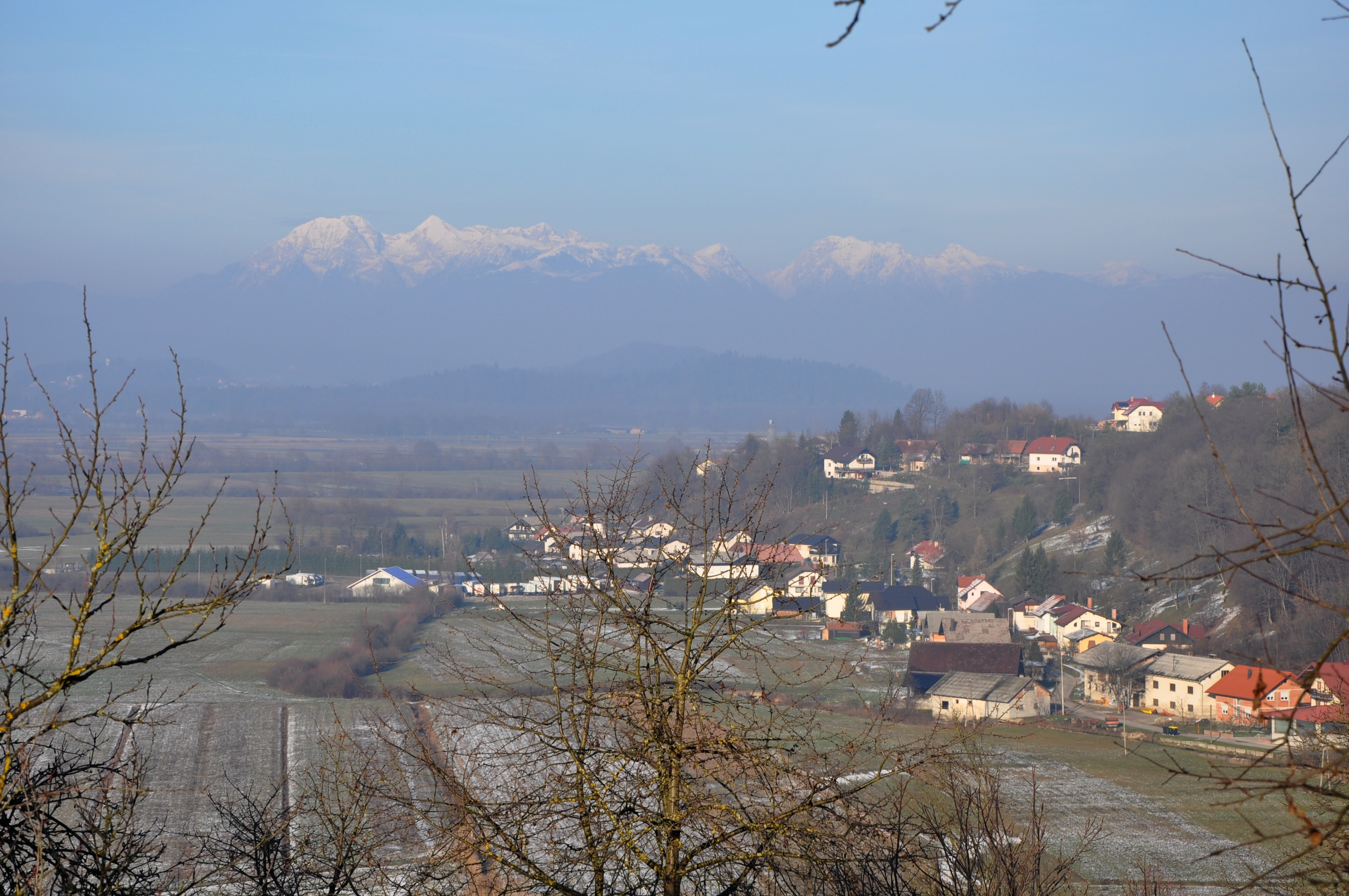

- Location in Slovenia
- Coordinates: 45°58′15.23″N 14°25′2.56″E
- Country: Slovenia
- Traditional region: Inner Carniola
- Statistical region: Central Slovenia
- Municipality: Brezovica

Area
  - Total: 1.76 km^{2} (0.68 sq mi)
- Elevation: 292.5 m (960 ft)

Population (2020)
  - Total: 656
  - Density: 373/km^{2} (965/sq mi)
- Postal code: 1352

Podpeč (pronounced [pɔtˈpeːtʃ]) is a village on the right bank of the Ljubljanica River in the Municipality of Brezovica in central Slovenia. The municipality is part of the traditional region of Inner Carniola and is now included in the Central Slovenia Statistical Region.

Numerous artefacts dating from the Neolithic, Bronze Age, Iron Age, Roman period, and the Middle Ages have been recovered from the river bed of the Ljubljanica. Until the 19th century, Podpeč was an important river port, particularly for the movement of building materials from nearby quarries for use in Ljubljana. The area has been declared an archaeological site of national importance by the Slovenian Ministry of Culture.
