= Videm =

Videm is a place name and a surname that may refer to:

== Places ==
In Italy:

- Udine, known as Videm in Slovene

In Slovenia:

- Krško, a settlement in the Municipality of Krško (known as Videm–Krško from 1953 to 1964), southeastern Slovenia
- Mali Videm, a settlement in the Municipality of Trebnje, southeastern Slovenia
- Municipality of Videm, a municipality, northeastern Slovenia
- Sveti Jurij ob Ščavnici, a settlement in the Municipality of Sveti Jurij ob Ščavnici (known as Videm from 1953 to 1997), northeastern Slovenia
- Veliki Videm, a settlement in the Municipality of Trebnje, southeastern Slovenia
- Videm, Dobrepolje, a settlement in the Municipality of Dobrepolje, southern Slovenia
- Videm, Dol pri Ljubljani, a settlement in the Municipality of Dol pri Ljubljani, central Slovenia
- Videm, Ivančna Gorica, a former settlement in the Municipality of Ivančna Gorica, central Slovenia
- Videm, Krško, a settlement in the Municipality of Krško, southeastern Slovenia
- Videm pri Lukovici, a settlement in the Municipality of Lukovica, central Slovenia
- Videm pri Ptuju, a settlement in the Municipality of Videm, northeastern Slovenia
- Videm pri Temenici, a settlement in the Municipality of Ivančna Gorica, southeastern Slovenia

== People ==
- Vibeke Videm (born 1957), Norwegian physician
