= Gmajna, Ivančna Gorica =

Gmajna
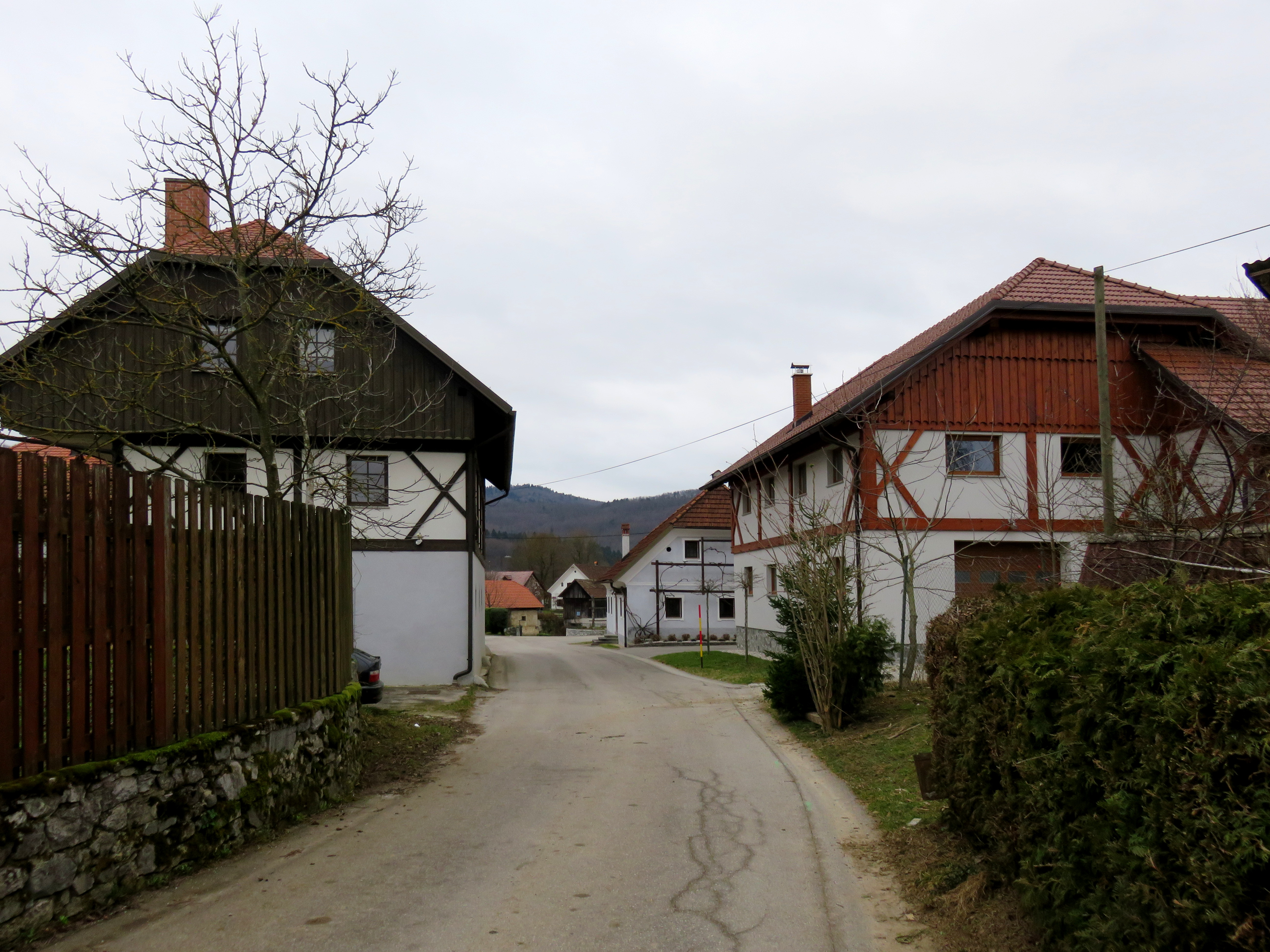

- Location in Slovenia
- Coordinates: 45°52′58″N 14°46′56″E
- Country: Slovenia
- Traditional region: Lower Carniola
- Statistical region: Central Slovenia
- Municipality: Ivančna Gorica
- Elevation: 266 m (873 ft)

Gmajna (pronounced [ˈɡmaːi̯na], German: Gmaina) is a former village in central Slovenia in the Municipality of Ivančna Gorica. It is now part of the village of Krka. It is part of the traditional region of Lower Carniola and is now included in the Central Slovenia Statistical Region.

== Geography ==
Gmajna is a clustered settlement on the left bank of the Krka River. It is located at a bridge across the river leading to the former village of Videm, with road connections north to Trebnja Gorica and east to Gabrovčec.

== Name ==
The name Gmajna means 'commons', referring to land that was jointly owned and used by the village community. The Slovenian common noun gmajna is a borrowing from Middle High German gemeine, with the same meaning, and is found in other Slovene toponyms such as Gmajna near Slovenj Gradec as well as in the diminutive form Gmajnica.

== History ==
During the Second World War, the Partisans destroyed the bridge across the Krka connecting Gmajna with Videm. After the war it was replaced with a temporary wooden structure.

Gmajna ceased to exist as a separate settlement in 1953, when it and the former village of Videm were merged into a single settlement named Krka.
