= Krka Cave =

Cave in Slovenia

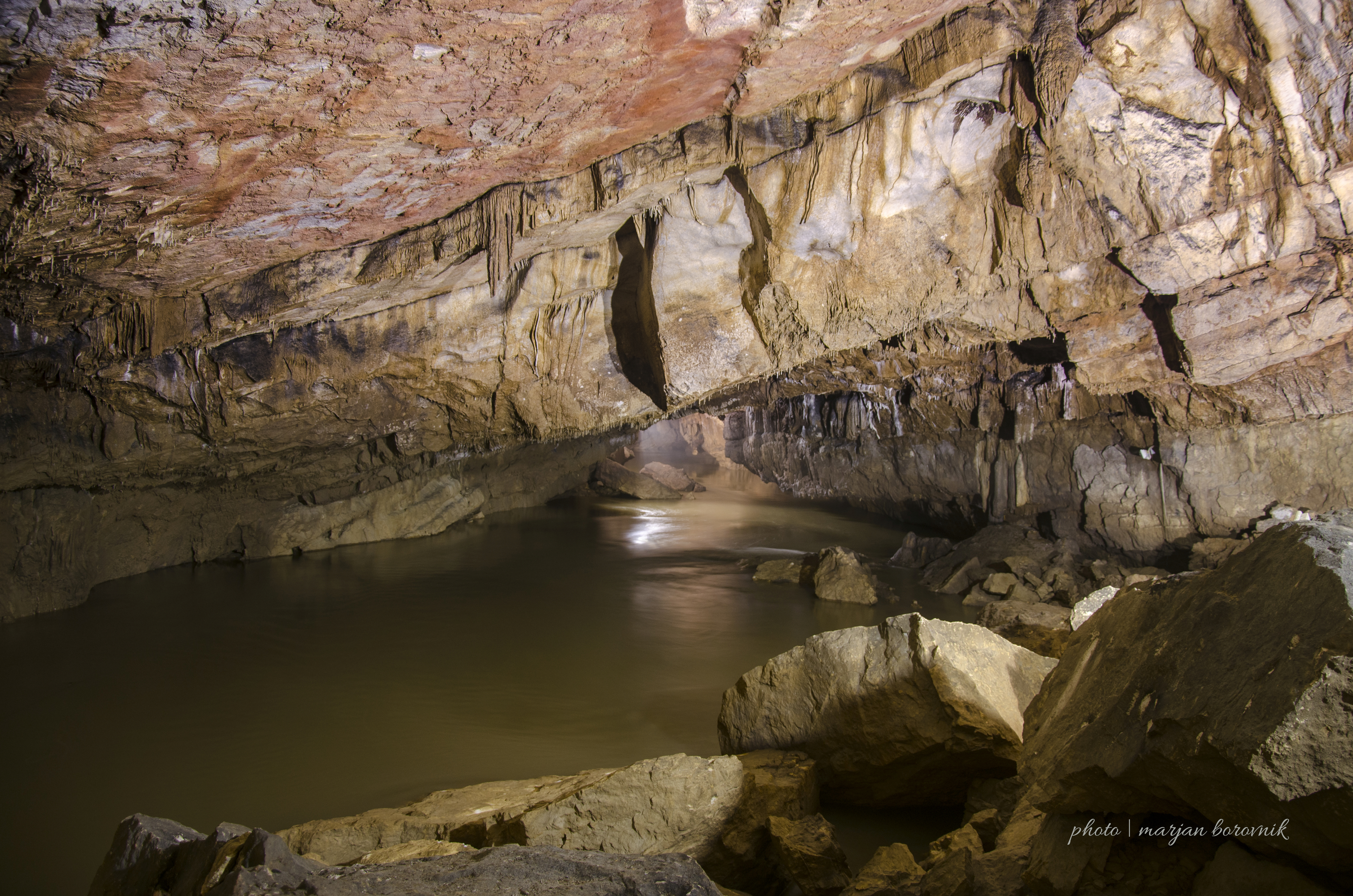
- Krka Cave flooded in November 2016

- Location within Slovenia
- Location: above the spring of the Krka River; north of the village of Krka, central Slovenia
- Coordinates: 45°53′24″N 14°46′16.68″E
- Depth: 44 m or 144 ft
- Length: 820 m or 2,690 ft
- Geology: horizontal karst cave
- Entrances: 2
- Access: in the presence of a tourist guide
- Cave survey: Jan Vladimír Hráský, 1887
- Registry: Cave E-Cadastre: no. 74
- Website: tdkrka.si

Krka Cave (Slovene: Krška jama) is a horizontal karst cave and an occasional source of the Krka River in Dry Carniola, central Slovenia. It lies in a pocket valley between the villages of Trebnja Gorica to the east and Gradiček to the west, north of the village of Krka. Water flows into the cave from the Račna Karst Field south of the town of Grosuplje and emerges a few metres below the cave's main entrance in the karst spring of the Krka. The cave, which is of archaeological and historical significance and features great fauna diversity, is open to announced tourist visits in the presence of a guide and also used as an event venue.

== Description ==
=== Entrances ===
The main entrance lies on the southern side of the cave and is secured with grates. Stone stairs lead to it from the source lake of the Krka. Due to the frequent flooding of the cultivated Račna Karst Field, it was widened with explosives in 1937 to ease the water outflow. In heavy downpours, the Krka bursts through it and flows in a torrential waterfall over the steps in front of the cave. Up in a wall next to it, there is a small side entrance.

=== Interior ===
The dry part of the cave has a length of 210 metres (690 ft) and a width of 30 m (98 ft). Its central part serves as a canal in heavy downpours. At the end of the dry part, there is a 30 m (98 ft)-long sump lake continuing into a system of tunnels. The total explored tunnel length is 490 m (1,610 ft). The cave decoration is rather scarce; much of it has been destroyed due to earthquakes and vandalism. For this reason, the cave has since 1995 been locked and is accessible only in the presence of a guide. Dripstones are rare; the ceiling is formed by rock layers and remains of flowstones. Numerous pareidolias can be seen.

=== Biodiversity ===
Krka Cave is home to over 30 animal species, including bats and olms. The 19th-century writer Fran Erjavec found a hitherto unknown beetle in it, and the crustacean Typhlocypris cavicola is endemic to the cave.

== History ==
As evidenced by the 1956 finding of the Lengyel ceramics, the cave was already frequented in the Neolithic. In the 15th and 16th centuries, the locals hid there during the Ottoman invasions, as described in the story Jurij Kozjak (1864) of the 19th-century Slovene writer Josip Jurčič, born in the vicinity. In the 17th century, the cave was visited by the polymath Valvasor. For the first time, it was surveyed by Jan Vladimír Hráský in 1887. Since 1927, it has been registered in the cadastre of Slovenian caves under number 74. Today, it occasionally serves as a concert venue for renowned Slovenian and Croatian musicians, e.g. choir singers at Christmas, Siddharta (2008), or Zlatan Stipišić Gibonni (2010).
