= Hrib, Lukovica =

Hrib
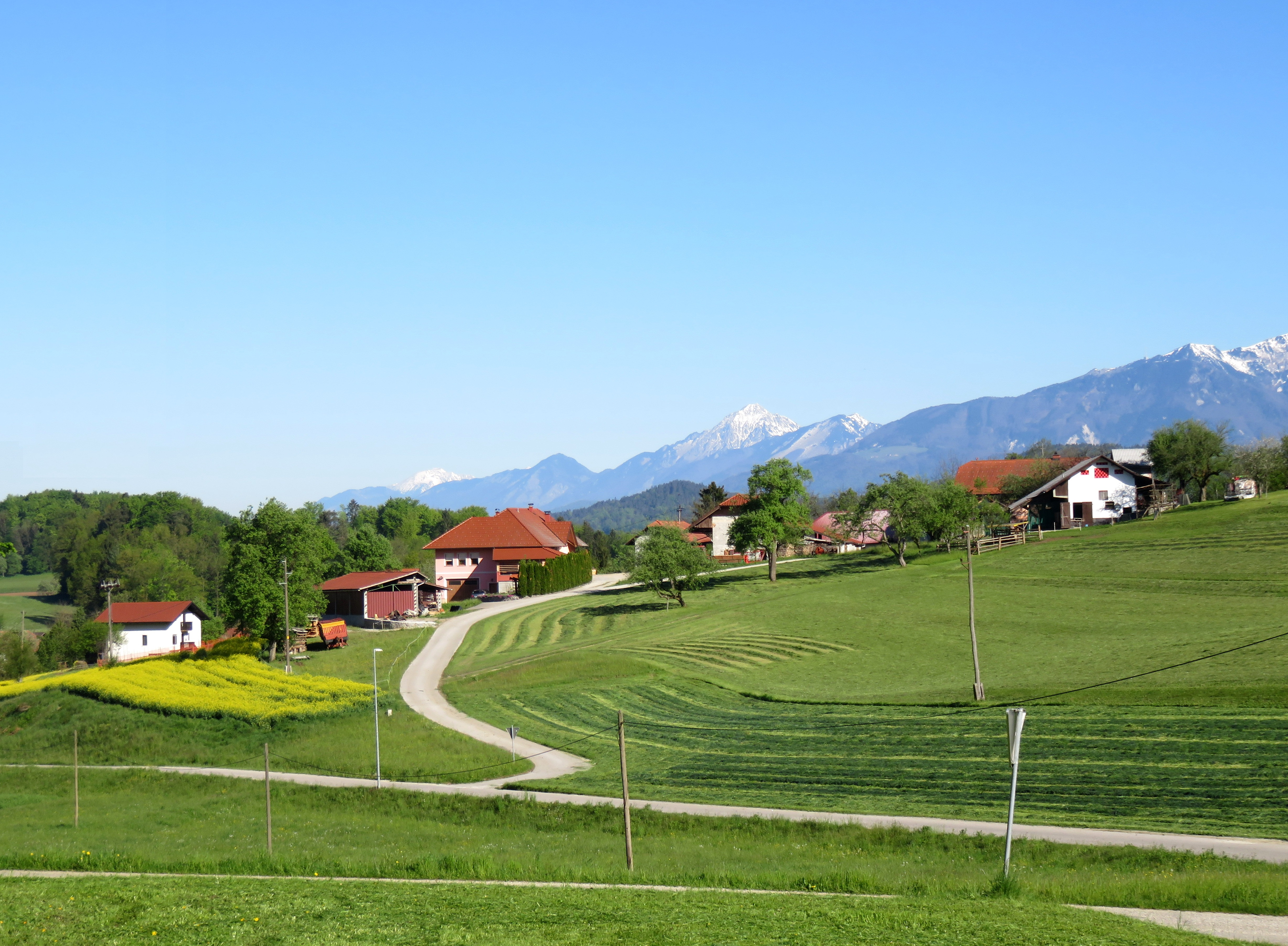

- Location in Slovenia
- Coordinates: 46°09′05″N 14°41′37″E
- Country: Slovenia
- Traditional region: Upper Carniola
- Statistical region: Central Slovenia
- Municipality: Lukovica
- Elevation: 350 m (1,150 ft)

Hrib (pronounced [ˈxɾiːp]) is a former village in central Slovenia in the Municipality of Lukovica. It is now part of the village of Videm pri Lukovici. It is part of the traditional region of Upper Carniola and is now included in the Central Slovenia Statistical Region.

== Geography ==
Hrib stands east of the main part of Videm pri Lukovici. It consists of two farms.

== Name ==
The name Hrib is derived from the common noun hrib 'hill', referring to the physical location of the village. It is a common place name, shared by several settlements in Slovenia. Hrib stands on a hill that rises about 21 meters (69 ft) higher than the main part of Videm pri Lukovici.

== History ==
Hrib had a population of 16 (in two houses) in 1900. Hrib was annexed by Videm pri Lukovici in 1953, ending its existence as a separate settlement.
