= Velike Lese =

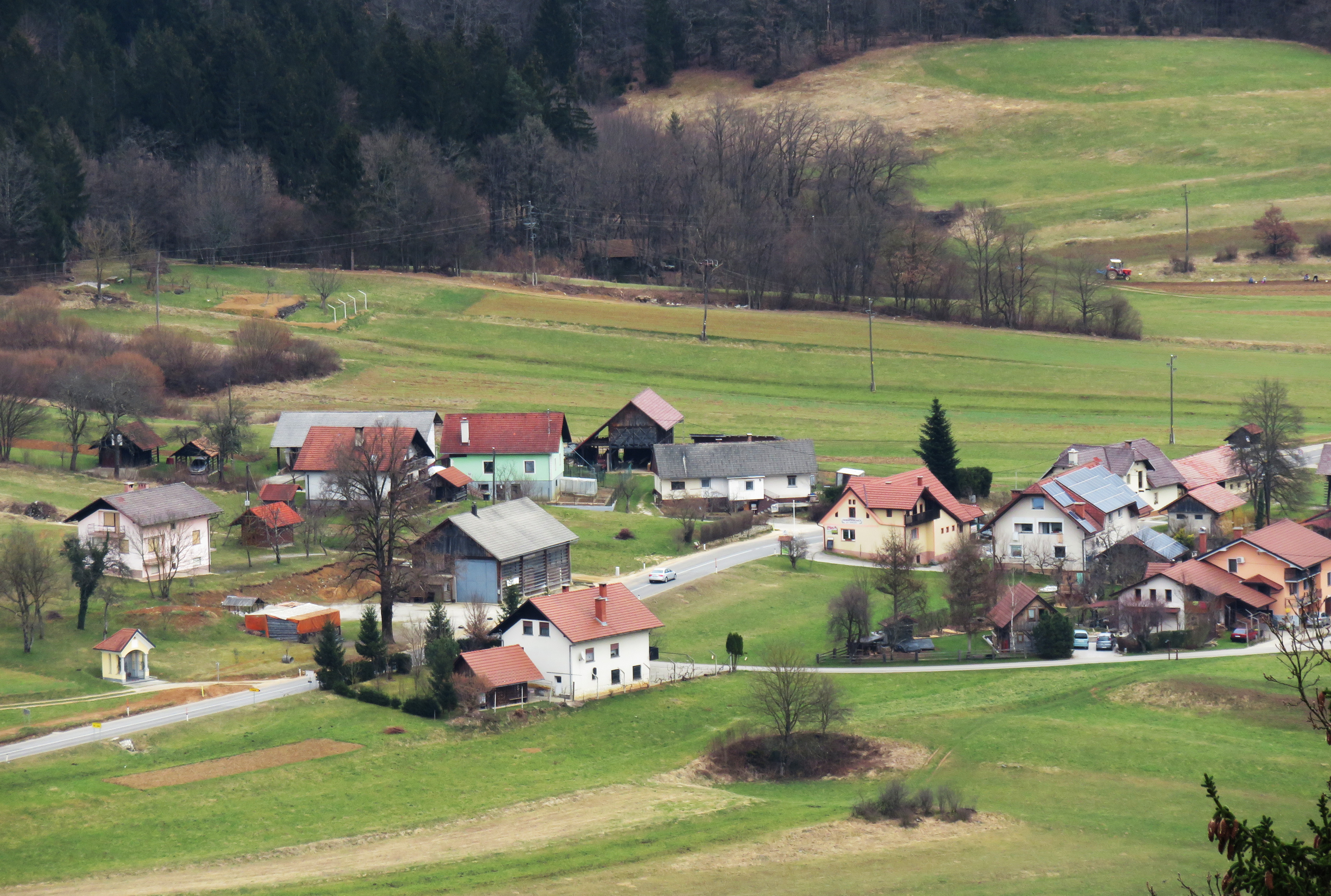

- Location in Slovenia
- Coordinates: 45°52′19.44″N 14°48′26.7″E
- Country: Slovenia
- Traditional region: Lower Carniola
- Statistical region: Central Slovenia
- Municipality: Ivančna Gorica

Area
  - Total: 0.93 km^{2} (0.36 sq mi)
- Elevation: 266 m (873 ft)

Population (2002)
  - Total: 119

Velike Lese (pronounced [ˈʋeːlikɛ ˈleːsɛ]; German: Großlesse) is a village on the left bank of the Krka River in the Municipality of Ivančna Gorica in central Slovenia. The area is part of the historical region of Lower Carniola. The municipality is now included in the Central Slovenia Statistical Region.

== Church ==
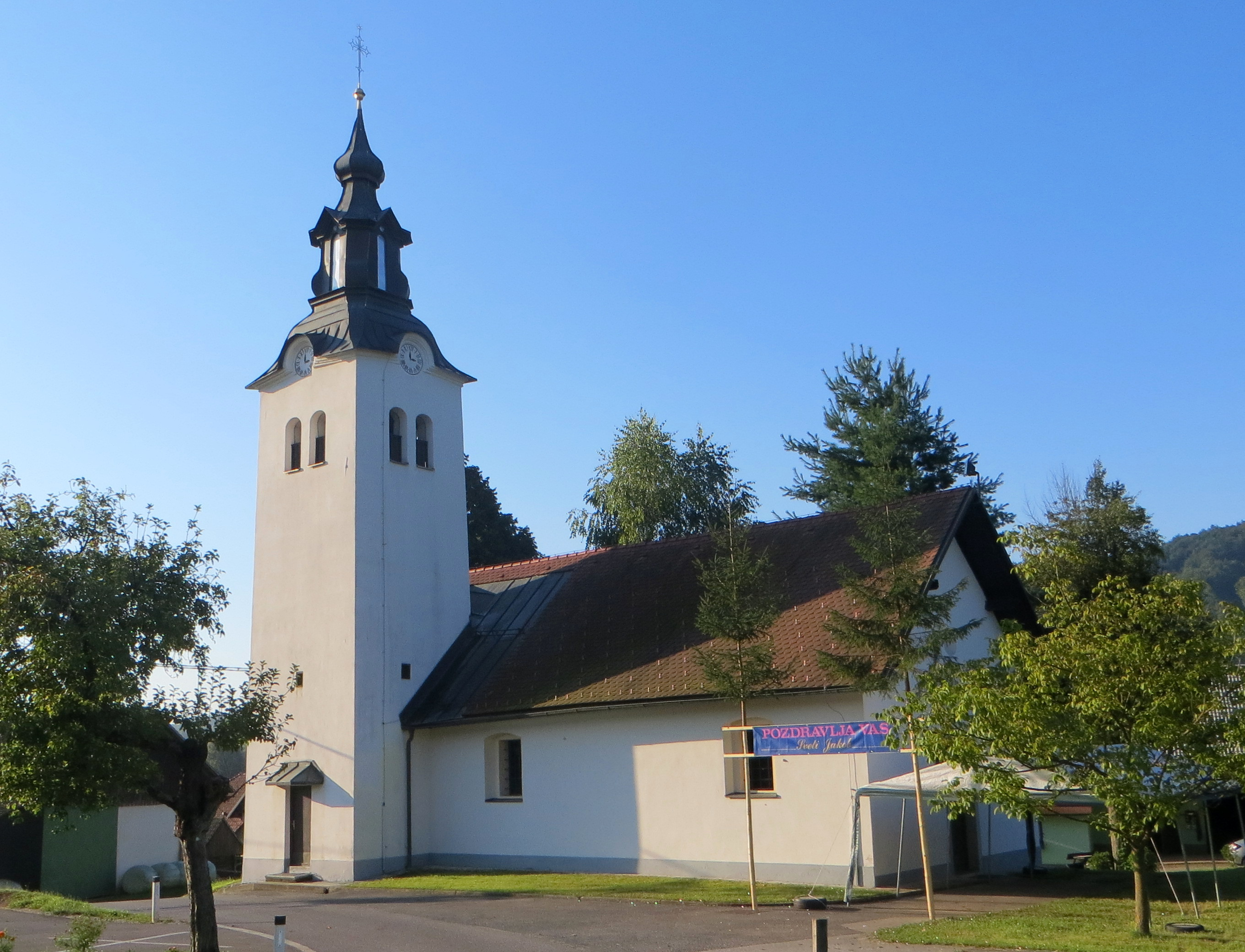
Saint James's Church

The local church is dedicated to Saint James (Slovene: sveti Jakob) and belongs to the Parish of Krka. It dates to the second half of the 17th century and was partially rebuilt in the 19th century.
