= Zavrtače =

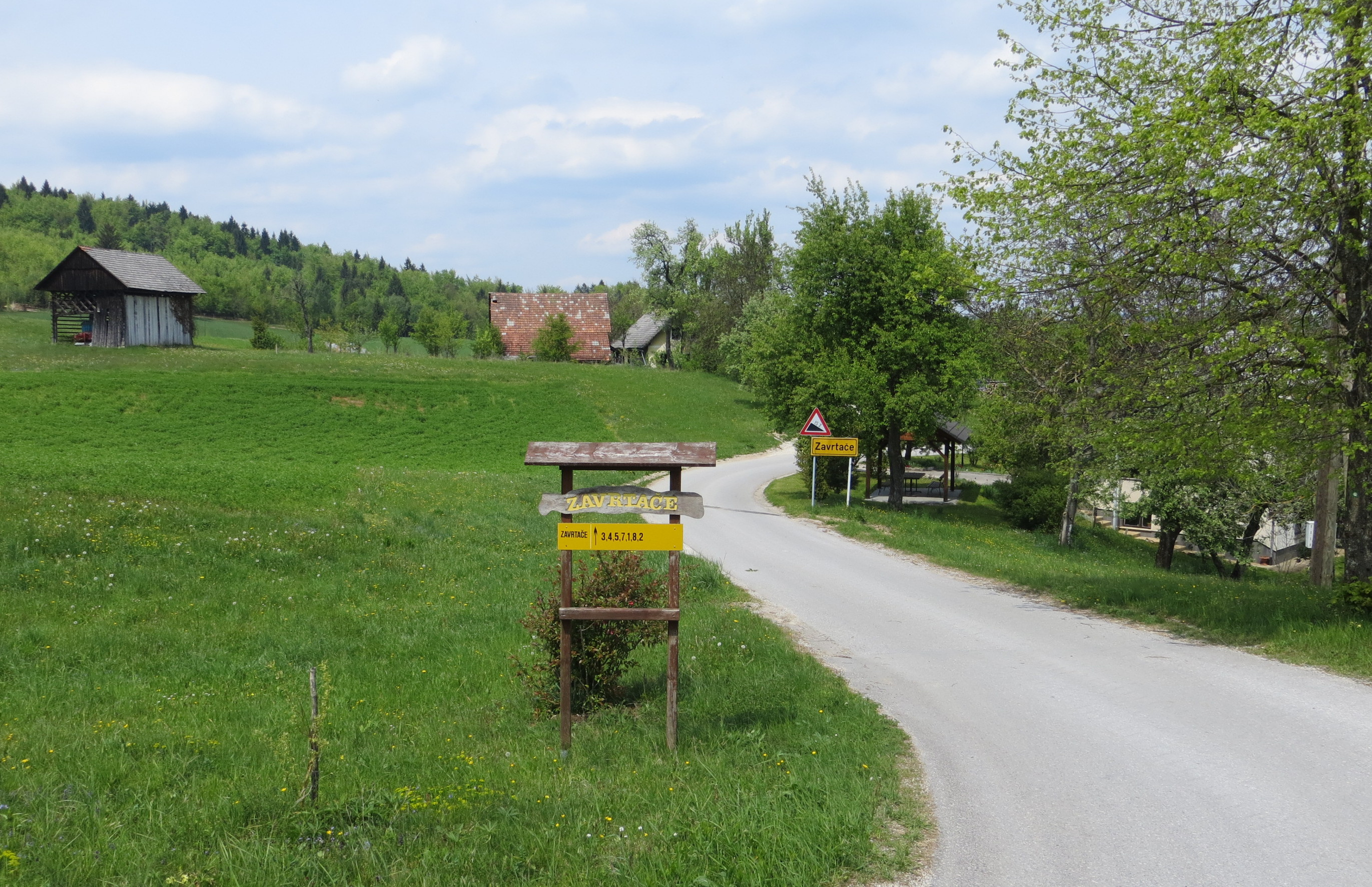

- Location in Slovenia
- Coordinates: 45°55′45.76″N 14°45′24.03″E
- Country: Slovenia
- Traditional region: Lower Carniola
- Statistical region: Central Slovenia
- Municipality: Ivančna Gorica

Area
  - Total: 1.32 km^{2} (0.51 sq mi)
- Elevation: 545.4 m (1,789 ft)

Population (2002)
  - Total: 19

Zavrtače (pronounced [zaʋəɾˈtaːtʃɛ]) is a settlement in the hills to the southeast of Višnja Gora in the Municipality of Ivančna Gorica in the historical region of Lower Carniola in central Slovenia. The municipality is included in the Central Slovenia Statistical Region.

== Church ==
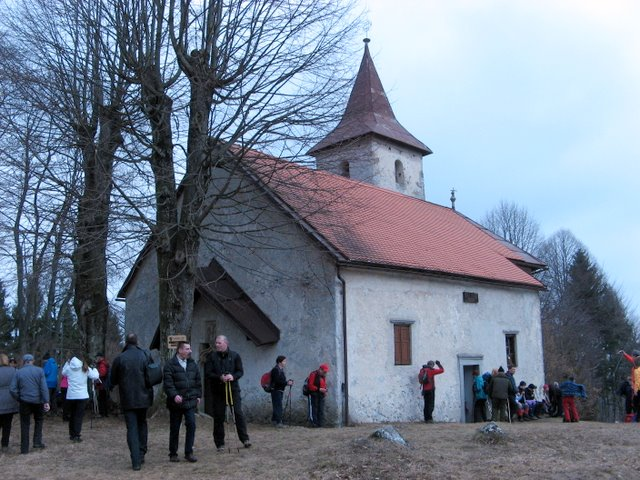
Holy Spirit Church

The local church, built on an isolated hill south of the settlement, is dedicated to the Holy Spirit and belongs to the Parish of Krka. It dates to the 16th century.
