= Muljava =

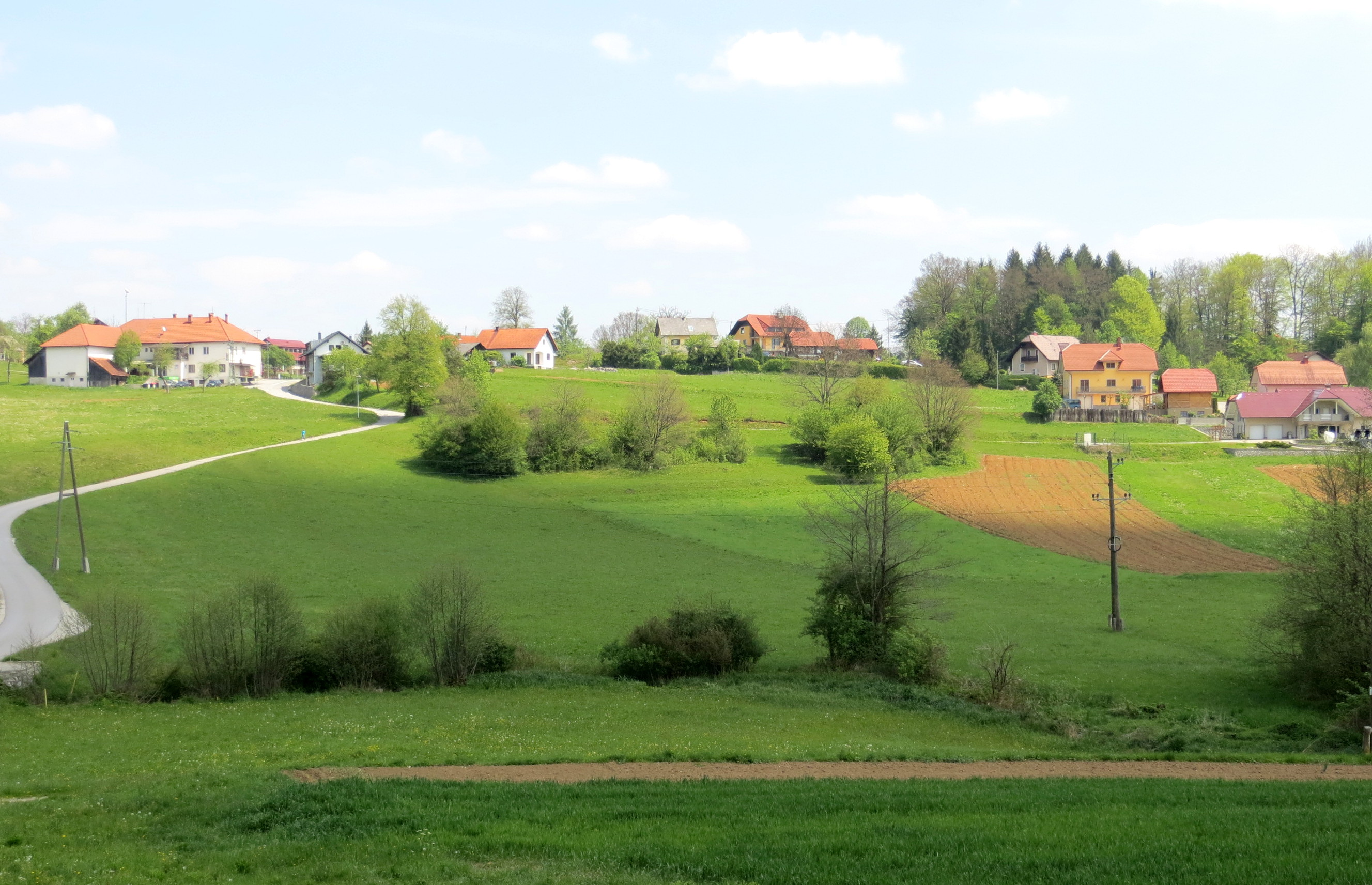

- Location in Slovenia
- Coordinates: 45°54′6.61″N 14°47′55.25″E
- Country: Slovenia
- Traditional region: Lower Carniola
- Statistical region: Central Slovenia
- Municipality: Ivančna Gorica
- Elevation: 319.3 m (1,048 ft)

Population (2002)
  - Total: 270

Muljava (pronounced [muˈljaːʋa]; German: Mulau) is a village in the Municipality of Ivančna Gorica in central Slovenia. The area is part of the traditional region of Lower Carniola. The municipality is now included in the Central Slovenia Statistical Region.

== History ==
Muljava was originally two villages: Muljava and Zavod. The two were united into a single village when house numbers were assigned in the village.

== Jurčič farm ==
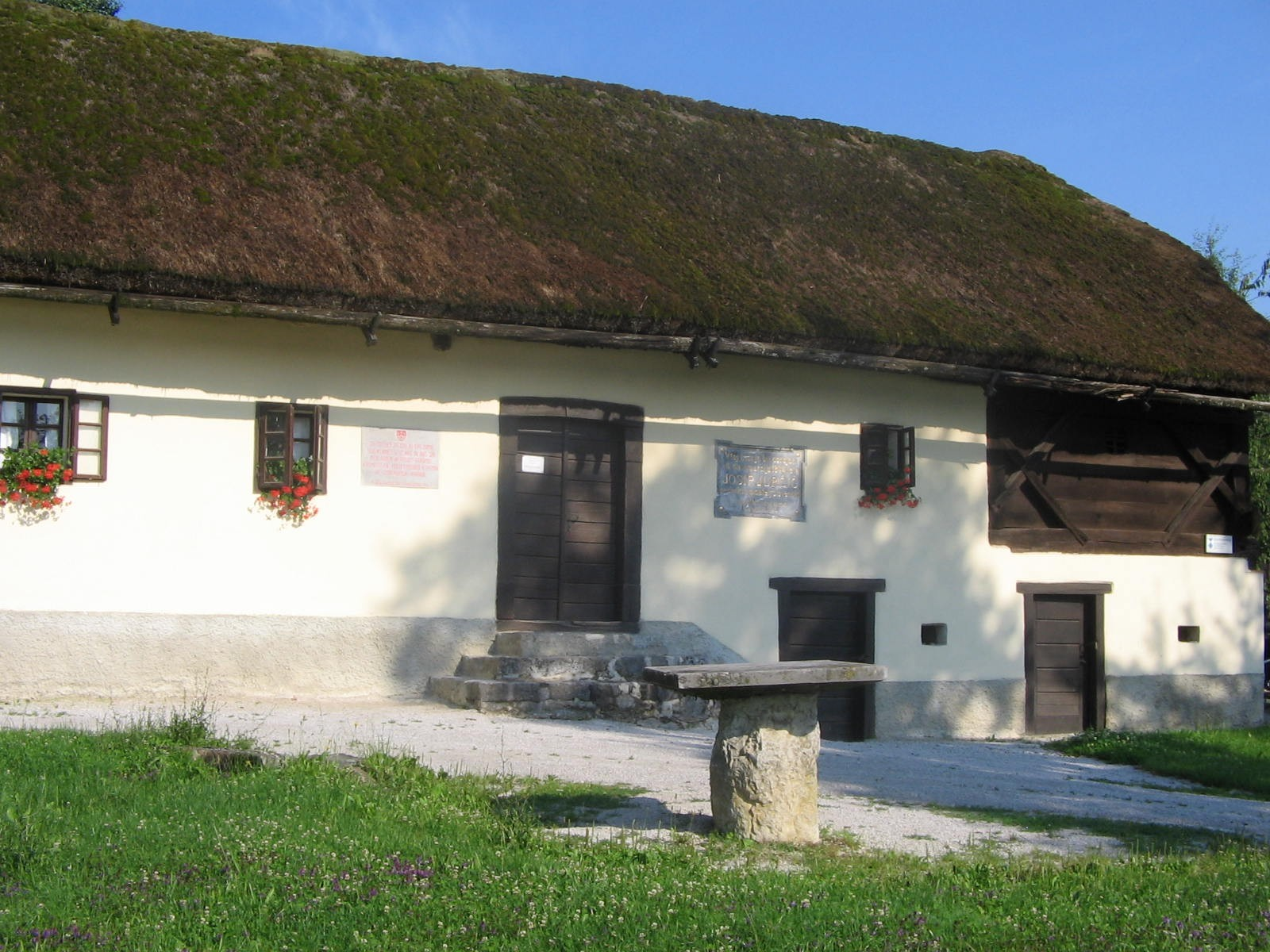
Josip Jurčič's birthplace in Muljava

Muljava is best known as the birthplace of the Slovene writer Josip Jurčič and the farm where he was born is now a small museum.

== Church ==
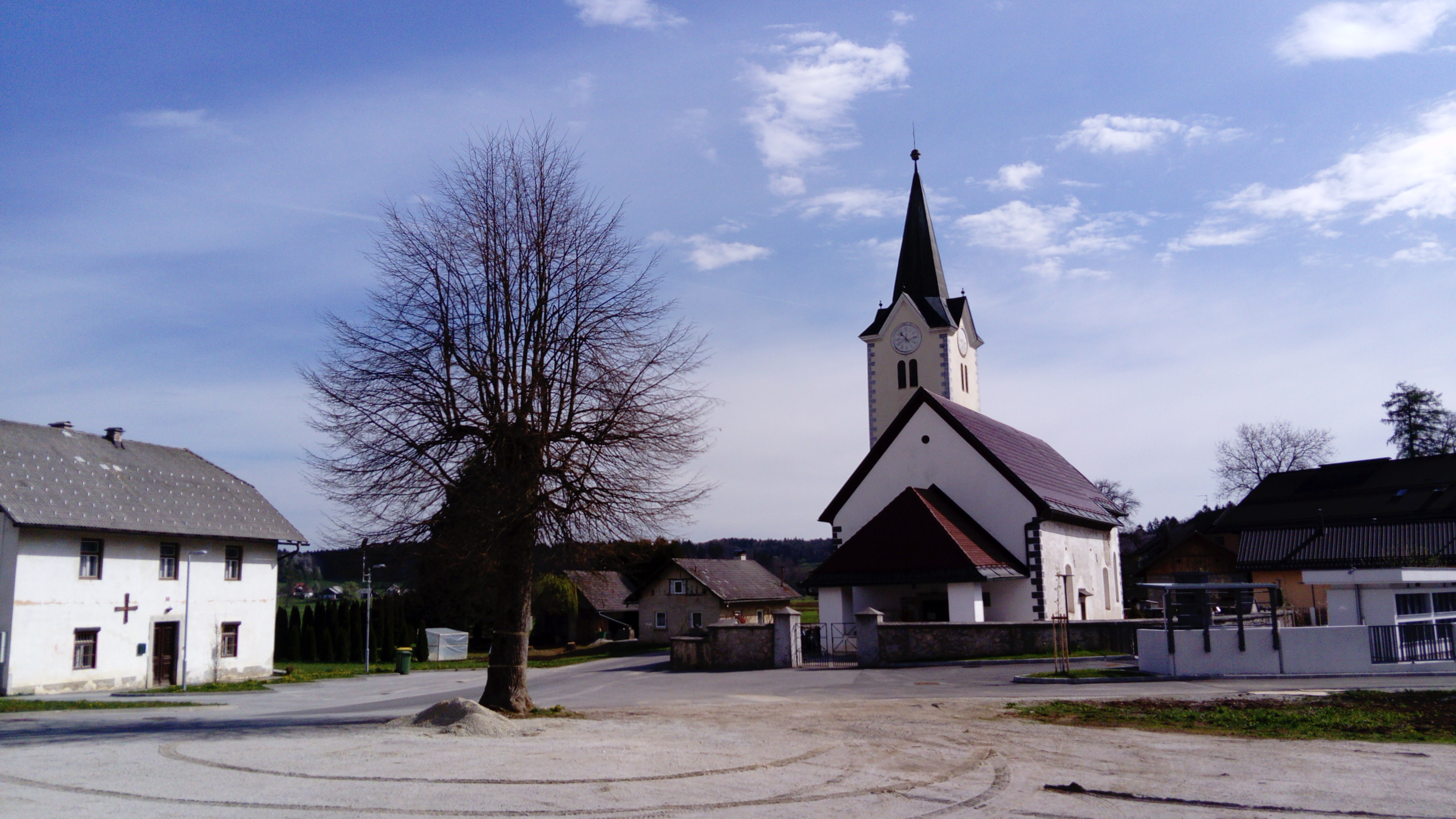
Assumption of Mary Church in Muljava

The local church is dedicated to the Assumption of Mary and belongs to the Parish of Krka.
