= Typhlocypris cavicola =

Conservation status
- Vulnerable (IUCN 2.3)

Scientific classification
- Kingdom: Animalia
- Phylum: Arthropoda
- Class: Ostracoda
- Order: Podocopida
- Family: Candonidae
- Genus: Typhlocypris
- Species: T. cavicola

Binomial name
- Typhlocypris cavicola (Klie, 1935)

Species of seed shrimp

Typhlocypris cavicola is a species of ostracod crustacean in the family Candonidae. It is endemic to Slovenia, where it is only known from Krka Cave.
