= Josip Jurčič =

Slovene writer and journalist

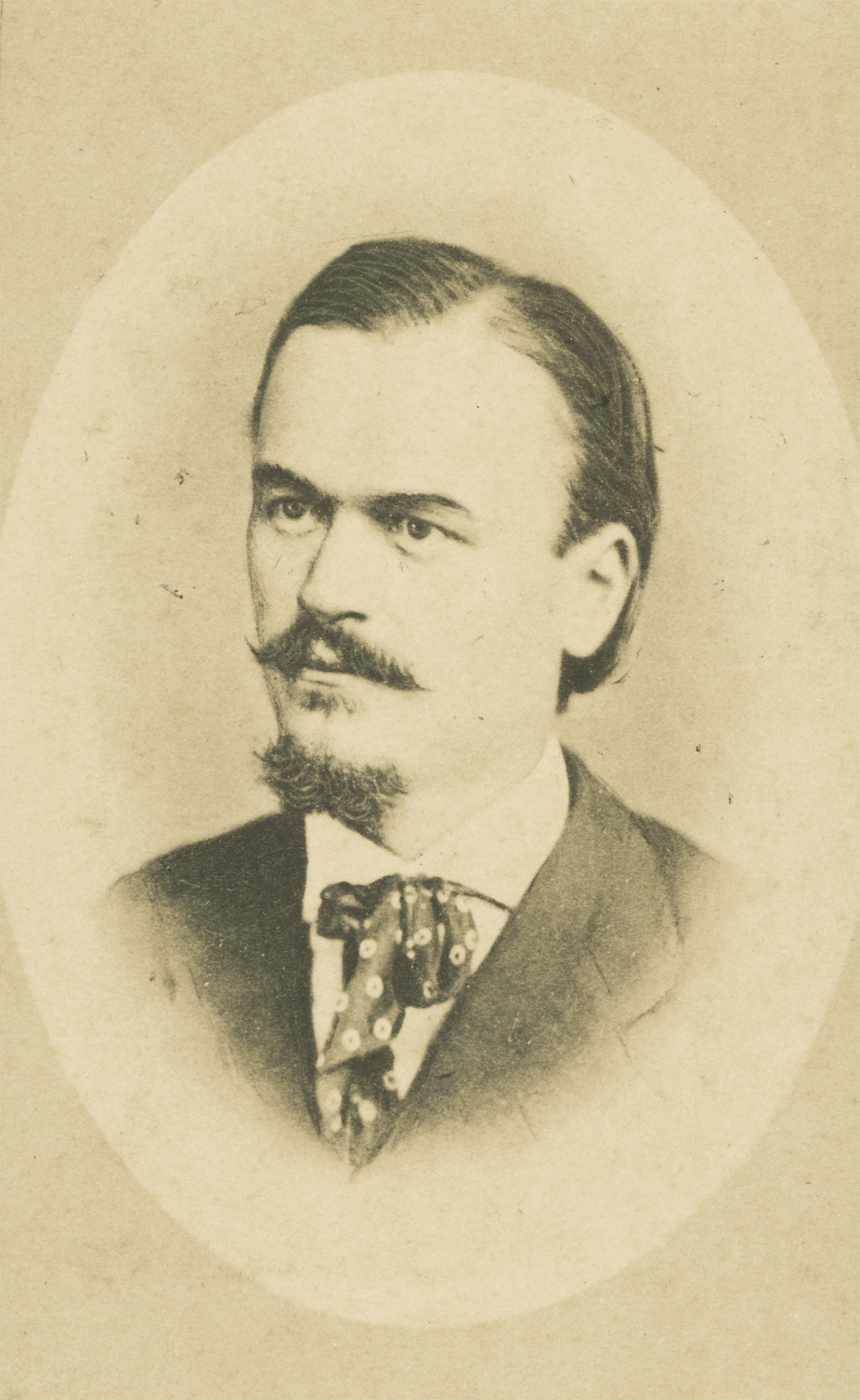
Josip Jurčič, photo by Ernest Pogorelc

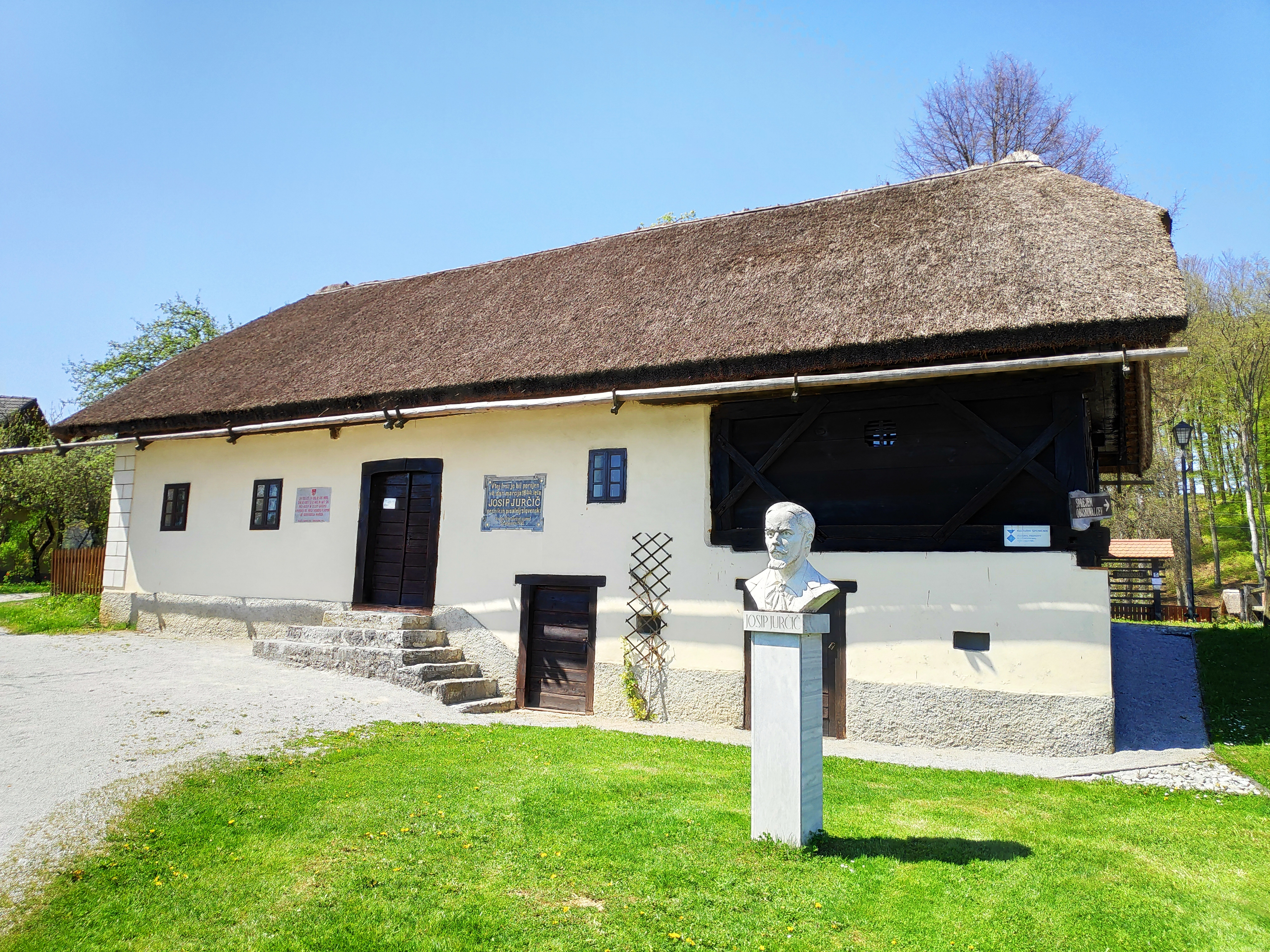
Josip Jurčič's birthplace in Muljava is now a museum.

Josip Jurčič (4 March 1844 – 3 May 1881) was a Slovene writer and journalist. He was born in Muljava, Austrian Empire (now part of the municipality of Ivančna Gorica, Slovenia) and baptized Josephus Jurshizh. He died from tuberculosis in Ljubljana.

Jurčič followed the literary program proposed by Fran Levstik and was one of the most influential Slovene romantic realists.

The 15.6 km (9.7 mi)-long Jurčič Trail (Slovene: Jurčičeva pot) from Višnja Gora (where he attended primary school; he also attended school in Videm) through Muljava to the source of the Krka River and Krka Cave is named after him. The house where he was born is now an open-air museum.

== Selected works ==
- Pripovedka o beli kači (1861) (The Tale of the White Snake)
- Spomini na deda (1863) (Memories of Grandfather)
- Jurij Kozjak, slovenski janičar (1864) (Jurij Kozjak, a Slovene Janissary)
- Deseti brat (1866) (The Tenth Brother); now recognized as the first Slovene novel
- Veronika Deseniška (1881); a play
- Kozlovska sodba v Višnji Gori (1867) (The Famous Goat Trial); a humorous short story
