= Videm, Ivančna Gorica =

Videm
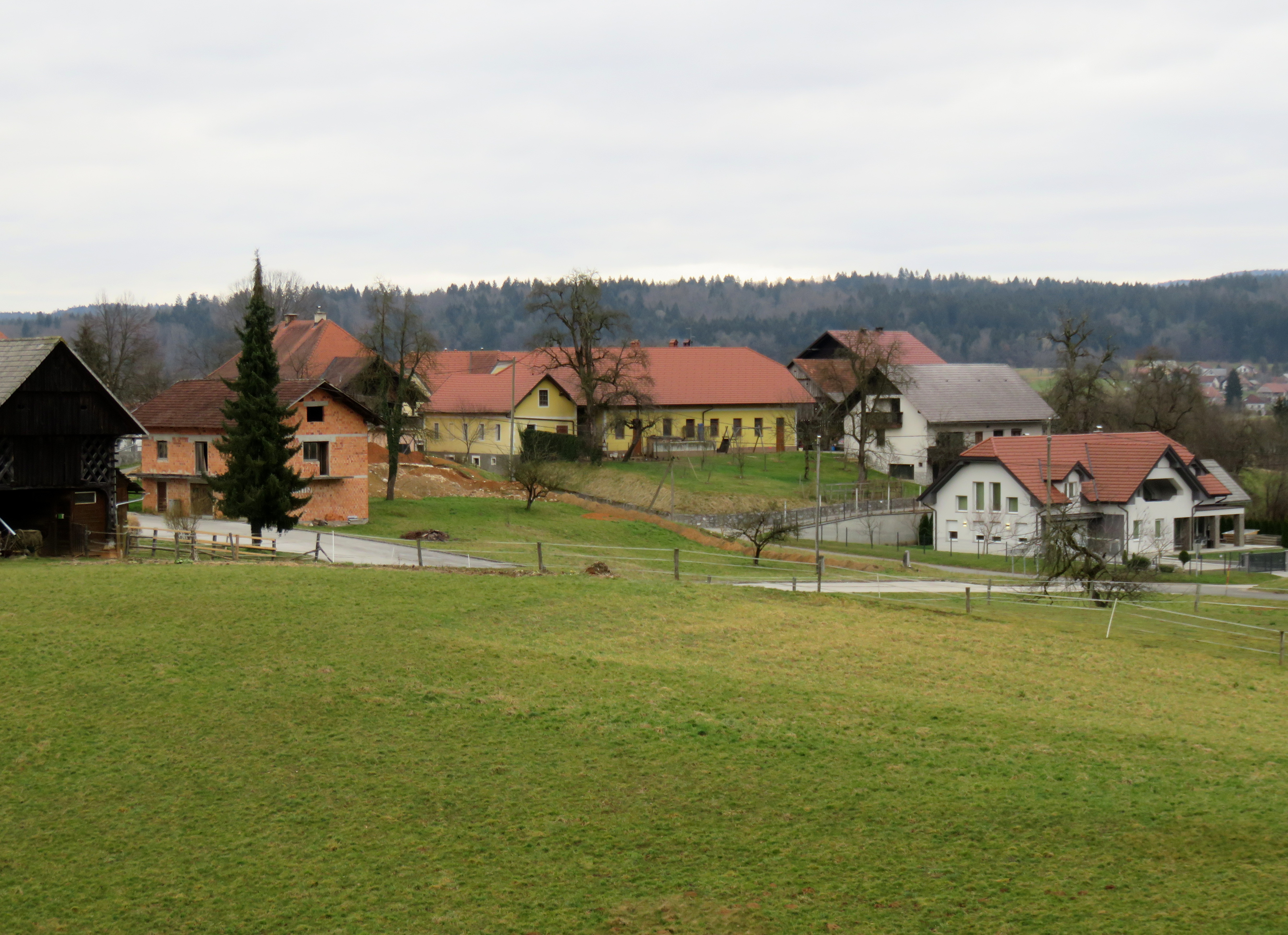

- Location in Slovenia
- Coordinates: 45°52′52″N 14°46′41″E
- Country: Slovenia
- Traditional region: Lower Carniola
- Statistical region: Central Slovenia
- Municipality: Ivančna Gorica
- Elevation: 280 m (920 ft)

Videm (pronounced [ˈʋiːdəm], German: Widem) is a former village in central Slovenia in the Municipality of Ivančna Gorica. It is now part of the village of Krka. It is part of the traditional region of Lower Carniola and is now included in the Central Slovenia Statistical Region.

== Geography ==
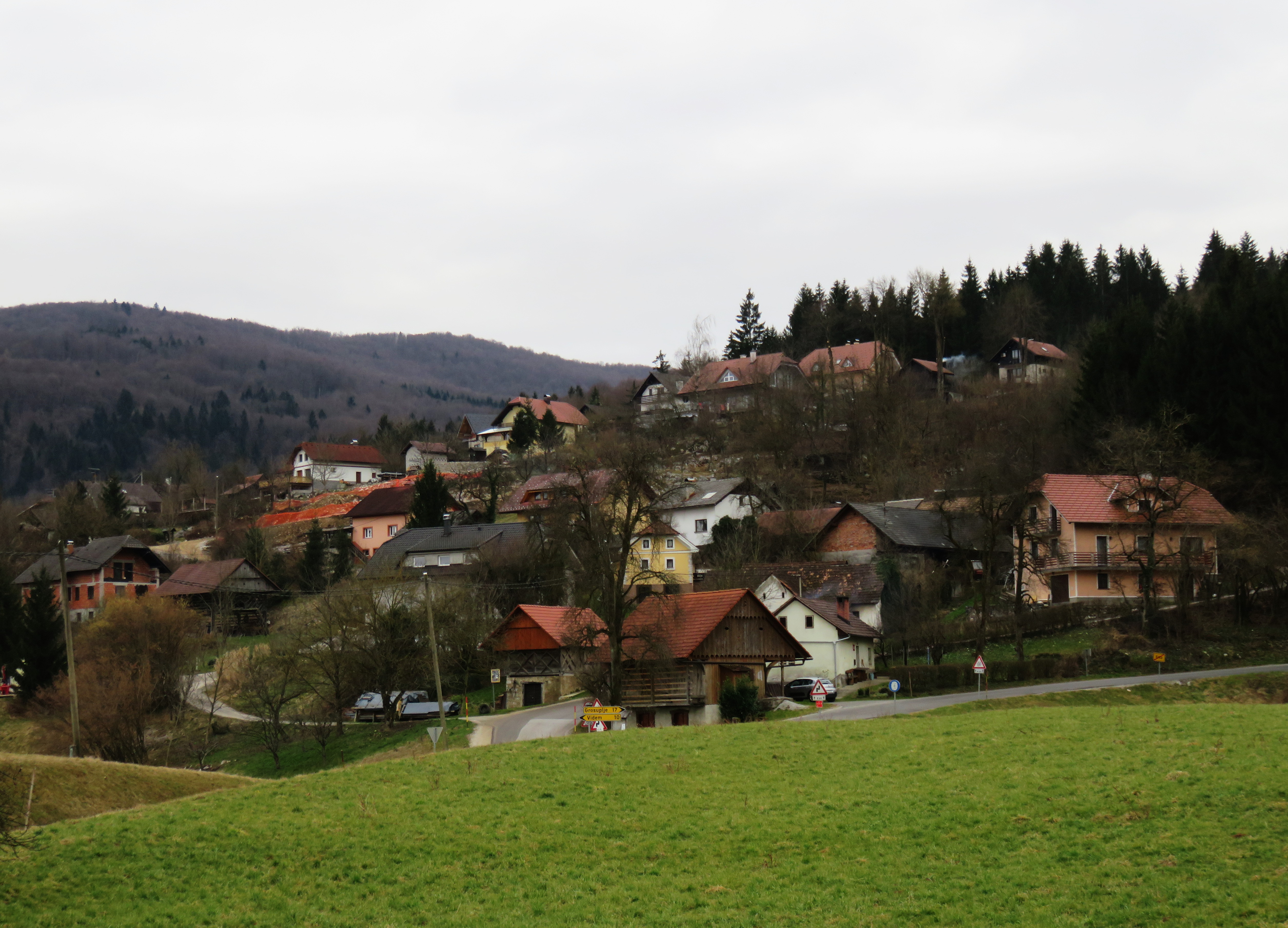
The hamlet of Mali Videm

Videm lies above the right bank of the Krka River along the old main road from Grosuplje to Krška Vas. The soil is fertile and the surrounding woods are mostly deciduous. The appertaining hamlet of Mali Videm (literally, 'little Videm') lies just to the southwest. Srebot Hill (Slovene: Srebotov hrib, elevation: 662 meters or 2,172 feet)—also known as Srobotov hrib and Kamni vrh 'Stone Peak'—rises to the south. There are tilled fields below the road to Grosuplje and along the Krka River toward Gradiček; at lower elevations there are meadows that are subject to flooding by the river.

== Name ==
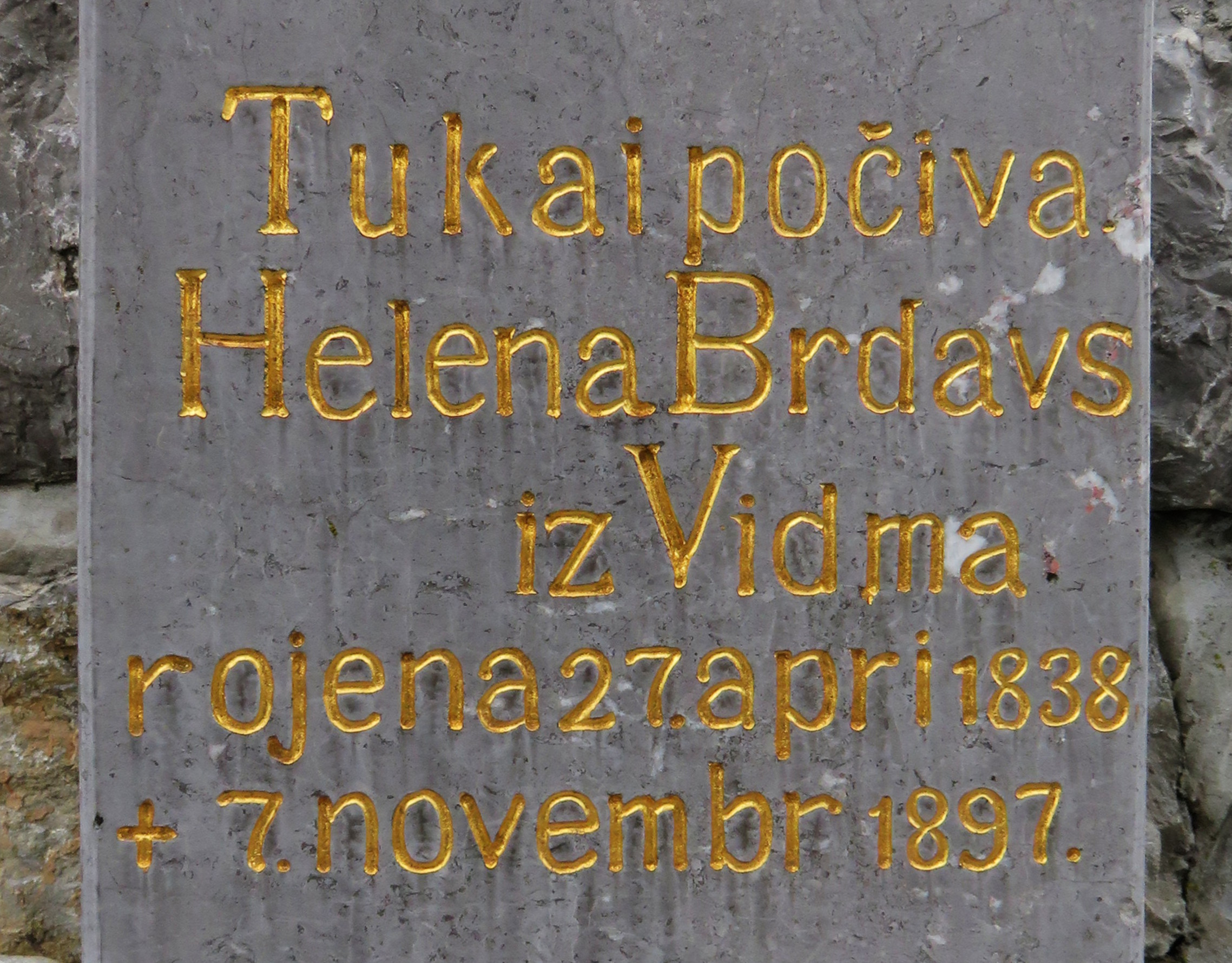
Old gravestone with the toponym Videm

The name Videm comes from the Slovene common noun videm 'church property', borrowed from Middle High German videme 'church property' (originally, 'property left by the deceased to the church').

== History ==
Schooling was begun in Videm in 1809, when a schoolhouse was also built. Videm ceased to exist as a separate settlement in 1953, when it and the former village of Gmajna were merged into a single settlement named Krka.

== Church ==
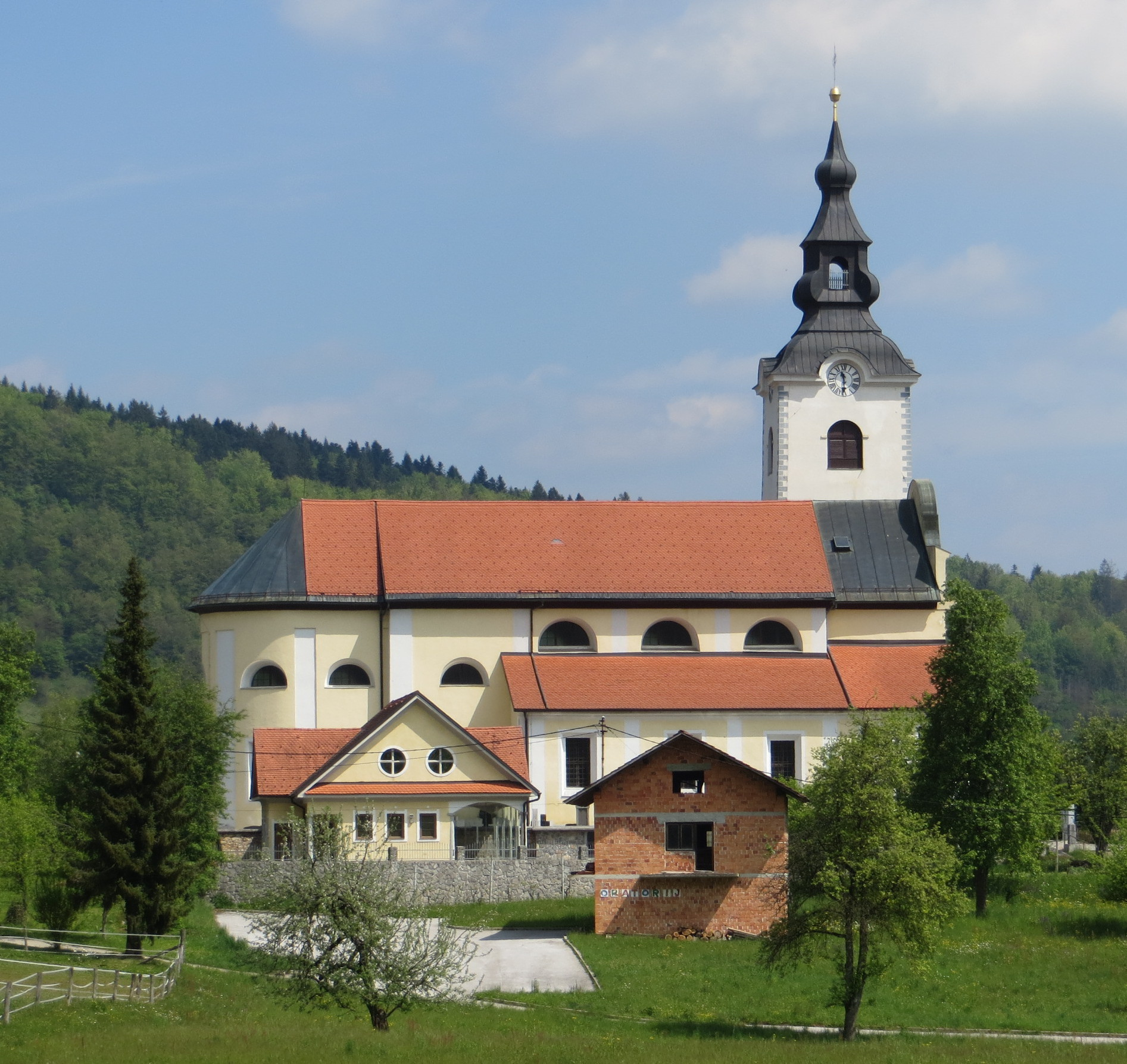
Saints Cosmas and Damian Church

The local parish church is dedicated to Saints Cosmas and Damian and belongs to the Roman Catholic Diocese of Novo Mesto. It dates to the 12th century with numerous alterations over the centuries.

== Notable people ==
Notable people that were born or lived in Videm include:

- Josip Jurčič (1844–1881), writer, attended school in Videm
- August Musić (a.k.a. Avgust Mušič, 1856–1938), linguist, philologist, and lexicographer
