= Ernest Pogorelc =

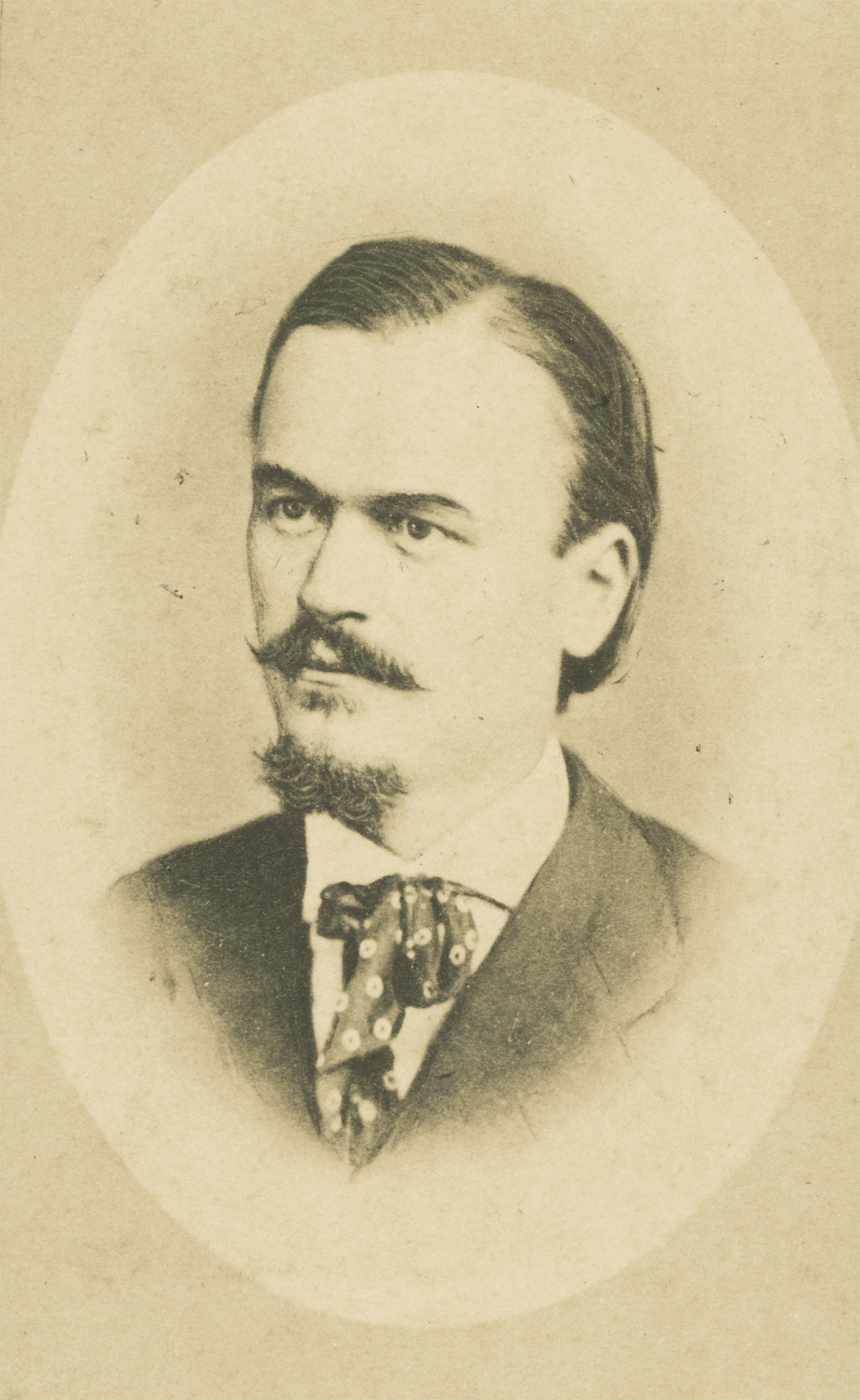
Pogorelc's photograph of the writer Josip Jurčič

Ernest Pogorelc (also Ernst Pogorelz, 1838 – 21 September 1892) was the first professional photographer from Ljubljana.

Pogorelc was of Slovene and Gottschee descent from the Lower Carniola Region, now part of Slovenia. He was born in Dolenja Vas, Ribnica. He was a prolific studio photographer during the 19th century. His work appears in the trade registry in 1859. Expanding in 1864, he acquired an additional studio maintaining one on Vienna Street (Slovene: Dunajska cesta) and one on Railway Station Street (Kolodvorska cesta) Ljubljana. In 1887, he relocated to Zagreb and continued his work there. He died in Ljubljana.
