= Gabrovčec =

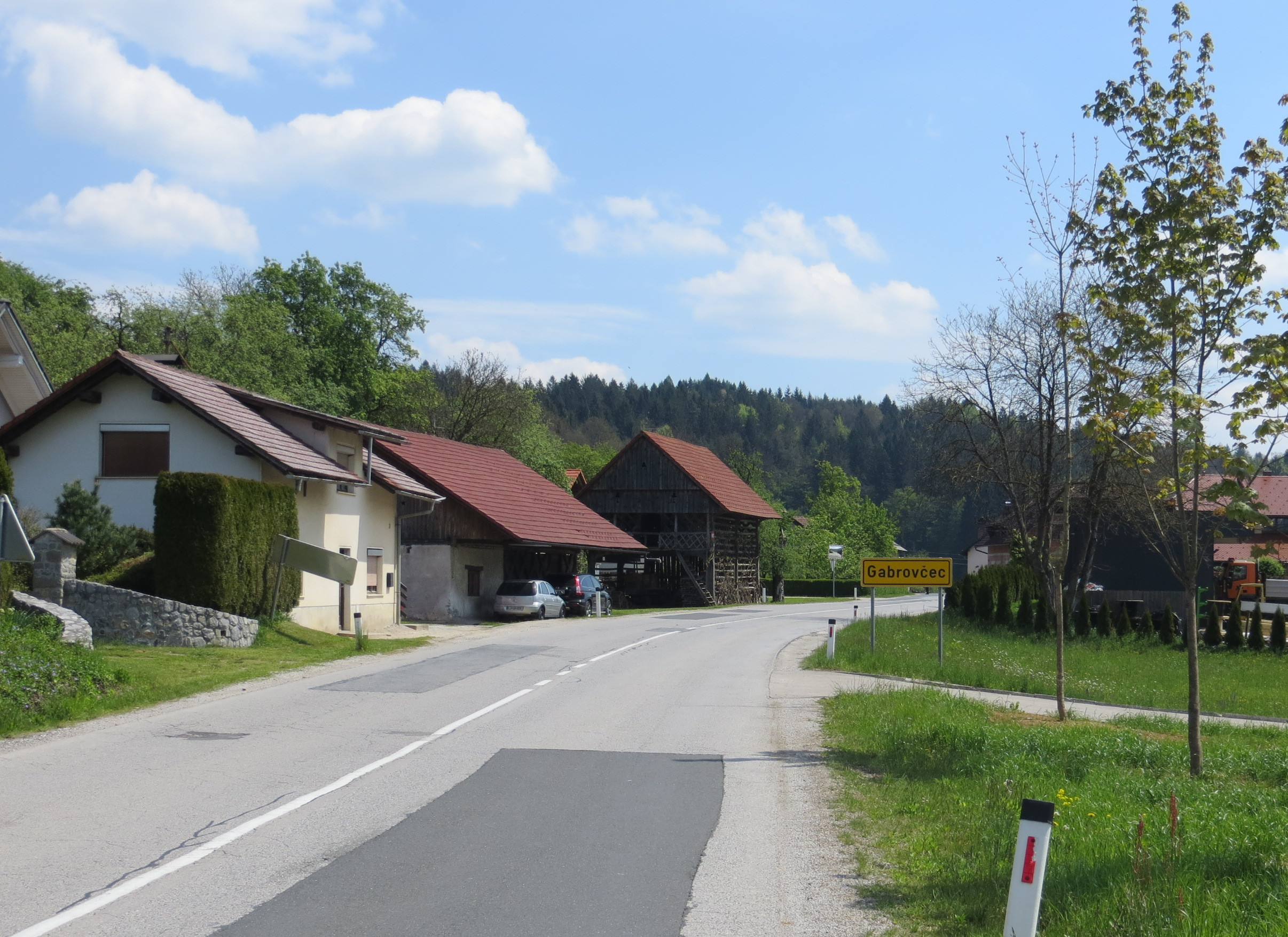

- Location in Slovenia
- Coordinates: 45°52′55.37″N 14°47′49.52″E
- Country: Slovenia
- Traditional region: Lower Carniola
- Statistical region: Central Slovenia
- Municipality: Ivančna Gorica

Area
  - Total: 2.06 km^{2} (0.80 sq mi)
- Elevation: 279 m (915 ft)

Population (2002)
  - Total: 170

Gabrovčec (pronounced [ˈɡaːbɾɔu̯tʃəts]; in older sources also Gabrovščica, German: Gabrowschitz) is a settlement on the right bank of the Krka River in the Municipality of Ivančna Gorica in central Slovenia. The area is part of the historical region of Lower Carniola. The municipality is now included in the Central Slovenia Statistical Region.

A small roadside chapel-shrine in the settlement is dedicated to Saint Anthony of Padua and was built in the early 20th century.
