= Videm pri Temenici =

Videm pri Temenici Videm (until 1953)
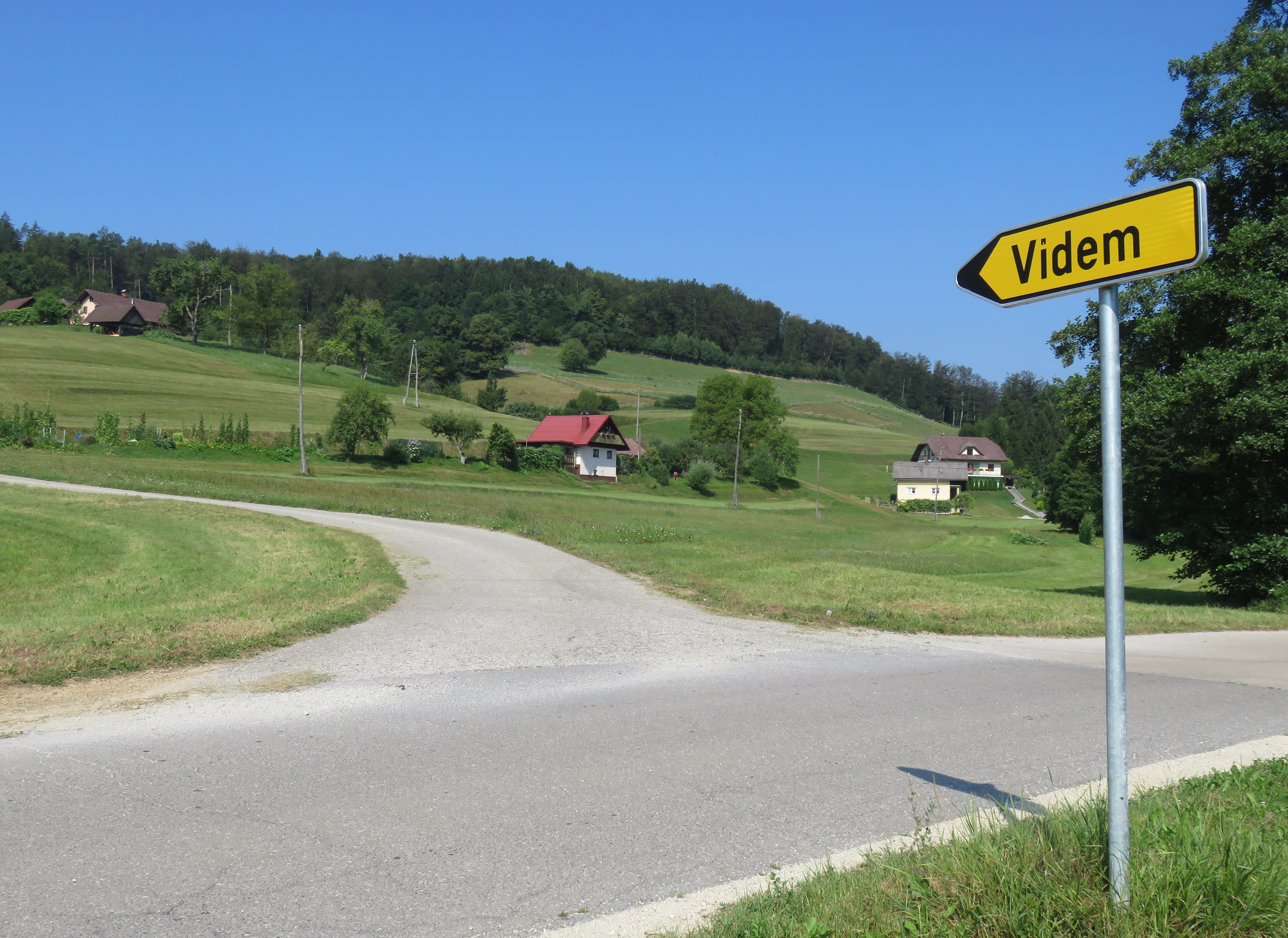

- Location in Slovenia
- Coordinates: 45°58′14.47″N 14°52′27.05″E
- Country: Slovenia
- Traditional region: Lower Carniola
- Statistical region: Central Slovenia
- Municipality: Ivančna Gorica

Area
  - Total: 0.33 km^{2} (0.13 sq mi)
- Elevation: 352.3 m (1,156 ft)

Population (2002)
  - Total: 8

Videm pri Temenici (pronounced [ˈʋiːdəm pɾi ˈteːmɛnitsi]) is a small settlement in the Municipality of Ivančna Gorica in central Slovenia. It lies above the valley of the Temenica River in the historical region of Lower Carniola. The municipality is now included in the Central Slovenia Statistical Region.

== Name ==
The name of the settlement was changed from Videm to Videm pri Temenici (literally, 'Videm near Temenica') in 1953. The name Videm comes from the Slovene common noun videm 'church property', borrowed from Middle High German videme 'church property' (originally, 'property left by the deceased to the church').
