= Gradiček =

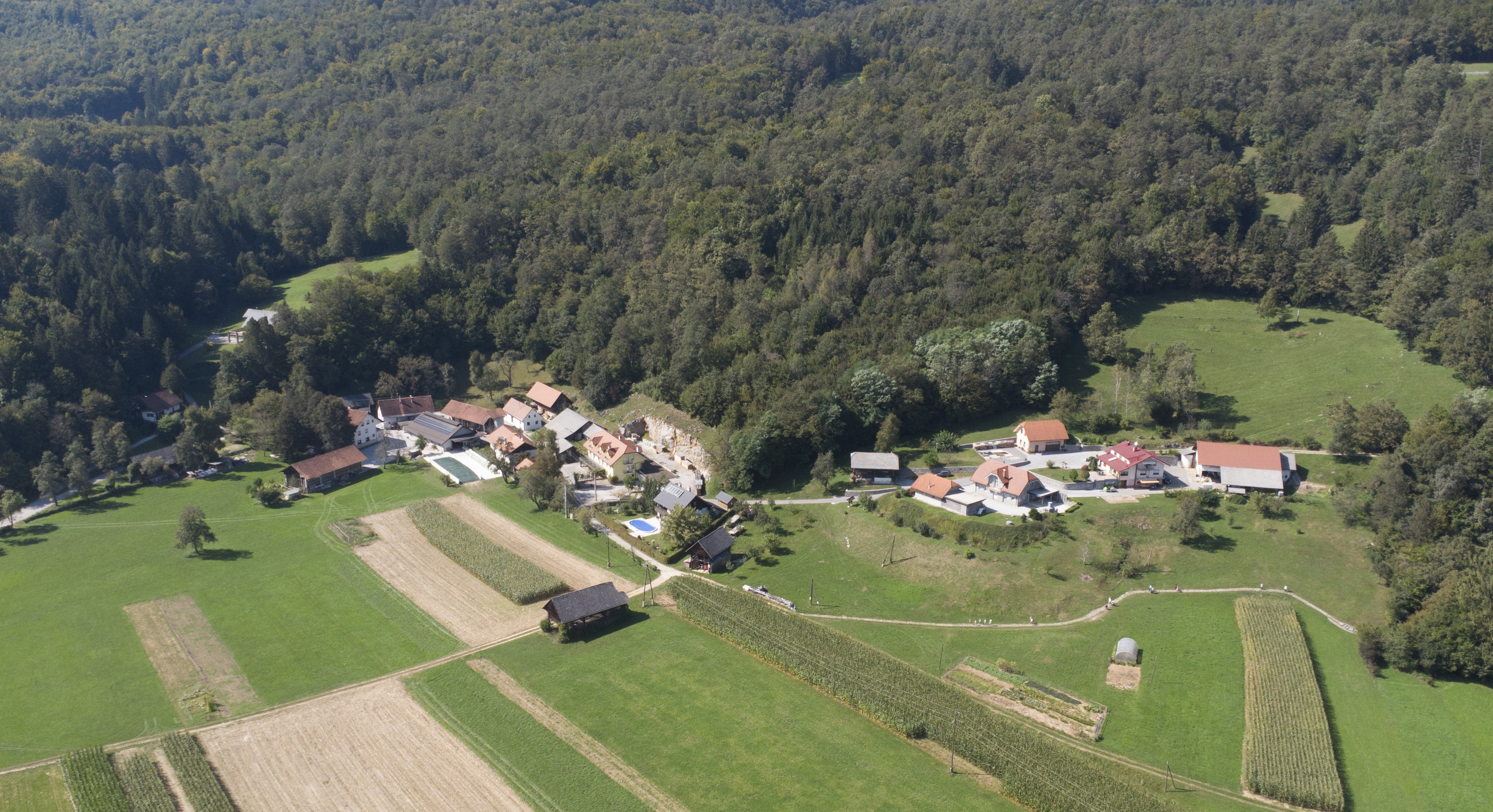

- Location in Slovenia
- Coordinates: 45°53′14.57″N 14°46′4.11″E
- Country: Slovenia
- Traditional region: Lower Carniola
- Statistical region: Central Slovenia
- Municipality: Ivančna Gorica

Area
  - Total: 1.56 km^{2} (0.60 sq mi)
- Elevation: 276.2 m (906 ft)

Population (2002)
  - Total: 25

Gradiček (pronounced [ɡɾaˈdiːtʃək]; German: Pergradu) is a small settlement northwest of Krka in the Municipality of Ivančna Gorica in central Slovenia. The area is part of the historical region of Lower Carniola and is now included in the Central Slovenia Statistical Region.

== Geography ==
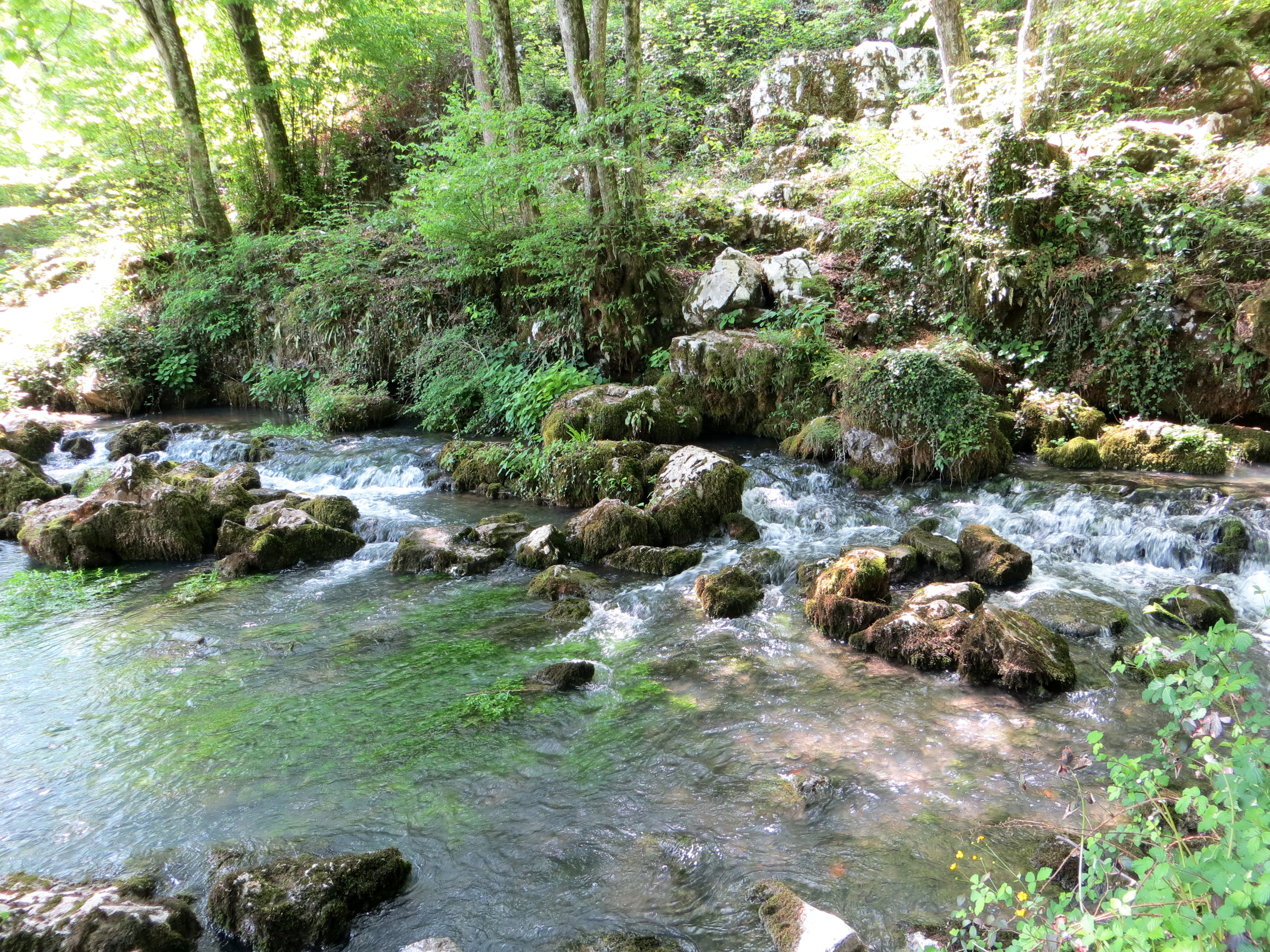
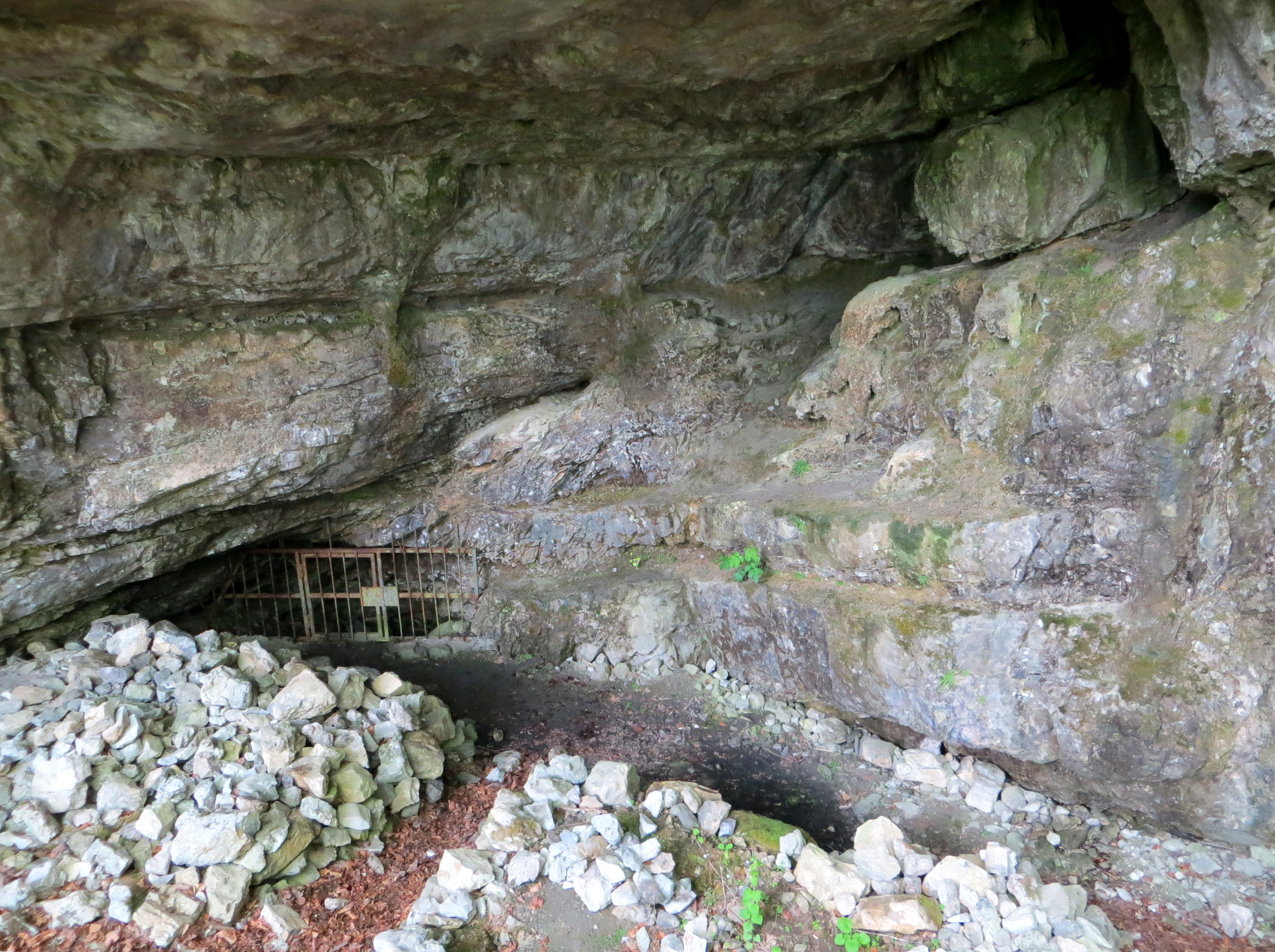
Poltarica Spring (left) and Poltarica Cave (right)

Poltarica Spring—the source of Poltarica Creek, a tributary of the Krka River—lies southwest of the village core. Above the spring is Poltarica Cave, which was discovered in April, 2003. The cave has been explored to a length of 740 meters (2,430 ft) and contains passages, halls, canyons, and siphons. A population of olms lives in the cave, and during high-water conditions there is also a subterranean waterfall in the cave.
