= Vibeke Videm =

Norwegian immunologist

- Born: Bærum, Norway
- Scientific career
- Workplaces: Norwegian University of Science and Technology

Vibeke Videm (born 1957) is a professor of clinical and molecular medicine at the Norwegian University of Science and Technology (NTNU) in Trondheim, Norway, where she specializes in inflammation and immunology. She also is a senior physician at St. Olav's University Hospital.

She received her medical degree from the University of Oslo Faculty of Medicine in 1981. She was a Fulbright Visiting Scholar (2003–2004).

== Publications ==
- Videm's publications in PubMed
