= Trebnja Gorica =

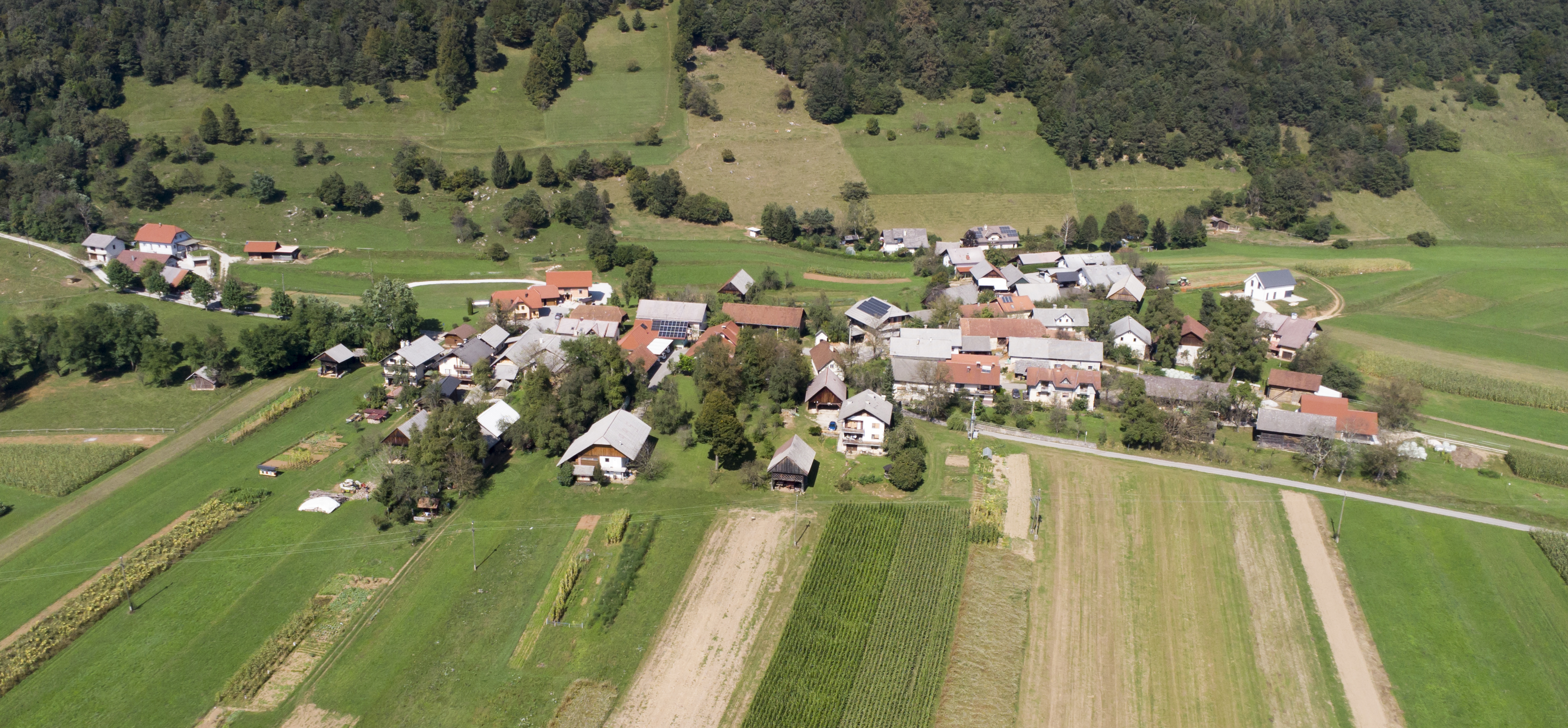

- Location in Slovenia
- Coordinates: 45°53′20.79″N 14°46′34.24″E
- Country: Slovenia
- Traditional region: Lower Carniola
- Statistical region: Central Slovenia
- Municipality: Ivančna Gorica

Area
  - Total: 2.73 km^{2} (1.05 sq mi)
- Elevation: 286.6 m (940 ft)

Population (2002)
  - Total: 77

Trebnja Gorica (pronounced [ˈtɾeːbnja ɡɔˈɾiːtsa]; also called Trebna Gorica in older sources , German: Dreschenbüchel) is a small settlement near the source of the Krka River in the Municipality of Ivančna Gorica in central Slovenia. The area is part of the historical region of Lower Carniola. The municipality is now included in the Central Slovenia Statistical Region.

== Geography ==
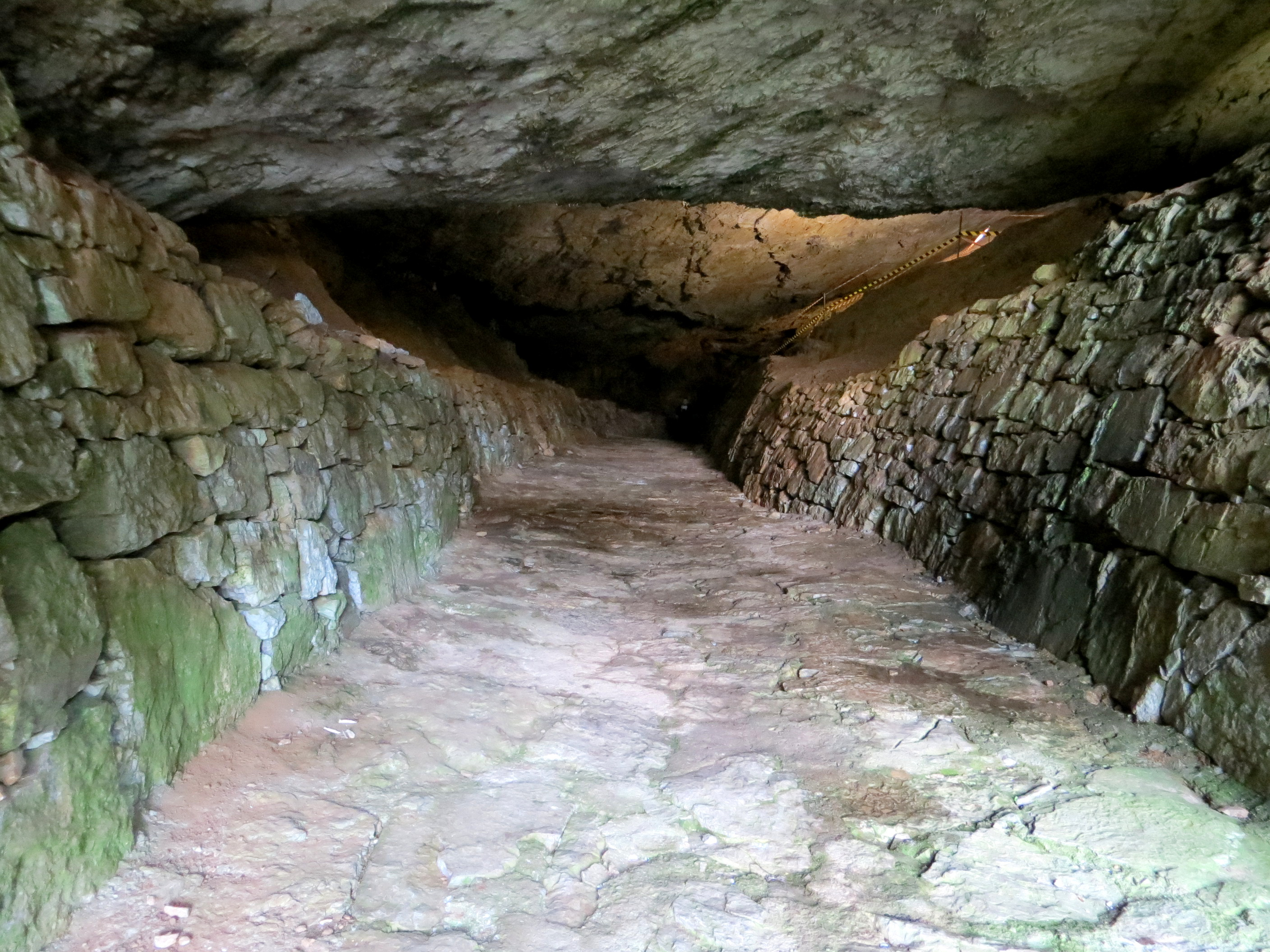
Entrance to Krka Cave in Trebnja Gorica

The entrance to Krka Cave lies northwest of the village.

Water boatman (Micronecta poweri) specimens have been discovered near the village, in Višnjica Creek.
