= Mali Videm =

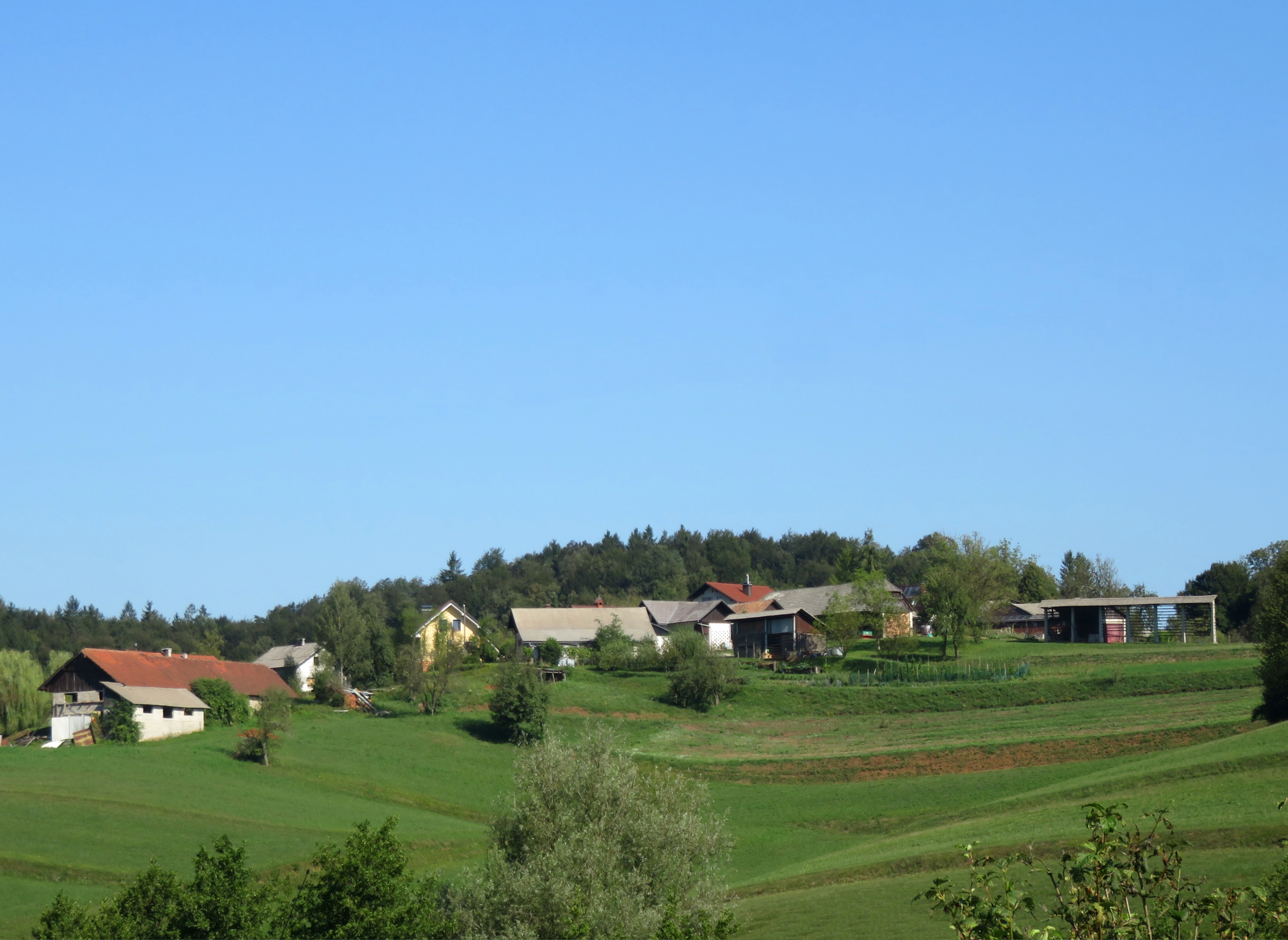

- Location in Slovenia
- Coordinates: 45°56′35.56″N 14°57′2.14″E
- Country: Slovenia
- Traditional region: Lower Carniola
- Statistical region: Southeast Slovenia
- Municipality: Trebnje

Area
  - Total: 0.54 km^{2} (0.21 sq mi)
- Elevation: 326.6 m (1,072 ft)

Population (2002)
  - Total: 32

Mali Videm (pronounced [ˈmaːli ˈʋiːdəm]) is a small settlement east of Šentlovrenc in the Municipality of Trebnje in Slovenia. The area is part of the historical region of Lower Carniola and is now included in the Southeast Slovenia Statistical Region.
