= Videm pri Lukovici =

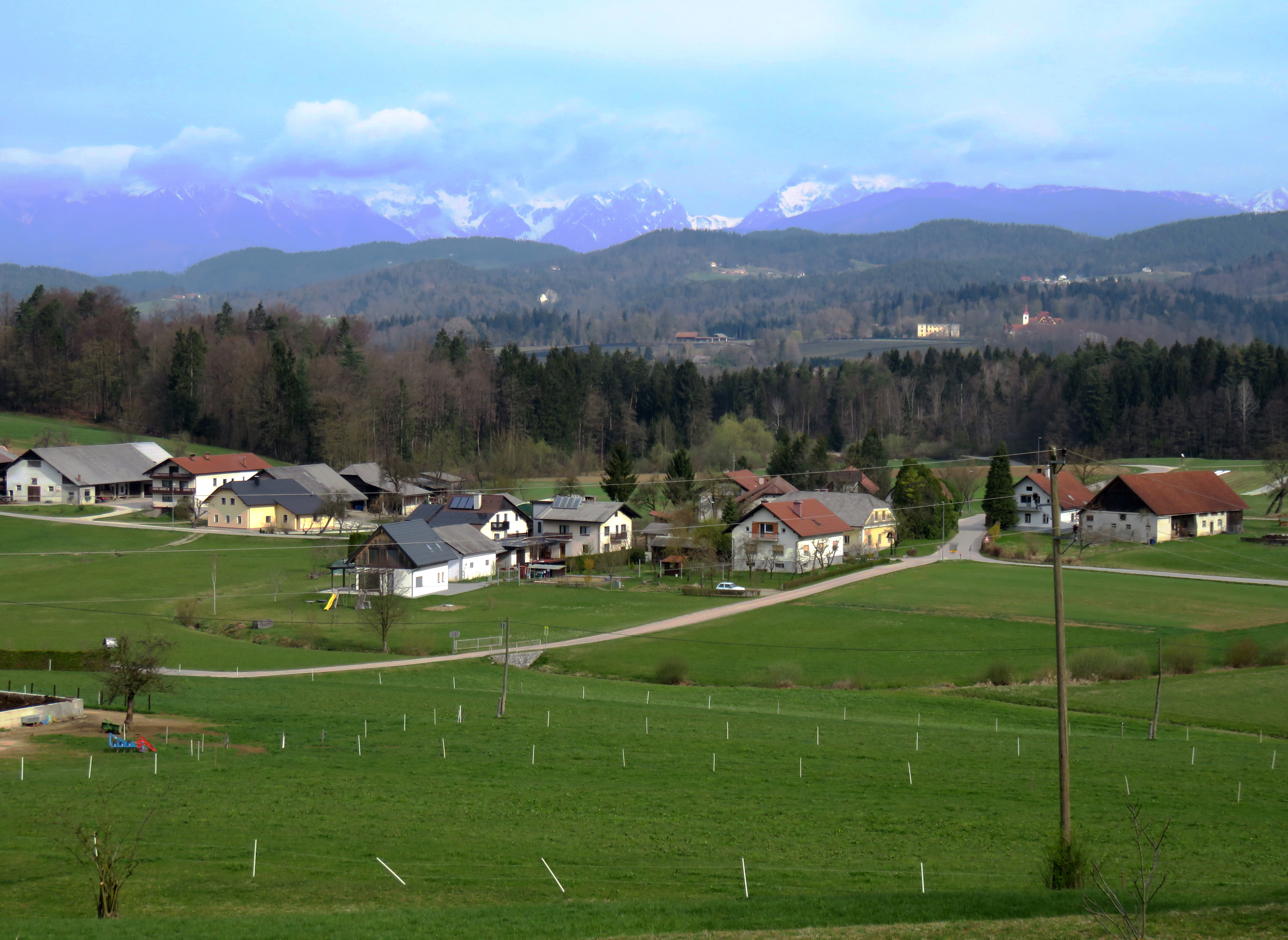

- Location in Slovenia
- Coordinates: 46°9′8.32″N 14°41′18.17″E
- Country: Slovenia
- Traditional region: Upper Carniola
- Statistical region: Central Slovenia
- Municipality: Lukovica

Area
  - Total: 0.59 km^{2} (0.23 sq mi)
- Elevation: 326.4 m (1,071 ft)

Population (2002)
  - Total: 42

Videm pri Lukovici (pronounced [ˈʋiːdəm pɾi ˈluːkɔʋitsi]) is a small settlement south of Lukovica pri Domžalah in the eastern part of the Upper Carniola region of Slovenia.

== Name ==
The name Videm comes from the Slovene common noun videm 'church property', borrowed from Middle High German videme 'church property' (originally, 'property left by the deceased to the church'). The name of the settlement was changed from Videm to Videm pri Lukovici (literally, 'Videm near Lukovica') in 1953.
