= Krka, Ivančna Gorica =

Krka
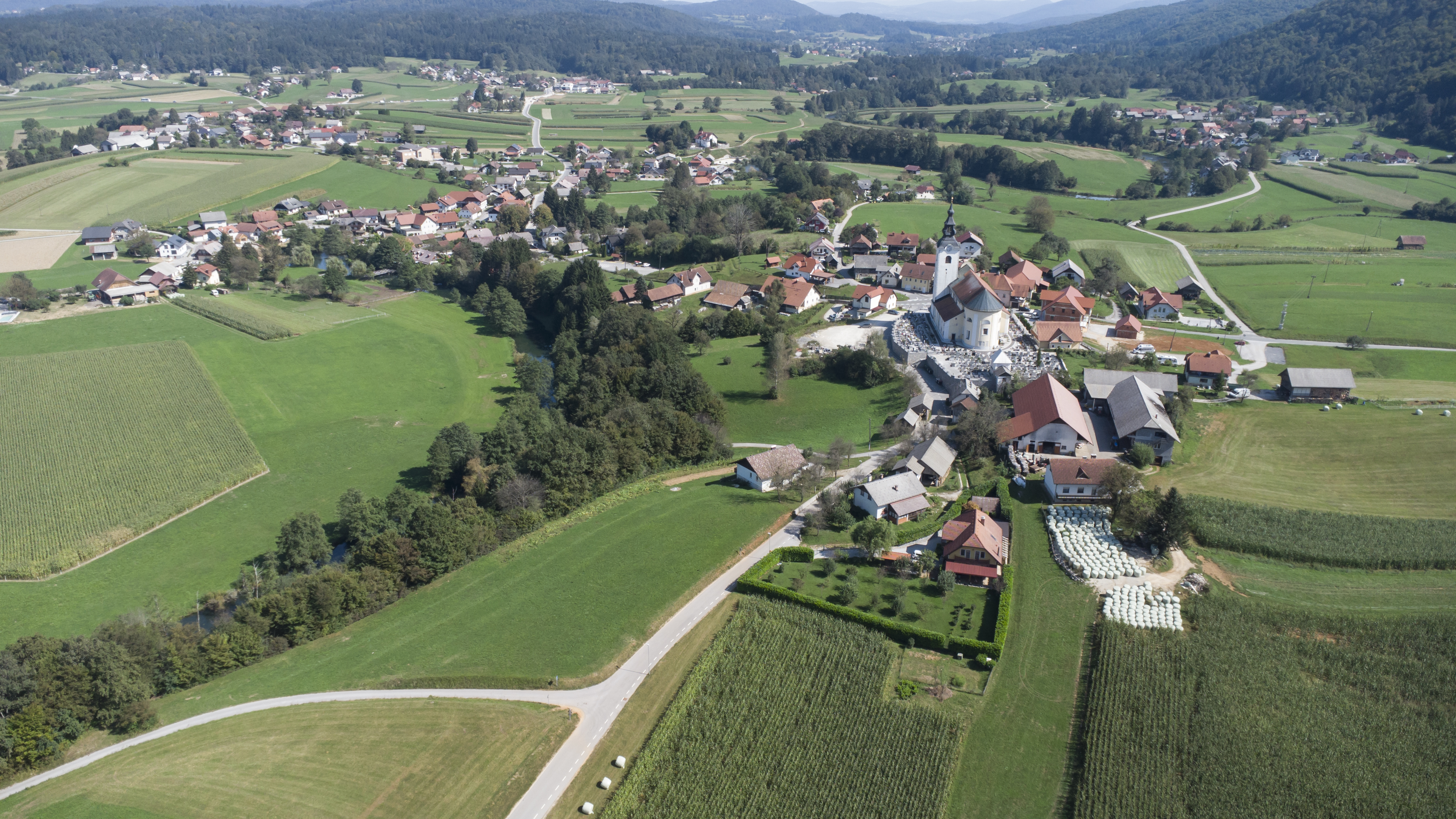

- Location in Slovenia
- Coordinates: 45°52′52.62″N 14°46′41.77″E
- Country: Slovenia
- Traditional region: Lower Carniola
- Statistical region: Central Slovenia
- Municipality: Ivančna Gorica

Area
  - Total: 1.55 km^{2} (0.60 sq mi)
- Elevation: 285.5 m (937 ft)

Population (2002)
  - Total: 230

Krka (pronounced [ˈkəɾːka]) is a settlement in the Municipality of Ivančna Gorica in central Slovenia. It lies near the source of the Krka River, from which it gets its name. The area is part of the historical region of Lower Carniola. The municipality is now included in the Central Slovenia Statistical Region.

== History ==
The settlement of Krka was created in 1953, when the former villages of Videm and Gmajna were merged into a single settlement.

== Church ==
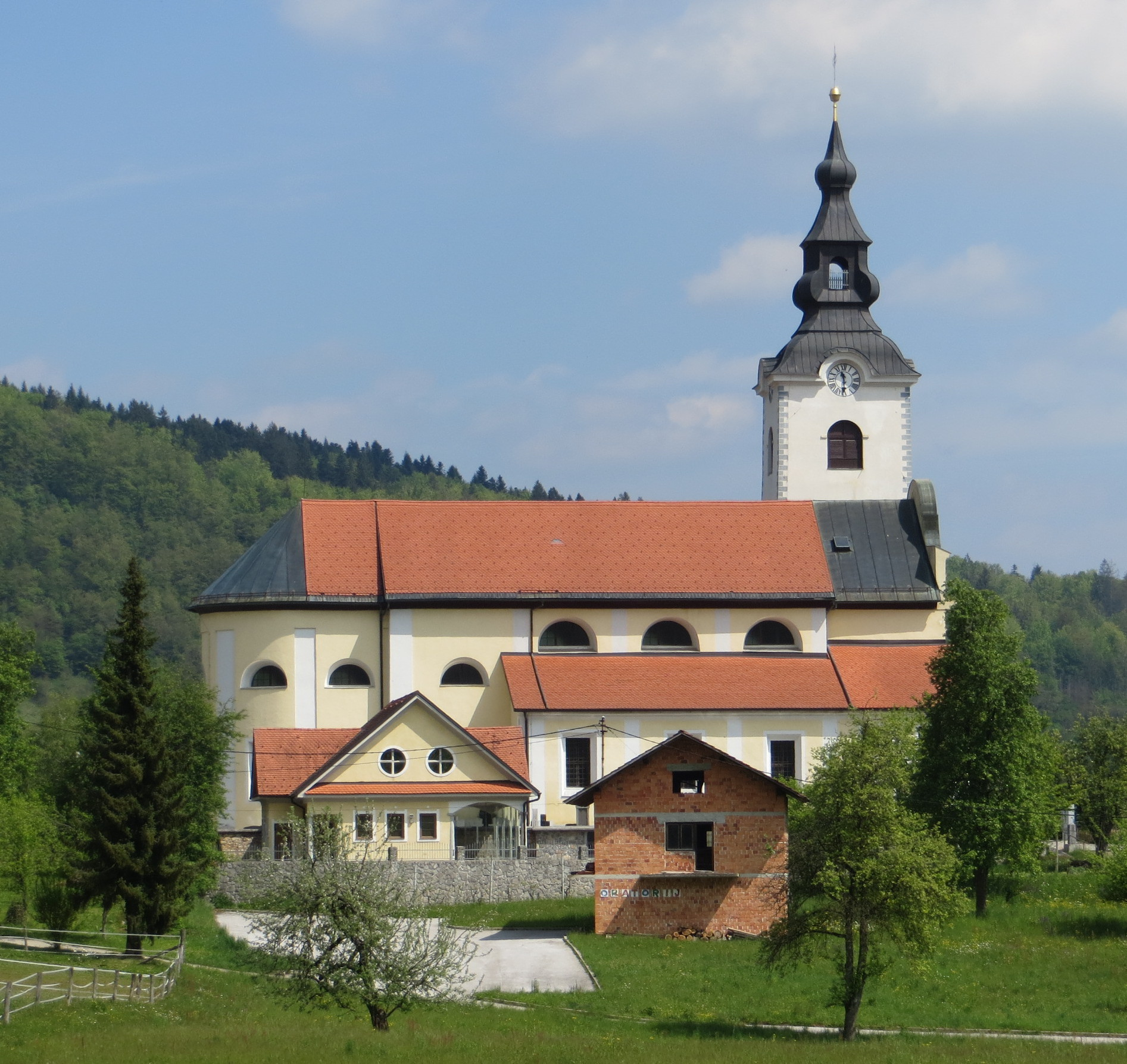
View from the south

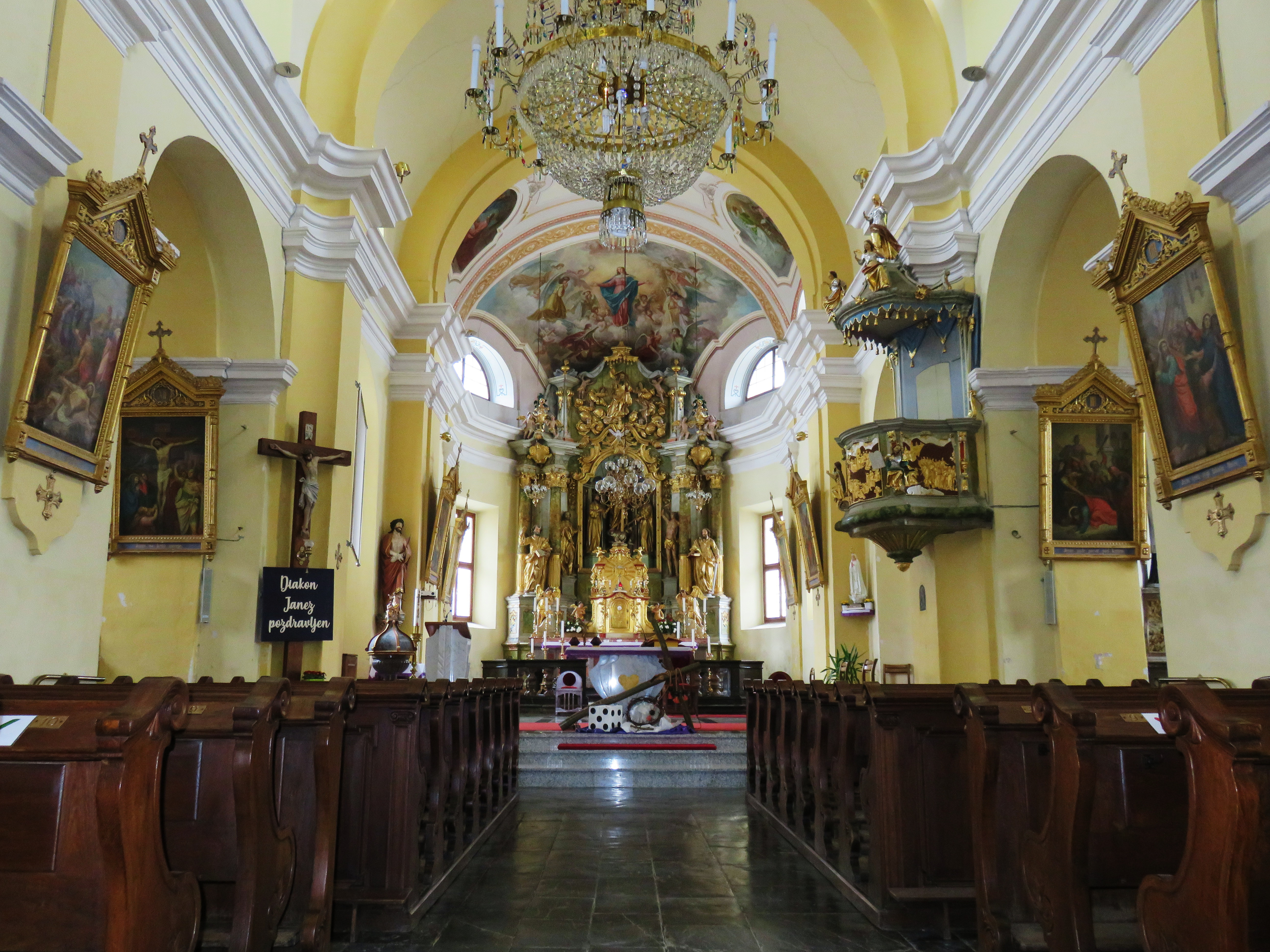
Church interior

Saints Cosmas and Damian Church

The local parish church is dedicated to Saints Cosmas and Damian and belongs to the Roman Catholic Diocese of Novo Mesto. It dates to the 12th century with numerous alterations over the centuries.
