= Intercity passenger transport (LPP) =

LPP, medkrajevni potniški promet, d.o.o.
- Company type: družba z omejeno odgovornostjo
- Industry: transport
- Founded: 2012
- Headquarters: Ljubljana, Klagenfurt Street (Celovška cesta) 160, 1000 Ljubljana, Slovenia
- Products: intercity and tourist transport
- Website: Medkrajevni potniski promet

Intercity passenger transport (Slovene: Medkrajevni potniški promet) is a part of Public Company Ljubljana Passenger Transport (LPP), which provides intercity and tourist passenger transport. Between 2009 and 2012 the service was excluded from LPP and operated under the name of BUS as its subsidiary. Before, intercity bus service was excluded from LPP and it operated under the name of suburban passenger transport.

Since 2013, Urbana is used to pay for services on intercity buses.

== Table of regular bus routes ==
No.	route	Workday	Saturday	Sunday and Holidays	routeing of line
40	Ig AP – Iška Loka – Tomišelj – Strahomer – Iška vas Ig AP > Iška Loka > Tomišelj > Strahomer > Iška > Iška vas > Ig > Brest > Iška Loka > Ig AP	4.20–22.43; 6.15–7.05	4.30–21.02 –	– –	40 na OpenStreetMap; 40 (school) on OpenStreetMap
42	Ig AP – Visoko – Zapotok vas	4.25–22.55	4.50–20.18	–	42 on OpenStreetMap
43; 44	Notranje Gorice – Podpeč – Preserje; Notranje Gorice – Podpeč – Preserje – Rakitna	5.22–22.46; 4.28–22.59	6.55–13.42; 5.15–15.45	– –	43 on OpenStreetMap; 44 on OpenStreetMap
45	Ljubljana – Notranje Gorice – Preserje – Borovnica	5.45–15.30	–		45 on OpenStreetMap
46	Vrhnika Jazon > Borovnica > Preserje > Notranje Gorice > Ljubljana	14.10	–		46 on OpenStreetMap
47	Ljubljana – Brezovica – Drenov Grič – Vrhnika Voljčeva	4.52–23.00	4.50–23.00	5.00–22.20	47 on OpenStreetMap
48	Ljubljana – Vrhnika – Logatec – Kalce – Grčarevec; Grčarevec > Kalce > Logatec > Vrhnika > highway > Ljubljana	4.35–22.20; 5.40–7.05	5.25–15.00 to Kalce only –	– –	48 on OpenStreetMap; 48 (highway) on OpenStreetMap
49	Vrhnika Jazon – Bistra – Borovnica – Breg/Borovnici	5.00–16.23	–		49 on OpenStreetMap
-	Vrhnika Jazon – Horjul	5.15–16.00	–		Vrhnika – Horjul on OpenStreetMap
-	Vrhnika Jazon – Podlipa – Smrečje	5.10–16.05	–		Vrhnika – Smrečje on OpenStreetMap
54	Ljubljana – Brezovica – Plešivica – Blatna Brezovica	6.00–15.45	–		54 on OpenStreetMap
64*	Ljubljana – Mengeš – Komenda – Letališče Brnik	5.00–20.10	6.10–20.00		64 on OpenStreetMap
68; 69	Ljubljana – Grosuplje – Ivančna Gorica – Šentvid/Stični; Ljubljana – Grosuplje – Ivančna Gorica – Šentvid/Stični – Temenica	4.39–22.20; 5.22–14.30	5.40–15.00 –	– –	68 on OpenStreetMap; 69 on OpenStreetMap
71	Grosuplje > Luče na Šoli > Grosuplje	12.00	–		71 on OpenStreetMap
72	Grosuplje – Peč – Polica	5.40–15.50	–		72 on OpenStreetMap
73	Grosuplje – (Sp. Slivnica) – Št. Jurij – Škocjan/Turjaku	5.05–16.10	–		73 on OpenStreetMap
75	Grosuplje – Sp.Slivnica	5.05–15.10	–		75 on OpenStreetMap
76	Ivančna Gorica – Stična – Zagradec – Ambrus; Ambrus > Bakrc > Ambrus; Valična vas – Breg pri Zagradcu – Ivančna Gorica ŠC	5.10–14.10; S: 14.48; S: 7.25–13.40	– – –		76 on OpenStreetMap; 76 (Bakrc) on OpenStreetMap; 76 (school) on OpenStreetMap
77	Ambrus – Krka – Ivančna Gorica ŠC	S: 7.35–12.55	–		77 on OpenStreetMap
78	Ljubljana – Grosuplje – Videm; Brezje/Dobrepolju – Videm – Hočevje – Ivančna Gorica ŠC	4.30–22.30; S: 6.20–14.15	5.28 & 14.10 –	– –	78 on OpenStreetMap; 78 (school) on OpenStreetMap
79	Videm – Turjak – Škofljica – Ljubljana	15.05	–		79 on OpenStreetMap
82	Ljubljana – Škofljica – Želimlje	5.00–15.40	–		82 on OpenStreetMap

Legend:

- S -> operates on weekdays during school year
- * -> route 64 is operated by Alpetour and LPP

Regional tags

	region		region		region		region		region
I	Ig	V	Vrhnika	P	Polhov Gradec	B	Brnik	G	Grosuplje

== History ==
Most of bus lines were cancelled after 1997 due to drastic decrease of passengers and unrentability. In last several years the reason behind the cancellation of bus lines was the extension of city bus routes to the suburban areas.

no.	route	period of operation	ground of suspension
	section Iška vas – Iški Vintgar		
40/41/42	section Ljubljana – Ig	29 August 2011	introduction of line no. 19I
42	section Zapotok – Kurešček dom section Zapotok – Rob	1 February 2012	
43/44	section Podpeč – Jezero section Ljubljana – Notranje Gorice	September 2009; 1 February 2012	introduction of line no. 19B extension of line no. 6B
50	Vrhnika Jazon – Bevke	1 March 2011	
	Ljubljana – Vrhnika – Horjul		
58	section Lučine – Suhi Dol		
	Ljubljana – Lj. Tacen – Gameljne; Ljubljana – Lj. Črnuče – Gameljne		introduction of line no. 16
	Ljubljana – Medno – Medvode – Ločnica – Topol		
60	section Vodice – Selo/Vodicah – Vojsko	1 February 2012	
61	Ljubljana – Vikrče – Pirniče – Smlednik – Zapoge – Vodice	1 February 2012	introduction of line no. 15, reroute to line 60 routing
62; 63	Ljubljana – Šmartno – Zapoge – Vodice – Selo/Vodicah; Ljubljana – Šmartno – Zapoge – Vodice – Selo/Vodicah – Vojsko/Vodicah – Šmartno – Ljubljana	3 September 2012	introduction of integrated lines no. 60, 61, 62
	Ljubljana – Medvode – Zapoge – Vodice	2 November 2012	introduction of integrated line no. 30
66	Ljubljana – Tuji Grm		introduction of line no. 29
67	Ljubljana – Podlipoglav – Mali Lipoglav		introduction of line no. 28
	Ljubljana – Velike Lašče – Karlovica – Rob		
	Ljubljana – Grosuplje – Staro Apno – Ponikve/Dobrepolju – (Videm)		
70	Ljubljana – Škofljica – Grosuplje	29 August 2011	introduction of integrated line no. 3G
	Ljubljana – Sneberje – Šentjakob – Dol – Dolsko; Ljubljana – Sneberje – Šentjakob – Dol – Dolsko – Križevska vas	27 April 1989 - ?	
