= Primča Vas =

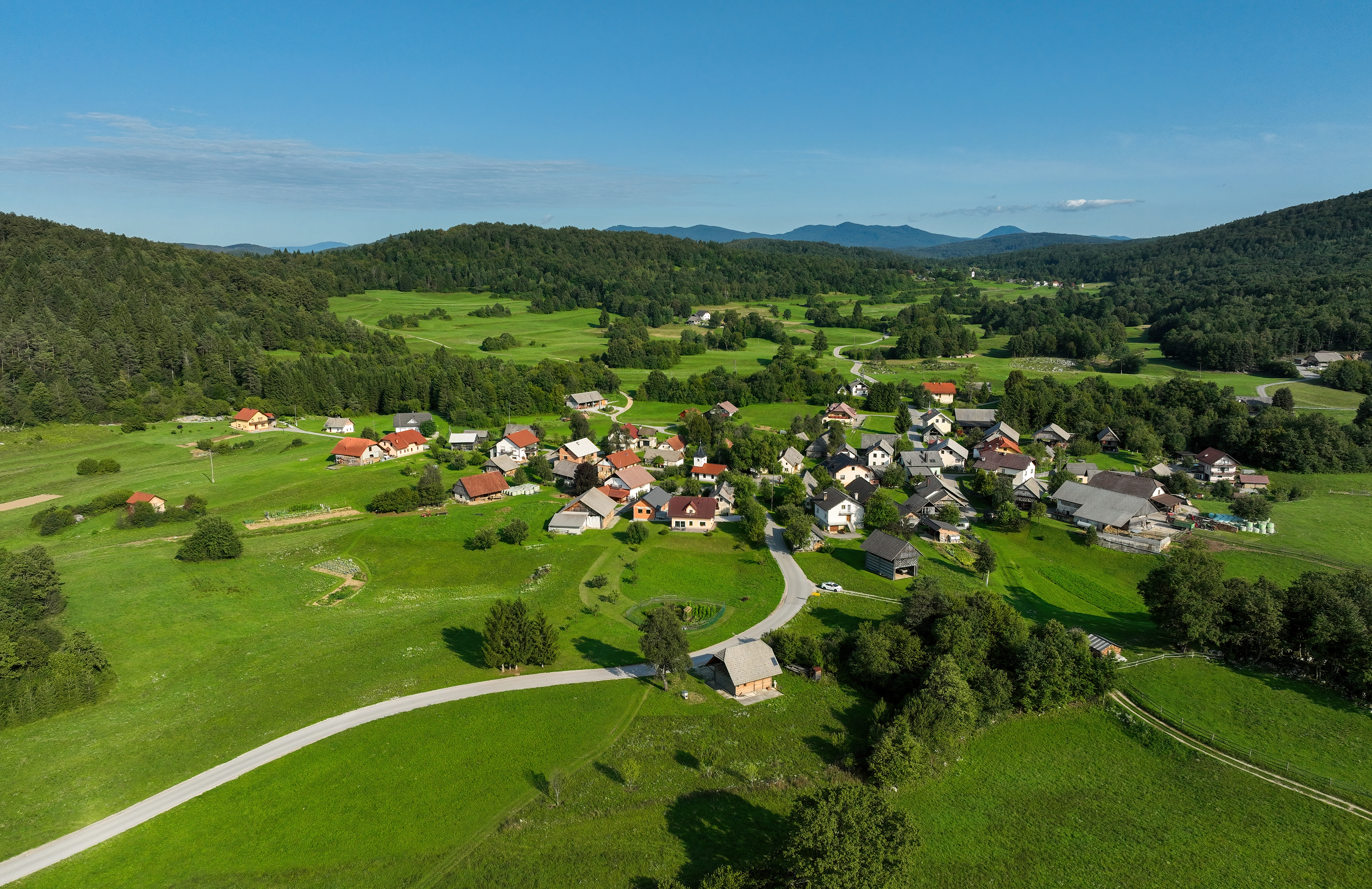

- Location in Slovenia
- Coordinates: 45°49′7.44″N 14°49′18.32″E
- Country: Slovenia
- Traditional region: Lower Carniola
- Statistical region: Central Slovenia
- Municipality: Ivančna Gorica

Area
  - Total: 2.25 km^{2} (0.87 sq mi)
- Elevation: 344.4 m (1,130 ft)

Population (2002)
  - Total: 63

Primča Vas (pronounced [ˈpɾiːmtʃa ˈʋaːs]; Slovene: Primča vas) is a small village south of Ambrus in the Municipality of Ivančna Gorica in central Slovenia. The area is part of the historical region of Lower Carniola. The municipality is now included in the Central Slovenia Statistical Region.

== Church ==
The church in Primča Vas is dedicated to the Holy Family and John the Baptist. Its origins go back to a vow made during the Second World War by a local man, Jože Hočevar, that he would build a roadside chapel-shrine if he survived the war. Although he survived the war, until his death in 1974 he was unable to obtain permission from the communist authorities to build the shrine. After Slovenia gained independence in 1991, Hočevar's family built the church to honor his wish, and it was consecrated by Auxiliary Bishop of Ljubljana Alojz Uran in 1993.
