= Kuželjevec =

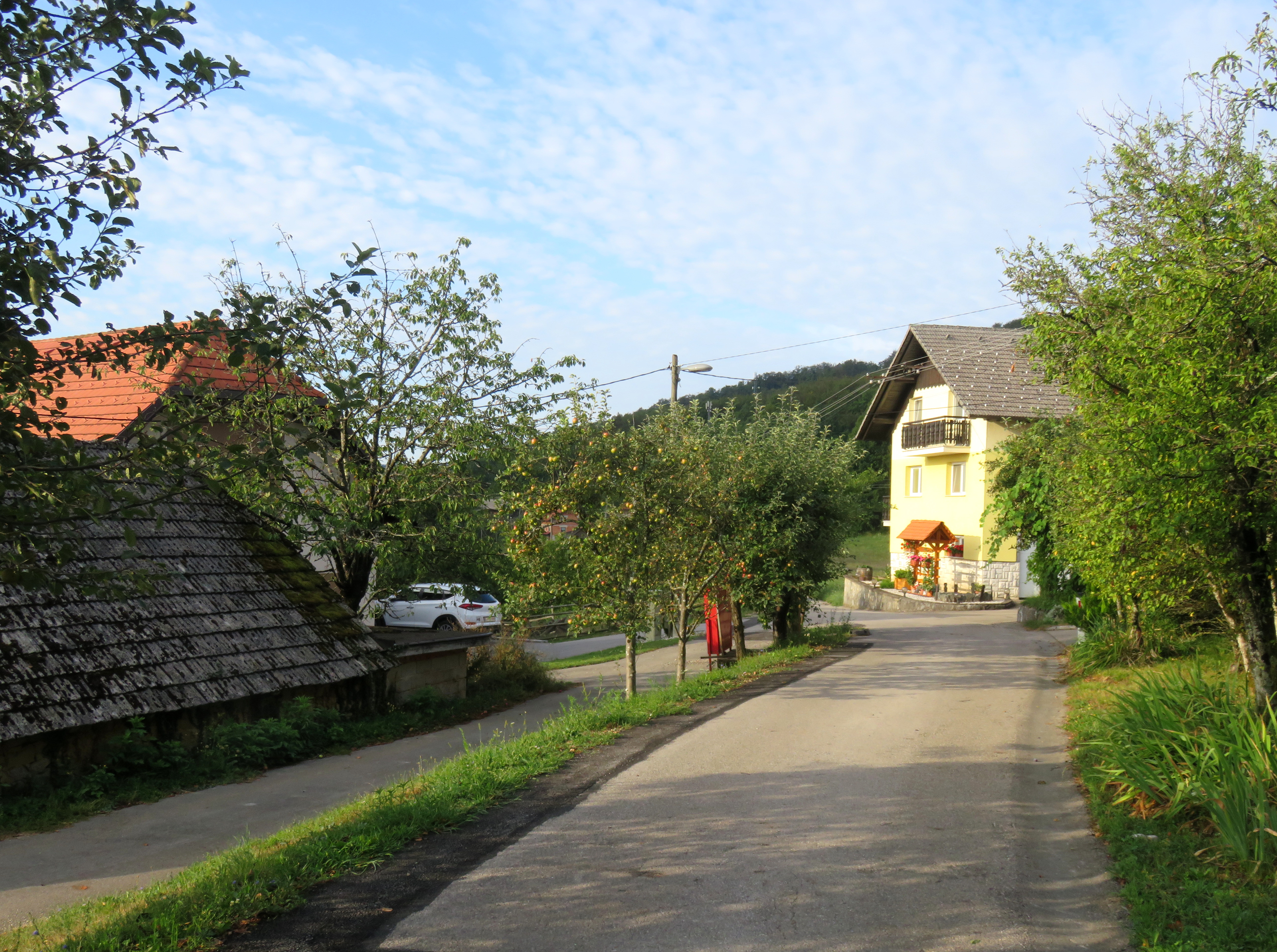

- Location in Slovenia
- Coordinates: 45°51′24.72″N 14°48′36.63″E
- Country: Slovenia
- Traditional region: Lower Carniola
- Statistical region: Central Slovenia
- Municipality: Ivančna Gorica

Area
  - Total: 2.42 km^{2} (0.93 sq mi)
- Elevation: 466.8 m (1,531 ft)

Population (2002)
  - Total: 41

Kuželjevec (pronounced [ˈkuːʒɛljɛʋəts]) is a small settlement in the Municipality of Ivančna Gorica in central Slovenia. It lies in the hills between Ambrus and the right bank of the Krka River in the historical region of Lower Carniola. The municipality is now included in the Central Slovenia Statistical Region.

== Chapel ==
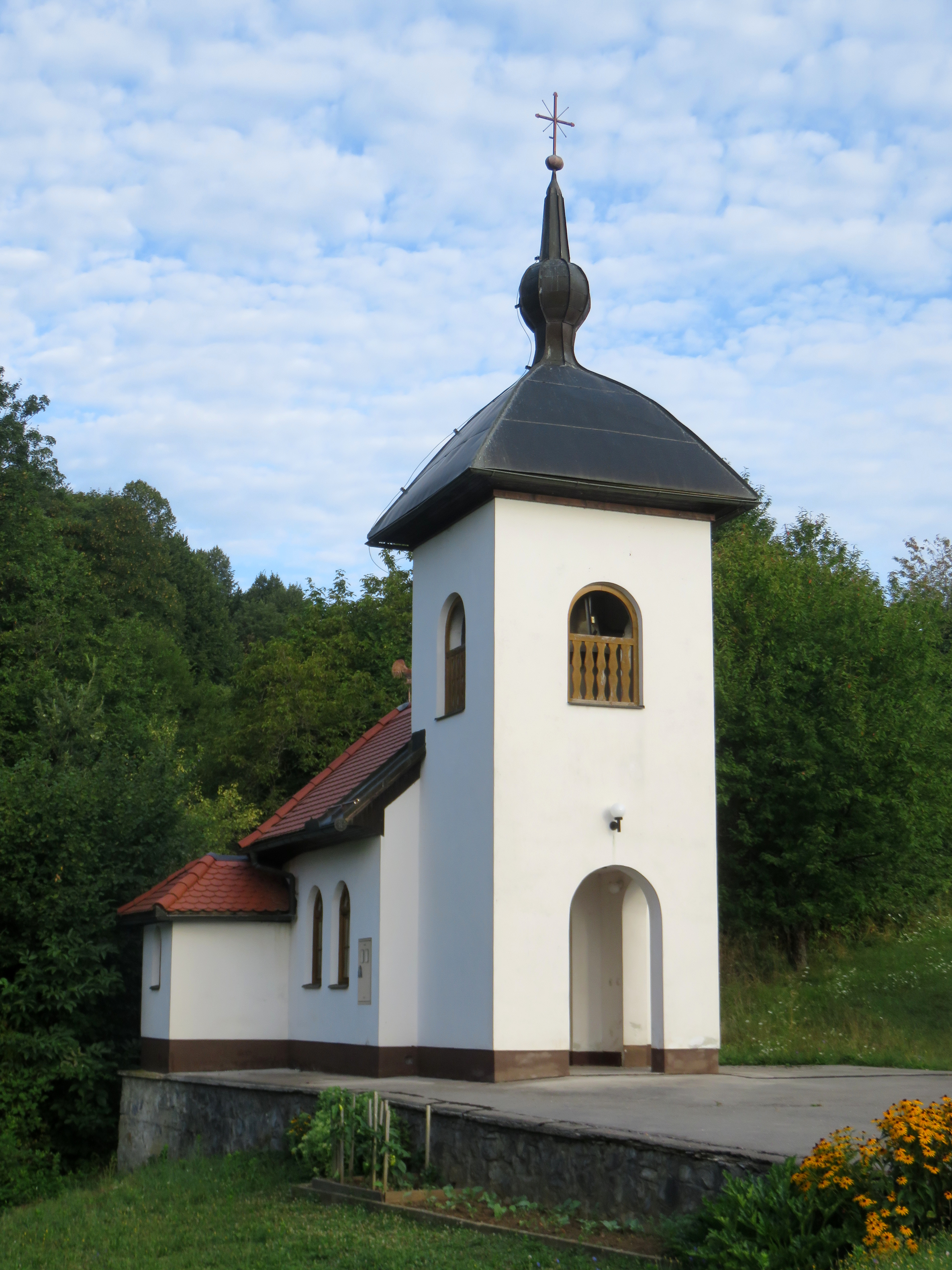
Saint Anthony of Padua Chapel

There is a chapel in Kuželjevec. It is dedicated to Saint Anthony of Padua.
