= Ljubljana Passenger Transport =

Public transport company in Ljubljana, Slovenia

Javno podjetje Ljubljanski potniški promet, d.o.o.

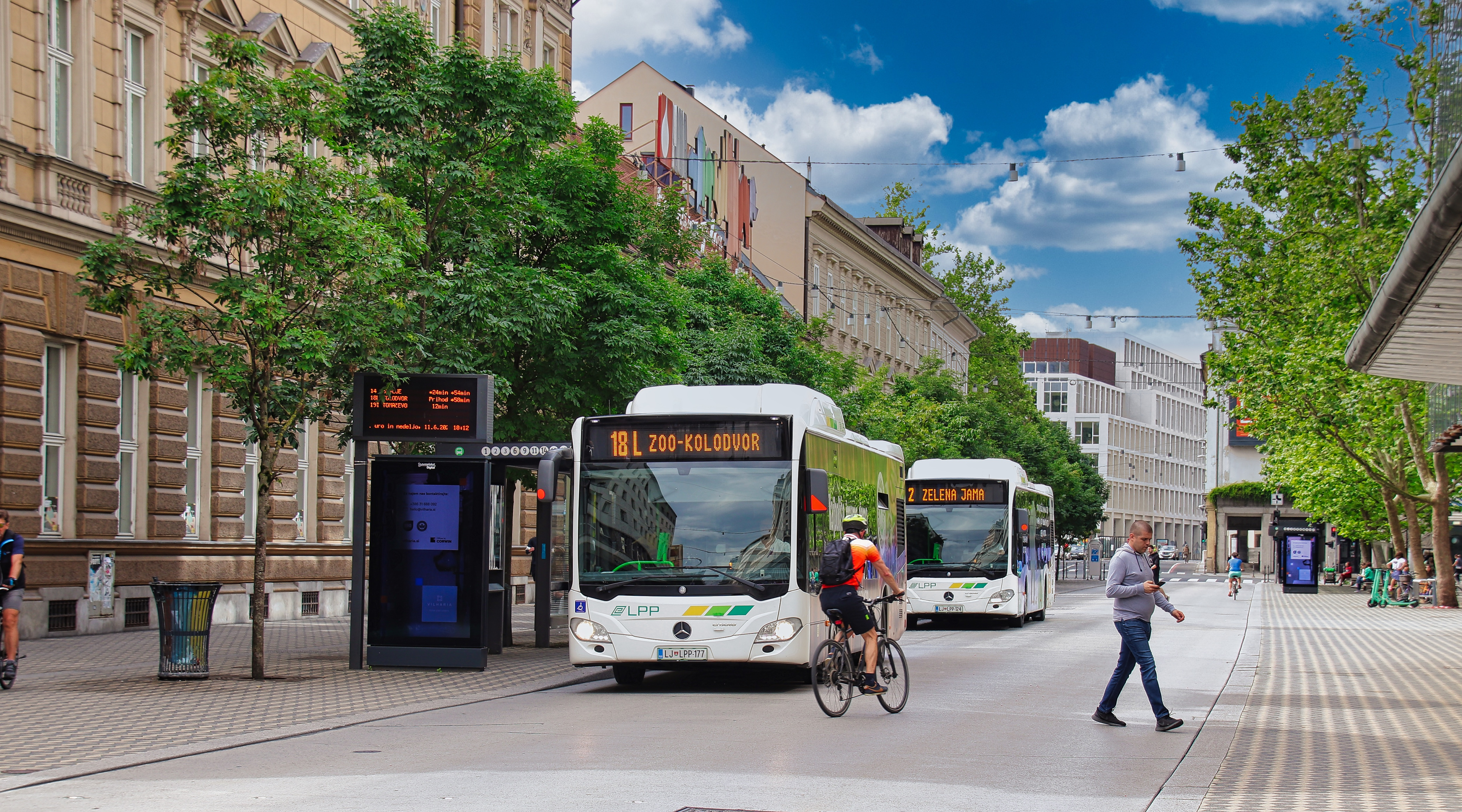
- Founded: 1901
- Headquarters: Ljubljana, Klagenfurt Street (Celovška cesta) 160, 1000 Ljubljana, Slovenia
- Service area: Ljubljana; Medvode; Dol pri Ljubljani; Brezovica; Škofljica; Ig; Vodice
- Service type: Bus service Light rail (planned)
- Routes: 34 (as of December 2021)
- Fleet: 213 (as of December 2018)
- Operator: Public Holding Ljubljana
- Chief executive: Peter Horvat
- Website: www.lpp.si

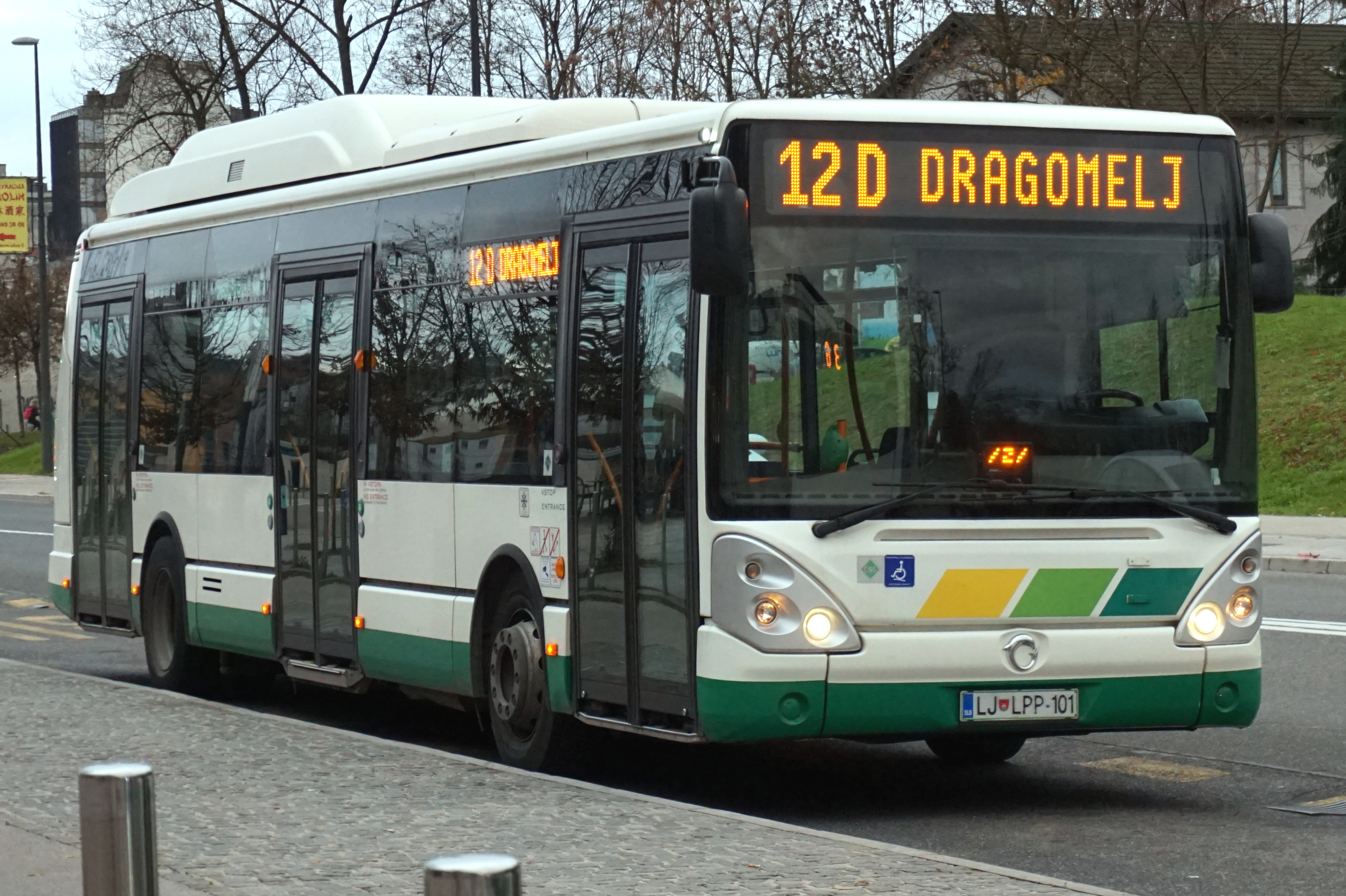
Irisbus Iveco Citelis 12m CNG

The Ljubljana Passenger Transport (Slovene: Ljubljanski potniški promet), also known by the acronym LPP, is a public transport company (company with limited liability) embedded in the company Public Holding Ljubljana (Slovene: Javni holding Ljubljana). It primarily provides urban public bus transport in the city of Ljubljana and also in the city's surroundings through its Intercity Passenger Transport department (Slovene: Medkrajevni potniški promet - MPP). In addition, the company also offers chartered bus service, service and repair of commercial vehicles and parts, technical inspection of vehicles, and vehicle registration.

== Company headquarters ==
The company headquarters with an office building, garage areas, workshops, and a building for technical inspection of motor vehicles are located in a large complex in Zgornja Šiška between Klagenfurt Street (Celovška cesta), Litostroj Street (Litostrojska cesta), and Ljubljana Brigades Street (Cesta Ljubljanskih brigad).

== History ==
=== Tramway era (1901–1958) ===
When Ljubljana had about 40,000 inhabitants, the city authorities decided to impose a "mechanised" means of transport and in 1900 Splošna maloželezniška družba (English: General little railway company) was officially established. Without special ceremony, the tramway officially started to operate on September 6, 1901. On the first day they sold 6,400 tickets.

The company was in fact very small, because only 13 motorised units with 1 trailer and a car used for salting roads in winter were in stock, 64 people were employed. In each tram there was room for 30 people (16 seats and 14 standing), they could reach speeds of up to 30 kilometres per hour. By the end of 1901, the Ljubljana tram travelled about 136,000 kilometres and transported 330,000 passengers. Splošna maloželezniška družba which was managing trams in Ljubljana was an Austrian private limited company under the management of foreign investor company Siemens & Halske. After the expiry of 20 years of operation, the city finally bought the rights of the tramway company.

In 1929, the Splošna maloželezniška družba changed its name to Električna cestna železnica (English: Electric street railway) and since 1930 the city modernised stock and tracks. With purchasing new and used vehicles, the rolling stock by 1940 consisted of 52 units. Tramway lines were connecting city centre with the suburbs. Workshops and garages were moved to the street Celovška cesta in the suburb of Šiška.

=== Trolleybus era (1951–1971) ===
After the Second world war, Ljubljana quickly spread and the tramway could no longer withstand the growing transportation needs in the city. When cars started to spread among general population, it was an additional reason for different arrangements of public transport that would prejudice less street surface in Ljubljana. In May 1953 the Mestni ljudski odbor Ljubljana (English: City people's committee of Ljubljana) set up a commission that prepared a proposal on exchanging tramways with trolleybus and bus service. Altogether, 54 trolleybuses were purchased (vehicle no. 300 to 353).

The transition was gradual, during 1958 first trolleybuses and buses started to regularly operate in Ljubljana, trams stopped driving, the Električna cestna železnica was renamed to Ljubljana-Transport. The last journey of tram was on December 20, 1958. Like tramways, trolleybuses were also electrically powered and therefore were depending on the power lines installed in the city.

Trolleybus lines that operated:

- Line no. 1 Vič – Vižmarje
- Line no. 6 Vič – Ježica
- Line no. 7 Litostroj – Ajdovščina
- Line no. 8 Litostroj – Črnuče

Experience with the operation of trolleybuses was not best. Trolleybus's current collectors often "fell off" and had to be reinstalled each time. During winters, there were additional problems caused by snow and road-sanding with salt. Salted water often came into contact with electrical wiring and caused short circuits. Sometimes the entire body of a trolleybus was energised with electricity. Passengers often experienced shock if they touched metal parts of the vehicle. The last trolleybus vehicle in Ljubljana drove on September 4, 1971, on line no. 1. On the next day, the trolleybus line was completely replaced by buses.

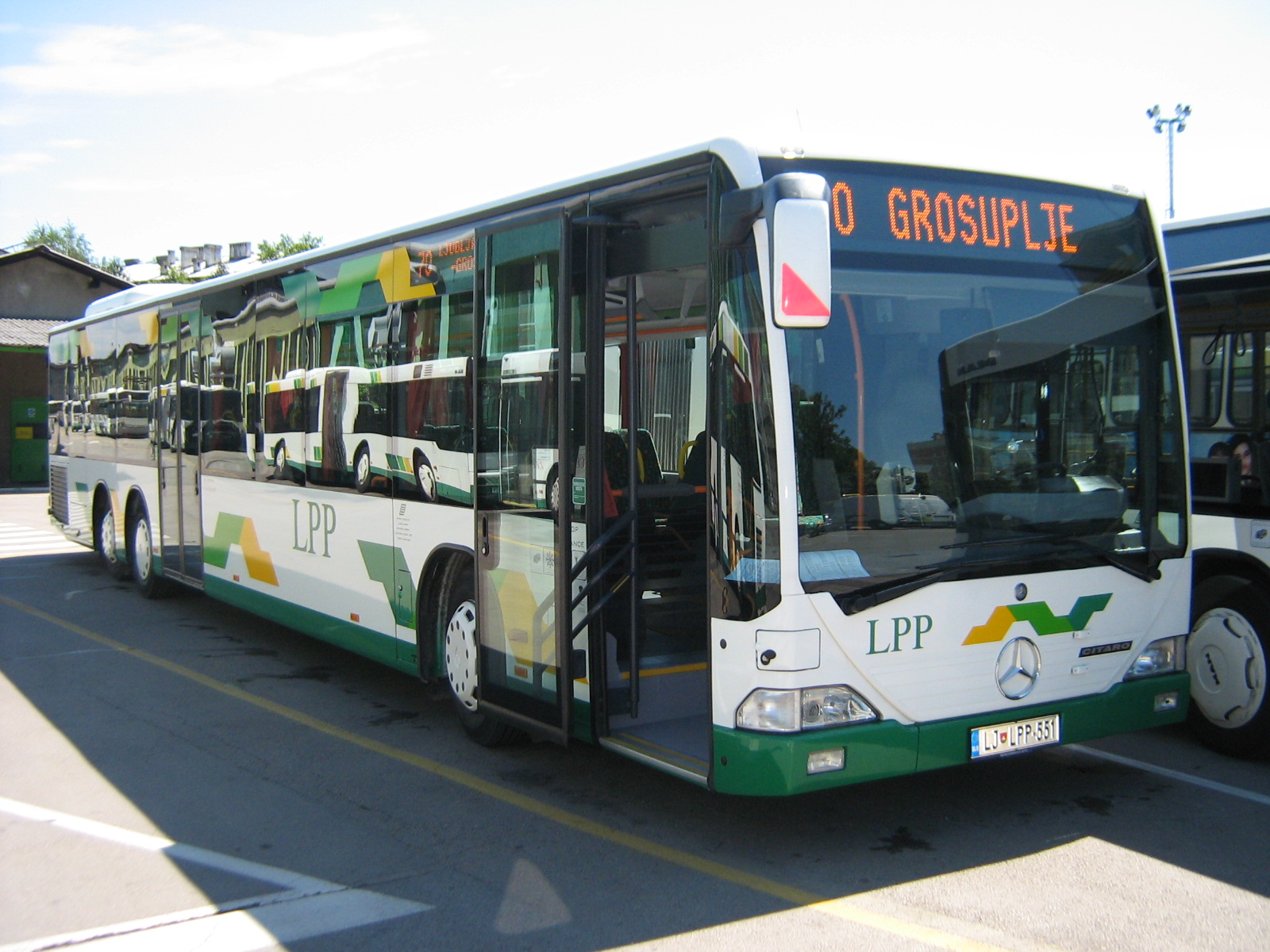
Mercedes-Benz Citaro II (O530)

=== Bus era (1950–today) ===
The 1960s and 1970s brought unimagined development of urban public transport and the company, which was renamed Viator in 1971, gradually expanded its operations throughout Slovenia. Urban transport operations developed into other services such as long-distance passenger transport, freight and tourist traffic, which boosted tourist agencies' activities, and then continued with the construction of lifts to mountains such as Vogel, the Big Pasture Plateau, and Zatrnik. From transport and tourism, it was only one step to catering and taxi services. Since 1971, public transportation was carried out exclusively by buses.

In 1977, Viator formed an alliance with the company SAP into SOZD SAP Viator.

Further mergers and alliances followed between different transport, tourism and hotel organizations throughout Slovenia, and also the Viator found itself on March 25, 1981, in the INTEGRAL SOZD. In this context, today's business's name occurred, Ljubljanski potniški promet (LPP).

In 1989, the LPP has decided to withdraw from the Integral, since there were no more development opportunities for continuing operations of urban public transport to Ljubljana, its people and suburbs and also its visitors. LPP has become a public company serving residents of the capital and its suburban municipalities.

Since 1994 LPP acts as a public, limited liability company, under the Municipality of Ljubljana.

== Fleet ==
As of December 2018 the fleet consisted of 213 vehicles, including 143 articulated buses, 54 single buses and 16 midibuses.

== Payment ==
Since the introduction of the tram, tickets were sold for a single ride. They remained in use until the end of 1974, when they introduced a modernised payment service. Tokens and monthly passes were introduced. Entering the vehicle was possible only at the back door, where there was a conductor, entry through the first door was only for passengers with monthly passes. With the abolition of the conductor position, passenger were allowed to enter only at the first door, where the driver oversaw the payment. Initially, the tokens were made from paper, then the most recognizable were metal tokens with a hole, thereafter plastic tokens replaced them, also different colours and shapes were available through time. Tokens were abolished on January 1, 2010, and cash payment on May 10, 2010.

As of 2023 payment is possible using a contactless debit/credit card or using the Urbana card either physical or in the Urbana app on a smartphone.

=== Urbana ===
Single ticket is available for unlimited number of transfers within 90 minutes, or monthly passes of different categories.

== See also ==
- City bus service no. 1 (Ljubljana)
- City bus service no. 6 (Ljubljana)
- City bus service no. 20 (Ljubljana)

== Sources and references ==
- Tadej Brate (1997). Ljubljanski tramvaj včeraj, danes, jutri = Ljubljana tramway yesterday, today, tomorrow. Tehniški muzej Slovenije. ISBN 961-90361-3-1.
- Tadej Brate (2005). Zgodovina mestnega prometa v Ljubljani. LPP d.o.o. ISBN 961-91685-0-X.
- Tadej Brate (2008). Ljubljanski mestni promet v slikah. Kmečki glas. ISBN 978-961-203-343-9.
