= Dečja Vas pri Zagradcu =

Dečja Vas pri Zagradcu Dečja Vas (until 1953)
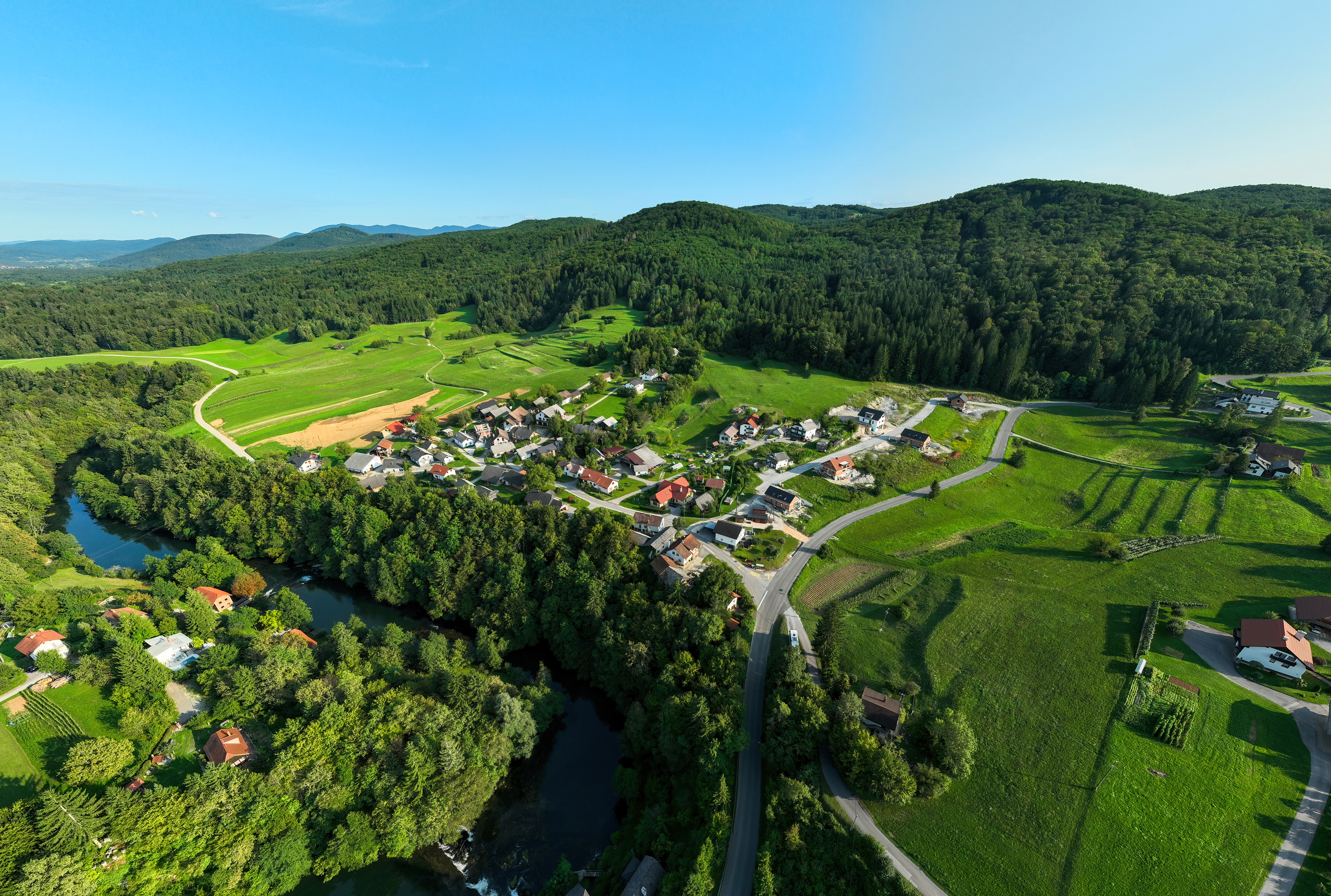

- Location in Slovenia
- Coordinates: 45°51′20.32″N 14°50′7.5″E
- Country: Slovenia
- Traditional region: Lower Carniola
- Statistical region: Central Slovenia
- Municipality: Ivančna Gorica

Area
  - Total: 2.51 km^{2} (0.97 sq mi)
- Elevation: 274.1 m (899 ft)

Population (2002)
  - Total: 93

Dečja Vas pri Zagradcu (pronounced [ˈdeːtʃja ˈʋaːs pɾi zaˈɡɾaːtsu]; Slovene: Dečja vas pri Zagradcu) is a village on the right bank of the Krka River opposite Zagradec in the Municipality of Ivančna Gorica in central Slovenia. The area is part of the historical region of Lower Carniola. The municipality is now included in the Central Slovenia Statistical Region.

== Name ==
The name of the settlement was changed from Dečja vas to Dečja vas pri Zagradcu in 1953.
