= Brezovi Dol =

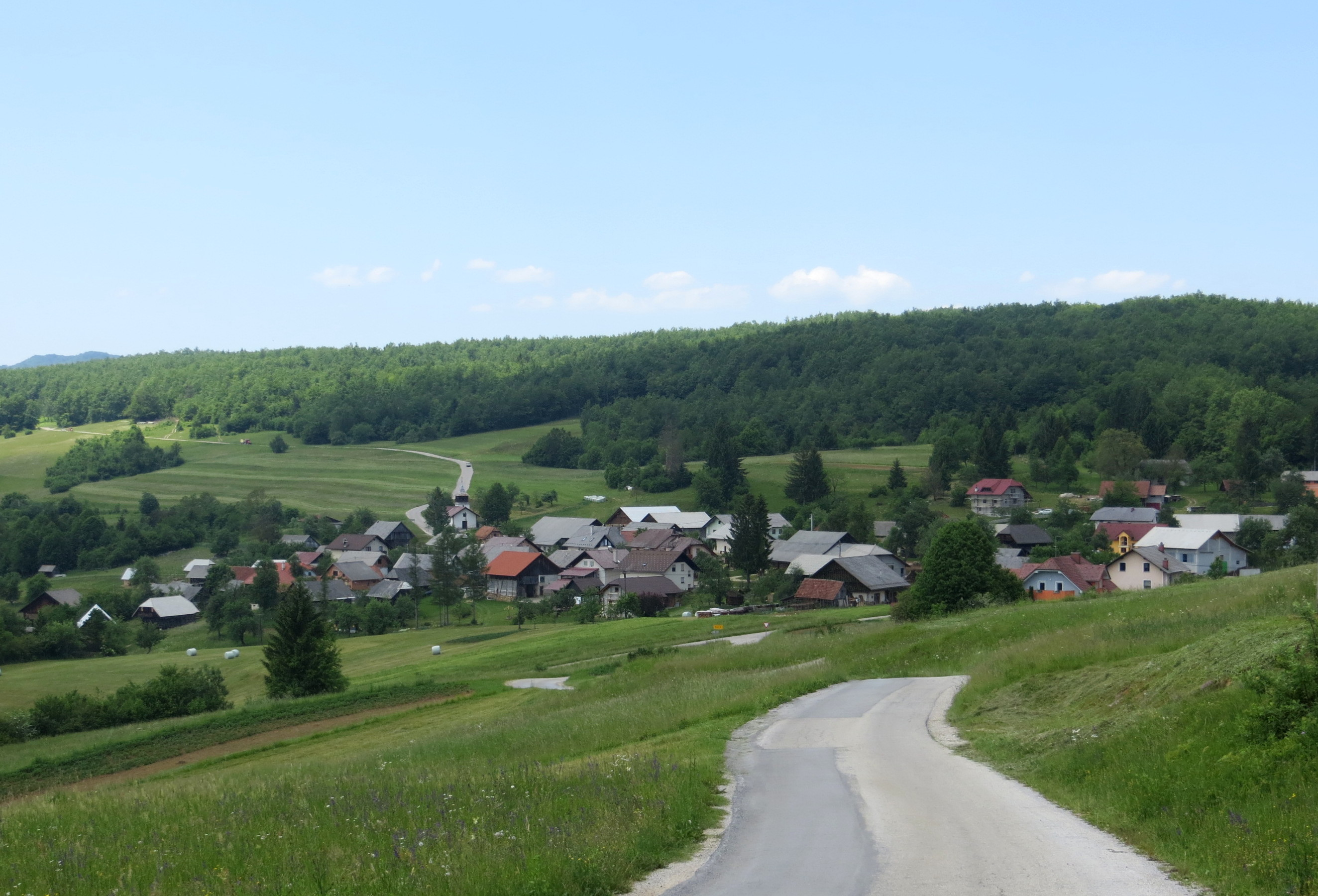

- Location in Slovenia
- Coordinates: 45°49′20.2″N 14°50′48.62″E
- Country: Slovenia
- Traditional region: Lower Carniola
- Statistical region: Central Slovenia
- Municipality: Ivančna Gorica

Area
  - Total: 4.56 km^{2} (1.76 sq mi)
- Elevation: 366.8 m (1,203 ft)

Population (2002)
  - Total: 157

Brezovi Dol (pronounced [ˈbɾeːzɔʋi ˈdoːu̯]; in older sources also Brezov Dol, German: Birkenthal) is a village east of Ambrus in the Municipality of Ivančna Gorica in central Slovenia. The area is part of the historical region of Lower Carniola and is now included in the Central Slovenia Statistical Region.

== Name ==
The name Brezovi Dol literally means 'birch valley', derived from the common noun breza 'birch'. Like similar toponyms in Slovenia (e.g., Brezova, Brezovec, Brezovci), it originally referred to the local vegetation. The German name Birkenthal also means 'birch valley'.

== History ==
During the Second World War, Italian forces burned a number of houses in the village in July 1942.

== Cultural heritage ==
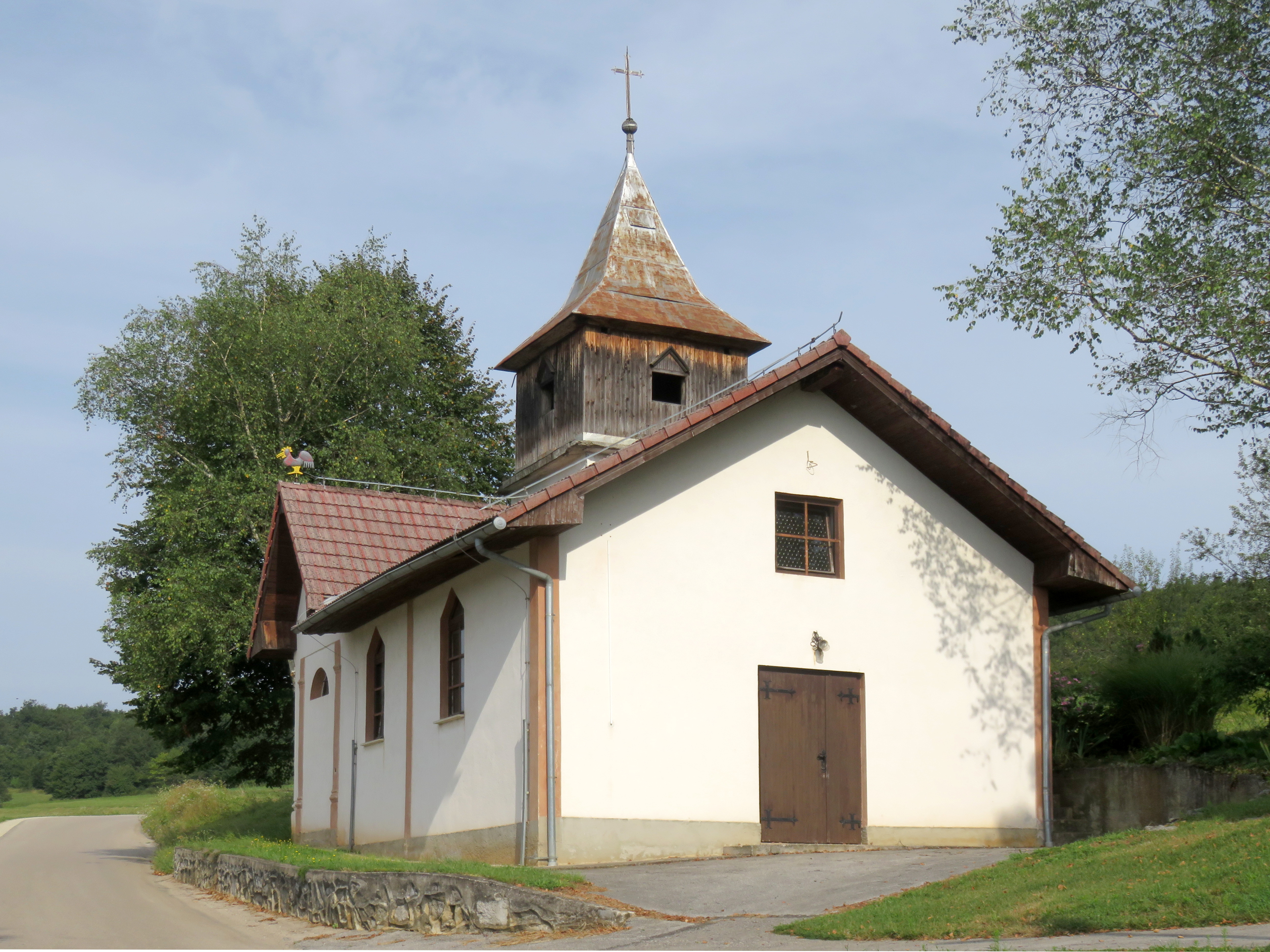
Immaculate Heart of Mary Church

Immaculate Heart of Mary Church on the western outskirts of the village incorporates a chapel-shrine dedicated to the Virgin Mary. It dates from the late 19th century.
