= Kitni Vrh =

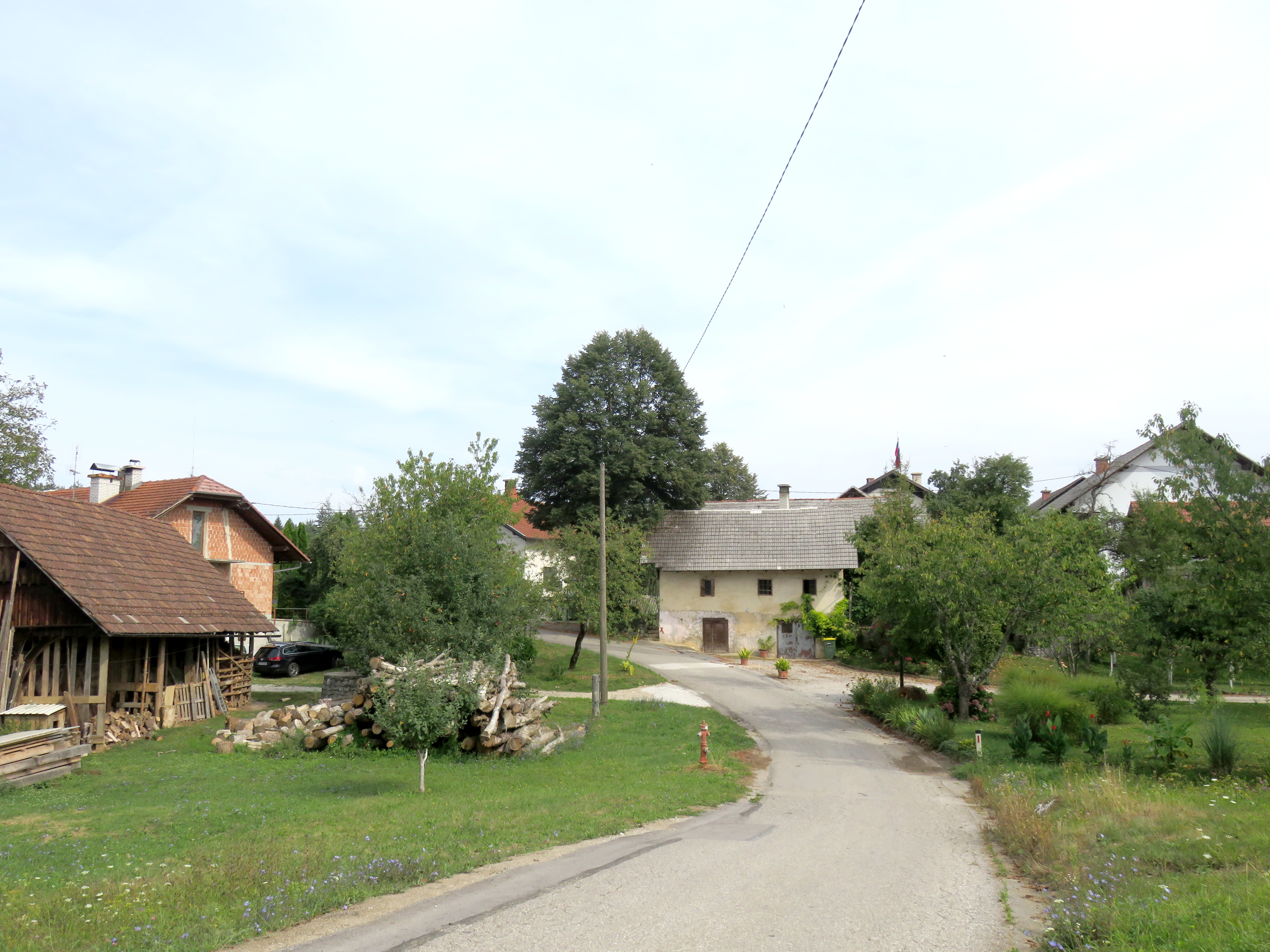

- Location in Slovenia
- Coordinates: 45°52′45.52″N 14°50′12.36″E
- Country: Slovenia
- Traditional region: Lower Carniola
- Statistical region: Central Slovenia
- Municipality: Ivančna Gorica

Area
  - Total: 1.69 km^{2} (0.65 sq mi)
- Elevation: 360.9 m (1,184 ft)

Population (2002)
  - Total: 75

Kitni Vrh (pronounced [ˈkiːtni ˈʋəɾx]; German: Kütenberg) is a small settlement just above Gabrovka pri Zagradcu in the Municipality of Ivančna Gorica in central Slovenia. The area is part of the historical region of Lower Carniola. The municipality is now included in the Central Slovenia Statistical Region.

== Geography ==
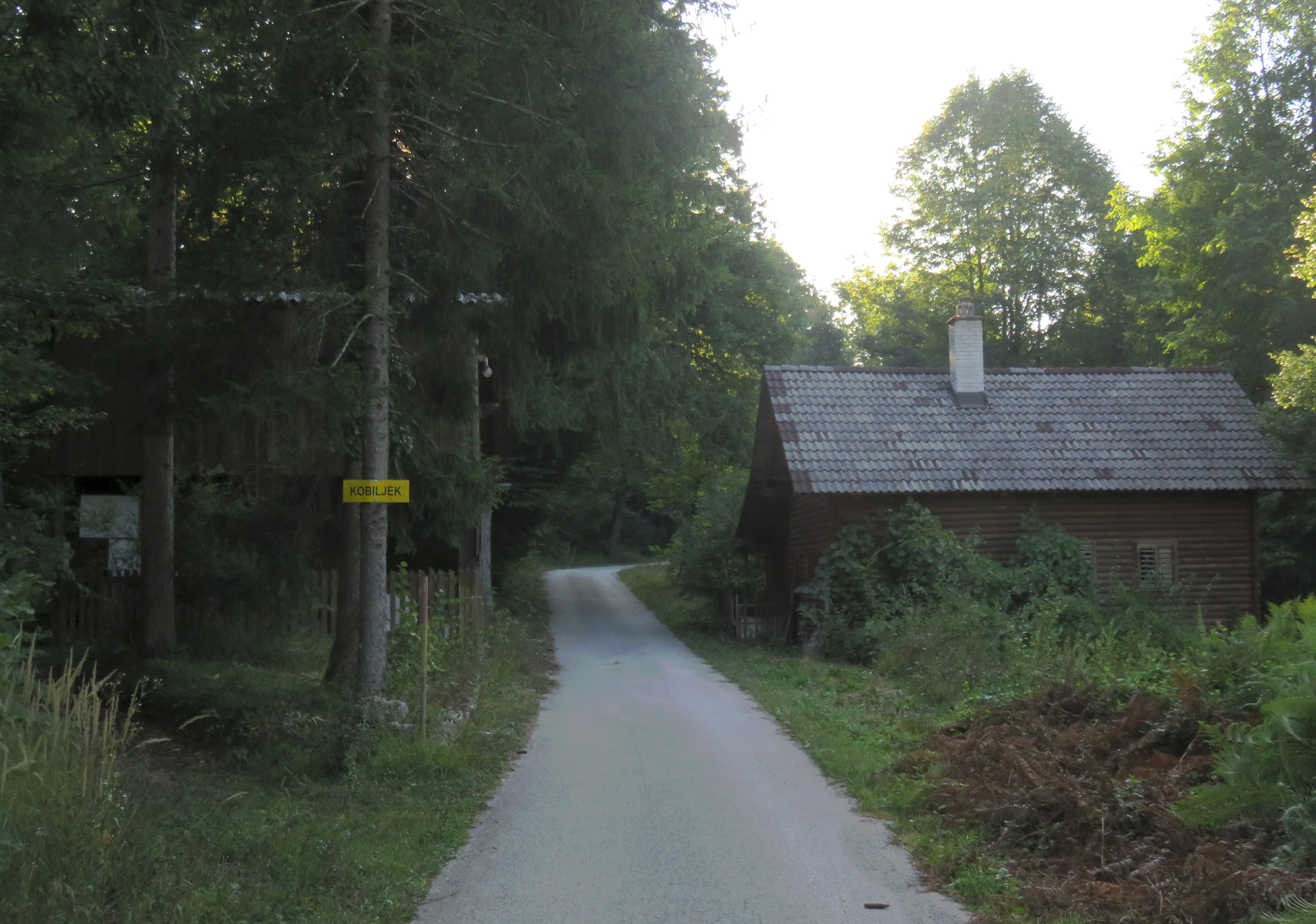
The hamlet of Kobiljek with the route of the Roman road

Kitni Vrh is a clustered village on an uneven karst plateau. The area is planted with orchards; mostly apples, plums, and walnuts. The Korita Valley—a dry karst valley with sinkholes—lies below the houses to the east, where there are also low-quality hay fields. To the west there are sinkholes named Luža (literally, 'puddle'), Dol ('valley'), and Globoka dolina ('deep valley') surrounded by pastures. The hamlet of Kobiljek lies northeast of the main settlement. The soil in the area is shallow and has poor fertility; better-quality soil is located only to the north, in the field areas named Brze and Ograja.

== History ==
A Roman road led through the hamlet of Kobiljek in antiquity. The route fell into disuse after 1960, when a new road connection was built to Gabrovka pri Zagradcu. Before the first World War, brown coal was mined near the Luža sinkhole; the deposits lay just below the surface and were quickly exhausted.
