= City bus service no. 20 (Ljubljana) =

Bus line in Ljubljana, Slovenia

20 20Z

Overview
- Vehicle: Articulated bus
- Began service: 1978
- Night-time: n/a

Route
- Termini: Nove Stožiče P+R; Fužine P+R
- Length: 21.8 km

Service
- Frequency: 6-30 min.

City bus line number 20 Nove Stožice P+R – Fužine P+R is the third most heavily loaded of the 32 bus lines in Ljubljana. Annually approximately 9,000,000 passengers are transported. Takes place in the North - East corridors on some busiest roads connecting Nove Stožice, Bežigrad, Krakovo, Vodmat, Moste, Nove Fužine with the city center (Bavarski dvor).

== Line variants ==
- 20 Nove Stožice P+R – Fužine P+R (Weekdays - 4.53-22.25, Saturdays - 5.00-22.25)
- 20Z Nove Stožice P+R – Fužine P+R – Zalog (Sundays and Public holidays - 6.00-22.25)

== Sources ==
- Tadej Brate (1997). Ljubljanski tramvaj včeraj, danes, jutri = Ljubljana tramway yesterday, today, tomorrow. Tehniški muzej Slovenije. ISBN 961-90361-3-1.
- Tadej Brate (2005). Zgodovina mestnega prometa v Ljubljani. LPP d.o.o. ISBN 961-91685-0-X.
- Tadej Brate (2008). Ljubljanski mestni promet v slikah. Kmečki glas. ISBN 978-961-203-343-9.

== See also ==
- Ljubljana Passenger Transport
- City bus service no. 1 (Ljubljana)
- City bus service no. 6 (Ljubljana)
