= Valična Vas =

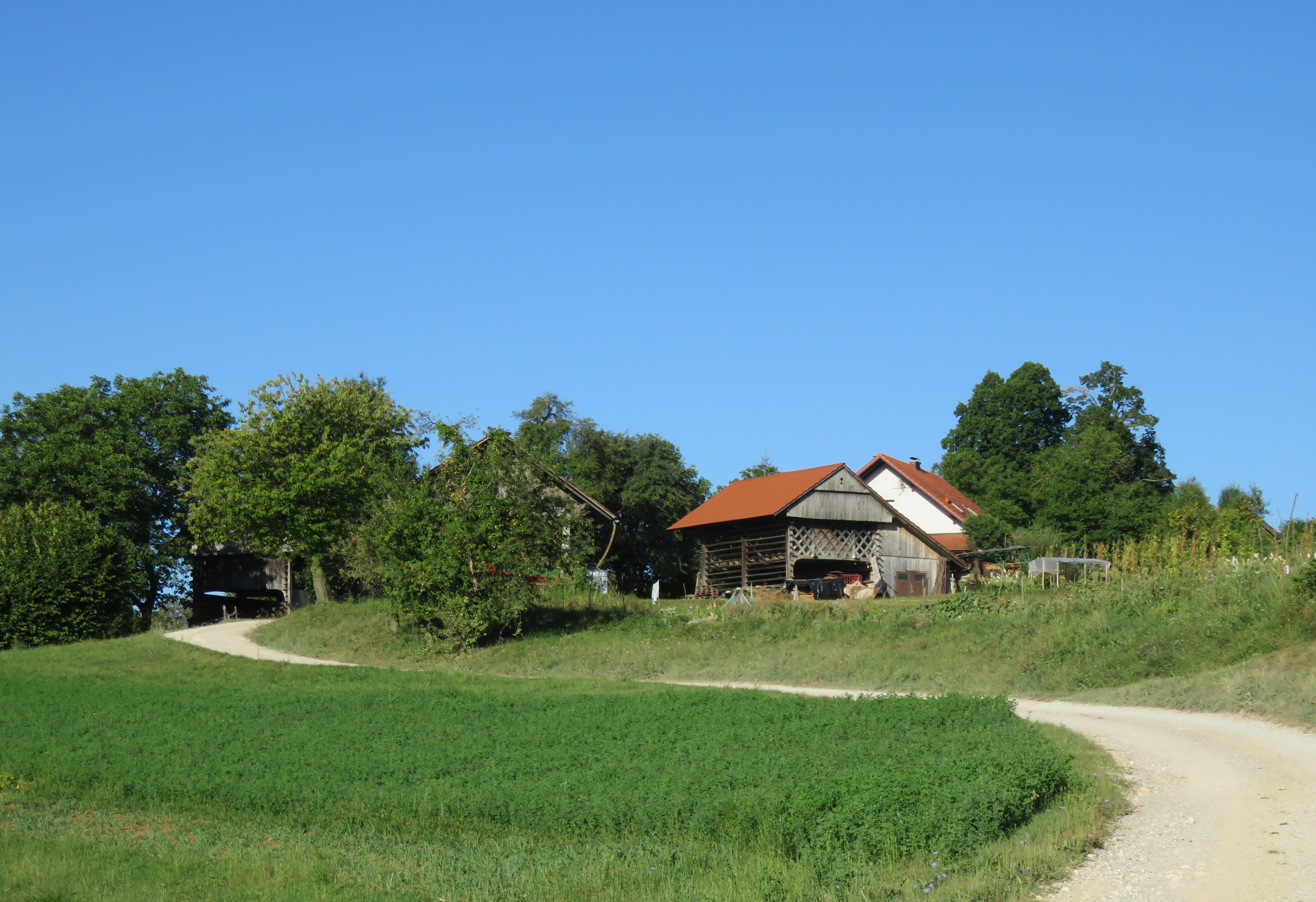

- Location in Slovenia
- Coordinates: 45°51′40.25″N 14°52′23.29″E
- Country: Slovenia
- Traditional region: Lower Carniola
- Statistical region: Central Slovenia
- Municipality: Ivančna Gorica

Area
  - Total: 1.74 km^{2} (0.67 sq mi)
- Elevation: 393.6 m (1,291 ft)

Population (2002)
  - Total: 31

Valična Vas (pronounced [ʋaˈliːtʃna ˈʋaːs]; Slovene: Valična vas) is a village in the Municipality of Ivančna Gorica in central Slovenia. The area is part of the historical region of Lower Carniola. The municipality is now included in the Central Slovenia Statistical Region.

The local church is dedicated to Saint Martin and belongs to the Parish of Zagradec.
