= Gabrovka pri Zagradcu =

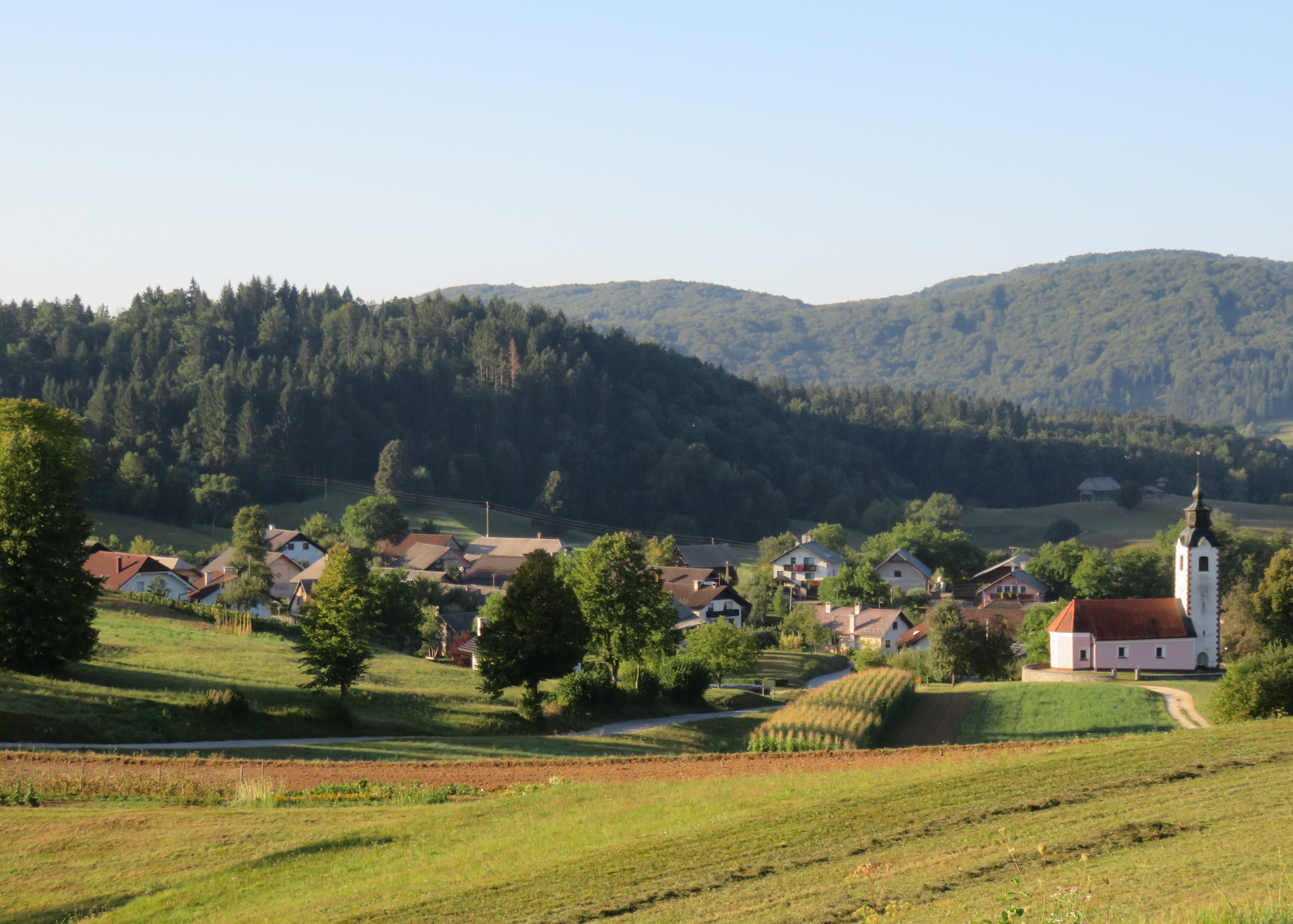

- Location in Slovenia
- Coordinates: 45°52′16.71″N 14°50′26.35″E
- Country: Slovenia
- Traditional region: Lower Carniola
- Statistical region: Central Slovenia
- Municipality: Ivančna Gorica

Area
  - Total: 2.53 km^{2} (0.98 sq mi)
- Elevation: 294.9 m (968 ft)

Population (2002)
  - Total: 87

Gabrovka pri Zagradcu (pronounced [ˈɡaːbɾɔu̯ka pɾi zaˈɡɾaːtsu]) is a village north of Zagradec in the Municipality of Ivančna Gorica in central Slovenia. The area is part of the historical region of Lower Carniola. The municipality is now included in the Central Slovenia Statistical Region.

== Church ==
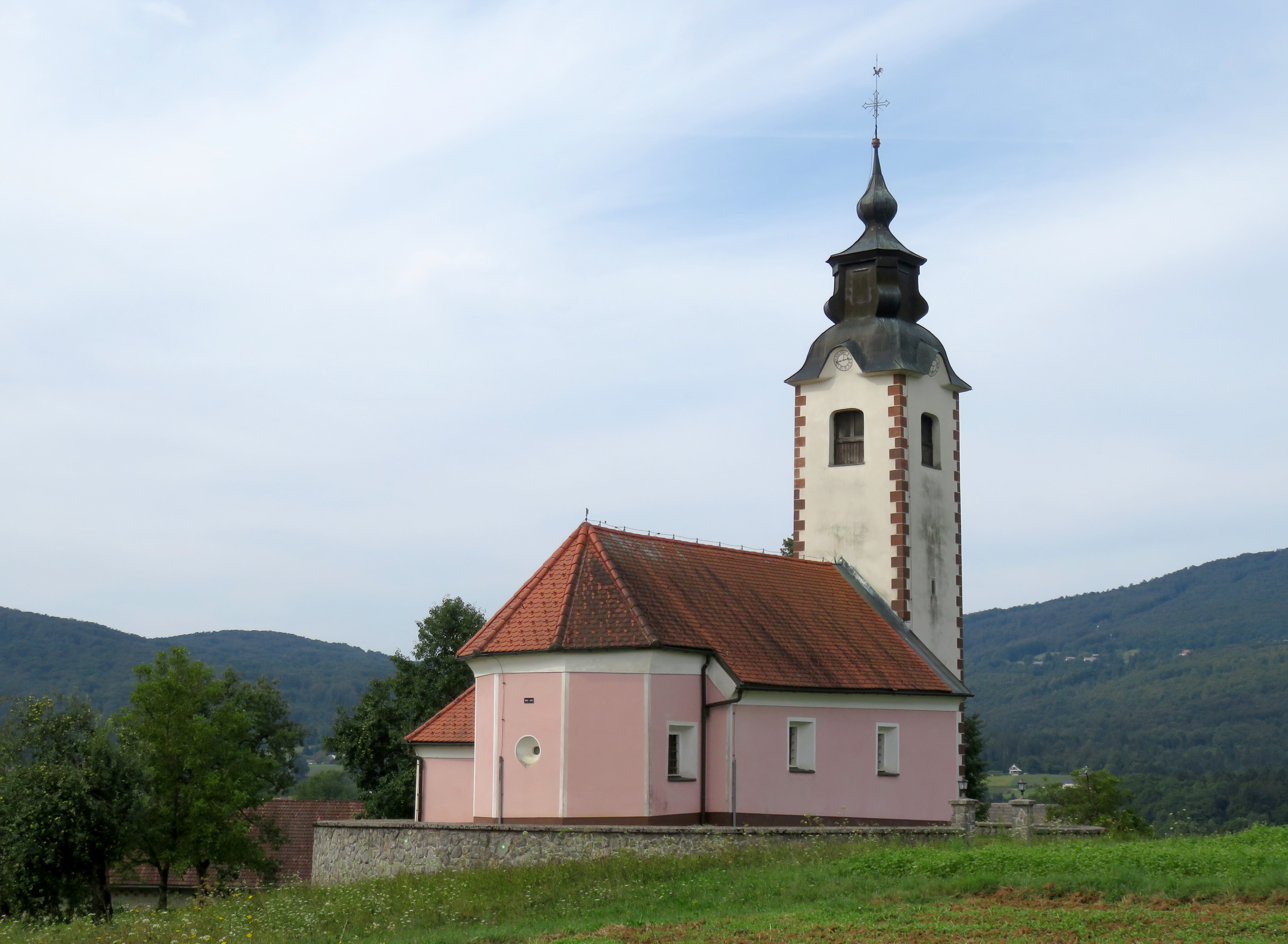
Saints Primus and Felician Church

The local church is dedicated to Saints Primus and Felician, and it belongs to the Parish of Zagradec. It dates to the 17th century.
