= Breg pri Zagradcu =

Breg pri Zagradcu Breg (until 1953)
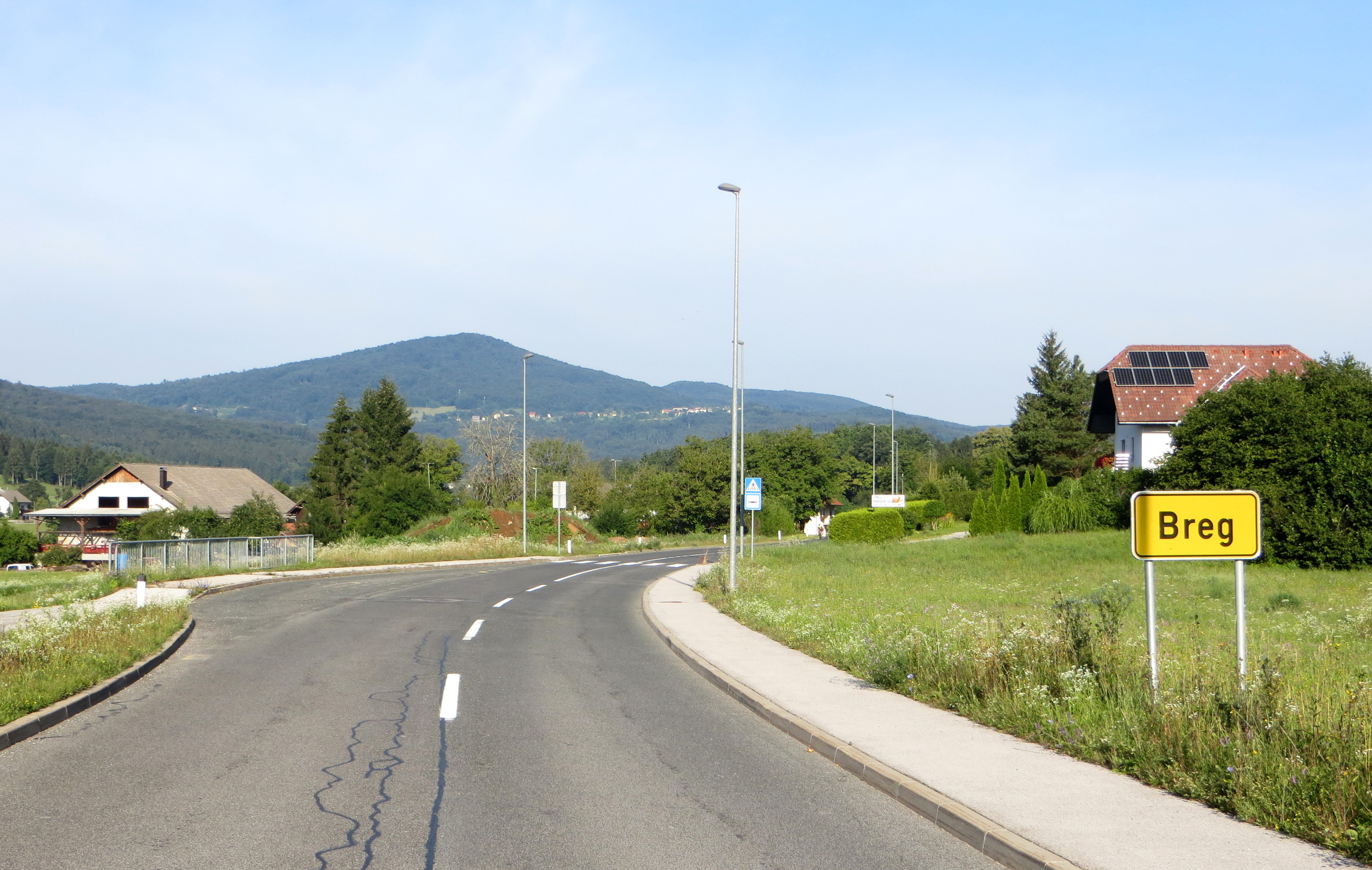

- Location in Slovenia
- Coordinates: 45°51′28.85″N 14°51′30.93″E
- Country: Slovenia
- Traditional region: Lower Carniola
- Statistical region: Central Slovenia
- Municipality: Ivančna Gorica

Area
  - Total: 0.32 km^{2} (0.12 sq mi)
- Elevation: 260.1 m (853 ft)

Population (2002)
  - Total: 24

Breg pri Zagradcu (pronounced [ˈbɾeːk pɾi zaˈɡɾaːtsu]) is a small settlement east of Zagradec on the left bank of the Krka River in the Municipality of Ivančna Gorica in central Slovenia. The area is part of the historical region of Lower Carniola. The municipality is now included in the Central Slovenia Statistical Region.

== Name ==
Breg pri Zagradcu was attested in written sources as Rayn in 1444 and Rain c. 1457. The name of the settlement was changed from Breg to Breg pri Zagradcu in 1953.
