= City bus service no. 1 (Ljubljana) =

Bus line in Ljubljana, Slovenia

1 1B • N1

Overview
- Vehicle: Articulated bus
- Night-time: N1

Route
- Termini: Vižmarje; Mestni log
- Length: 22.0 km

Service
- Frequency: 5-20 min.

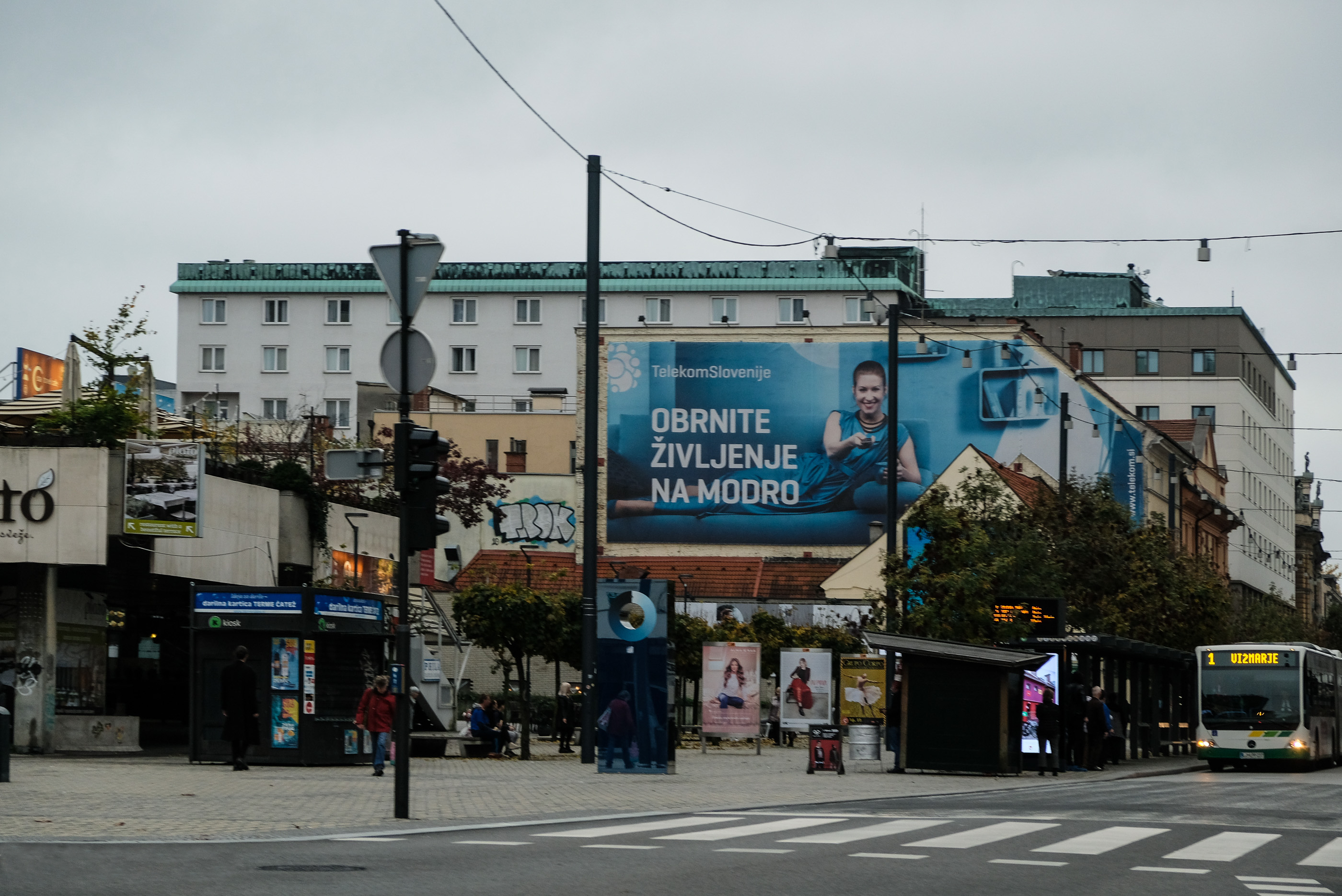

City bus service number 1 Vižmarje – Mestni log is the second largest bus line of the 32 bus lines in Ljubljana, Slovenia. It transports approximately 10,000,000 passengers every year. Geographically, it connects the northwest and southwest of Ljubljana, passing through Vižmarje, Šentvid, Trata, Šiška, Ajdovščina, Vič, Murgle, and Mestni log.

== History ==
Before World War II, Šentvid and Vič were connected to the center of Ljubljana by a tramway. After May 1957, there was a gradual discontinuation of the tram service and former tramway routes. During an interim period of a week, the Šentvid – Ajdovščina and Vič – Ajdovščina stations were serviced by trolleybus route 1, Vižmarje – Vič. The last day of operations for the former tram service was 4 September 1971. After this date, buses commenced operation on the new route: Vižmarje – Mestni log. In the city center, buses initially crossed the Bavarski Dvor locality.

In the early 20th century, the former turnout of today's Krimska bus stop was moved to Koper Street, where it remains today. In October 2003, the night route 1a extended to Mestni log (Brod – Bavarski dvor – Mestni log) over the Bavarski dvor in both directions, with the last journey starting at 30 minutes past midnight. In July of the following year, the route returned to its old operating timetable (Bavarski dvor – Brod). The route was extended to Brod on Sundays in the summer of 2004, when route 8 stopped operating on Sundays. Routes to Avtosejem (English: Car fair) had already been introduced several years earlier. In autumn 2007, night route 1a was re-numbered to line N1; the Sunday extension to Brod was re-numbered to line 1B and the extension to Nedeljski sejem (English: Sunday fair) was re-numbered to line 1S. The bus routes were not altered by the "number changes". On 26 June 2008, lines 26, 26B, and 26C were discontinued and lines 1B, 1S, N1, and 8 were extended to Gameljne. On 28 June 2010, operating hours on line N1 were extended with the first departure from Bavarski dvor at 02:50 on weekdays and Saturdays. Furthermore, the operating hours on Sundays were extended until 03:50; public holiday operating hours were changed to end at 00:20. The line was more recently shortened from Gameljne to Brod (Bavarski dvor – Brod). Line 1 was rerouted on 3 December 2012 to the new Mestni log layover loop.

== Line variants ==
- 1 Vižmarje – Mestni log (Weekdays - 04:55-22.42, Saturdays - 05:00-22:45)
- 1B Gameljne – Vižmarje – Mestni log (Sundays and Public holidays - 05:50-22:45)
- N1 Bavarski dvor – Vižmarje – Brod (Weekdays and Saturdays - 02:50-04:30, Sundays and Public holidays - 03:50-05:30, Daily - 23:40–00:20)
- N1 Bavarski dvor – Vižmarje – Brod – Gameljne (Daily - 22:30-23:50)

== Sources ==
- Tadej Brate (1997). Ljubljanski tramvaj včeraj, danes, jutri = Ljubljana tramway yesterday, today, tomorrow. Tehniški muzej Slovenije. ISBN 961-90361-3-1.
- Tadej Brate (2005). Zgodovina mestnega prometa v Ljubljani. LPP d.o.o. ISBN 961-91685-0-X.
- Tadej Brate (2008). Ljubljanski mestni promet v slikah. Kmečki glas. ISBN 978-961-203-343-9.

== See also ==
- Ljubljana Passenger Transport
- City bus service no. 6 (Ljubljana)
- City bus service no. 20 (Ljubljana)
