= Škocjan, Grosuplje =

Škocjan Staro Apno (until 1990), Škocjan pri Turjaku
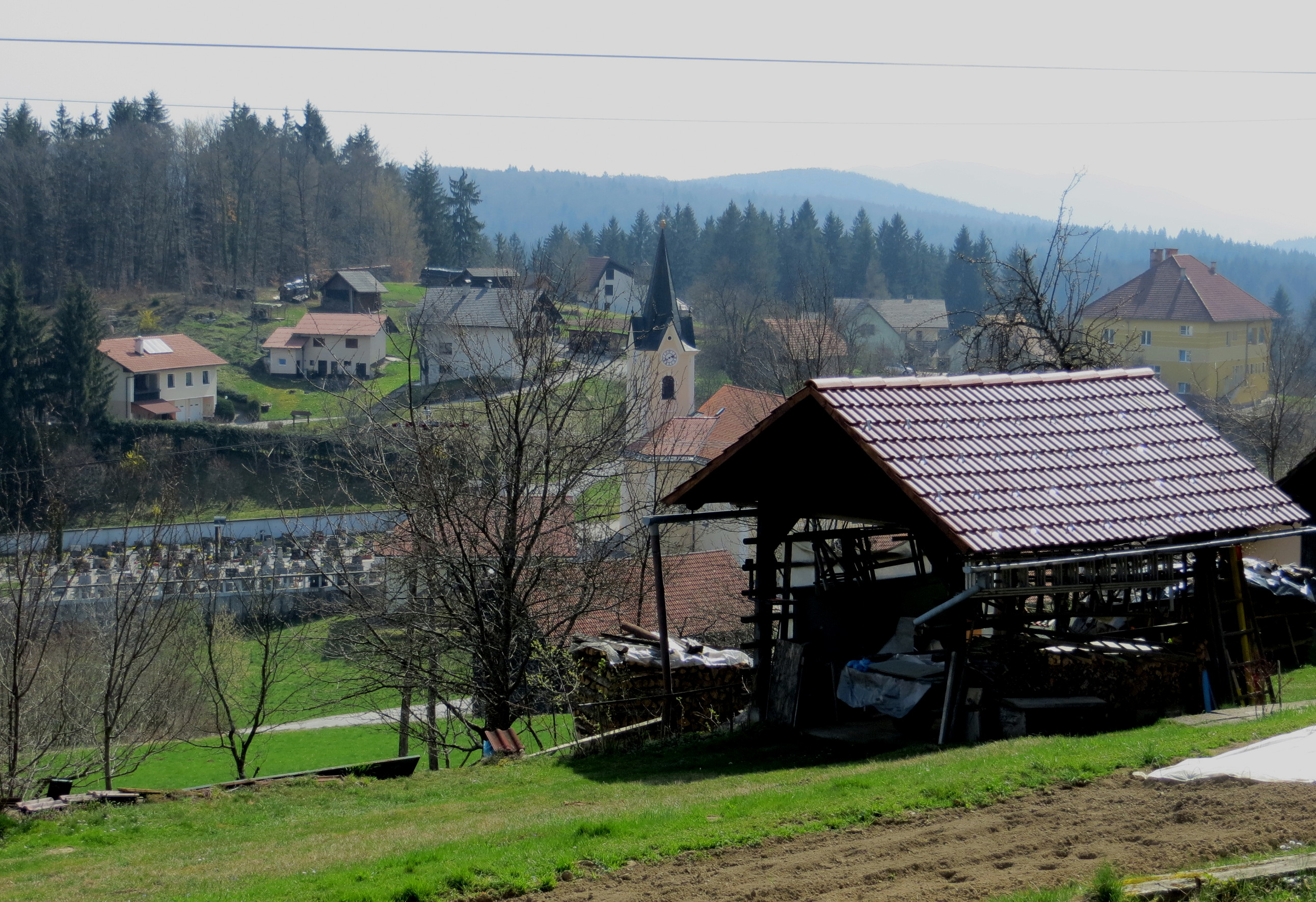

- Location in Slovenia
- Coordinates: 45°53′5.53″N 14°37′57.6″E
- Country: Slovenia
- Traditional region: Lower Carniola
- Statistical region: Central Slovenia
- Municipality: Grosuplje

Area
  - Total: 2 km^{2} (0.77 sq mi)
- Elevation: 492 m (1,614 ft)

Population (2002)
  - Total: 66

Škocjan (pronounced [ˈʃkoːtsjan]) is a settlement in the Municipality of Grosuplje in central Slovenia. It lies in the hills south of Grosuplje, near Turjak. The area is part of the historical region of Lower Carniola. The municipality is now included in the Central Slovenia Statistical Region.

== Name ==
The name of the settlement was changed from Staro Apno to Škocjan (literally, 'Saint Cantius') in 1992. Although many former religious names of settlements in Slovenian were restored after the fall of communism, this is one of the few cases of a settlement receiving a religious name after 1990 even though it did not have a religious name before the Second World War.

== Church ==
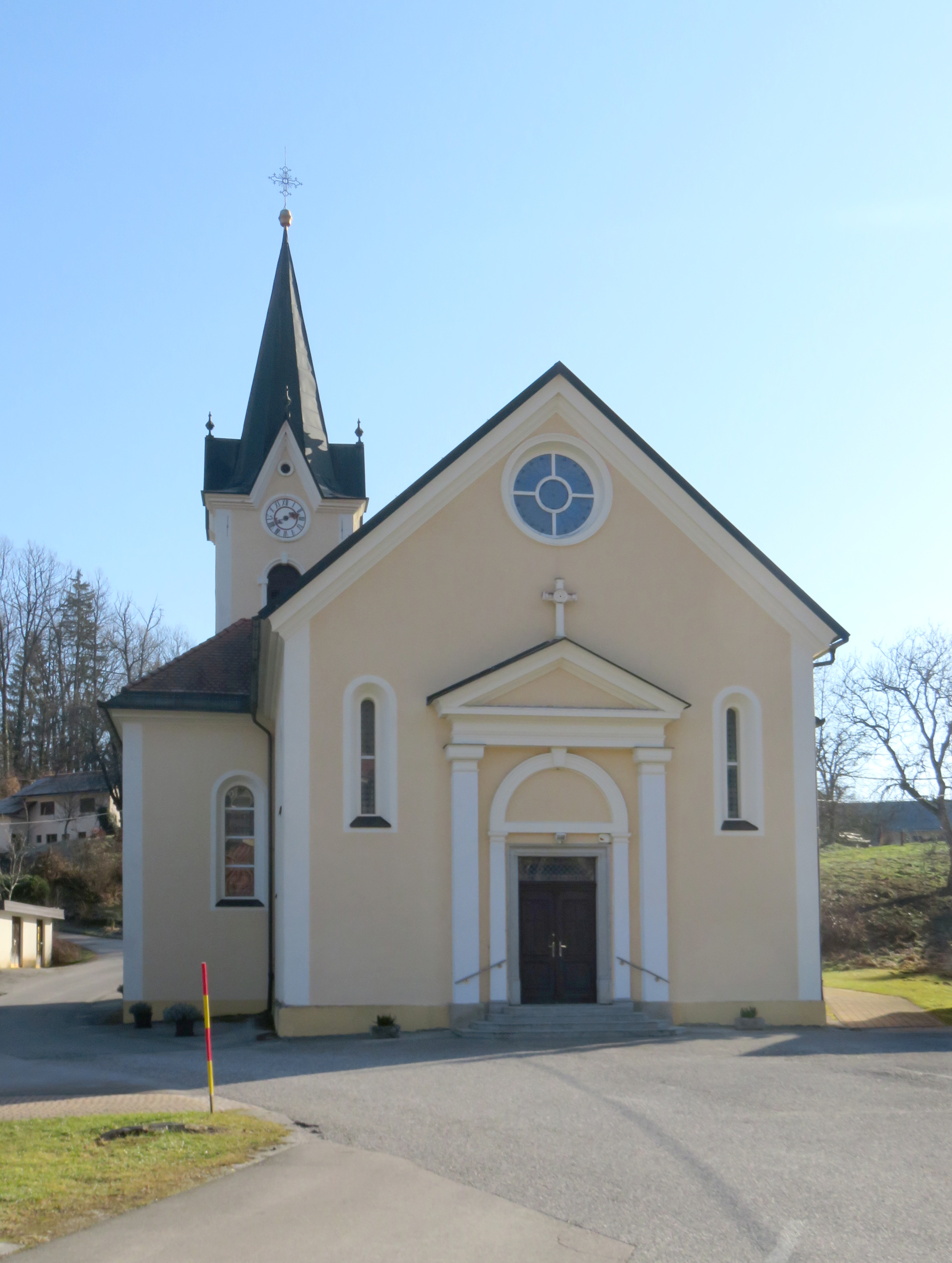
View from west

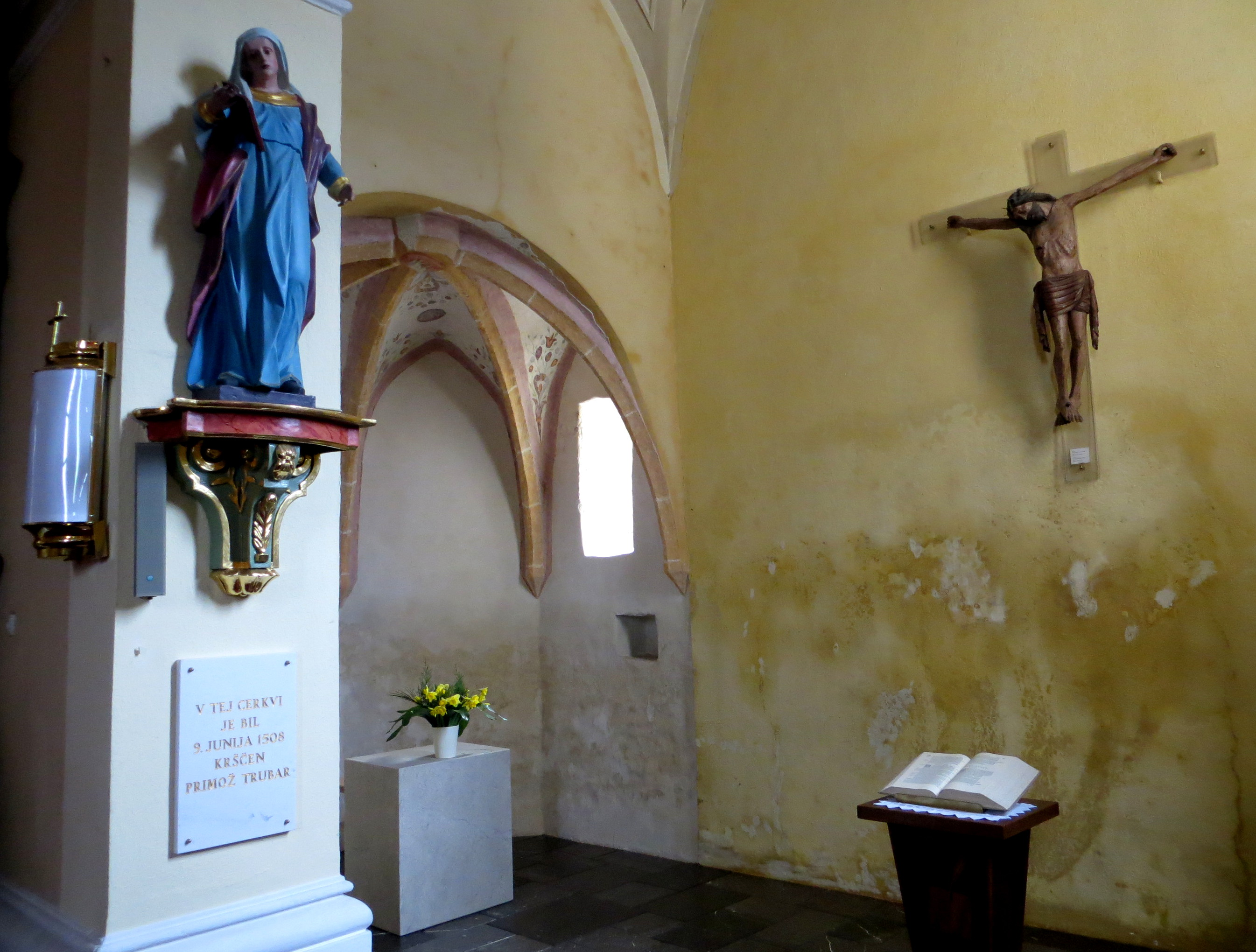
Side chapel

Saint Cantianus' Church

The parish church in the village is dedicated to Saint Cantianus and belongs to the Roman Catholic Archdiocese of Ljubljana. It was first mentioned in written documents dating to 1260 and restyled in the Baroque in the mid-18th century and extensively rebuilt in 1906 by the master mason Janez Ronko Jr (1876–1963). Part of the original church is preserved as a side chapel. The Slovene Protestant reformer Primož Trubar was christened in the chapel in 1508.
