= City bus service no. 6 (Ljubljana) =

Bus line in Ljubljana, Slovenia

6 • 6B

Overview
- Vehicle: Articulated bus
- Began service: 6 October 1951
- Night-time: 6

Route
- Termini: Črnuče; Dolgi most P+R
- Length: 22.8 km

Service
- Frequency: 4–40 min.

City bus service number 6 Črnuče – Dolgi most is the most heavily used and frequent of 32 bus lines in Ljubljana. Annually approximately 16,000,000 passengers are transported. It passes the North - South corridor of Ljubljana on the busiest roads connecting Črnuče, Ježica, Bežigrad, Bavarski dvor, Vič and Dolgi most.

== History ==
In 1928 bus route Vič – Črnuče was opened. Before World War II it had been cancelled because of unreliability and competition with tramway. On 27 May 1931 a new tramway line section was opened, called the Vič line, with a turning point near the Vič church. After World War II the Vič was still connected to the center of town with a tramway and Bežigrad with Ježica. Since 6 October 1951 the trolleybus route Razstavišče (Vilharjeva road) – Ježica also connects to the town center. In May 1956 the trolleybus route was extended from Vilharjeva over a railway line passing through the Bavarski dvor to Ajdovščina where a temporary transfer station was located. After the abolition of the tramway in 1958, the discontinued section was handed over to trolleybus and route no. 6 and Vič – Ježica was created.

In the late sixties the trolleybus routes were discontinued and replaced with buses. In 1974 the route was extended from Ježica to Črnuče, after the opening of the Eastern Ljubljana ring road. A new turning point was arranged at Dolgi most. In 1991, after the Ten-Day War night service was shortened to the 24.00. In 2002, a new turning at the parking lot Dolgi most, the first Park and Ride in Ljubljana (beginning of 90th years of the 20th century), was introduced. In November 2003 night service was extended half an hour. But, in July 2004 it was again shortened until 24.00. From April 2008, on working days, approximately every fourth bus continues from Dolgi most to Vnanje Gorice in the municipality of Brezovica on newly created line no. 6B Črnuče – Vnanje Gorice. On 6 December 2008 Saturday, Sunday and Public holiday operation was introduced. On 28 June 2010 operation hours on line 6 were extended with the first departure from Bavarski dvor at 2.50 on Weekdays and Saturdays and 3.50 on Sundays and Public Holidays and the last at 0.20.

On 16 January 2012 line 6B was extended by 3 kilometres from Vnanje Gorice to Notranje Gorice.

== Line variants ==
- 6 Črnuče – Dolgi most P+R (Weekdays and Saturdays - 2.50-0.20, Sundays and Public holidays - 3.50-0.20)
- 6B Črnuče – Dolgi most – Notranje Gorice (Weekdays - 4.34-22.28, Saturdays - 5.45-20.00 and 22.13, Sundays and Public holidays - 5.45-19.50 and 22.13)

== Sources ==
- Tadej Brate (1997). Ljubljanski tramvaj včeraj, danes, jutri = Ljubljana tramway yesterday, today, tomorrow. Tehniški muzej Slovenije. ISBN 961-90361-3-1.
- Tadej Brate (2005). Zgodovina mestnega prometa v Ljubljani. LPP d.o.o. ISBN 961-91685-0-X.
- Tadej Brate (2008). Ljubljanski mestni promet v slikah. Kmečki glas. ISBN 978-961-203-343-9.

== See also ==
- Ljubljana Passenger Transport
- City bus service no. 1 (Ljubljana)
- City bus service no. 20 (Ljubljana)
