= Temenica, Ivančna Gorica =

Temenica
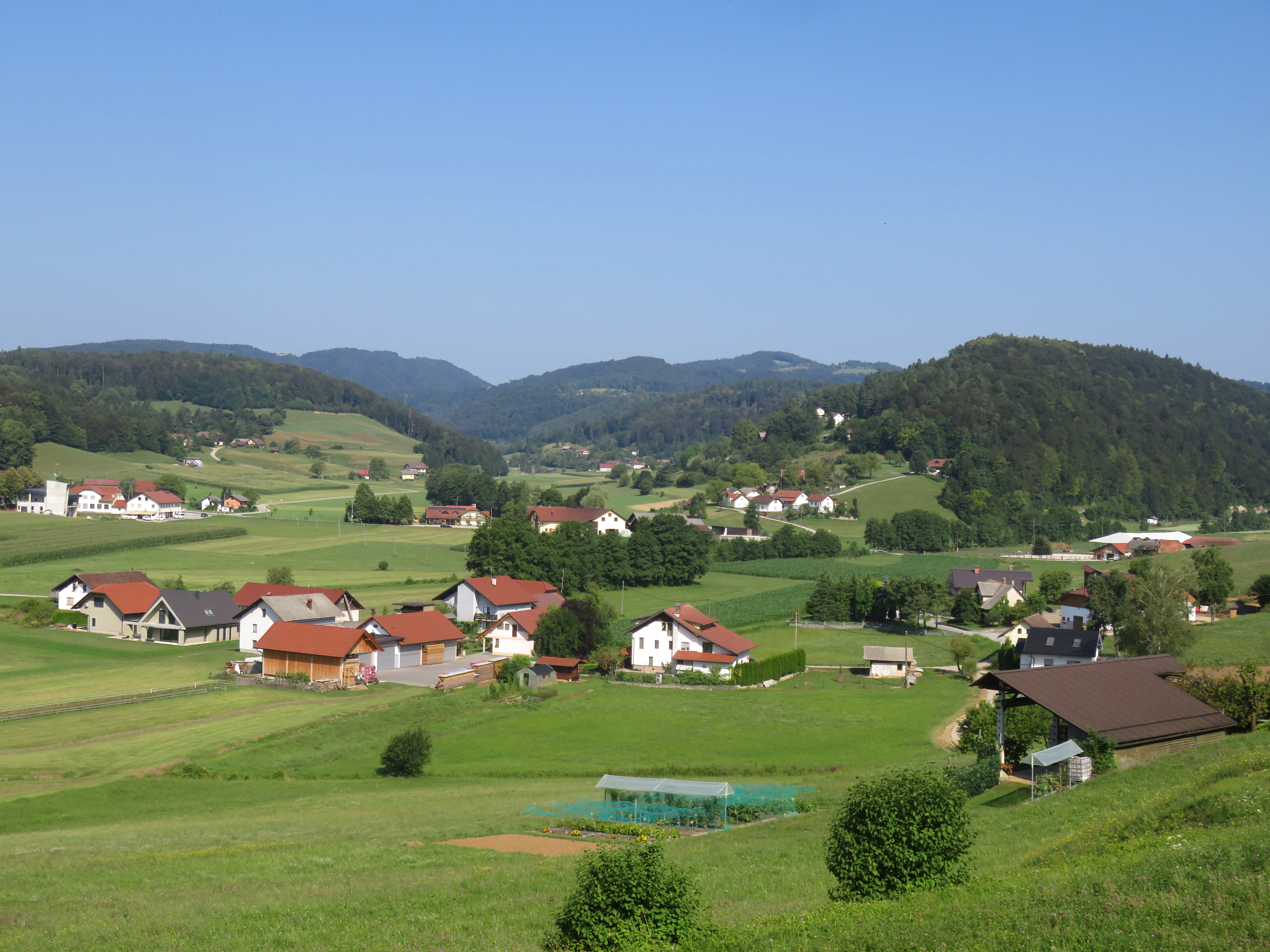

- Location in Slovenia
- Coordinates: 45°58′7.72″N 14°53′15.84″E
- Country: Slovenia
- Traditional region: Lower Carniola
- Statistical region: Central Slovenia
- Municipality: Ivančna Gorica

Area
  - Total: 2.16 km^{2} (0.83 sq mi)
- Elevation: 321.1 m (1,053 ft)

Population (2002)
  - Total: 155

Temenica (pronounced [ˈteːmɛnitsa]; German: Themenitz) is a settlement in the upper valley of the Temenica River in the Municipality of Ivančna Gorica in central Slovenia. The area is part of the historical region of Lower Carniola. The municipality is now included in the Central Slovenia Statistical Region. It includes the hamlets of Osredek (German: Osredek bei Themenitz), Debeli Hrib, Žabnica, Reber, and Pungrt.
