= Ambrus, Ivančna Gorica =

Ambrus
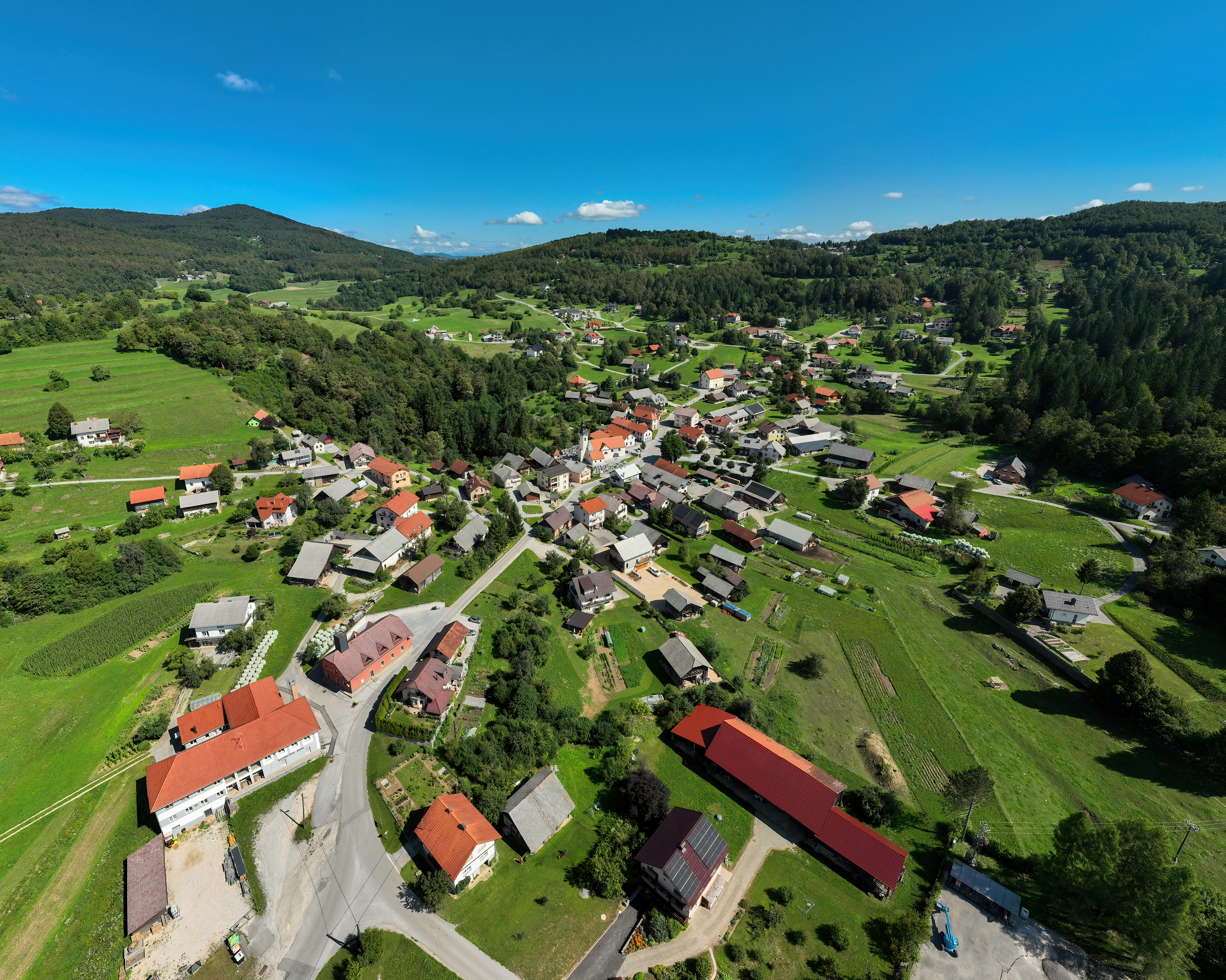

- Location in Slovenia
- Coordinates: 45°49′38.5″N 14°48′53.66″E
- Country: Slovenia
- Traditional region: Lower Carniola
- Statistical region: Central Slovenia
- Municipality: Ivančna Gorica

Area
  - Total: 5.67 km^{2} (2.19 sq mi)
- Elevation: 355.2 m (1,165 ft)

Population (2002)
  - Total: 261

Ambrus (pronounced [amˈbɾuːs] or [ˈaːmbɾus]) is a village in the Municipality of Ivančna Gorica in central Slovenia. The area is part of the historical region of Lower Carniola. The municipality is now included in the Central Slovenia Statistical Region.

== Name ==
Ambrus was attested in historical sources as Ambros in 1433, Ambruschs in 1463, and Wrwchs in 1484, among other variants.

== Church ==
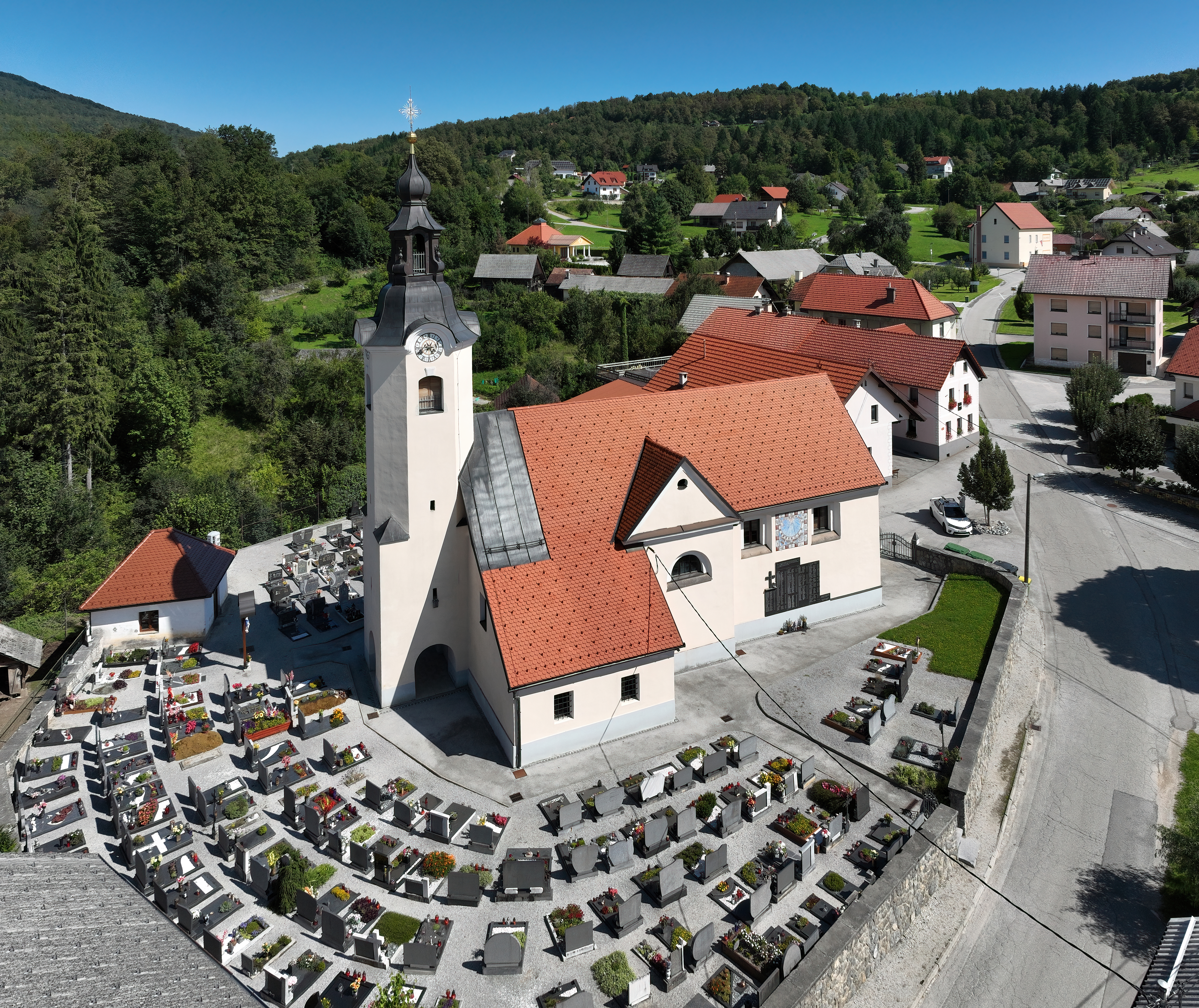
Saint Bartholomew's Church with cemetery

The parish church in the settlement is dedicated to Saint Bartholomew (Slovene: sveti Jernej) and belongs to the Roman Catholic Diocese of Novo Mesto. It was built in 1811.
