= Zagradec, Ivančna Gorica =

Zagradec
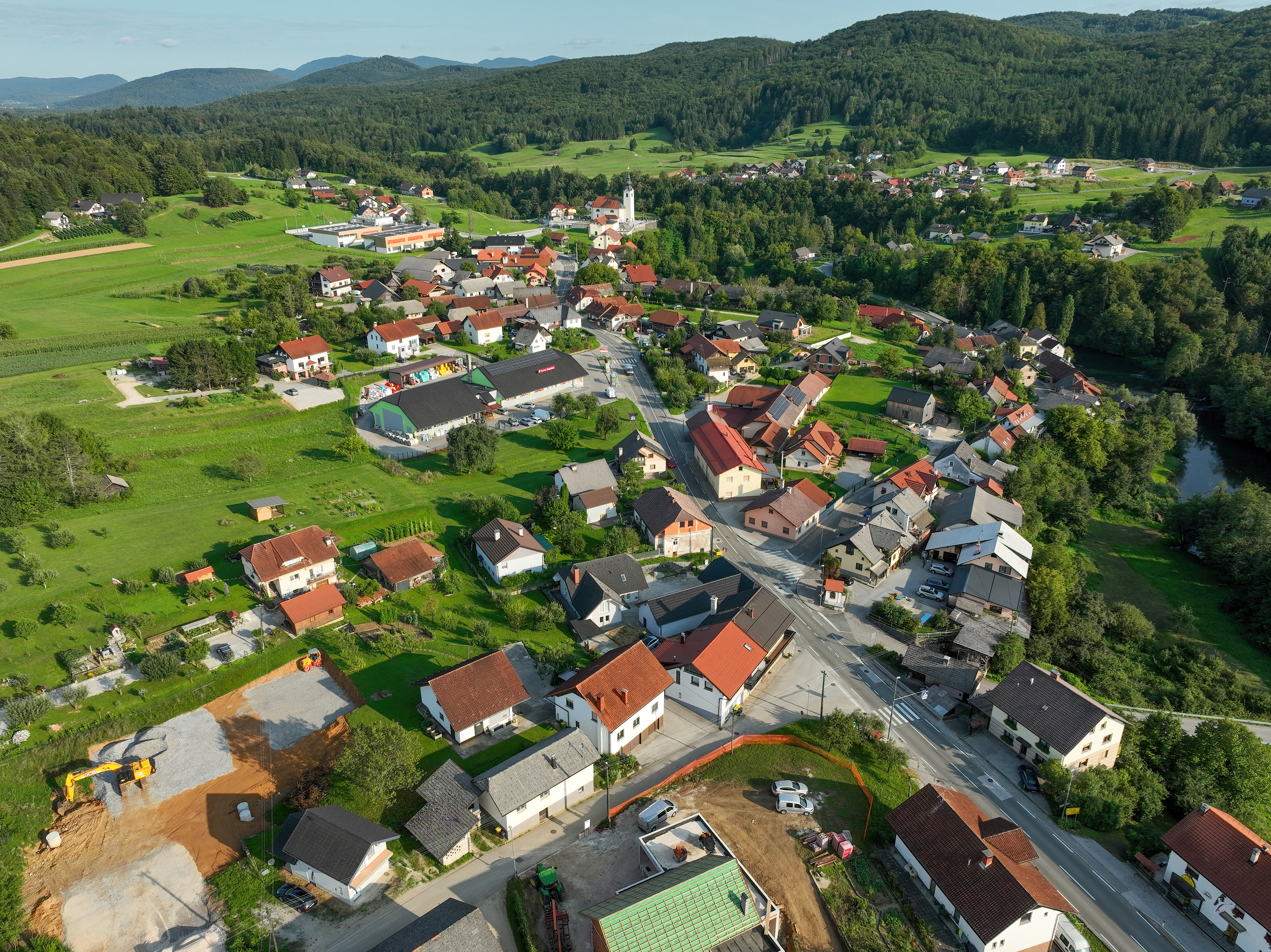

- Location in Slovenia
- Coordinates: 45°51′37.48″N 14°50′2.35″E
- Country: Slovenia
- Traditional region: Lower Carniola
- Statistical region: Central Slovenia
- Municipality: Ivančna Gorica

Area
  - Total: 0.7 km^{2} (0.27 sq mi)
- Elevation: 261.5 m (858 ft)

Population (2002)
  - Total: 99

Zagradec (pronounced [zaˈɡɾaːdəts]) is a settlement on the left bank of the Krka River in the Municipality of Ivančna Gorica in central Slovenia. The area is part of the historical region of Lower Carniola and the municipality is included in the Central Slovenia Statistical Region.

== Church ==
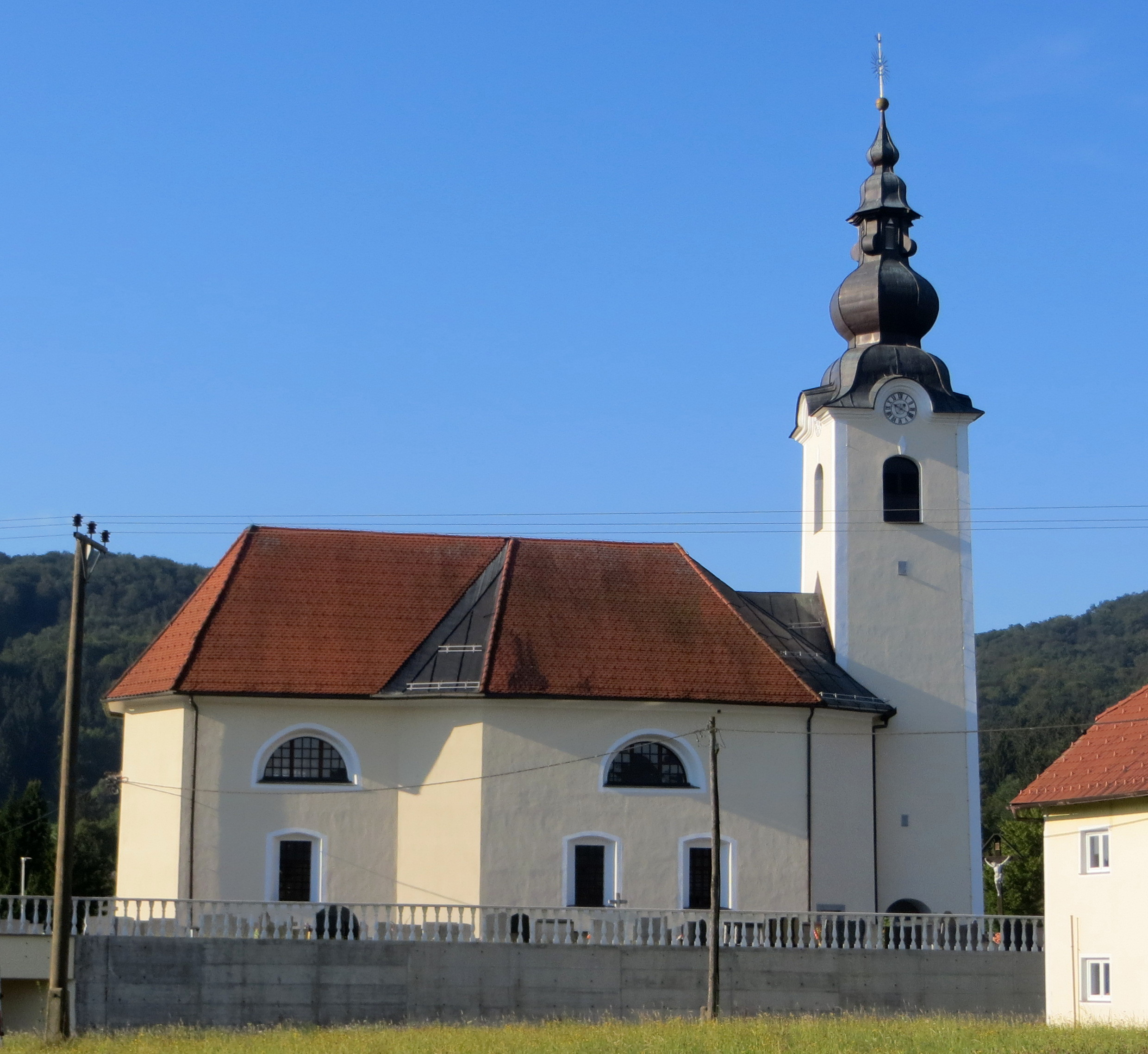
Immaculate Conception Church

The parish church in the settlement is dedicated to the Immaculate Conception and belongs to the Roman Catholic Diocese of Novo Mesto. It was built in 1797 on the site of an earlier church.
