= Dravlje District =

Dravlje District Četrtna skupnost Dravlje
- District
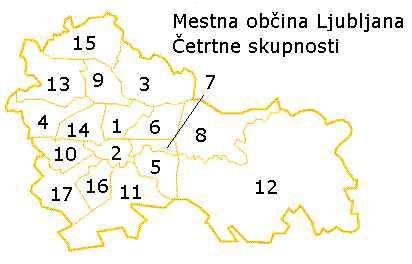
- Map of districts in Ljubljana. The Dravlje District is number 4.

- Location in Slovenia
- Coordinates: 46°4′49″N 14°28′47″E
- Country: Slovenia
- Traditional region: Upper Carniola
- Statistical region: Central Slovenia
- Municipality: Ljubljana

Area
  - Total: 11.11 km^{2} (4.29 sq mi)

Population (2014)
  - Total: 15,743

The Dravlje District (pronounced [ˈdɾaːu̯ljɛ]; Slovene: Četrtna skupnost Dravlje), or simply Dravlje, is a district of the City Municipality of Ljubljana, the capital of Slovenia. It is named after the former village of Dravlje.

== Geography ==
The Dravlje District is bounded on the south by a line running north of Grič to the outskirts of Stranska Vas; on the west by a line to Toško Čelo; on the north by a line arching down between Dolnice and Pržan and then following Pečnik Street (Pečnikova ulica), Jože Jama Street (Ulica Jožeta Jama), Stegne Street, and Waterworks Street (Vodovodna cesta); and on the east by the A2 Freeway and H2 Expressway. The district includes the former villages of Dolnice, Dravlje, Glinica (Glince), Kamna Gorica, Podutik and Zapuže.
