= Šiška District =

Šiška District Četrtna skupnost Šiška
- District
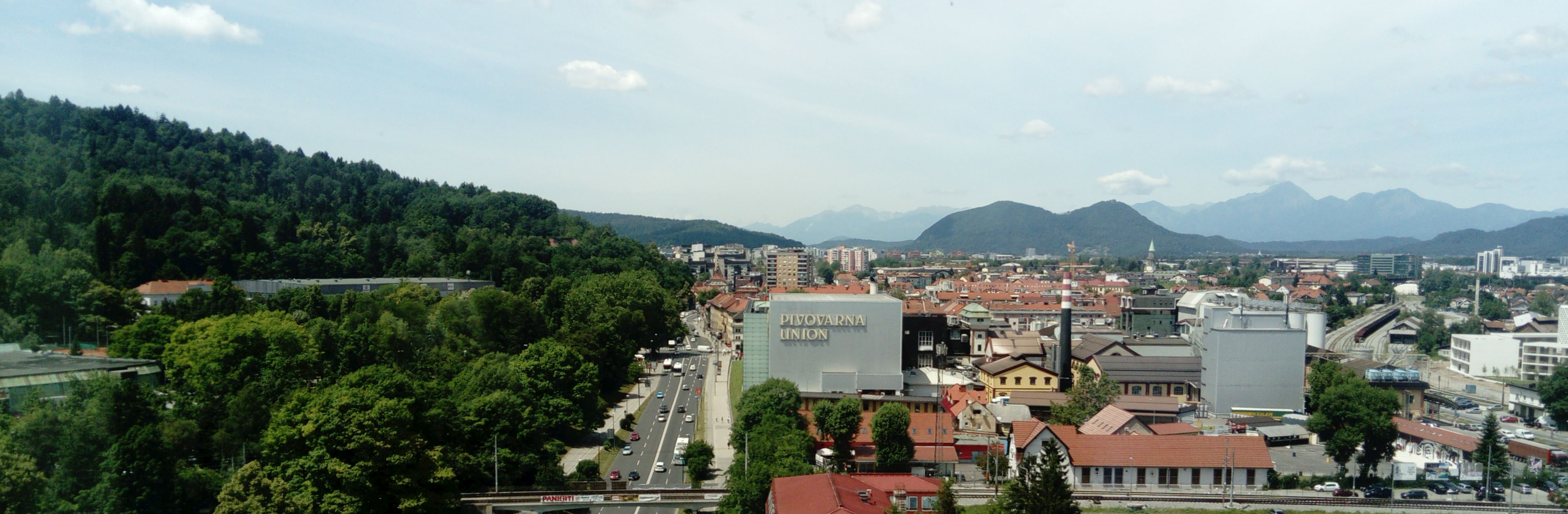
- View of the Šiška District from the Lev Hotel

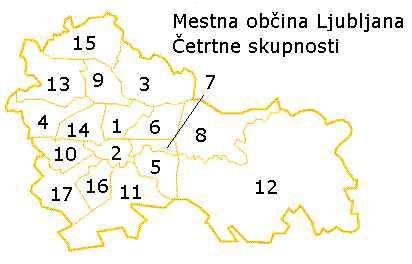
- Map of districts in Ljubljana. The Šiška District is number 14.

- Location in Slovenia
- Coordinates: 46°4′12″N 14°29′11″E
- Country: Slovenia
- Traditional region: Upper Carniola
- Statistical region: Central Slovenia
- Municipality: Ljubljana

Area
  - Total: 7.36 km^{2} (2.84 sq mi)

Population (2014)
  - Total: 34,818

The Šiška District (pronounced [ˈʃiːʃka]; Slovene: Četrtna skupnost Šiška), or simply Šiška, is the most populous district (mestna četrt) of the City Municipality of Ljubljana, the capital of Slovenia. It is named after the former villages of Spodnja Šiška and Zgornja Šiška.

== Geography ==
The Šiška District is bounded on the west A2 Freeway, on the north by the H3 Expressway, on the east by the railroad to Kamnik, and on the south by the railroad to Sežana, a line across Rožnik Hill, and Youth Street (Mladinska ulica). The district includes the former villages of Koseze, Spodnja Šiška, and Zgornja Šiška.

== Cultural heritage ==
Several cultural monuments are located in Šiška, among them St. Bartholomew's Church, built in the 13th century and remodeled between 1933 and 1936 by the Slovene architect Jože Plečnik. Jože Plečnik also designed St. Francis's Church in Šiška. Koseze Pond, part of the Trail of Remembrance and Comradeship, and part of Tivoli Park are located in the Šiška District.
