= Sela pri Dobu =

Sela pri Dobu Sela (until 1953)
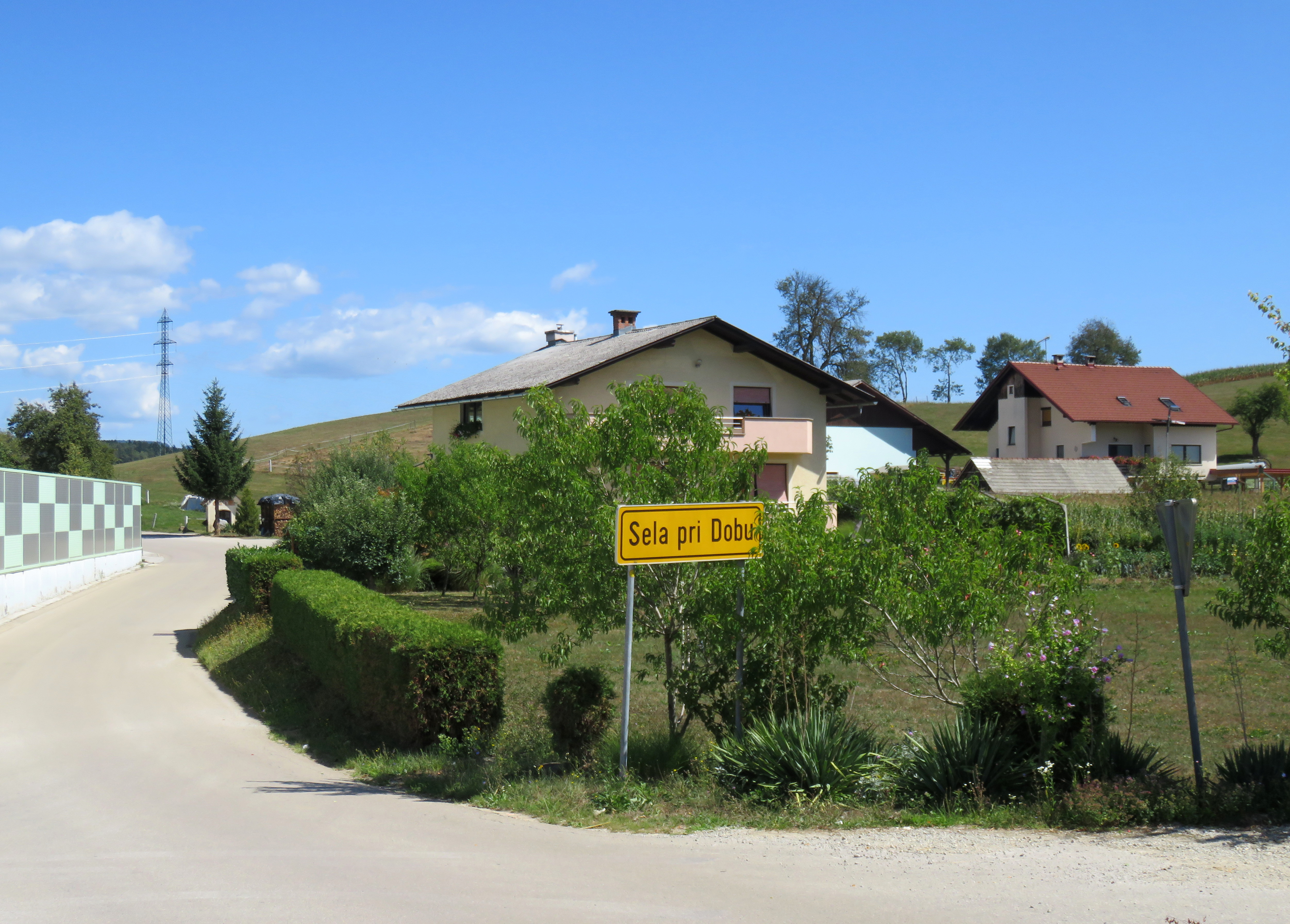

- Location in Slovenia
- Coordinates: 45°55′38.97″N 14°52′6.97″E
- Country: Slovenia
- Traditional region: Lower Carniola
- Statistical region: Central Slovenia
- Municipality: Ivančna Gorica

Area
  - Total: 0.47 km^{2} (0.18 sq mi)
- Elevation: 313.3 m (1,028 ft)

Population (2002)
  - Total: 25

Sela pri Dobu (pronounced [ˈseːla pɾi ˈdoːbu]; German: Selo bei Dob) is a small settlement just south of Dob pri Šentvidu in the Municipality of Ivančna Gorica in central Slovenia. The area is part of the historical region of Lower Carniola. The municipality is now included in the Central Slovenia Statistical Region.

== Name ==
The name of the settlement was changed from Sela to Sela pri Dobu in 1953. In the past the German name was Selo bei Dob.

== Cultural heritage ==
During the construction of the A2 Slovenian motorway south of the settlement in 1996 an archaeological site with continuous Late Bronze Age to Roman period settlement layers was discovered. The site was excavated in 1998 and 1999.
