= Pokojnica =

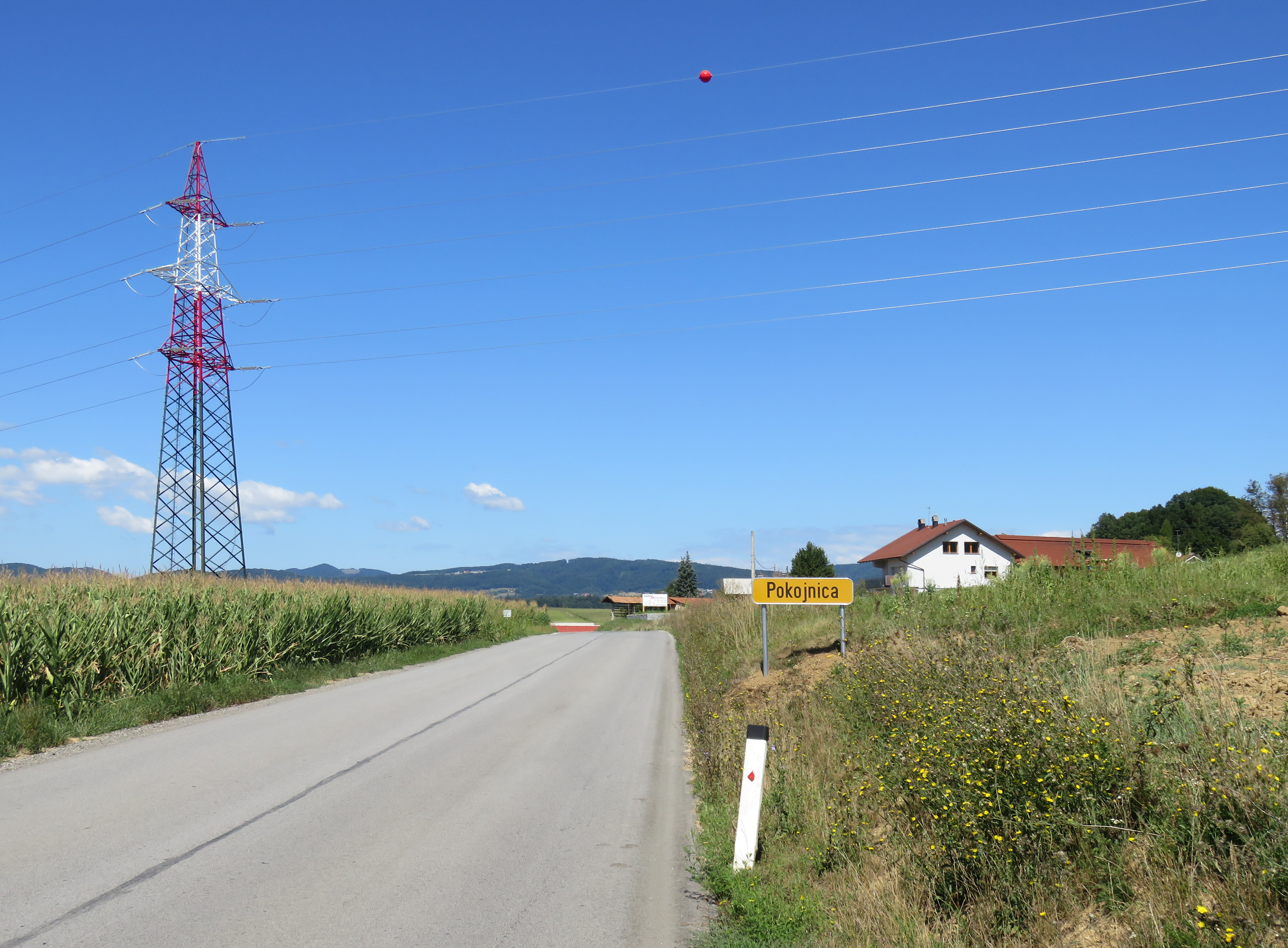

- Location in Slovenia
- Coordinates: 45°55′50.66″N 14°52′37.12″E
- Country: Slovenia
- Traditional region: Lower Carniola
- Statistical region: Central Slovenia
- Municipality: Ivančna Gorica

Area
  - Total: 0.66 km^{2} (0.25 sq mi)
- Elevation: 316.6 m (1,039 ft)

Population (2002)
  - Total: 56

Pokojnica (pronounced [pɔˈkoːjnitsa]) is a small settlement in the Municipality of Ivančna Gorica in central Slovenia. It lies in the historical region of Lower Carniola just east of Dob pri Šentvidu on the regional road leading north from Bič to Litija. The municipality is now included in the Central Slovenia Statistical Region.
