= Zapuže (Ljubljana) =

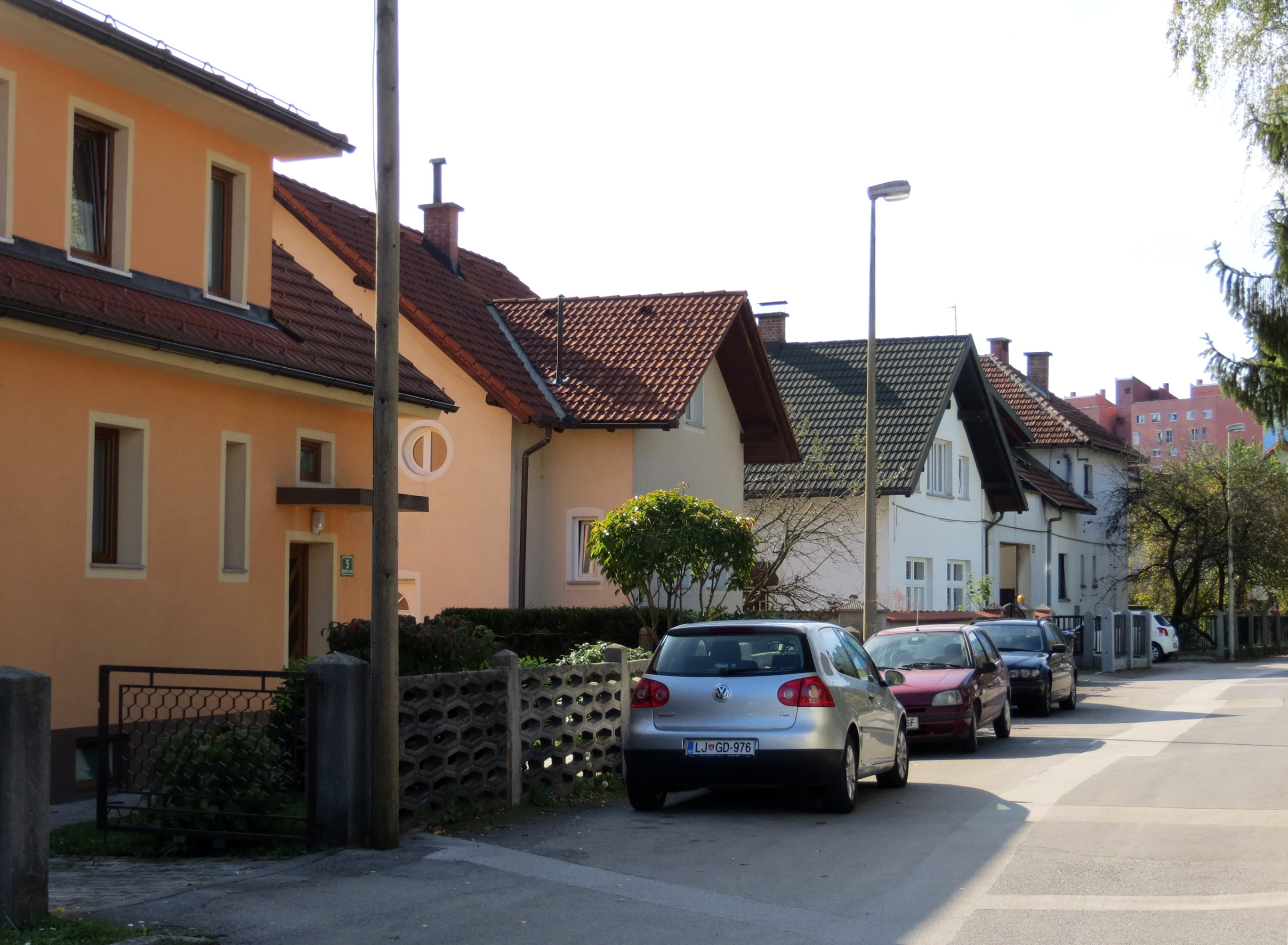

- Location in Slovenia
- Coordinates: 46°5′8.62″N 14°28′23.03″E
- Country: Slovenia
- Traditional region: Upper Carniola
- Statistical region: Central Slovenia
- Municipality: Ljubljana
- Elevation: 312 m (1,024 ft)

Zapuže (pronounced [ˈzaːpuʒɛ]; in older sources also Zapuše, German: Sapusche) is a former settlement in central Slovenia in the northwest part of the capital Ljubljana. It belongs to the Dravlje District of the City Municipality of Ljubljana. It is part of the traditional region of Upper Carniola and is now included with the rest of the municipality in the Central Slovenia Statistical Region.

== Name ==
Zapuže was attested in historical sources as Slepach (probably intending Sepplach) in 1414, Sapoltsach in 1444, and Sapelsach in 1496, all reflecting a locative plural inflection. The name Zapuže occurs several times in Slovenia, along with related forms such as Žapuže and Žabže, and cognate forms are found elsewhere throughout the South Slavic area. It developed from the plural demonym *Zapьlz′ane, probably derived from a fused prepositional phrase such as *za Pьlz′ь, most likely meaning 'behind a (steep) slope'.

== History ==
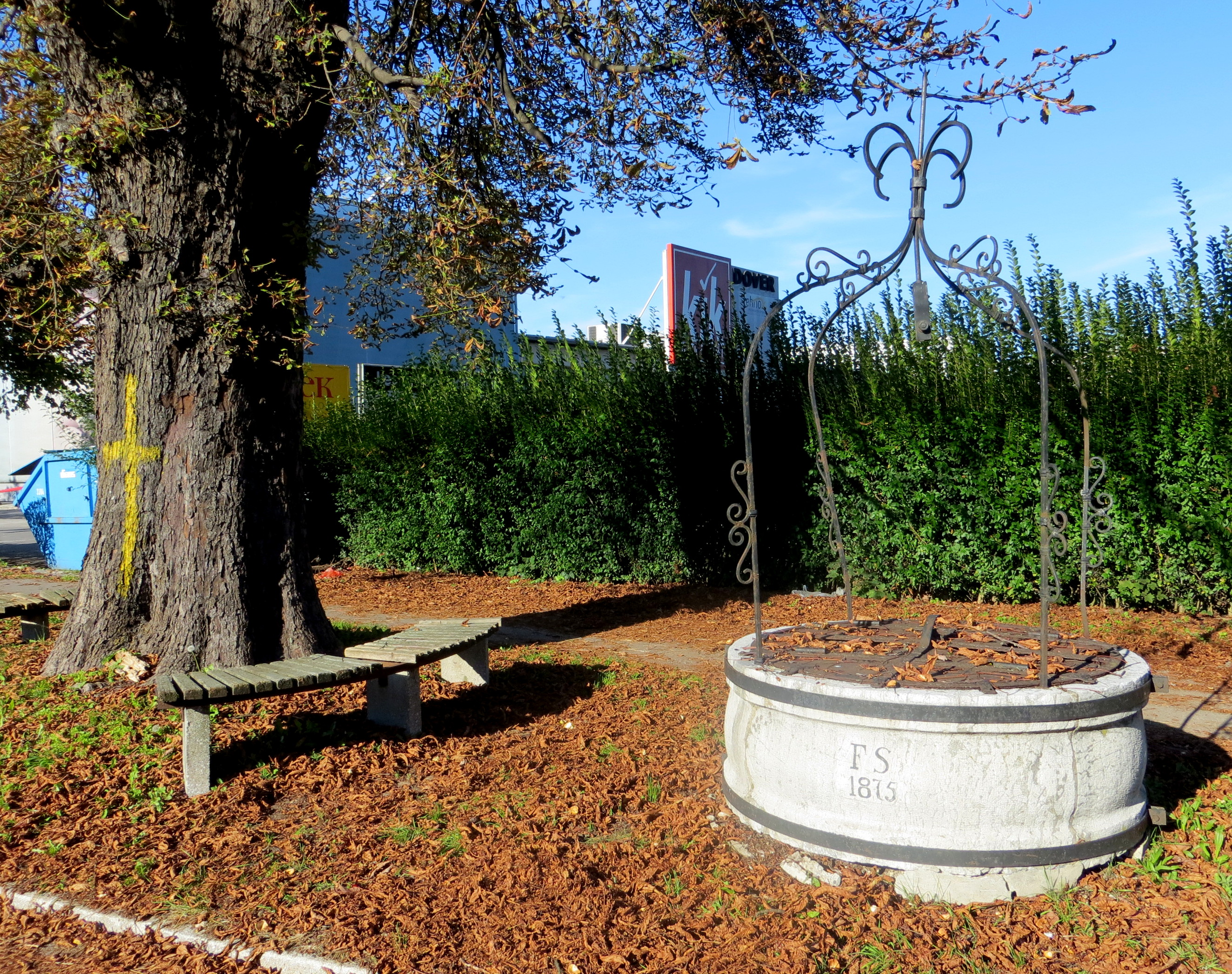
Tree and well from the former Blind John Inn (Pri slepem Janezu)

Zapuže was a small village next to Trata, both in the Parish of Šentvid nad Ljubljano. In the 1900 census it had a population of 168 living in 21 houses, and in the 1931 census 263 people living in 38 houses. By this time it was already more or less a continuous built-up area connecting Šentvid and Dravlje, and it was connected to the Ljubljana tram network. Zapuže was annexed by Šentvid in 1961, ending its existence as an independent settlement. Zapuže later became part of Ljubljana when Šentvid was annexed by Ljubljana in 1974.

The Blind John Inn (Slovene: Pri slepem Janezu) was a landmark of Zapuže. It was damaged in the 1895 Ljubljana earthquake, killing the innkeeper Franc Šušteršič and his wife, and was then damaged in a fire the following year. The inn was razed by the 1980s, when Klagenfurt Street (Celovška cesta) was widened, and the only remnant is a well with the date 1875 and a large chestnut tree.

== Notable people ==
Notable people that were born or lived in Zapuže include the following:

- Stane Kregar (1905–1973), painter
