= Dolnice =

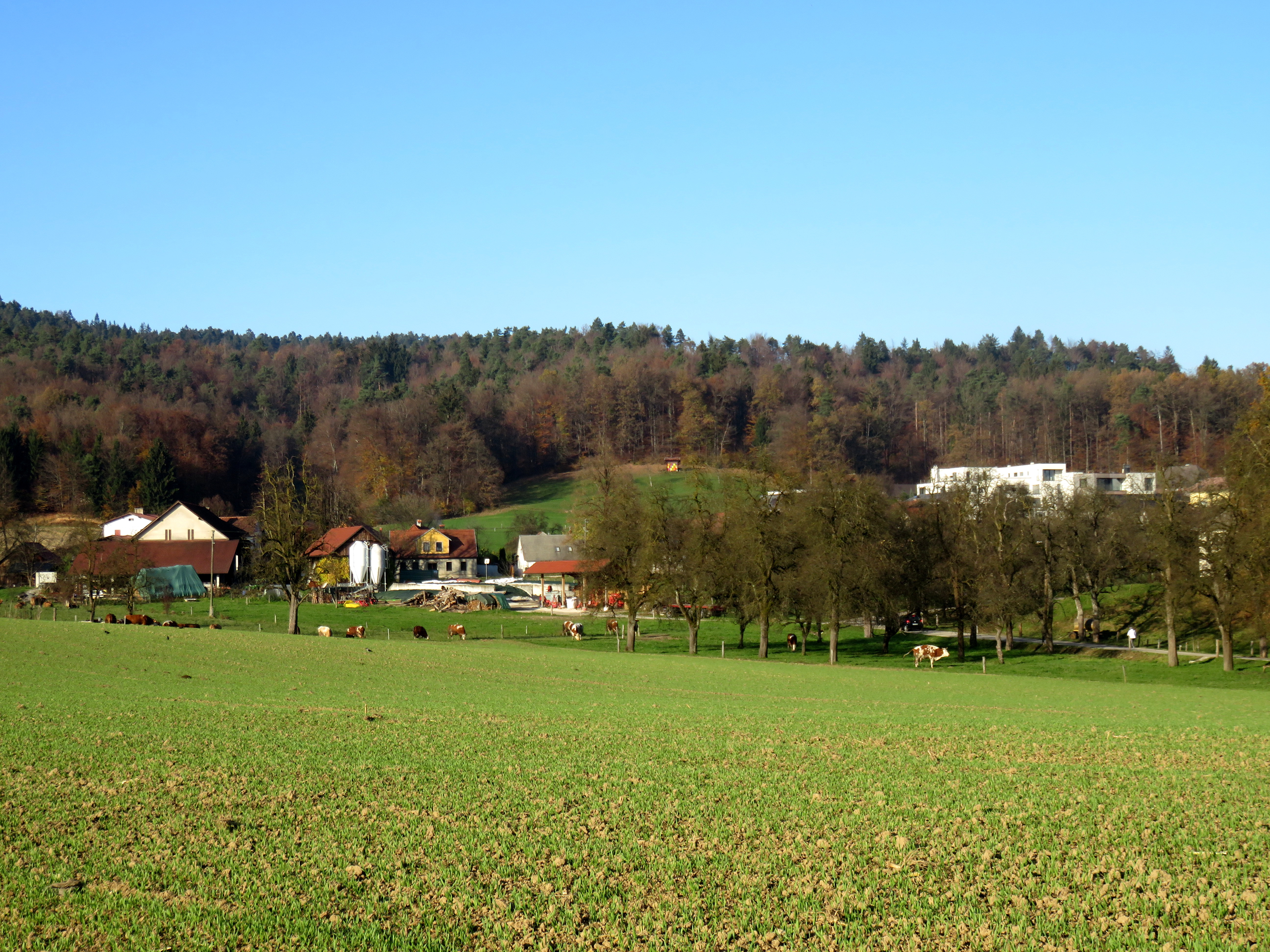

- Location in Slovenia
- Coordinates: 46°4′59″N 14°26′50″E
- Country: Slovenia
- Traditional region: Upper Carniola
- Statistical region: Central Slovenia
- Municipality: Ljubljana
- Elevation: 335 m (1,099 ft)

Dolnice (pronounced [ˈdou̯ːnitsɛ], German: Deunitze) is a former settlement in central Slovenia in the northwest part of the capital Ljubljana. It belongs to the Dravlje District of the City Municipality of Ljubljana. It is part of the traditional region of Upper Carniola and is now included with the rest of the municipality in the Central Slovenia Statistical Region.

== Geography ==
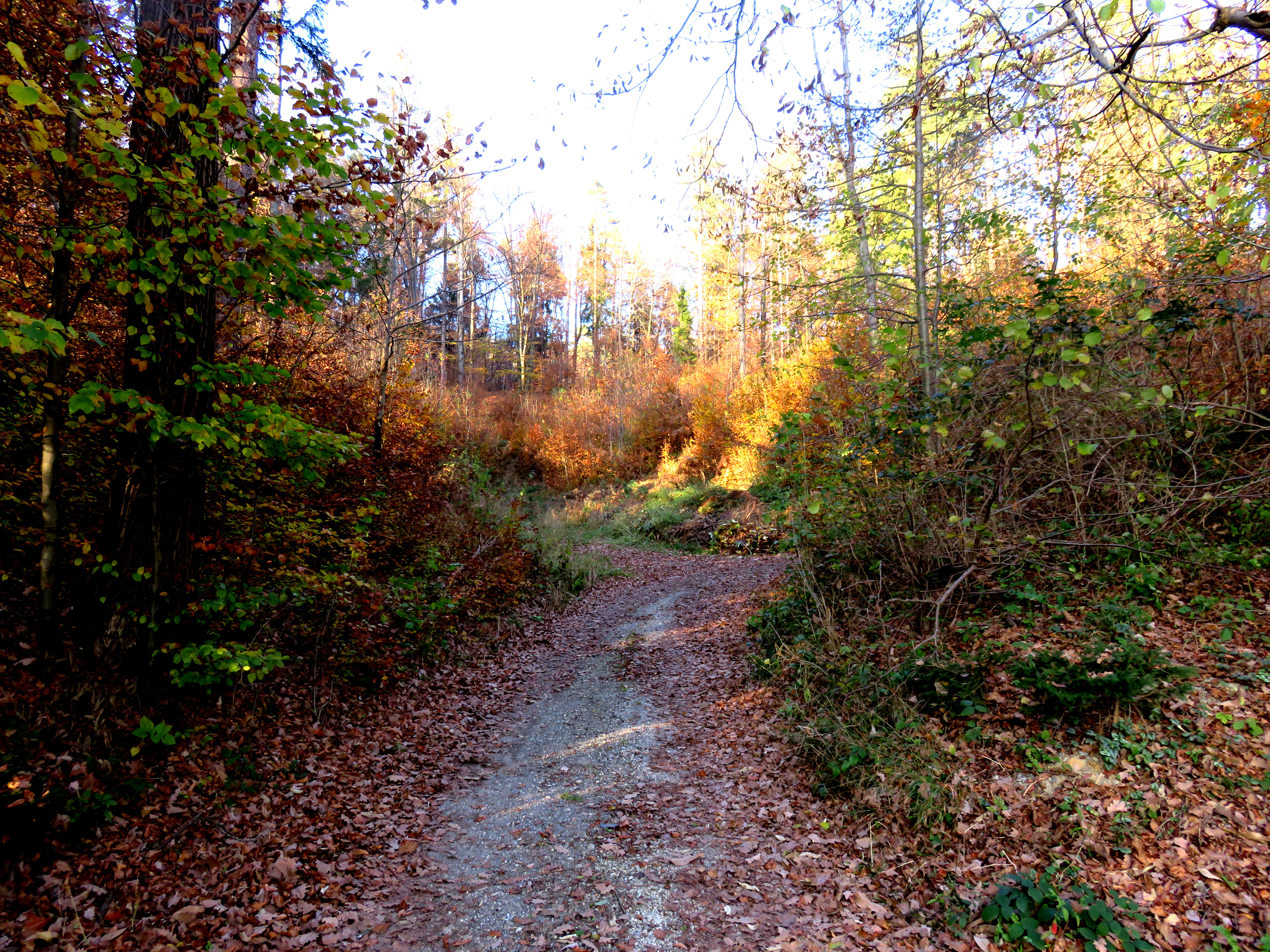
The Šangaj Valley

Dolnice lies southeast of Šentvid between Kamna Gorica and Glinica below the southwest slope of Purkovec Hill (elevation 384 meters or 1,260 feet). The western part of the village is the old farming core of the settlement, and newer houses have been built to the east. The soil is sandy. There is a small valley in the center of the village known as Šangaj.

== Name ==
Dolnice was attested in historical sources as Dolnitz in 1490 and Dolinga in 1496.

== History ==
The remnants of a Roman aqueduct have been discovered in Dolnice. The village had a population of 96 (in 19 houses) in 1931, and a population of 202 (in 36 houses) in 1961. Dolnice was annexed by Ljubljana in 1974, ending its existence as an independent settlement.
