= Godec =

Godec is a surname. In Slovenia, it is an occupational surname meaning "fiddler (musician)".

It is the 140,598th most common surname in the world, with approximately 3,174 individuals with this name.

Notable people with the surname include:

- Alenka Godec (born 1964), Slovenian singer
- Ančka Gošnik Godec (born 1927), Slovenian illustrator
- Jelka Godec Schmidt (born 1958), Slovenian illustrator and writer
- Jernej Godec (born 1986), Slovenian swimmer
- Robert F. Godec (born 1956), American diplomat

Table of popularity
| Place | No. People | Frequency | Popularity rank In area |
|---|---|---|---|
| Slovenia | 1,388 | 1:1,792 | 160 |
| United States | 750 | 1:483,279 | 40,870 |
| France | 647 | 1:102,663 | 15,097 |
| Croatia | 132 | 1:32,035 | 6,563 |
| Austria | 76 | 1:112,045 | 15,874 |
