= Podgora (Ljubljana) =

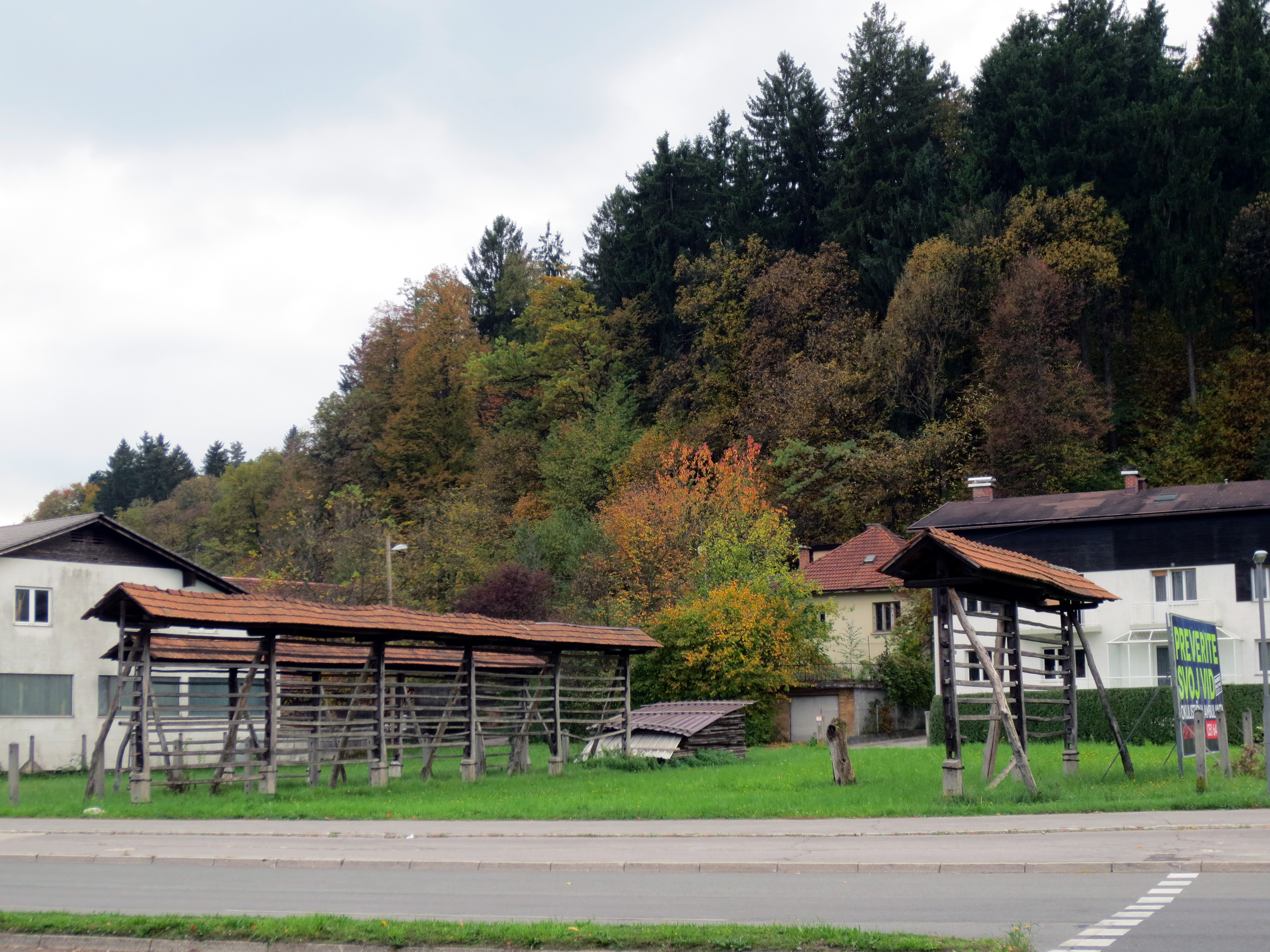

- Location in Slovenia
- Coordinates: 46°5′29.38″N 14°28′5.41″E
- Country: Slovenia
- Traditional region: Upper Carniola
- Statistical region: Central Slovenia
- Municipality: Ljubljana
- Elevation: 315 m (1,033 ft)

Podgora (pronounced [pɔdˈɡɔːɾa]) is a former settlement in central Slovenia in the northwest part of the capital Ljubljana. It belongs to the Šentvid District of the City Municipality of Ljubljana. It is part of the traditional region of Upper Carniola and is now included with the rest of the municipality in the Central Slovenia Statistical Region.

== Geography ==
Podgora lies south of Šentvid, between Klagenfurt Street (Celovška cesta) and Gradišče Hill (441 m) along the old road to Pržan. A creek rises from a spring above the village and follows a ditch along the main road, where much residential housing was built after the Second World War.

== Name ==
Podgora was attested in historical sources as vnder dem perg ... in sand Veits pharr in 1414, zum Perg, in 1453 and vntterm Perg in 1496, among other spellings. The name Podgora is a fused prepositional phrase that has lost its case inflection (from pod 'below' + gora 'mountain'), literally meaning 'below the mountain'. Place names like Podgora (e.g., Podgorica, Podgorje) are relatively common in Slovenia.

== History ==
Podgora was annexed by Šentvid in 1961, ending its existence as an independent settlement. The Megrad factory, which produced industrial furnaces, was established in Podgrad in 1963. There was also a hatchery for the Emona company in the village. Podgora became part of Ljubljana when Šentvid was annexed by Ljubljana in 1974.

== Notable people ==
Notable people that were born or lived in Podgora include:

- Vinko Bitenc (1895–1956), writer
- Anton Knez (1856–1892), merchant
- Ivan Knez (1853–1926), merchant
- Ivanka Ribič, née Rožmanc (1895–1980), singer
