= Dragica Legat Košmerl =

Slovenian zither player and composer (1883–1956)

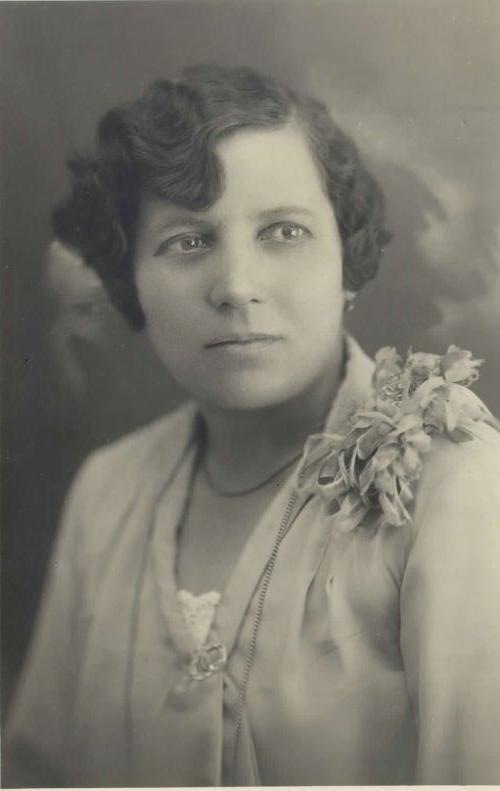
- Dragica in the 1920s
- Born: Karolina Legat Košmerl; 29 October 1883; Ljubljana, Austria-Hungary
- Died: 1 September 1956 (aged 72); Ljubljana, Yugoslavia
- Other name: Dragica Legat Košmerl
- Occupations: Zither player, zither teacher, composer

Karolina Legat Košmerl, also known as Dragica Legat Košmerl, (29 October 1883 – 1 September 1956) was a Slovenian zither player, zither teacher, and composer. She is considered the most important Slovenian zither player and educator in mid-1900s.

== Childhood ==
She was born into a Slovenian family on 29 October 1883 in the Spodnja Šiška area of Ljubljana. (Note: She was also known by the names Karla and Draga, and by the surname Legat Košmerlj.) Her mother, Leopolda Korošec, rented out rooms, and her father, Franc Legat, was a clerk. Her mother came from Kranj, and her father from Zasip; a few months before her birth they moved to Ljubljana. She attended the five-grade municipal German language girls' elementary school in Ljubljana.

== Work ==
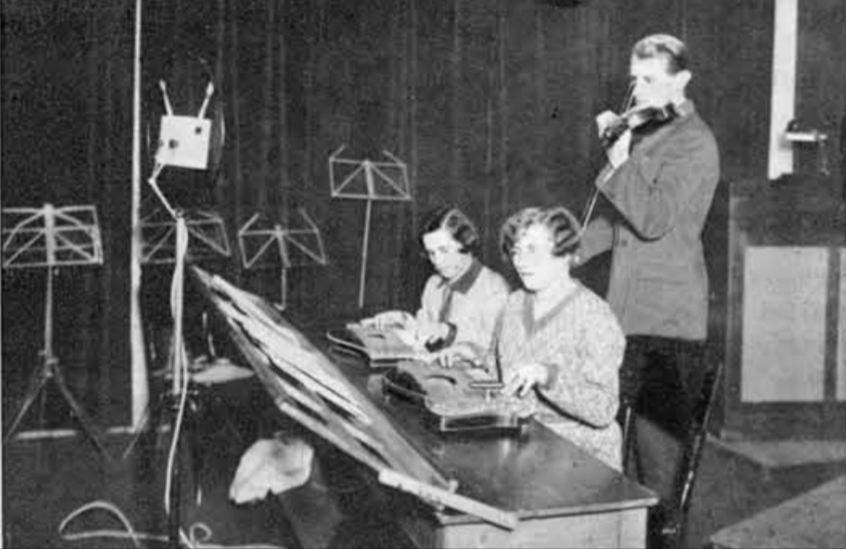
Dragica Legat Košmerl (centre) performing with a trio on Radio Ljubljana in 1929.

In 1899 she began working as a zither teacher, which she did throughout her life. For the next five decades she taught the zither privately as well as in schools. She devoted herself in particular to teaching children that were blind or deaf-mute. She also composed works for the zither. She arranged many Slovenian folk songs, as well as some classical works, for the zither. On 28 November 1907 she married Janez Košmerl - Janko (1880–1961), a railway clerk and amateur accordionist from Sodražica. She dedicated several of her compositions to him. They had five children, of whom four died in childhood. After several moves, in 1915 she and her family settled in an apartment in Ljubljana. When Radio Ljubljana, the first Slovene radio station, began operating in 1928, she became an active contributor and performed frequently on the radio, most often in a trio with another zither player and a violinist. She sometimes performed in a duo with her husband as well. In 1929 she published a book of sheet music, Pozdrav slovenskim citrarjem! (Greetings to Slovene Zither Players!). In 1952 she published a zither textbook with sheet music: Šola za citre (Zither School). This was the second Slovene zither textbook (the first was published in 1907), and the only Slovene zither teaching material published between 1936 and 1989, until Cita Galič published a new zither school in 1990. In the book she paid special attention to tuning the zither. Some movements, for example changing strings, correct finger placement, and hand position, are also shown graphically in the book. The book also includes pieces she arranged for the zither as well as her original compositions. The book is still included in the Slovenian (Republic of Slovenia) educational programme for the zither subject in music schools.

== Later life and death ==
In the 1930s, enthusiasm for the zither in Slovenia faded. After the Second World War, the zither had to withdraw from music schools into private settings, as it was said not to be "socialist" enough. Dragica Legat Košmerl therefore taught only privately after 1945. She died on 1 September 1956 in Ljubljana.

== Draga Košmerl Award ==
An award named after her, the Draga Košmerl Award, is presented annually by the Zither Society of Slovenia (Citrarsko društvo Slovenije). The recipient receives the Draga Košmerl recognition for outstanding work in the teaching of the zither, writing teaching materials, researching the history of zither playing, and organizing zither events and projects. Only Slovenian citizens or Slovenian organizations may receive the recognition. An individual may receive it more than once.

== Bibliography ==
- Pozdrav slovenskim citrarjem! (Greetings to Slovene Zither Players!; sheet music, 1929, Ljubljana, Hinko Sevar antiquarian bookshop/bookstore)
- Šola za citre (Zither School; textbook and sheet music, 1952, Ljubljana, self-published)
