= Ančka Gošnik Godec =

Slovene illustrator (1927–2025)

- Born: 5 June 1927; Celje, Slovenia
- Died: March 15, 2025 (aged 97)
- Resting place: Dravlje Cemetery
- Education: Academy of Fine Arts, Ljubljana
- Known for: drawing, illustrating
- Notable work: Children's books illustrations
- Awards: Levstik Award; 2001 for lifetime achievement

Ančka Gošnik Godec (5 June 1927 – 15 March 2025) was a Slovene illustrator. She illustrated over 120 children's books as well as school textbooks.

== Life ==
Gošnik Godec was born in Celje in 1927. She studied at the Academy of Fine Arts in Ljubljana and lived and worked in Ljubljana. She began her career by contributing illustrations to children's magazines such as Ciciban and other youth publications, before becoming widely known for her work in children's literature. Among her most notable illustrations are those for the popular Slovene story Muca Copatarica, as well as numerous folk tales and fairy tale collections that became part of Slovenia’s cultural heritage. She won the Levstik Award for her illustrations twice, in 1960 and 1964, as well as the same award for lifetime achievement in illustration in 2001. She was also nominated for the Hans Christian Andersen Award.

== Death ==
She died in March 2025, at the age of 97.
