= Glinica (Ljubljana) =

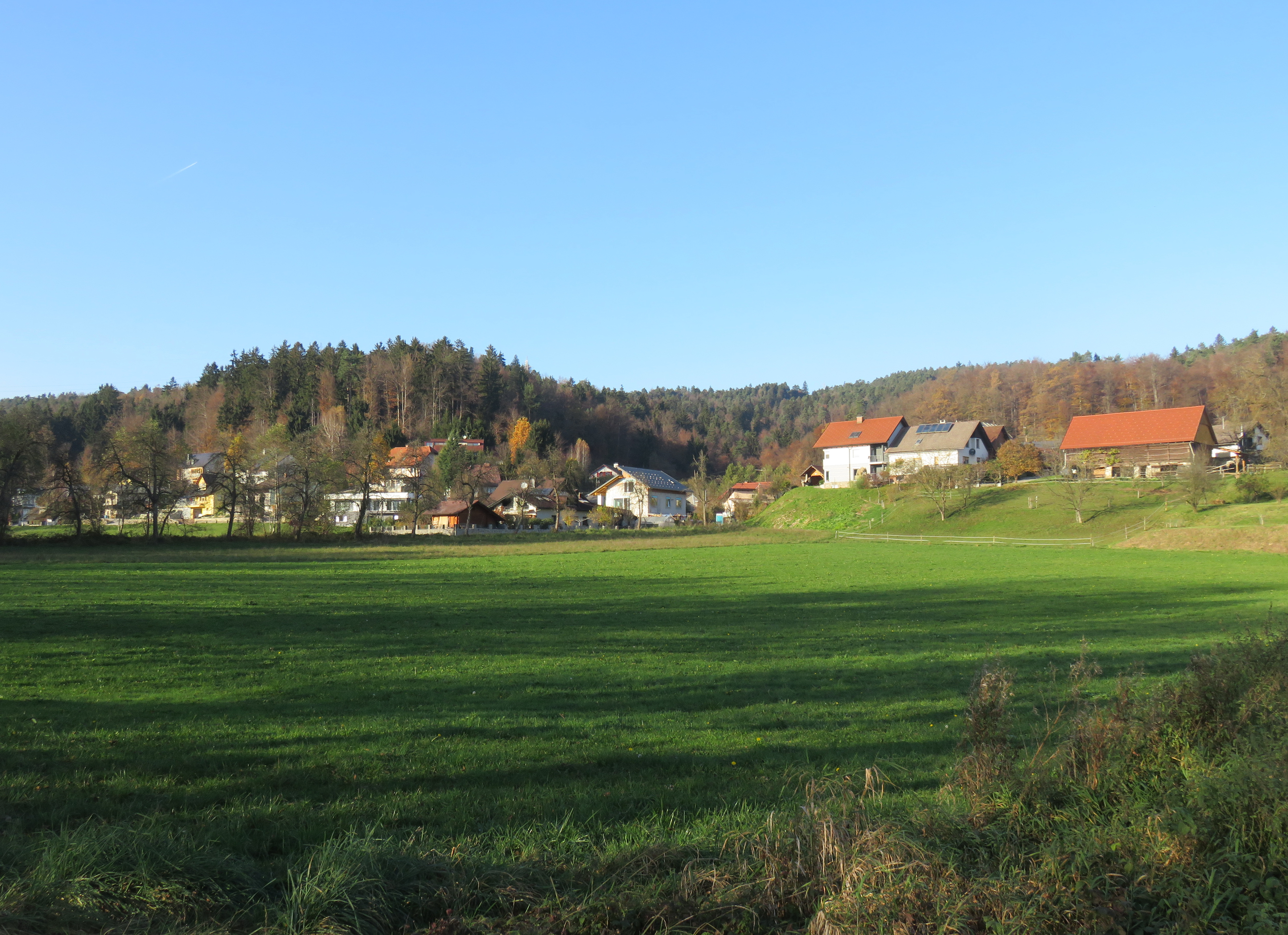

- Location in Slovenia
- Coordinates: 46°5′0.72″N 14°26′31.02″E
- Country: Slovenia
- Traditional region: Upper Carniola
- Statistical region: Central Slovenia
- Municipality: Ljubljana
- Elevation: 336 m (1,102 ft)

Glinica (pronounced [ˈɡliːnitsa], often Glince, German: Gleinitz or Gleinitz bei Draule) is a former settlement in central Slovenia in the northwest part of the capital Ljubljana. It belongs to the Dravlje District of the City Municipality of Ljubljana. It is part of the traditional region of Upper Carniola and is now included with the rest of the municipality in the Central Slovenia Statistical Region.

== Geography ==
Glinica is a scattered settlement mostly along the left bank of Glinščica Creek and the road from Šentvid to Dobrova. Nearby elevations include Black Peak (Slovene: Črni vrh, 483 m) to the north and Planjava Hill and Krasje Hill to the west. The soil in the valley is loamy, becoming sandy and stony at higher elevations. The Big Brezar Shaft (Veliko Brezarjevo brezno) and Little Brezar Shaft (Malo Brezarjevo brezno) lie above the village. Water is supplied to Ljubljana from Glinica via Šentvid.

== Name ==
Glinica was attested in historical sources as Gleynicz in 1368, Sandt Anthoni in 1421, and Glinitz in 1498, among other spellings. The name Glinica is derived from the Slavic common noun *glinьnica 'clay pit', based on the word glina 'clay'. It therefore refers to the local geography. The local name Glince (originally an accusative plural) is also used for the settlement. The settlement was known as Gleinitz or Gleinitz bei Draule in German in the past.

== History ==
Archaeological finds indicate that Glinica was settled in antiquity. After the Second World War, the Big Brezar Shaft above the village was used to dispose of 800 bodies (Slovene and Croatian prisoners of war, and male and female civilians) of people murdered at the end of May 1945. The corpses were later disinterred and moved to the Kucja Valley in June 1945. Glinica was annexed by the city of Ljubljana in 1974, ending its existence as an independent settlement.

The population of Glinica remained steady for much of the 20th century, with a population of 143 people living in 23 houses in the 1900 census, 136 people in 22 houses in 1931, and 137 people in 32 houses in 1961.

== Church ==
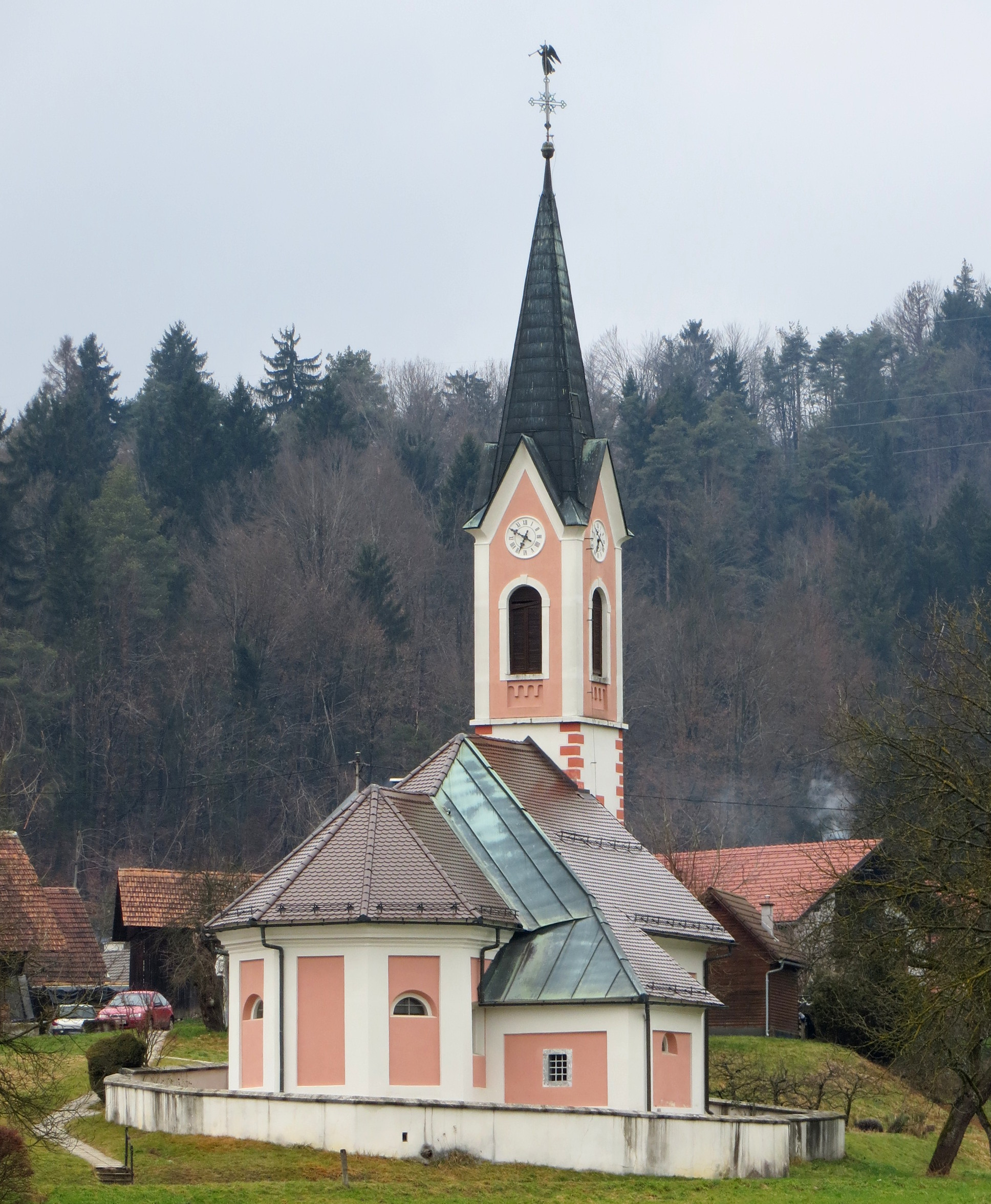
Saint Anthony's Church

The local church in Glinica is a chapel of ease dedicated to Saint Anthony. It was mentioned in written sources as early as 1526. The side altar and pulpit date from circa 1860. The Stations of the Cross in the church are 19th-century paintings on glass.

== Glinica Manor ==
Southwest of the village core of Glinica are the remnants of Glinica Manor (Slovene: graščina Glince). Investigations at the site in 2007 yielded building material, pottery, and other small finds from a manor that was built in the 18th century and fell into ruin between the two world wars. An older manor was mentioned at the site in 1378.
