= Kamna Gorica (Ljubljana) =

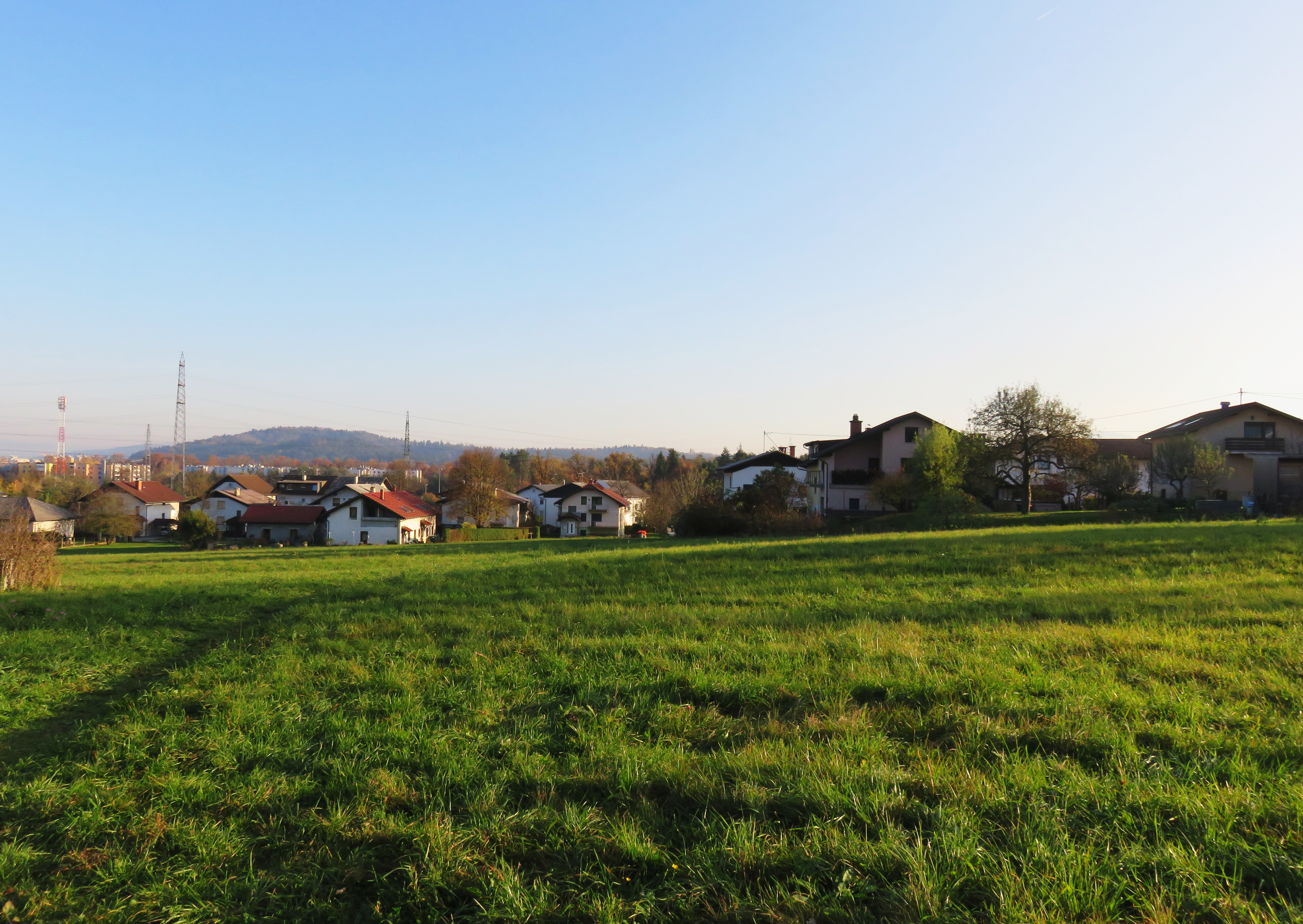

- Location in Slovenia
- Coordinates: 46°4′41.53″N 14°27′19.34″E
- Country: Slovenia
- Traditional region: Upper Carniola
- Statistical region: Central Slovenia
- Municipality: Ljubljana
- Elevation: 326 m (1,070 ft)

Kamna Gorica (pronounced [ˈkaːmna ɡɔˈɾiːtsa], German: Kamnagoritza) is a former settlement in central Slovenia in the northwest part of the capital Ljubljana. It belongs to the Dravlje District of the City Municipality of Ljubljana. It is part of the traditional region of Upper Carniola and is now included with the rest of the municipality in the Central Slovenia Statistical Region.

== Geography ==
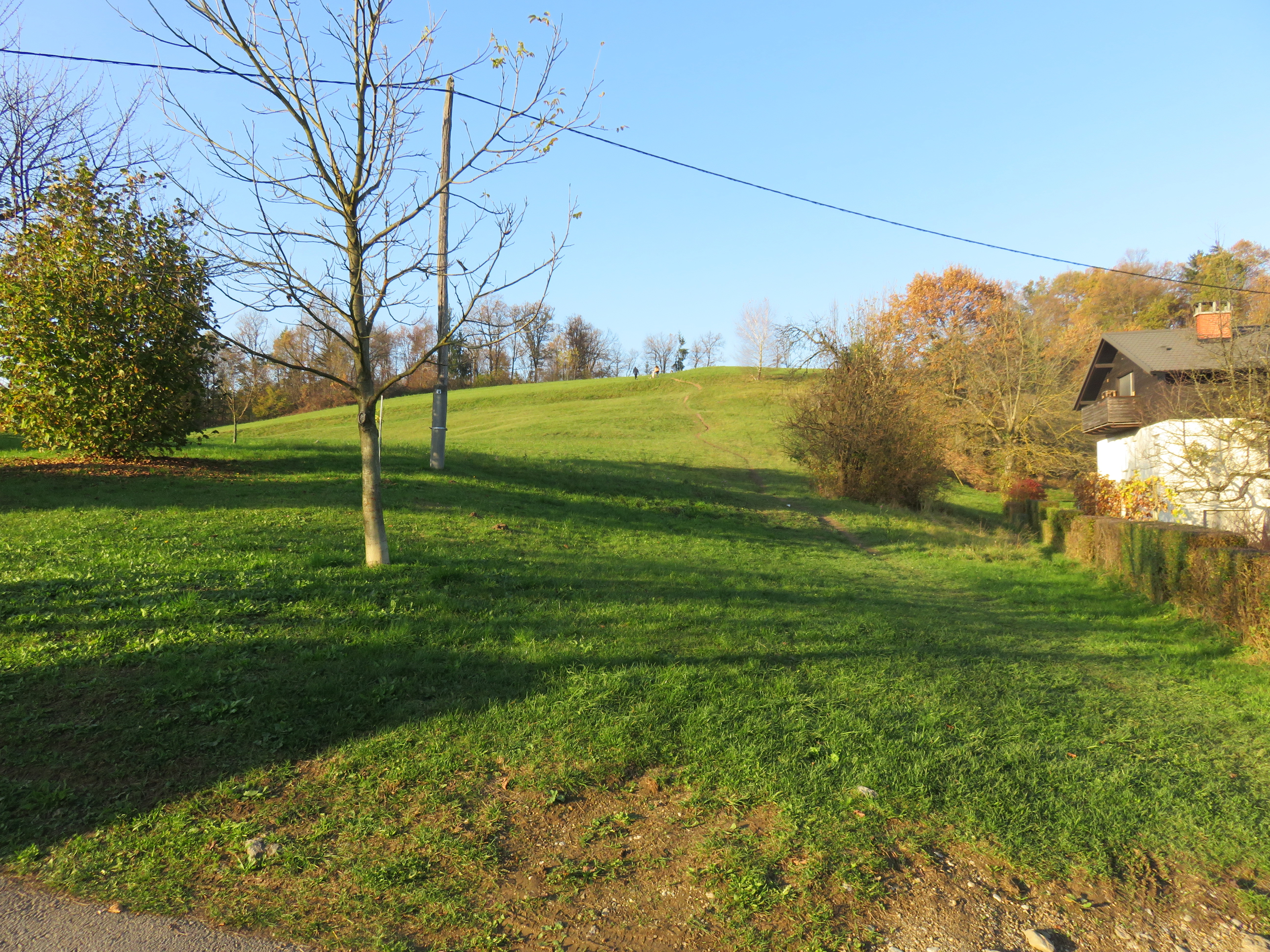
The south slope of Stone Hill (Kamna gorica) in Kamna Gorica

Kamna Gorica lies southeast of Šentvid near Dolnice on a low terrace below Stone Hill (Kamna gorica, elevation 354 meters or 1,161 feet), which is composed of limestone and dolomite and where there is a very old limestone quarry. The soil is partly loamy and partly sandy. The source of Zlatek Creek, which flows toward Podutik and is a tributary of the Glinščica, lies in the village commons.

== Name ==
Kamna Gorica was attested in historical sources as Stainpuhel in 1427 and Camengorici in 1498, among other spellings.

== History ==
The smaller eastern part of Kamna Gorica (five houses with 15 people) was annexed by the City of Ljubljana in 1935. The remainder of the village had a population of 80 (in 14 houses) in 1931, and a population of 101 (in 16 houses) in 1961. This was also annexed by Ljubljana in 1974, ending the existence of Kamna Gorica as an independent settlement.

== Cultural heritage ==
The spring that feeds Zlatek Creek, known as Golden Spring (Zlati studenec) or Roman Spring (Rimski vrelec), was one of the sources for the northwest Emona aqueduct. This area and the course of the former aqueduct has been registered as an archaeological site dating to the Roman era.
