= Poljane (Šentvid District) =

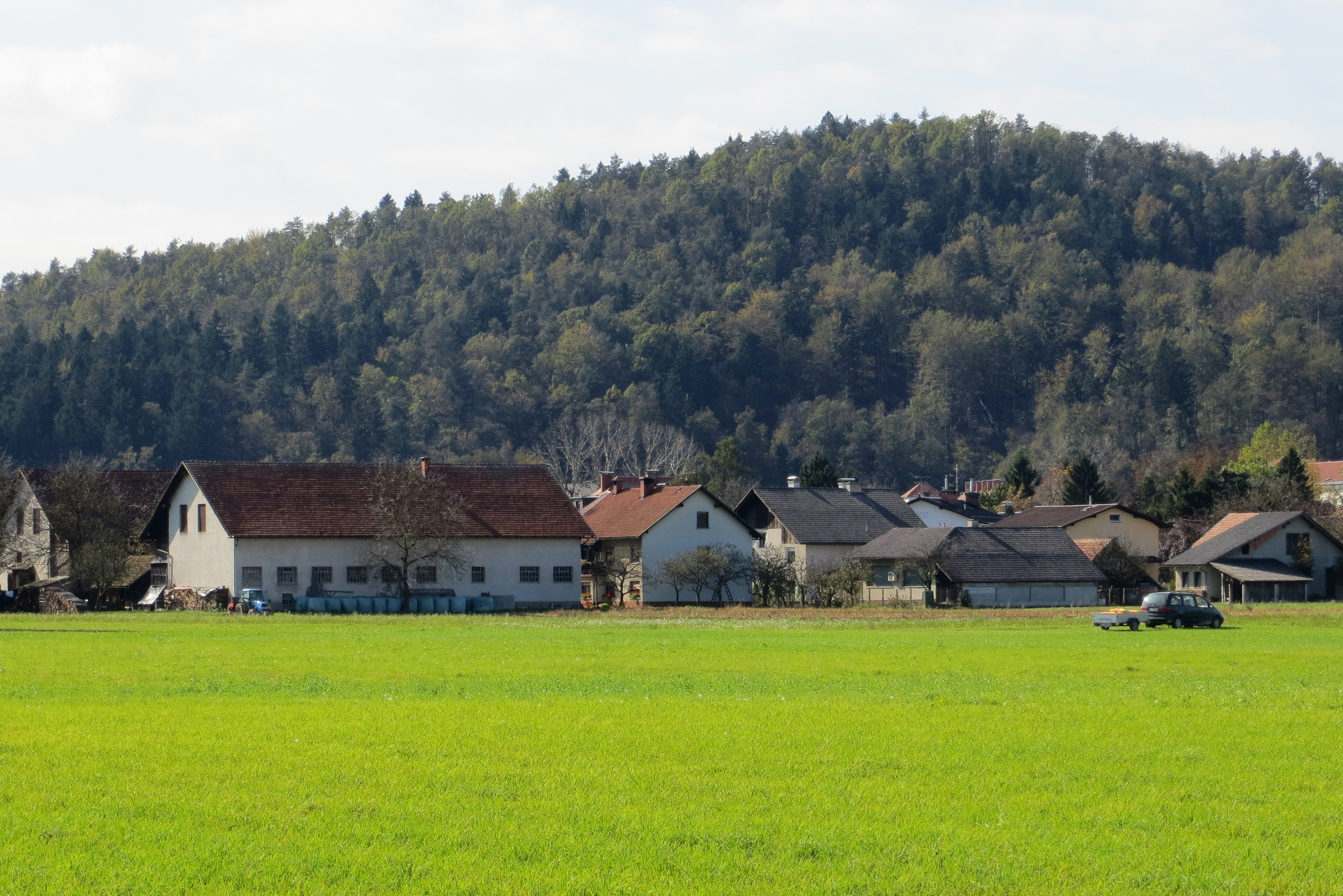

- Location in Slovenia
- Coordinates: 46°5′44.36″N 14°28′23.65″E
- Country: Slovenia
- Traditional region: Upper Carniola
- Statistical region: Central Slovenia
- Municipality: Ljubljana
- Elevation: 311 m (1,020 ft)

Poljane (pronounced [ˈpoːljanɛ], German: Polane) is a former settlement in central Slovenia in the northwest part of the capital Ljubljana. It belongs to the Šentvid District of the City Municipality of Ljubljana. It is part of the traditional region of Upper Carniola and is now included with the rest of the municipality in the Central Slovenia Statistical Region.

== Geography ==
Poljane consists of a cluster of houses on the east side of the railroad from Ljubljana to Jesenice.

== Name ==
The name Poljane (usually with stress on the second syllable) is probably derived from a plural form of the common noun poljana 'large field' (< polje 'field'). It may also be based on the demonym *Poľane (literally, 'field dwellers'), also derived from polje 'field'.

== History ==
In the 1931 census, Poljane had 137 people living in 26 houses. By this time it was already more or less a continuous built-up area with Šentvid. The Agrostroj Indos foundry (formerly the Pajk factory) operated in Poljane from 1936 onward, also casting ductile iron after the Second World War. After the war there was extensive construction in Poljane. Poljane was annexed by Šentvid in 1961, ending its existence as an independent settlement. Poljane later became part of Ljubljana when Šentvid was annexed by Ljubljana in 1974.
