= Šentvid District =

Šentvid District Četrtna skupnost Šentvid
- District
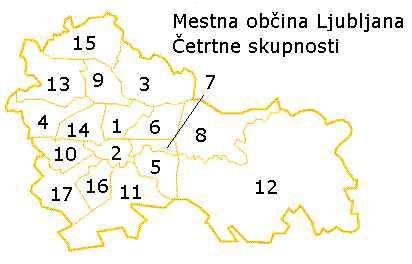
- Map of districts in Ljubljana. The Šentvid District is number 13.

- Location in Slovenia
- Coordinates: 46°5′50″N 14°27′59″E
- Country: Slovenia
- Traditional region: Upper Carniola
- Statistical region: Central Slovenia
- Municipality: Ljubljana

Area
  - Total: 15.83 km^{2} (6.11 sq mi)

Population (2014)
  - Total: 14,025

The Šentvid District (pronounced [ʃɛntˈʋiːt]; Slovene: Četrtna skupnost Šentvid), or simply Šentvid, is a district (mestna četrt) of the City Municipality of Ljubljana, the capital of Slovenia. It is named after the former village of Šentvid.

== Geography ==
The Šentvid District is bounded on the west by a line running through the Polhov Gradec Hills, on the north by the Sava River, on the east by a line through farmland east of the A2 Freeway, and on the south by Stegne Street, Jože Jama Street (Ulica Jožeta Jama), Pečnik Street (Pečnikova ulica), Trata Street (Na Trati), Zapuže Street (Zapuška Cesta), and Kamna Gorica Street (Kamnogoriška cesta). The district includes the former settlements of Brod, Podgora, Poljane, Pržan, Šentvid, Trata, and Vižmarje.
