= Podutik =

- Location in Slovenia
- Coordinates: 46°4′24.65″N 14°27′1.11″E
- Country: Slovenia
- Traditional region: Upper Carniola
- Statistical region: Central Slovenia
- Municipality: Ljubljana
- Elevation: 315 m (1,033 ft)

Podutik (pronounced [pɔduˈtiːk], in older sources also Utik or Pod Utikom) is a former settlement in central Slovenia in the northwest part of the capital Ljubljana. It belongs to the Dravlje District of the City Municipality of Ljubljana. It is part of the traditional region of Upper Carniola and is now included with the rest of the municipality in the Central Slovenia Statistical Region.

== Geography ==
Podutik lies south of Kamna Gorica and west of Koseze. It was originally a ribbon village along the road to Dobrova, but much housing has been built south of the old village center since 1967. Prevalnik Hill (elevation 378 meters or 1,240 feet) rises to the west, Strmica Hill (384 meters or 1,260 feet) to the north, and Lookout Peak (Stražni vrh, 439 meters or 1,440 feet) to the south. The former village included the hamlets of Grič and Na Opekarni (also known as Smodikovec). The soil is loamy and there are fields to the southwest.

== Name ==
Podutik was attested in historical sources as Luttich in 1178, Weytichk in 1312, and Wittikh in 1421, among other spellings. In older modern sources, the names Utik and Pod Utikom are found. The name Podutik is a fused prepositional phrase that has lost case inflection, from pod 'below' + Utik, referring to Utik Hill (elevation 441 meters or 1,447 feet) to the southwest.

== History ==
A brickworks was established in the hamlet of Na Opekarni (literally, 'at the brickworks') in 1961. Podutik was annexed by the City of Ljubljana in two stages, in 1974 and 1982, ending its existence as an independent settlement.

== Church ==
The parish church in Podutik stands on the northeast end of the former village, north of Podutik Street (Podutiška cesta). It is dedicated to the Feast of Corpus Christi (Slovene: Sveto rešnje telo). Construction of the church started in 2000, and it was consecrated in 2005.

== Notable people ==
Notable people that were born or lived in Podutik include:

- Alojzij Vodnik (1868–1939), stone cutter
- Anton Vodnik (1901–1965), poet
- France Vodnik (1903–1986), poet, translator, and essayist
