= Leščevje =

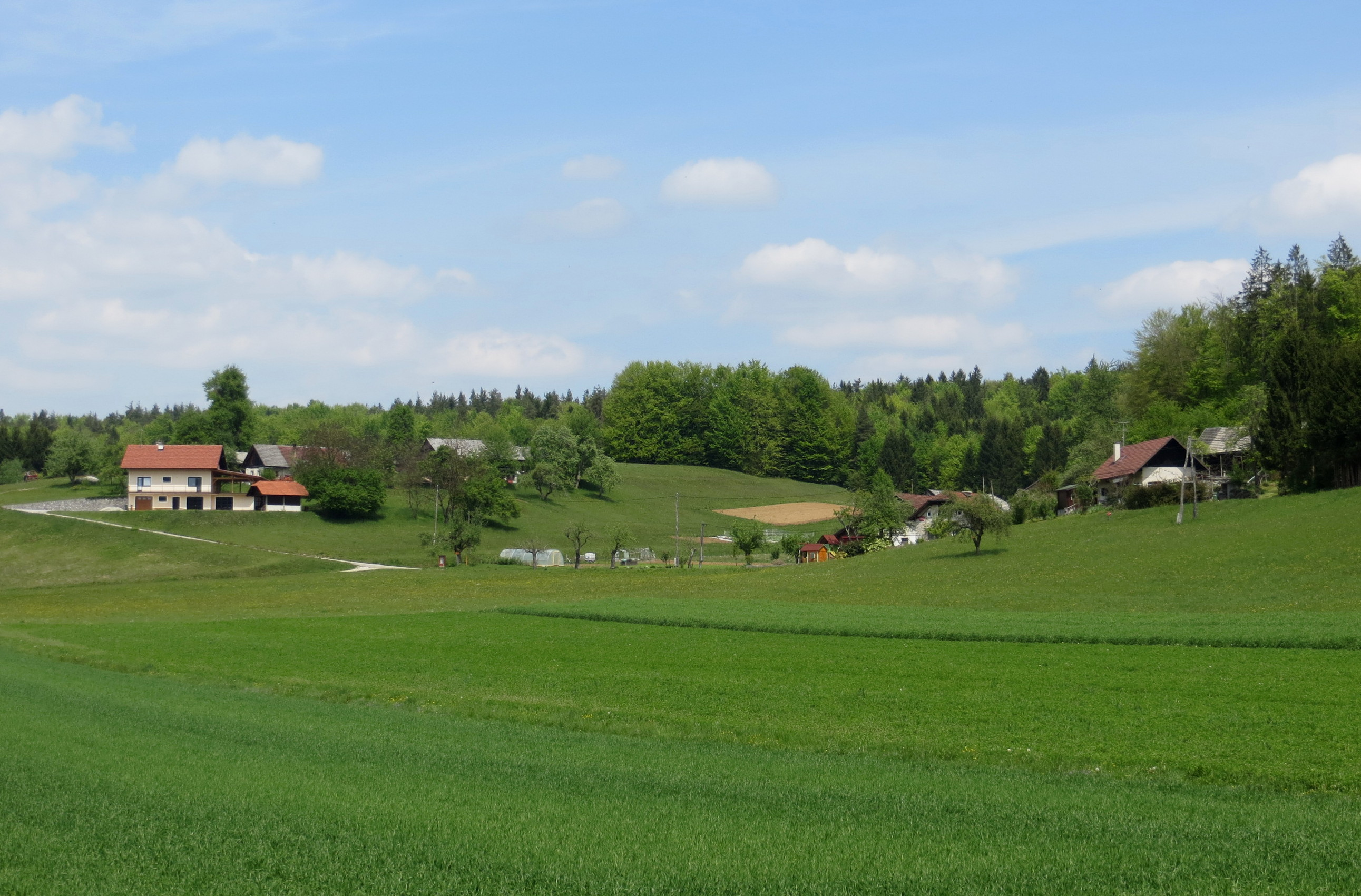

- Location in Slovenia
- Coordinates: 45°54′57.37″N 14°47′4.02″E
- Country: Slovenia
- Traditional region: Lower Carniola
- Statistical region: Central Slovenia
- Municipality: Ivančna Gorica

Area
  - Total: 2.56 km^{2} (0.99 sq mi)
- Elevation: 364.2 m (1,195 ft)

Population (2002)
  - Total: 50

Leščevje (pronounced [ˈleːʃtʃɛwjɛ]; German: Leschuje) is a settlement in the hills west of Muljava in the Municipality of Ivančna Gorica in central Slovenia. The area is part of the historical region of Lower Carniola. The municipality is now included in the Central Slovenia Statistical Region.

== Church ==
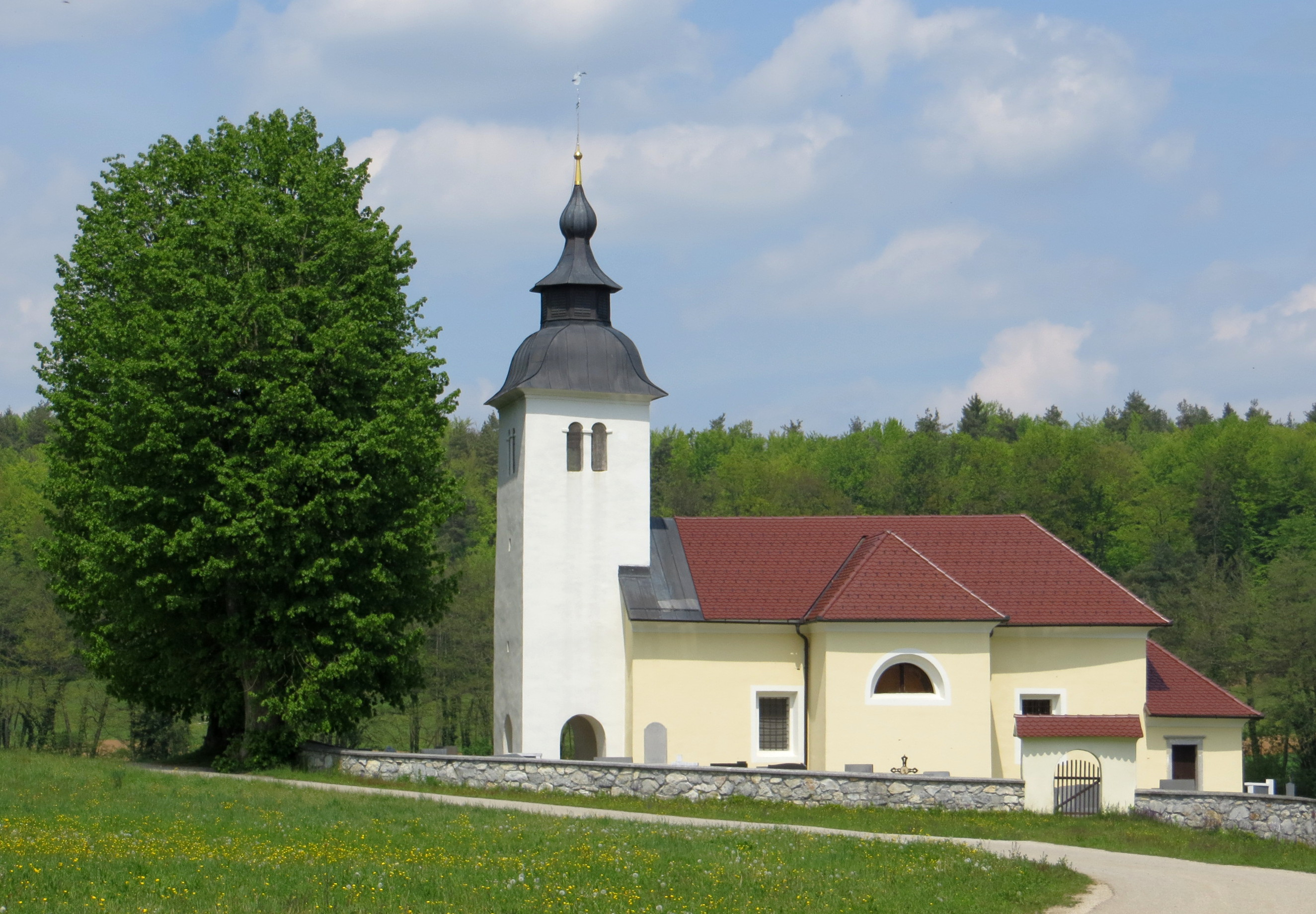
Saint John the Baptist Church

The local church in the settlement is dedicated to John the Baptist and belongs to the Parish of Krka. It has a Romanesque core with some later rebuilding.
