= A2 motorway (Slovenia) =

Freeway in Slovenia

A2 Motorway
- Avtocesta A2

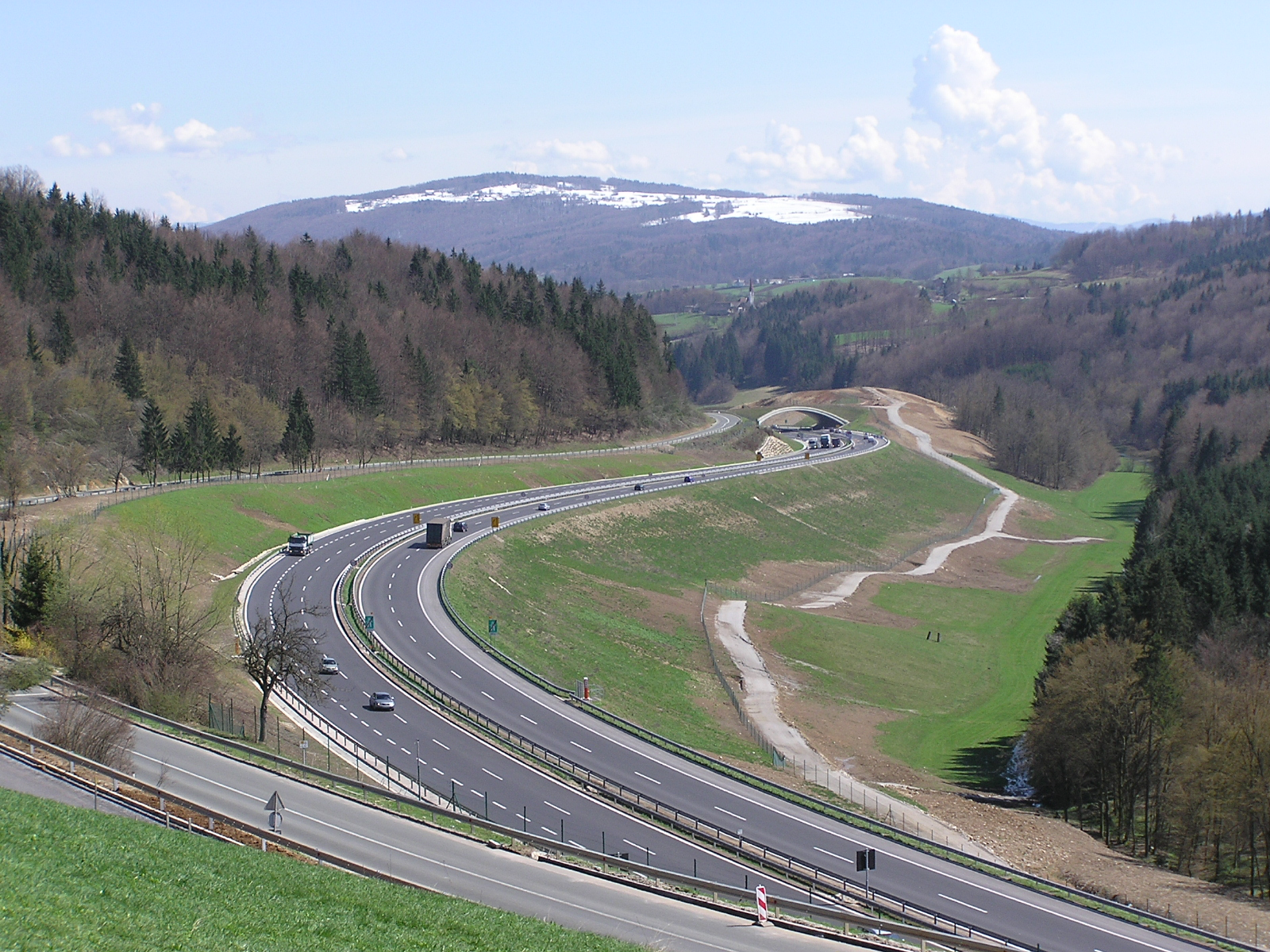
- The Medvedjek Slope on the eastern part of the A2 (Lower Carniola)

Route information
- Part of E61 E70
- Length: 174.5 km (108.4 mi)

Major junctions
- From: A11 in Austria
- A1 near Ljubljana; H3 near Ljubljana
- To: A3 in Croatia

Location
- Country: Slovenia
- Major cities: Jesenice, Kranj, Ljubljana, Novo Mesto, Brežice

Highway system
- Highways in Slovenia

The A2 motorway (Slovene: avtocesta A2, Ilirika) is a motorway in Slovenia, around 180 km long, connecting the Karawanks Tunnel (at the Austrian border) via the capital city Ljubljana to Obrežje (at the Croatian border, near Zagreb). It connects several major Slovene cities, including Kranj, Ljubljana, and Novo Mesto, and is part of Pan-European Corridor X.

The route of the motorway largely follows the path of the Brotherhood and Unity Highway, which was a two-lane non-divided road constructed as the main traffic artery within Yugoslavia. With the construction of the divided motorway, most of the previous road was demolished. A notable exception can be seen on the southern A2 segment between Grosuplje and Višnja Gora, where the previous road was grandfathered into the motorway system; it lacks a hard shoulder and has sharp turns and an exit ramp with a 10% grade. The northern segment between Višnja Gora and Grosuplje follows a completely different path, with three traffic lanes and a relatively lower grade.

== Junctions, exits and rest area ==
Karawanks Tunnel – Obrežje (174,5 km)
Karawanken Autobahn → from Villach, Austria
Border control	0,0 km	Karawanks Tunnel 7864 m (SLO–A) border crossing		
Karawanks Tunnel toll plaza
(1)	5 km	Jesenice west		
Petrol station Rest area	x km	Počivališče Jesenice		Petrol / Petrol
(2)	12 km	Jesenice east		
Rest area	x km	Počivališče Lipce		
Viaduct		Moste Viaduct		Bridge - 442 m
Galeria		Moste Galeria		Tunnel - 184 m
(3)	20 km	Lesce	425	
(4)	24 km	Radovljica	452	OMV / OMV
Petrol station Rest area	24 km	Počivališče Radovljica	452	OMV / OMV
Viaduct		Zgoša Viaduct		Bridge - 189 / 165 m
Viaduct		Dobruša Viaduct		Bridge - 351 m
(5)	28 km	Brezje		
Viaduct		Peračica Viaduct		Bridge - 378 / 367 m
Tunnel		Ljubno Tunnel		Tunnel - 260 / 261 m
Viaduct		Ljubno Viaduct		Bridge - 118 / 320 m
Viaduct		Lesnica Viaduct		Bridge - 186 / 191 m
(6)	32 km	Tržič		European route E652
Viaduct		Tržič Bistrica Viaduct		Bridge - 421 / 426 m
(7)	33 km?	Naklo		
(8)	39 km	Kranj west		
Viaduct		Rupovščica Viaduct		Bridge - 421 / 426 m
(8a)	x km	Kranj north (planned)		
(9)	45 km	Kranj east		
Petrol station Rest area	x km	Počivališče Voklo		Petrol / Petrol
(10)	49 km	Sp. Brnik		Ljubljana Jože Pučnik Airport
(11)	55 km	Vodice		
Rest area	x km	Počivališče Povodje		
(12)	61 km	Ljubljana-Šmartno		
(13)	64 km	Ljubljana-Brod	639	
Covered Cut		Šentvid covered cut		Tunnel - 414 m
(14)	65 km	Ljubljana-Šentvid		
Tunnel		Šentvid Tunnel		Tunnel - 1072 / 1047 m
(14a)	68 km	Ljubljana-Podutik		
(15)	68 km	Koseze interchange		Ljubljana bypass
(16)	69 km	Ljubljana-Brdo		
(36)	A1 (150)	Kozarje interchange	A1 motorway (Slovenia)	A1 turns toward -> Koper
(35)	A1 (149)	Ljubljana west		
Petrol station Rest area		Počivališče Barje		Petrol / Petrol
(34)	A1 (147)	Ljubljana-centrum		
(33)	A1 (144)	Ljubljana-Rudnik		
(32)	A1 (142)	Ljubljana south		
(31)	A1 (142)	Malence interchange	A1 motorway (Slovenia)	Ljubljana bypass A1 turns toward -> Maribor
Tunnel		Debeli hrib Tunnel		Tunnel - 341 / 378 m
Viaduct		Reber Viaduct		Bridge - 608 / 582 m
Tunnel		Mali vrh Tunnel		Tunnel - 414 / 399 m
(17)	78 km	Šmarje–Sap		
(18)	82 km	Grosuplje west		
(19)	85 km	Grosuplje east		
(20)	91 km	Višnja Gora		
Petrol station Rest area		Počivališče Podsmreka		Petrol
Viaduct		Ivančna Gorica Viaduct		Bridge - 214 m
(21)	98 km	Ivančna Gorica		
(22)	105 km	Bič		
Covered Cut		Medvedjek I covered cut		Tunnel - 92 m
Covered Cut		Medvedjek II covered cut		Tunnel - 159 m
Covered Cut		Dolge Dole covered cut		Tunnel - 64 m
(23)	112 km	Trebnje west		
Tunnel		Leščevje Tunnel		Tunnel - 386 / 363 m
Viaduct		Ponikve Viaduct		Bridge - 303 / 312 m
(24)	119 km	Trebnje east		
Viaduct		Dole Viaduct		Bridge - 306 / 308 m
(25)	123 km	Mirna Peč		
Covered Cut		Dolenje covered cut		Tunnel - 253 m
(26)	128 km	Novo Mesto west		
(27)	132 km	Novo Mesto east		
Viaduct		Mačkovec Viaduct		Bridge - 165 / 163 m
Viaduct		Jelše Viaduct		Bridge - 345 / 340 m
Petrol station Rest area	x km	Počivališče Starine		Petrol / Petrol
Viaduct		Dobovo Viaduct		Bridge - 254 m
(28)	139 km	Kronovo		
Viaduct		Toplice Viaduct		Bridge - 164 m
(29)	145 km	Dobruška Vas		
(30)	152 km	Smednik		
Petrol station Rest area	x km	Počivališče Zaloke		Petrol / Petrol
(31)	158 km	Krško		
Petrol station Rest area	x km	Počivališče Grič		Petrol
(32)	170 km	Brežice		
Covered Cut		Čatež covered cut		Tunnel - 105 m
(33)	179 km	Obrežje		OMV / Petrol
Petrol station Rest area	179 km	Počivališče Mokrice		OMV / Petrol
Border control	180 km	Obrežje (SLO) – Bregana (HR) border crossing		
Autocesta A3 → to Zagreb, Croatia

== Tunnels and covered cuts ==
From the northwest to the southeast, the A2 motorway features the following tunnels and covered cuts:

Tunnels

- Karawanks Tunnel (Karavanški predor; 7,864 m or 25,801 ft, 8,019 m or 26,309 ft with portal)
- Ljubno Tunnel (Predor Ljubno; right: 260 m or 850 ft, left: 261 m or 856 ft)
- Šentvid Tunnel (Predor Šentvid; right: 1,072 m or 3,517 ft, left: 1,047 m or 3,435 ft)
- Šentvid Junction (Priključek Šentvid; arm B: 291 m or 955 ft, arm C: 402 m or 1,319 ft)
- Fat Hill (Debeli hrib; right: 341 m or 1,119 ft, left: 378 m or 1,240 ft)
- Little Peak (Mali vrh; right: 414 m or 1,358 ft, left: 399 m or 1,309 ft)
- Leščevje Tunnel (Predor Leščevje; right: 369 m or 1,211 ft, left: 363 m or 1,191 ft)

Covered cuts

- Moste
- Ljubljana–Šentvid
- Šentvid Junction (arm A and arm D)
- Medvedjek (I and II)
- Dolge Dole
- Doline (Karteljevo)
- Dobrove (Otočec)
- Čatež (right and left)
