= Dob pri Šentvidu =

Dob pri Šentvidu Dob (until 1953)
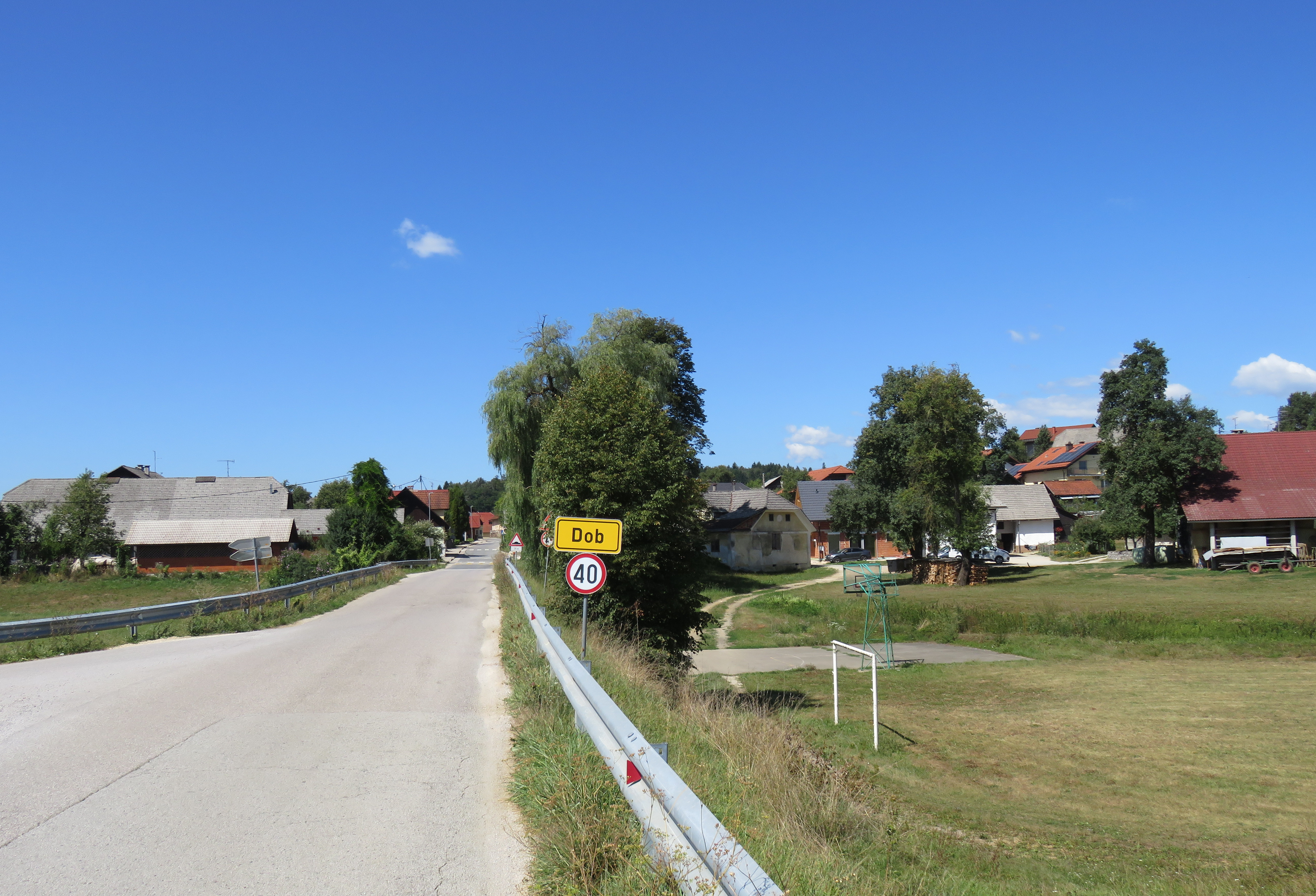

- Location in Slovenia
- Coordinates: 45°55′56.1″N 14°51′38.61″E
- Country: Slovenia
- Traditional region: Lower Carniola
- Statistical region: Central Slovenia
- Municipality: Ivančna Gorica

Area
  - Total: 1.54 km^{2} (0.59 sq mi)
- Elevation: 309.8 m (1,016 ft)

Population (2002)
  - Total: 196

Dob pri Šentvidu (pronounced [ˈdoːp pɾi ʃɛnˈtʋiːdu] or [ˈdoːp pɾi ʃənˈtʋiːdu]) is a village in the Municipality of Ivančna Gorica in central Slovenia. It lies east of Ivančna Gorica and the A2 motorway runs across the settlement territory to the south of the village core. The area is part of the historical region of Lower Carniola. The municipality is now included in the Central Slovenia Statistical Region.

== Name ==
The name of the settlement was changed from Dob to Dob pri Šentvidu in 1953.

== Church ==
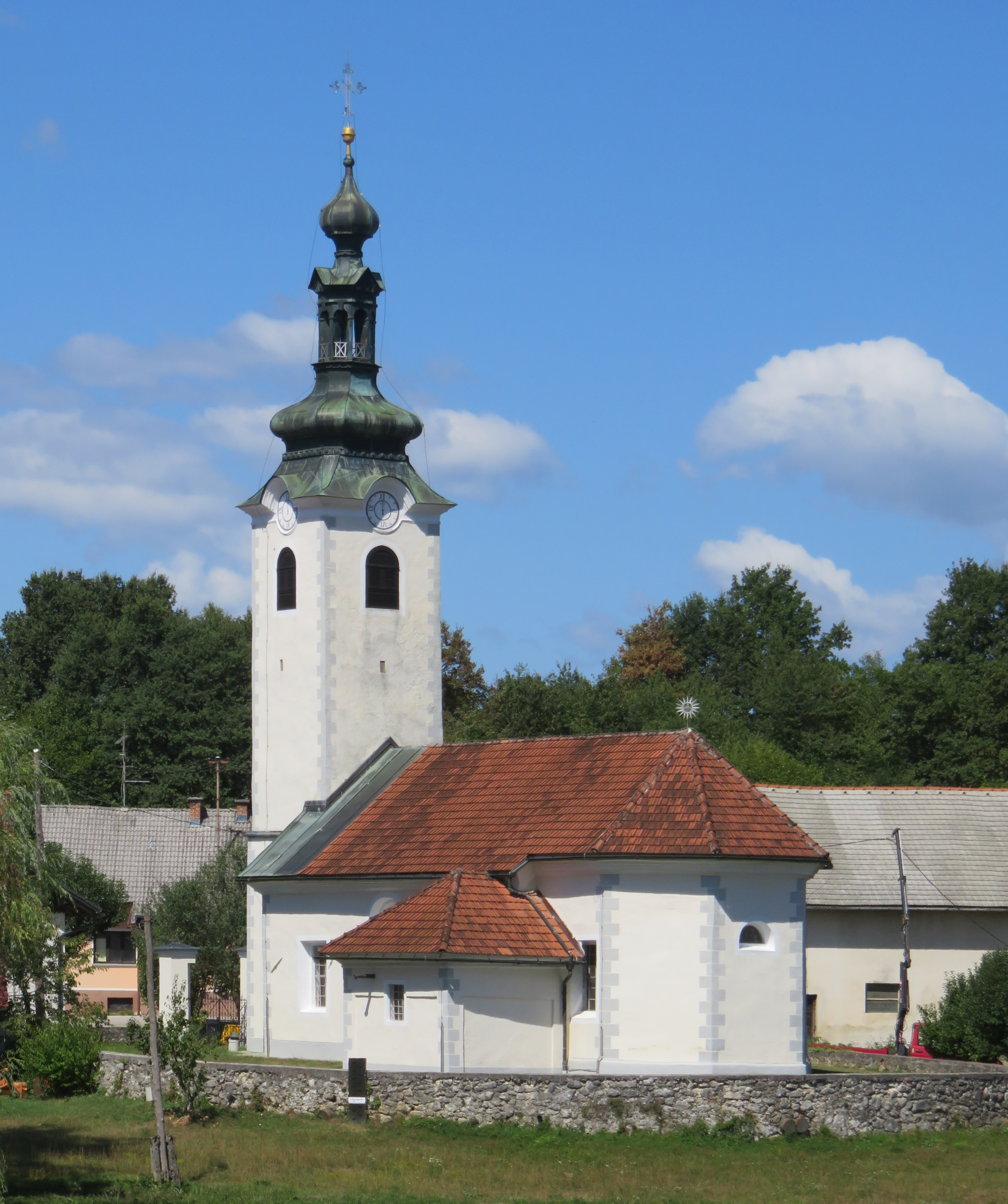
Saint Peter's Church

The local church is dedicated to Saint Peter and belongs to the Parish of Šentvid pri Stični. It was built in the 17th century.
