= St. Bartholomew's Church (Ljubljana) =

Church in Ljubljana, Slovenia

Coordinates: 46°3′47.73″N 14°29′39.64″E

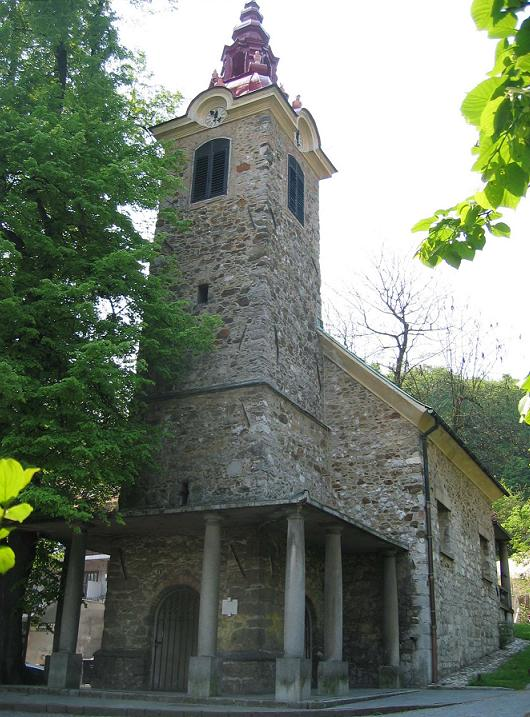
- "Old Church"
- Interactive map of the St. Bartholomew's Church area

General information
- Architectural style: Baroque
- Location: Šiška District / Ljubljana, Slovenia
- Client: Roman Catholic Archdiocese of Ljubljana

Technical details
- Structural system: Brick and reinforced concrete

St. Bartholomew's Church (Slovene: cerkev sv. Jerneja) — referred to by locals as the Old Church (Stara cerkev, which gave its name to a nearby Ljubljana city bus stop) — is a Catholic chapel of ease and one of the oldest church buildings in Ljubljana, Slovenia.

== History ==
The church was first mentioned in 1370, when representatives of the Doge of Venice and Leopold III and Albert III of Habsburg concluded a peace treaty in front of it on 30 October 1370, in which the Austrians agreed to return the city of Trieste for the compensation of 75,000 florins.

In 1526, its valuables were donated to a fund for improving the city's defenses against Turkish attacks. At the end of the 15th century and beginning of the 16th, it was a venue of Protestant liturgy, but during the Slovene Counter-Reformation in 1618, it was reclaimed as a Roman Catholic church. In 1825, it was damaged by fire and restored several times.

== Architecture ==
Some elements of the original Romanesque church have been preserved, among them the portal on the northern side. Between 1933 and 1936, the church was redesigned according to plans by Jože Plečnik, and in 2009 it was added to the Slovenian Cultural Heritage List as a cultural monument of national significance under the number 2000.

== Events ==
On the Sunday nearest to St. Bartholomew's Day (24 August)—known as Mosquito Sunday—stalls selling gingerbread, pottery, and basketry and other wickerwork line the main road here. Parades and celebrations, which attracted hundreds of people, were also once held beside this church.
