= Bič, Trebnje =

Bič
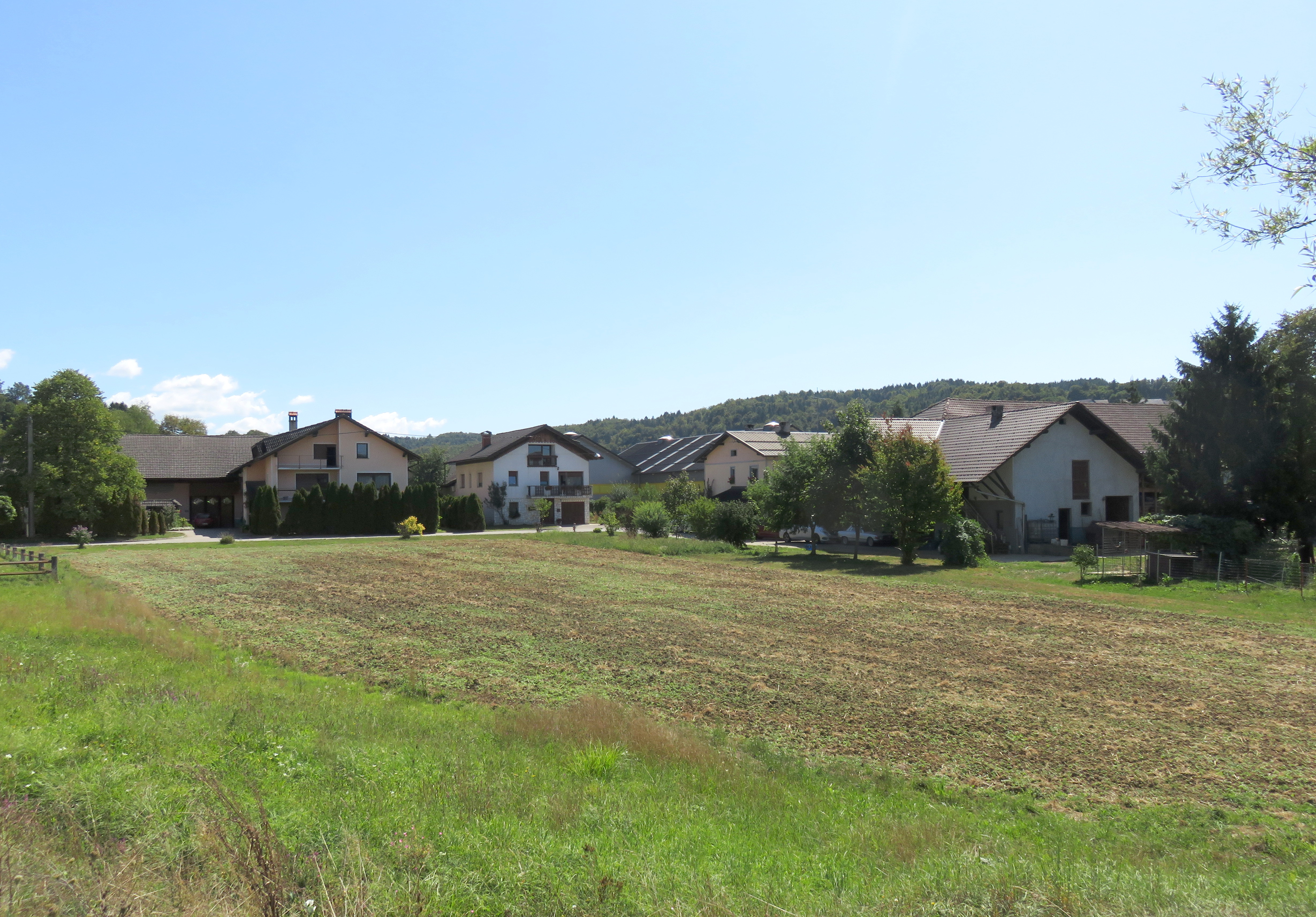

- Location in Slovenia
- Coordinates: 45°55′32.57″N 14°53′21.72″E
- Country: Slovenia
- Traditional region: Lower Carniola
- Statistical region: Southeast Slovenia
- Municipality: Trebnje

Area
  - Total: 1.79 km^{2} (0.69 sq mi)
- Elevation: 306.1 m (1,004 ft)

Population (2002)
  - Total: 56

Bič (pronounced [ˈbitʃ]; German: Fitsch) is a village in the Municipality of Trebnje in eastern Slovenia. It lies just north of the Slovenian A2 motorway east of Ivančna Gorica. The area is part of the traditional region of Lower Carniola. The Municipality of Trebnje is now included in the Southeast Slovenia Statistical Region.

== Name ==
Bič was attested in written records as Physchs in 1250, Vutsch in 1251, Fitsch in 1293, and Fütsch in 1297, among other spellings. Based on medieval attestations of the name, it may have developed from *bъčь 'stone- or wood-lined depression with a spring, well' (cf. Slovene beč 'barrel'), thus referring to a local geographical feature. In the past the German name was Fitsch.

== Church ==
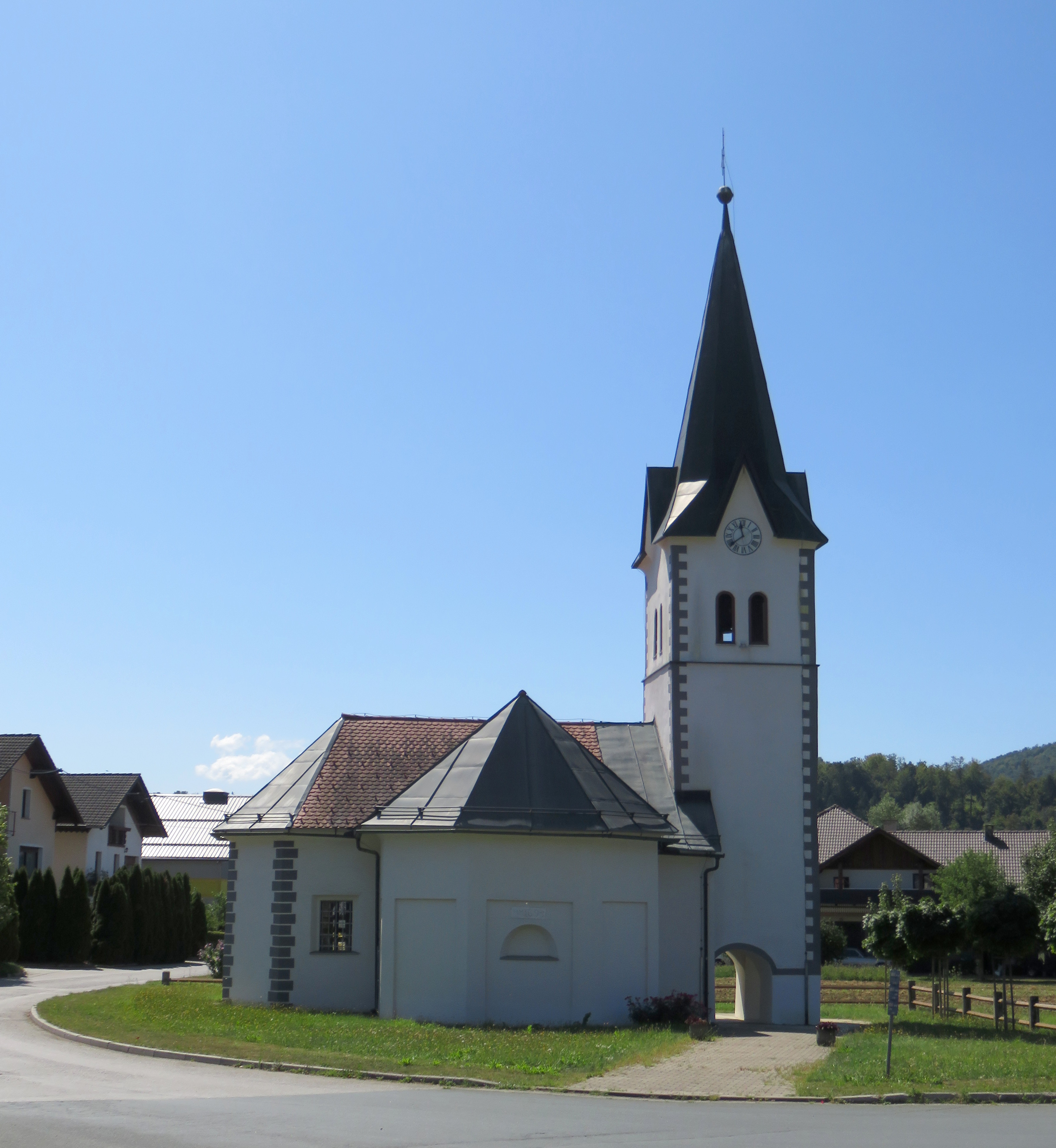
Saint Martin's Church

The local church is dedicated to Saint Martin and belongs to the Parish of Veliki Gaber. It has a Romanesque nave with 17th-century additions.
