= Spodnja Šiška =

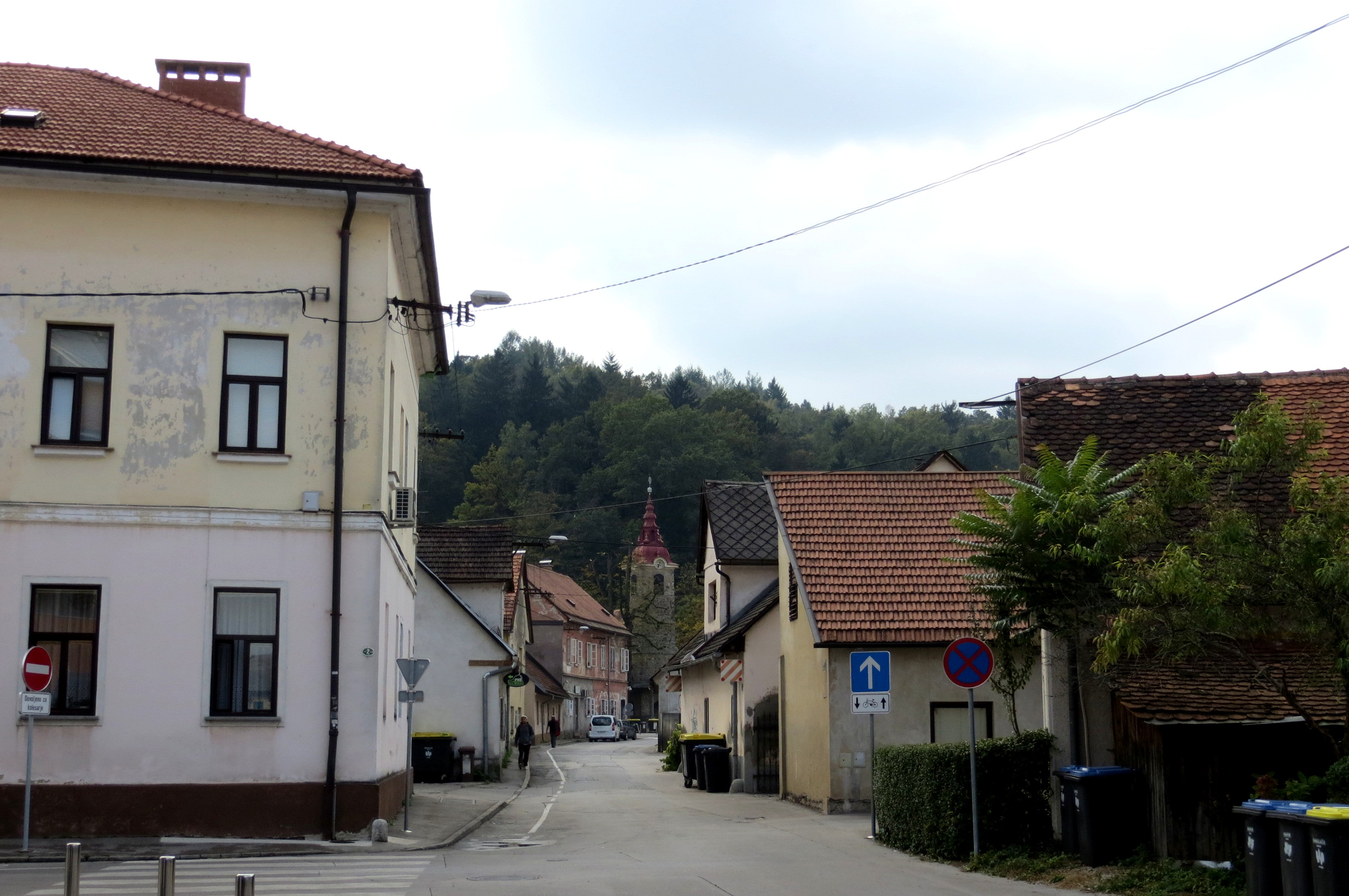

- Location in Slovenia
- Coordinates: 46°3′51″N 14°29′47″E
- Country: Slovenia
- Traditional region: Upper Carniola
- Statistical region: Central Slovenia
- Municipality: Ljubljana

Spodnja Šiška (pronounced [ˈspoːdnja ˈʃiːʃka]; German: Unterschischka) is a formerly independent settlement in the northwest part of the capital Ljubljana in central Slovenia. It is part of the traditional region of Upper Carniola (Note: Some modern survey-based reinterpretations of Slovenia's traditional regions differ from the standard historical definitions of these regions.) and is now included with the rest of the municipality in the Central Slovenia Statistical Region.

== Name ==
The name Spodnja Šiška literally means 'lower Šiška', distinguishing the settlement from neighboring Zgornja Šiška (literally, 'upper Šiška'). The name Šiška was attested in 1308 as ze Cheis (and as Cheysse in 1330 and pey Keysk in 1331). The name is derived from *Hiška, a diminutive of the common noun hiša 'house'. The phonological change of H- > Š- may be due to Upper Carniolan palatalization, discontinuous assimilation, or both. The semantic motivation of the name is attributed to a single small house that originally stood in the settlement. In the past the German name was Unterschischka.

== History ==
The oldest settlement core of Spodnja Šiška lies between Milan Majcen Street (Slovene: Ulica Milana Majcna, formerly Saint Bartholomew Street, Svetega Jerneja cesta) and Fire Station Street (Gasilska cesta). The houses in this area had long strips of land in a north-south direction. In 1382, a peace treaty between the Republic of Venice and Leopold III of Habsburg was signed in front of St. Bartholomew's Church in Spodnja Šiška, whereby the Austrians agreed to return the city of Trieste. Spodnja Šiška was annexed by the City of Ljubljana in 1914, ending its existence as an independent settlement.

== Church ==
The church in Spodnja Šiška is one of the oldest in Ljubljana. It is dedicated to St. Bartholomew and is also known as the Old Church (Slovene: Stara cerkev). It was built in the 13th century and was remodeled between 1933 and 1938 by the Slovene architect Jože Plečnik.

== Notable people ==
Notable people from Spodnja Šiška include:

- Jožef Mariofil Holeček (1872–1923), religious writer
- Anton Sojar (1881–1923), priest and religious leader in the United States
- Dragica Legat Košmerl (1883–1956), zither player, zither teacher, and composer
- Aleksa Ivanc Olivieri (1916–2010), painter, graphic designer, and art restorer
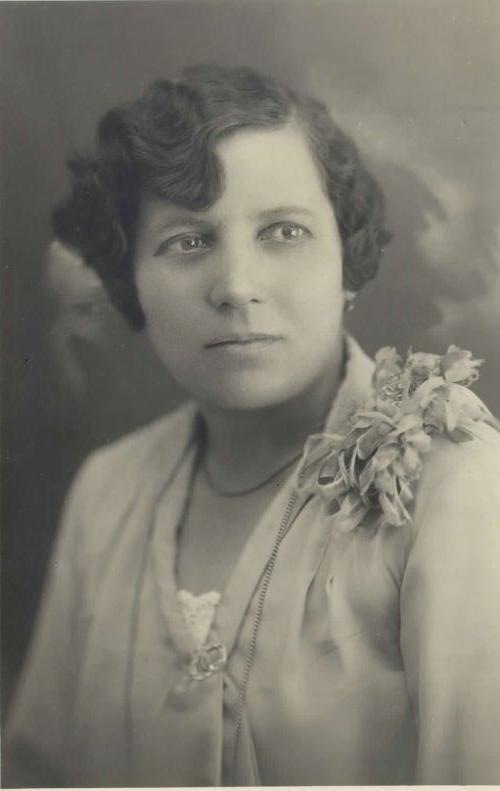
Zither player and composer Dragica Legat Košmerl in the 1920s
