= Trata (Ljubljana) =

- Location in Slovenia
- Coordinates: 46°5′22.16″N 14°28′23.03″E
- Country: Slovenia
- Traditional region: Upper Carniola
- Statistical region: Central Slovenia
- Municipality: Ljubljana
- Elevation: 315 m (1,033 ft)

Trata (pronounced [ˈtɾaːta]) is a former settlement in central Slovenia in the northwest part of the capital Ljubljana. It belongs to the Šentvid District of the City Municipality of Ljubljana. It is part of the traditional region of Upper Carniola and is now included with the rest of the municipality in the Central Slovenia Statistical Region.

== Geography ==
The older part of Trata stands at the edge of the plain immediately south of Šentvid, extending east of the railroad to Jesenice, and the newer part stands near Klagenfurt Street (Celovška cesta). There are meadows near the houses further from the main road, and fields to the east where the soil is sandy.

== Name ==
Trata was attested in historical sources as Tratten in 1414 and Traten in 1428. The name Trata occurs several times in Slovenia. It is derived from the Slovene common noun trata 'small treeless meadow', which was borrowed from Middle High German trat 'meadow'.

== History ==
In the 1900 census Trata had a population of 59 living in 10 houses, and in the 1931 census 81 people living in 14 houses. It was part of the Parish of Šentvid nad Ljubljano. The Štora textile factory was established in Trata in 1919. By the 1930s, Trata was connected to the Ljubljana tram network. Trata was annexed by Šentvid in 1961, ending its existence as an independent settlement. Trata later became part of Ljubljana when Šentvid was annexed by Ljubljana in 1974.

The Žibert Inn is a landmark of Trata. The original inn was razed in the 1970s, when Klagenfurt Street was widened, and the business was relocated into an adjacent building.

== Notable people ==
Notable people that were born or lived in Trata include:

- Tine Rožanc (1895–1942), communist activist and People's Hero of Yugoslavia
