= Dolenje Ponikve =

- Location in Slovenia
- Coordinates: 45°53′38.05″N 15°2′41.4″E
- Country: Slovenia
- Traditional region: Lower Carniola
- Statistical region: Southeast Slovenia
- Municipality: Trebnje

Area
  - Total: 1.87 km^{2} (0.72 sq mi)
- Elevation: 266.8 m (875 ft)

Population (2002)
  - Total: 161

Dolenje Ponikve (pronounced [dɔˈleːnjɛ pɔˈniːkʋɛ]) is a settlement in the Municipality of Trebnje in eastern Slovenia. It lies on the road leading south from Dolenja Nemška Vas towards Mirna Peč and Novo Mesto. The area is part of the historical region of Lower Carniola. The municipality is now included in the Southeast Slovenia Statistical Region.
