= Ljubno, Radovljica =

Ljubno
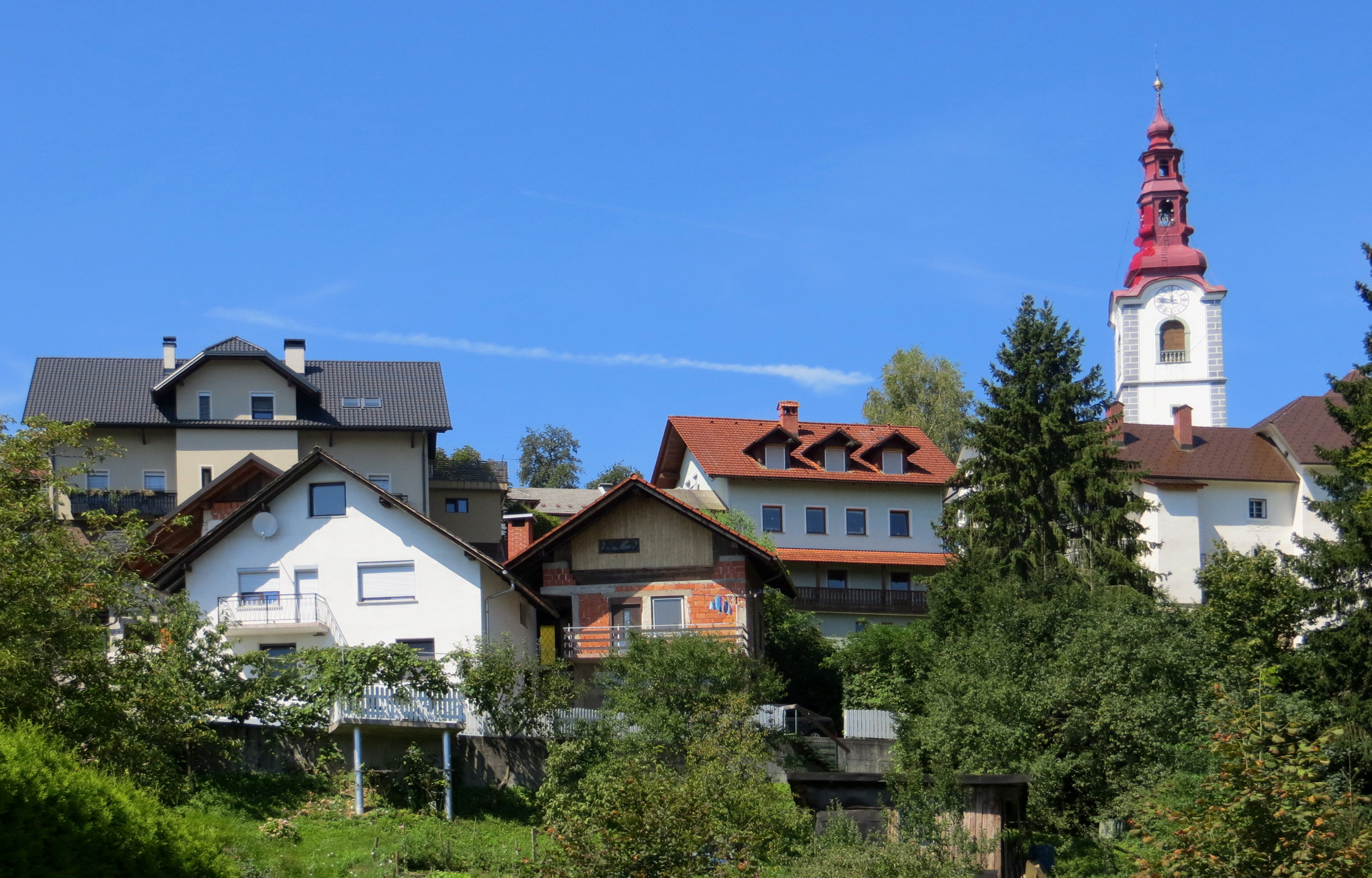

- Location in Slovenia
- Coordinates: 46°18′49.02″N 14°14′52.63″E
- Country: Slovenia
- Traditional region: Upper Carniola
- Statistical region: Upper Carniola
- Municipality: Radovljica
- Elevation: 450.6 m (1,478 ft)

Population (2002)
  - Total: 478

Ljubno (pronounced [ˈljuːbnɔ], German: Laufen) is a village in the Municipality of Radovljica in the Upper Carniola region of Slovenia.

== Church ==
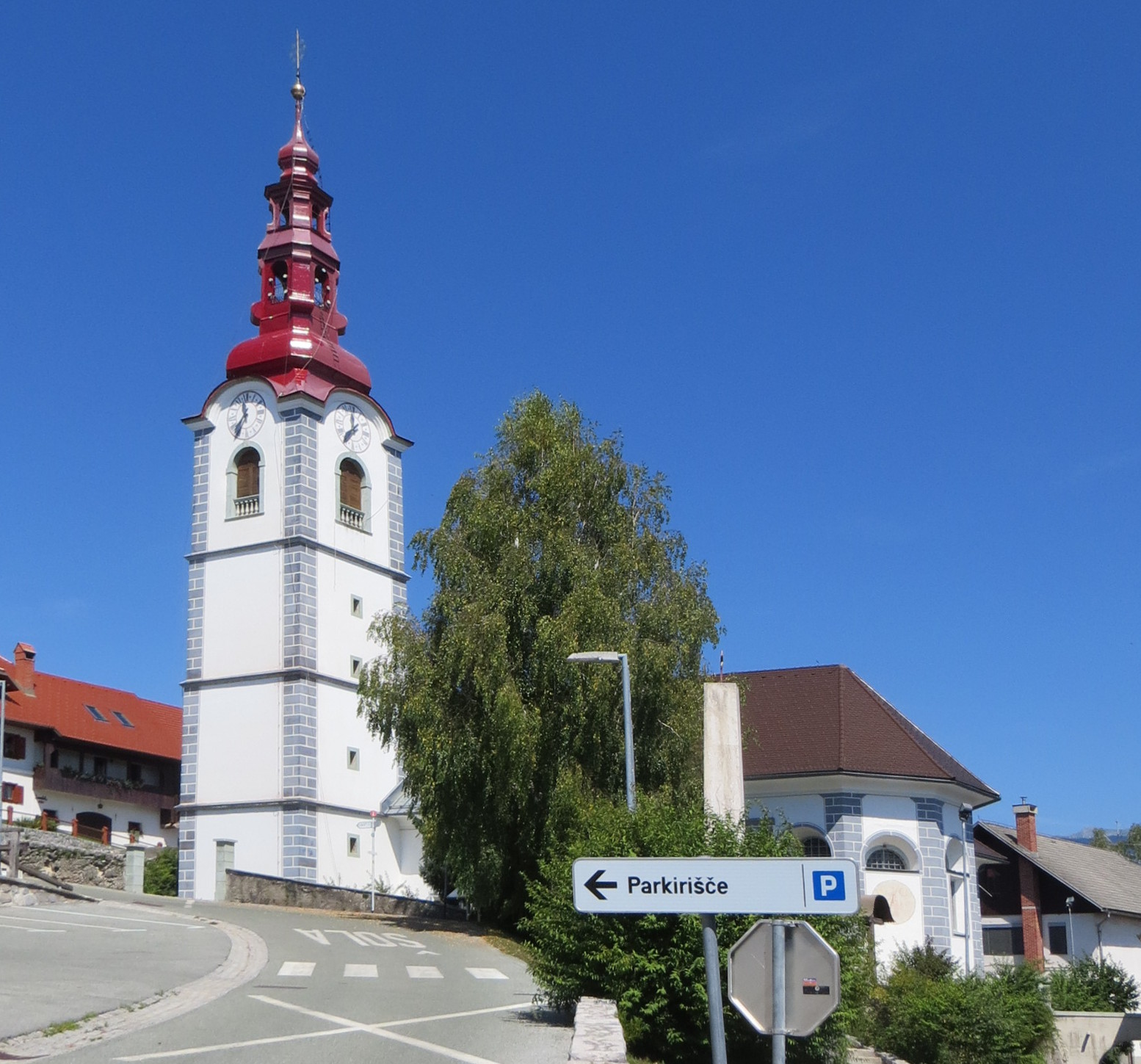
Mary Help of Christians Church

The church in Ljubno is dedicated to Mary Help of Christians. It stands in the northern part of the village and dates from around 1600. It has a rectangular barrel-vaulted stuccoed nave and a chancel walled on three sides.
