= Dravlje =

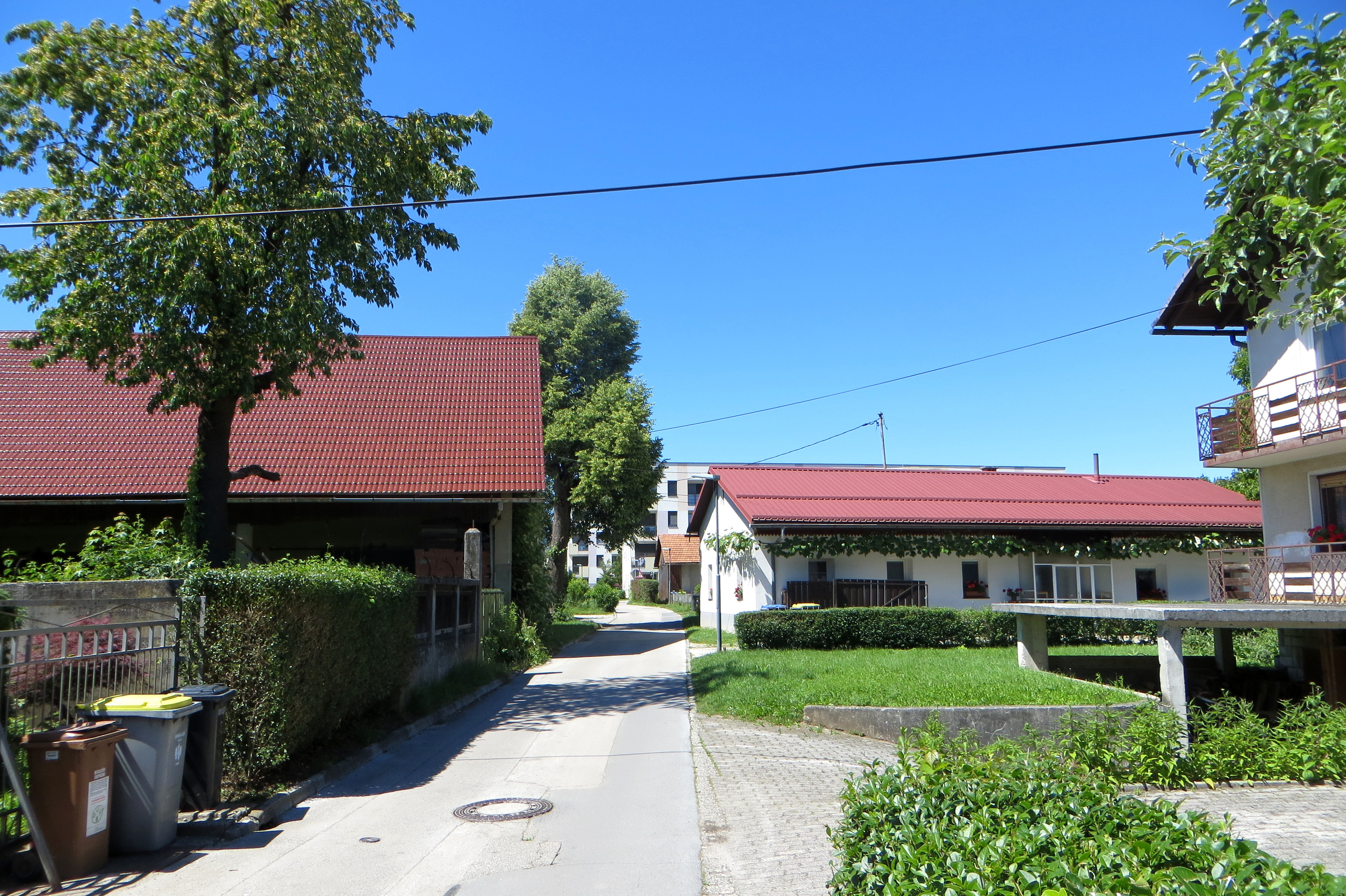

- Location in Slovenia
- Coordinates: 46°4′49″N 14°28′47″E
- Country: Slovenia
- Traditional region: Upper Carniola
- Statistical region: Central Slovenia
- Municipality: Ljubljana
- Elevation: 311 m (1,020 ft)

Dravlje (pronounced [ˈdɾaːu̯ljɛ]; German: Draule) is a former village in the City Municipality of Ljubljana, the capital of Slovenia.

== Geography ==
Dravlje is an elongated settlement at a transition from gravelly to clay soil that also corresponded to a border between cultivated fields (to the east) and meadows (to the south and west). The older houses extend to Zgornja Šiška. The former fields extended to the railroad to Upper Carniola but were mostly developed with new construction after the Second World War. Today's streets in the neighborhood correspond to the old farm roads between the fields.

== Name ==
Dravlje was attested in written sources in 1136–68 as Draulach (and as Dreolach in 1330 and Draewlach in 1358). The name is based on the demonym Dravľane 'people from the Drava Valley', derived from the name of the Drava River. The name presumably refers to internal colonization of Slovenia before the 13th century, when people from the Drava Valley moved to the area. In the past the German name was Draule.

== History ==
Dravlje was annexed by the City of Ljubljana in 1953, ending its existence as an independent settlement.

== Church ==
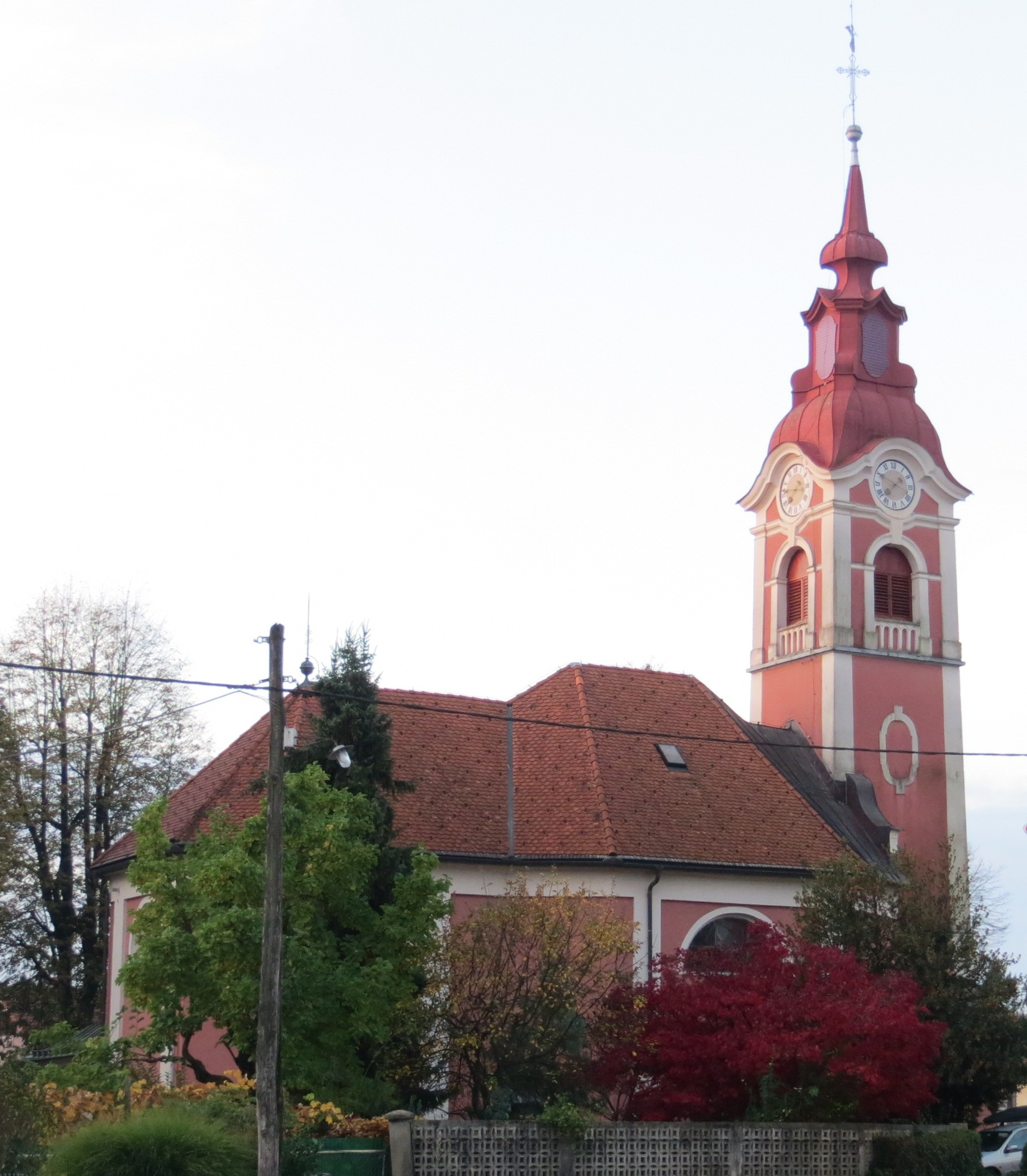
Saint Roch's Church

A Baroque church dedicated to Saint Roch stands at the north end of the former village. It was formerly a popular pilgrimage destination. The church was built starting in 1646 (but not completed until 1682) in thanksgiving for the end of a plague epidemic that lasted several years. From 1956 to 1991, the south wall of the church contained four statues of saints that were invoked against the plague (Saint Roch, Saint Urban, Saint Sebastian, and the Virgin Mary). They are the work of Matej Tomec (1814–1885) and were removed from the chapel-shrine on Klagenfurt Street (Slovene: Celovška cesta) when it was destroyed in 1956. The shrine, which dated from 1645 and had been renovated in 1874, was rebuilt after the collapse of communism in 1991 and the statues were returned to it. There is a linden-lined boulevard leading to the cemetery next to the church.

Dravlje Cemetery stands next to the church. The communities south of Dravlje (Zgornja Šiška, Spodnja Šiška, Koseze) belonged to the Parish of Šentvid for administration of last rites, banns of marriage, and marriages. However, baptisms, churching of women, and funerals were handled by Saint Peter's Parish (although recorded in the Šentvid parish records). Accordingly, burials took place at Saint Christopher's Cemetery from 1779 and then starting in 1906 also at Holy Cross Cemetery (today's Žale). The new cemetery at Dravlje, which then served these communities, was consecrated on October 27, 1907. Saint Christopher's Cemetery was destroyed in the 1950s to build the Ljubljana Exhibition and Convention Centre for the 7th Congress of the Communist Party of Yugoslavia.
