= Zgornja Šiška =

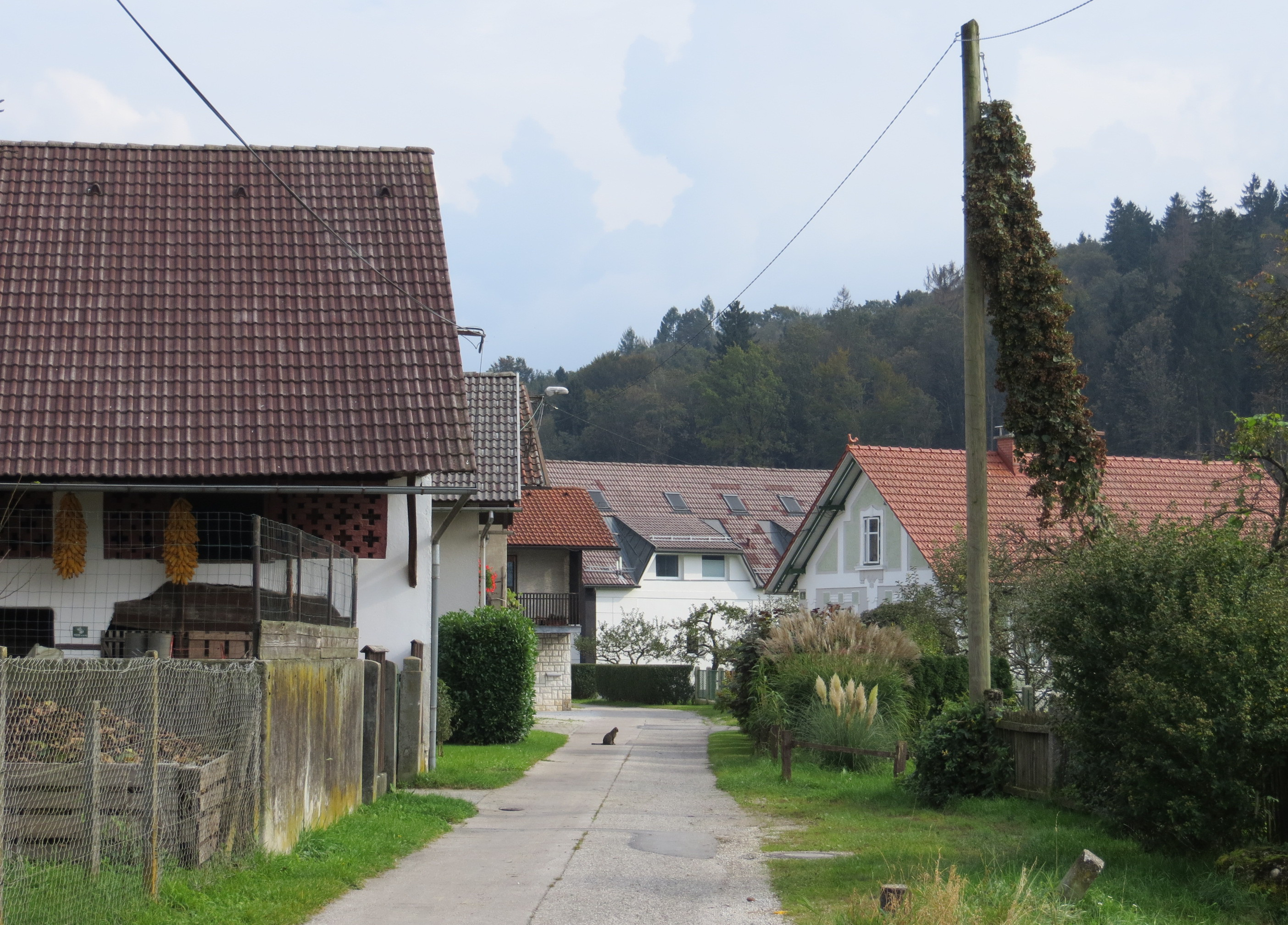

- Location in Slovenia
- Coordinates: 46°4′19″N 14°28′34″E
- Country: Slovenia
- Traditional region: Upper Carniola
- Statistical region: Central Slovenia
- Municipality: Ljubljana
- Elevation: 305 m (1,001 ft)

Zgornja Šiška (pronounced [ˈzɡoːɾnja ˈʃiːʃka]; German: Oberschischka) is a formerly independent settlement in the northwest part of the capital Ljubljana in central Slovenia. It is part of the traditional region of Upper Carniola and is now included with the rest of the municipality in the Central Slovenia Statistical Region.

== Name ==
The name Zgornja Šiška literally means 'upper Šiška', distinguishing the settlement from neighboring Spodnja Šiška (literally, 'lower Šiška'). The name Šiška was attested in 1308 as ze Cheis (and as Cheysse in 1330 and pey Keysk in 1331). The name is derived from *Hiška, a diminutive of the common noun hiša 'house'. The phonological change of H- > Š- may be due to Upper Carniolan palatalization, discontinuous assimilation, or both. The semantic motivation of the name is attributed to a single small house that originally stood in the settlement. In the past the German name was Oberschischka.

== History ==
A Roman aqueduct passed through Zgornja Šiška to supply Emona. The name Jama 'pit' was attested for Zgornja Šiška in 1414, referring to pits and tunnels in the area. During the Ottoman wars in Europe, these pits were used to besiege Ljubljana in 1472. A school was established in Zgornja Šiška in 1882, and a four-year lower secondary school was established in 1929. Zgornja Šiška was annexed by the City of Ljubljana in 1935, ending its existence as an independent settlement.

== Castle ==
The pits in Zgornja Šiška were also the source of the name of Pit Castle (Slovene: Grad Jama), also known as the Galle Manor (Galletova graščina). The manor was the property of the governors of Carniola, and was then owned by the Augustinian order until 1657, which then built a monastery in Ljubljana and sold the property to Johann Benaglia. It stood adjacent to another manor known as the Luckmann Castle (Lukmanov grad). This was owned by the Apfaltrer family and then inherited by the Luckmann family. The two structures were combined in 1787. After the First World War, it was acquired by the Ursuline order and then by the School Sisters of St. Francis of Christ the King. The building was confiscated and nationalized after the Second World War, the nuns were expelled, and it was used to train police dogs. Following various medical uses and renovations, the structure is now the Peter Držaj Hospital (Bolnica dr. Petra Držaja).

== Notable people ==
Notable people from Zgornja Šiška include:

- Brane Dolinar (a.k.a. Brane Demšar, 1928–2000), writer, author of radio plays
- Anton Rojina (1877–1958), industrialist
- Valentin Vodnik (1758–1819), priest, journalist, and poet
