= Pržan =

- Location in Slovenia
- Coordinates: 46°5′16.59″N 14°27′59.76″E
- Country: Slovenia
- Traditional region: Upper Carniola
- Statistical region: Central Slovenia
- Municipality: Ljubljana
- Elevation: 340 m (1,120 ft)

Pržan (pronounced [pəɾˈʒaːn], sometimes Pržanj, in older sources also Peržanj or Peržan; German: Preschgain) is a former settlement in central Slovenia in the northwest part of the capital Ljubljana. It belongs to the Šentvid District of the City Municipality of Ljubljana. It is part of the traditional region of Upper Carniola and is now included with the rest of the municipality in the Central Slovenia Statistical Region.

== Geography ==
Pržan lies at the southeast foot of Gradišče Hill (441 m) along the road from Šentvid to Dobrova. Pržanec Creek runs through the village through the Zaletel Ravine (Zaletelov graben) and past Koseze, eventually emptying into the Glinščica River.

== Name ==
The origin of the name Pržan is uncertain. One theory states that it arose through modern vowel reduction of the prepositional phrase pri Žanu 'at the Žan farm', referring to a farm that formerly existed in the village; the name Žan itself is borrowed from the Friulian name Zan (or Zoan, Zuan), which developed from the Latin name Johannes. Another theory derives the name from *Prežganje (through lenition of g), from the verb prežgati 'to burn', referring to iron smelting, which archaeological evidence indicates was practiced in the village in the 7th to 9th centuries.

== History ==
In the 1900 census Pržan had a population of 64 living in 12 houses, and in the 1931 census 59 people living in 13 houses. The Iskra factory was established in Pržan in 1950 and produced gramophone records, electric razors, and other electrical equipment. Pržan was annexed by Šentvid in 1961, ending its existence as an independent settlement. Pržan later became part of Ljubljana when Šentvid was annexed by Ljubljana in 1974.
