= Tivoli Pond =

Pond in Tivoli Park in Ljubljana, Slovenia

Coordinates: 46°3′7.76″N 14°29′40.57″E

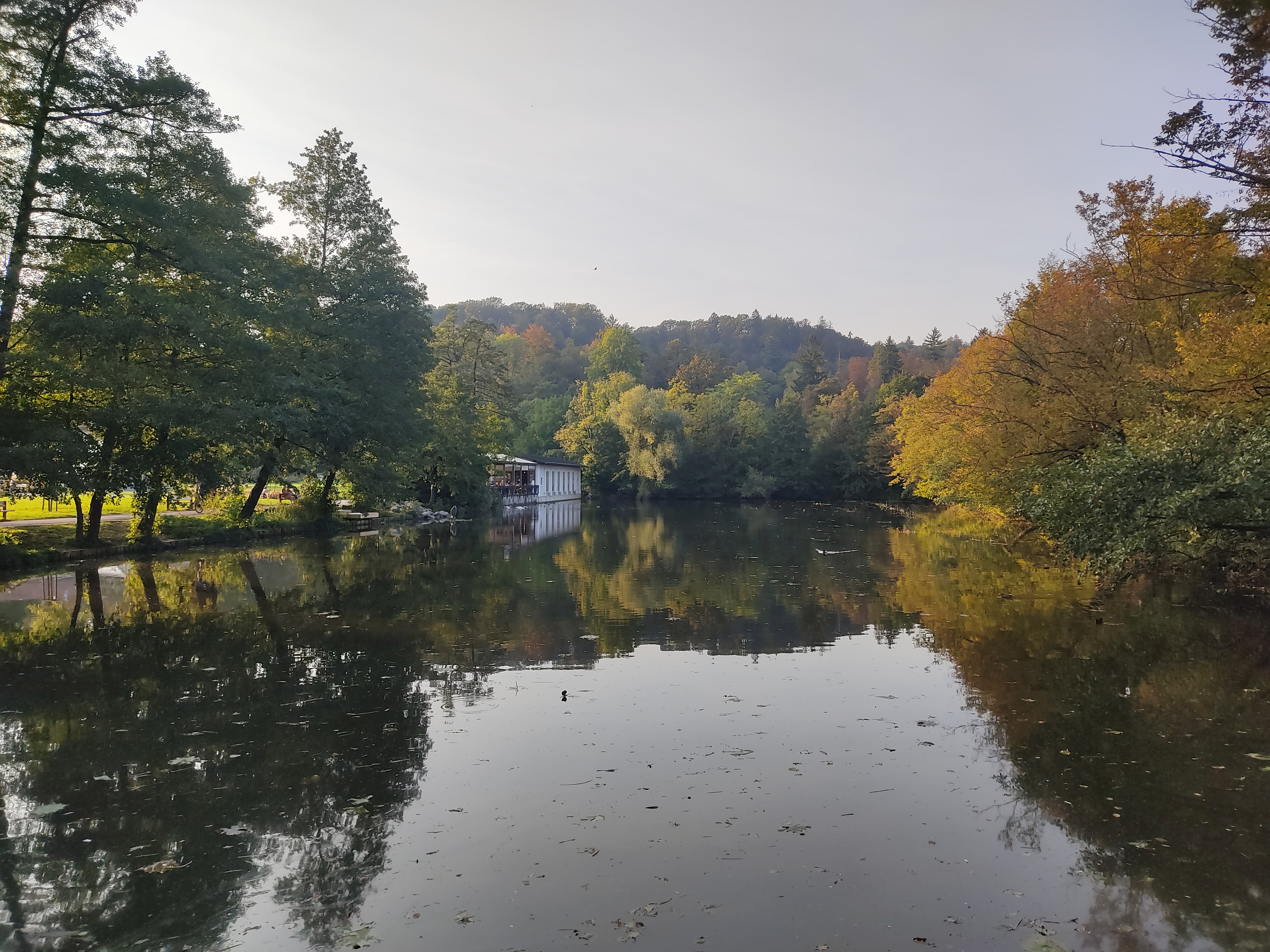
Tivoli Pond with the cafe and Rožnik Hill in the background

Tivoli Pond (Slovene: Tivolski ribnik, less often Tivolski bajer or simply Tivoli or Ribnjak ('pond')) is a man-made pond at the southeastern end of Tivoli City Park in Ljubljana, the capital of Slovenia. It was created in 1880 and forms part of the Tivoli–Rožnik Hill–Šiška Hill Landscape Park. The pond has been used for recreation and fishing, as well as for flood control. The pond is administered by the Barje Fishing Club. It is home to a variety of native and non-native animal species and has also served as a subject and setting for visual artists and musicians.

== Location and arrangement ==
Tivoli Pond is located in the circular plateau of the CR 3/1 (part) Tivoli arrangement area. The area is situated in the southeastern part of Tivoli Park in the immediate vicinity of the Cekin Mansion, along an avenue that was planted in the 1860s. On the western bank of the pond, there are two wooden peninsulas, frequently occupied by young people. A cafe operates at the northwestern end of the pond, in a half-wooden half-concrete building of a former changing-area. It is the only restaurant in this part of the park. On a lawn besides the pond, an open-air library operates in warm weather and a workshop on recycling books and other printed matter, called "The Read Ones." There is a small bronze plastic next to the middle of the western bank of the pond, named Ribe ("Fish"). It is a depiction of two vertically standing fish, created by the expressionist sculptor France Kralj in 1935 and put in the pond in 1994. At the northern end of the pond stands a drinking fountain. Access to water is prevented by trees of the species such as the alder, the willow, the hornbeam, and shrubs. In the vicinity, a staircase leads towards Tivoli Castle. On the steep eastern bank right next to the water grows the hornbeam, preventing erosion. On its upper edge, a wooden fence stands and a barberry hedge has been planted. Besides it, there is a footpath. Next to it, a children's playground has been arranged. On the southern bank, there are a concrete bank, two wooden peninsulas, marsh plants and climbers, a wooden fence and a paved lookout plateau behind it. There are also some shrub species.

== Technical characteristics ==
The pond is shaped like a rectangle and it is shallow with a small volume. It has a clay bottom. In 2007, it was about 140 metres (460 ft) long, about 50 metres (160 ft) wide, had a depth of 0.5 to 1.3 metres (1 ft 8 in to 4 ft 3 in), a surface area of 6,600 square metres (71,000 sq ft), and a volume of 5,000–7,700 cubic metres (180,000–270,000 cu ft). In 2011, it was thoroughly renovated and deepened by half a metre.

=== Water circulation ===
There are three inflows to the pond. The biggest and the most constant is the inflow at the northwestern corner of the pond. It supplies the pond with the water from the southwestern part of Šiška Hill and from a forebay on Rožnik Hill. It appeared for the first time during World War II. The second inflow is a forest creek that flows in the pond near its northeastern corner. Both are installed through a sewer. The third inflow is a forest creek on the northern side of the pond. It is regulated and arranged as a park. In addition, the pond receives surface runoff from the playground, the trails, and the depressions around it. To achieve partial circulation of the water, inflow to the centre of the pond was arranged at its northern side in 2011.

The water of the pond originates from the eastern slopes of Šiška Hill, covered with mixed forest, and from the park areas to the west of the pond, comprising grass and sandy trails. The total catchment area of the pond measures 13.51 square metres (145.4 sq ft) and is entirely located in Tivoli–Rožnik Hill–Šiška Hill Landscape Park. Forest covers 10.11 hectares (25.0 acres) of the catchment area. The average yearly inflow to the pond measures 68,000 cubic metres (2,400,000 cu ft) and depends on annual precipitation. During storms, it significantly increases.

Until 2011, the major outflow from the pond was an overfall in the extreme southern corner of the pond. It was covered with a grate and was installed in a relatively low position. Additionally, the outflow was regulated by the Ljubljana Water Works and Sewerage (VO-KA) company with a floodgate, operated from a case near the statue of Kocbek near its southern side. In 2011, an outflow was made at the southern side.

== History ==
=== Before World War II ===
A pond already existed in Tivoli since 1703. It was made on a private initiative and was situated in the immediate vicinity of the Podturn Mansion. At the end of the 19th or the beginning of the 20th century, it was filled up. However, it was a model for similar ponds in gardens of other residents of Ljubljana and its vicinity.

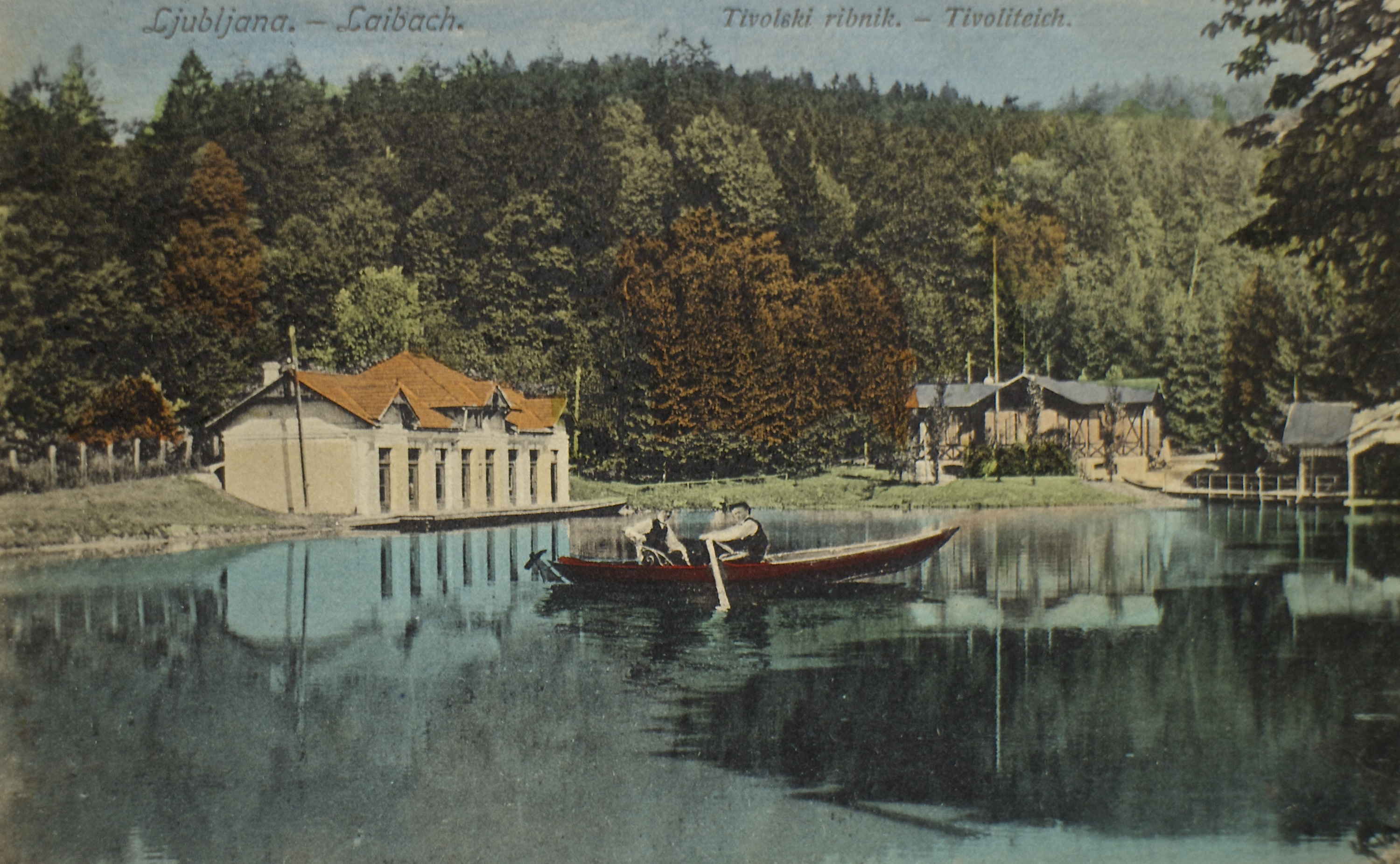
1912 postcard of Tivoli Pond

The current pond was dug in 1880 on the order of the Ljubljana City Council as a fire-fighting water reservoir for a fire brigade from the neighbourhood of Rožna Dolina. Three years later, it was expanded at its southern side, and covered an area of around 8,500 square metres (91,000 sq ft). It was populated with goldfish and other ornamental fish, and European tree frogs heard quite far towards the Ljubljana downtown, at least to Župančič Street (Župančičeva ulica). It was used for boating and ice skating. At first, the pond was managed by the Laibacher Eislaufverein skating club, which built pavilions for skaters and spectators at a certain distance and a covered changing area all of them constructed in a Vienna Secession style. It also arranged the surroundings, among other things it planted seven trees at the upper part of the pond, as evident from postcards and photos from around 1900.

In 1906, in the era of intense German–Slovene cultural struggles, the council revoked the club's management rights due to its disregard for Slovene in public communication. The decree was passed on 17 January 1906 and became valid on 4 February 1906. It offered the management to the Slovene Sokol Society, which turned the offer down. The council continued to manage the facility itself, with the rationale that it was in the general interest of the city to preserve ice skating in Ljubljana as a popular and healthy sport, present in almost every larger city of the time, and that the citizens of Ljubljana would have difficult time missing it. The municipality renovated the pavilions and built the boathouse (čolnarna). Until World War I, it was operated with a skating board, and then for some years without it.

The skating on the pond in the 19th century and the 20th century until World War I and in the mid-war period was organised and payable. The season ticket, often given as a present to children for St. Nicholas, cost 6 krone, which was quite expensive at the time. Visitors skated in the same clothing they wore on the streets: women wore hats and long dresses, whereas men most often wore knickers. There were banks and wooden chairs put on the pond, used by newbies as a help to learn skating, and by men to drive their ladies across the pond. The ice had to be prepared by polishing and swept. Because the income did not cover the costs, the council abolished skating.

The changing-area structure, called Čolnarna ('boathouse'), was about 20 metres (66 ft) long, 5 metres (16 ft) wide and covered with a roof. It was originally property of Franz Joseph I of Austria and stood in Opatija (now Croatia). After it had been transferred to Ljubljana, it stood on the western side of the upper end of the pond, and was used by skaters. After the golden era of skating ended, it was meant to house a museum, however this was never realised. At first, the physician and scientist Alfred Šerko (1879–1938) had his laboratory there, experimenting with snakes and other lizards. Then, the sculptor Ivan Zajec (1869–1952) had a provisional studio there, with piles of books and clay. At last, it was used as a provisional greenhouse for less sensitive plants by the city garden centre. It was also a meeting place of pensioners. At the end of the 1920s and the beginning of the 1930s, an inn operated there, with tenants changing every year, because it was unprofitable. It was then closed, with brief periods of activity even after World War II. Čolnarna was pulled down in the beginning of the 1990s and a new building was constructed at its place.

The boating on the pond was of lesser importance. In 1926, there were six boats available, and less afterwards. At first, the boats were well maintained and elegant, but due to the lack of financial assets, they became damaged over time. The boats were watched over by a watchman who unlocked them in the morning and locked them in the evening. Nonetheless, often the vandals drilled a hole in a boat or two at night, so that they sank.

Nonetheless, although initially deemed a very romantic place and highly valued by residents of Ljubljana, the pond became abandoned over time. In 1932, two swans, a male and female, caught at Bled, were given to Ljubljana by the Queen Maria of Yugoslavia and introduced to the pond. In 1934, the pond was deepened and renovated.

=== From World War II until 1991 ===
Until 1941, the pond was situated at the foot of a large slope, because the ground constantly raised from the railway towards Tivoli Castle. An avenue, starting at Museum Street (Muzejska ulica), then called Nun Street (Nunska ulica), ran there.

After World War II, the pond was used for boating. There were fish, ducks and swans in the pond. On 28 July 1963, the 10th Republic Sports Fishing Championship took place in Tivoli Pond. 43 fishermen participated. It was won by fishermen from Novo Mesto. The pond was well stocked with small fish and large carp at the time. In the 1980/81 winter, it was cleaned and renovated. In 1984, it was protected as part of Tivoli Park, a horticultural monument in the newly established Tivoli–Rožnik Hill–Šiška Hill Landscape Park. It was administered by the Ljubljana Fishing Club.

=== 1991 and afterwards ===
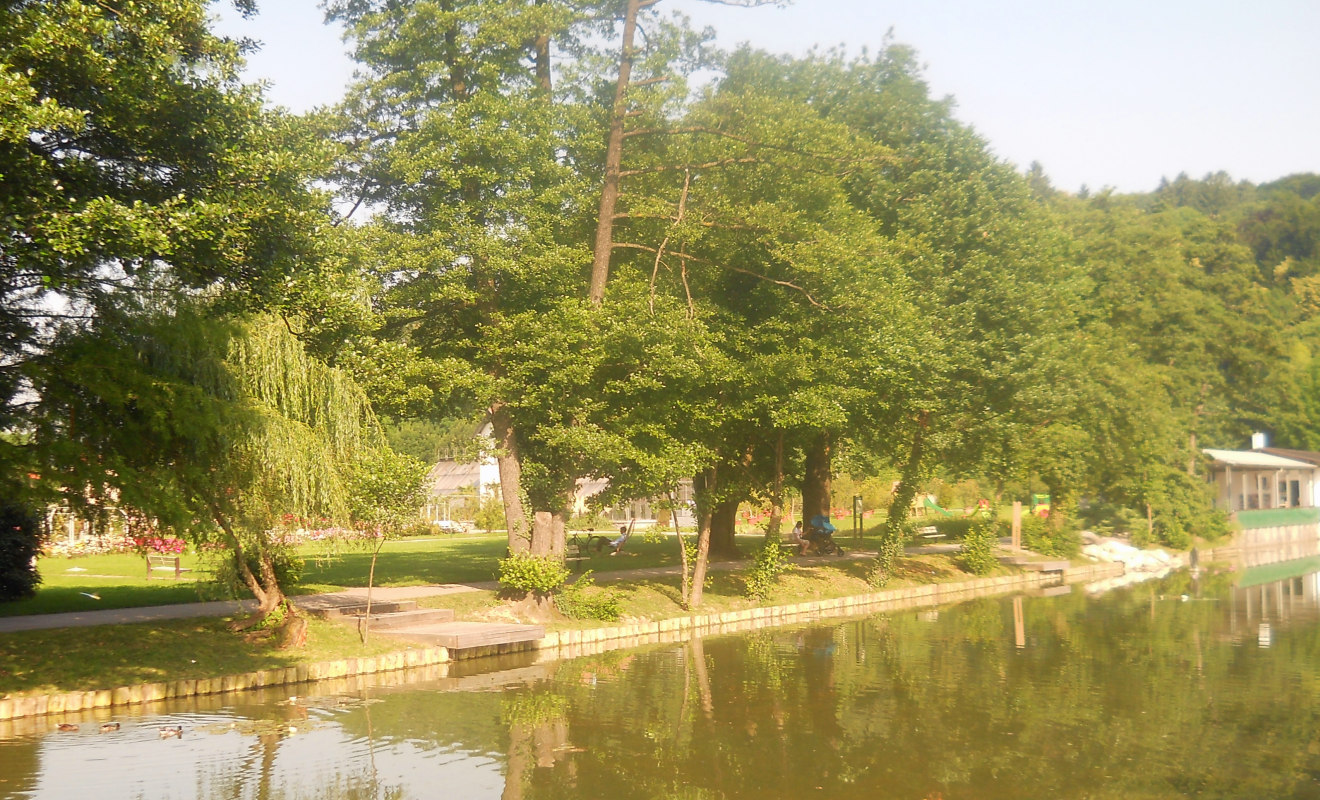
Tivoli Pond after the 2011 renovation. Two wooden staircases have been added to the west side. The Tivoli Greenhouse and the Tivoli Rose Garden are visible in the back.

In 1991, after Slovenia had become an independent country, the mayor of Ljubljana and a specialist in arrangement of gardens and parks Jože Strgar announced a competition for the arrangement of the pond and its environment. The conditions that had to be respected were the preservation of the pond, the preservation of the original plan from the 1940s, when the area was arranged by Boris Kobe, and the reconstruction of Čolnarna. The competition was won by the landscape architects Dušan Ogrin and Davor Gazvoda, and the architect Aleš Vodopivec. A thorough renovation of the area of the old garden centre, including the pond, was carried out in 1994, when Ljubljana celebrated the 850th anniversary of its first mention in written sources. The playground was redesigned as well and new equipment was added to it.

In 2011, the pond was renovated again as compensation for the removal of a protected purple beech (Fagus sylvatica Purpurea Group) next to the Opera House in Ljubljana. The renovation plan was criticised by the art critic Aleksander Bassin and by Gazvoda, as they were concerned that due to reeds being planted the area would diminish by one third, that the flow would diminish, that the renovation would endanger aquatic animals, and that it was not in accordance with the original purpose of the pond. After the works were finished, Tadej Jeršič, the overseer, said that the pond had been deepened for half a meter. 1,500 cubic metres (53,000 cu ft) of silt had been removed from the bottom and water lilies were planted there. To prevent the western shore from being washed away, it was protected with wooden pilots and geotextile in a length of 86 metres (282 ft). In addition, two wooden staircases allowing access to water were built. On the eastern side, a shoal was formed from the excavated material and reeds were planted there to filter the water. On the southern side, two wooden peninsulas were created, marsh plants and climbers were planted, and an outflow was created. Partial circulation of water was established. The renovation was realised in compliance with the Water Framework Directive.

== Fauna ==
In the past, Tivoli Pond was a living place of numerous native fish, like the Danube roach (Rutilus pigus), the tench (Tinca tinca), the European bitterling (Rhodeus amarus), the zander (Sander lucioperca), the European perch (Perca fluviatilis), to the European crayfish (Astacus astacus), to amphibians such as the European tree frog (Hyla arborea), to birds such as the black-crowned night heron (Nycticorax nycticorax), the common moorhen (Gallinula chloropus), and the little bittern (Ixobrychus minutus). The ecosystem was severely hurt by several renovations and the introduction of non-native fish species by fishing clubs as well as by individual visitors. In addition, the red-eared slider (Trachemys scripta elegans) and other pet turtles have been introduced, ousting the native European pond turtle (Emys orbicularis).

After the last renovation in 2011, the pond has again become home to non-native as well as native species. The non-native species and aquarium fish are the most common and an unwanted competitor to native ones. Among the native species, the pond is home to bats, ducks, and frogs. The common moorhen has been spotted too.

== Cultural significance ==
The pond has been depicted on postcards at least since the beginning of the 20th century. In 1991, the painter Žiga Okorn and the sculptor Jiři Kočica installed their artworks on the banks of Tivoli Pond, emphasising the intertwining of nature and civilisation in a comprehensive cultural frame, and even took visitors on a boat ride. In the mid-1990s, the pond was depicted on the tarock XV card of the Slovene Tarock. The depiction was based on a study led by the ethnologist Janez Bogataj, and the card was drawn by the academy-trained painter and illustrator Matjaž Schmidt.

In music, Tivoli Pond was the basis for the Tivoli Pond barcarole, part of the mood-inspired Water-Colours of Ljubljana suite for string orchestra, written by Emil Adamič in 1925. In November 1998, it was arranged as a ballet by the choreographer Ksenija Hribar and performed in the Ljubljana Philharmonic Hall. In 1997, the experimental music group SAETA had a concert next to Tivoli Pond. They played music of the composer Vinko Globokar.

== See also ==
- Koseze Pond, another pond located in Tivoli–Rožnik Hill–Šiška Hill Landscape Park
