= Peter Kosler =

Carniolan lawyer (1824–1879)

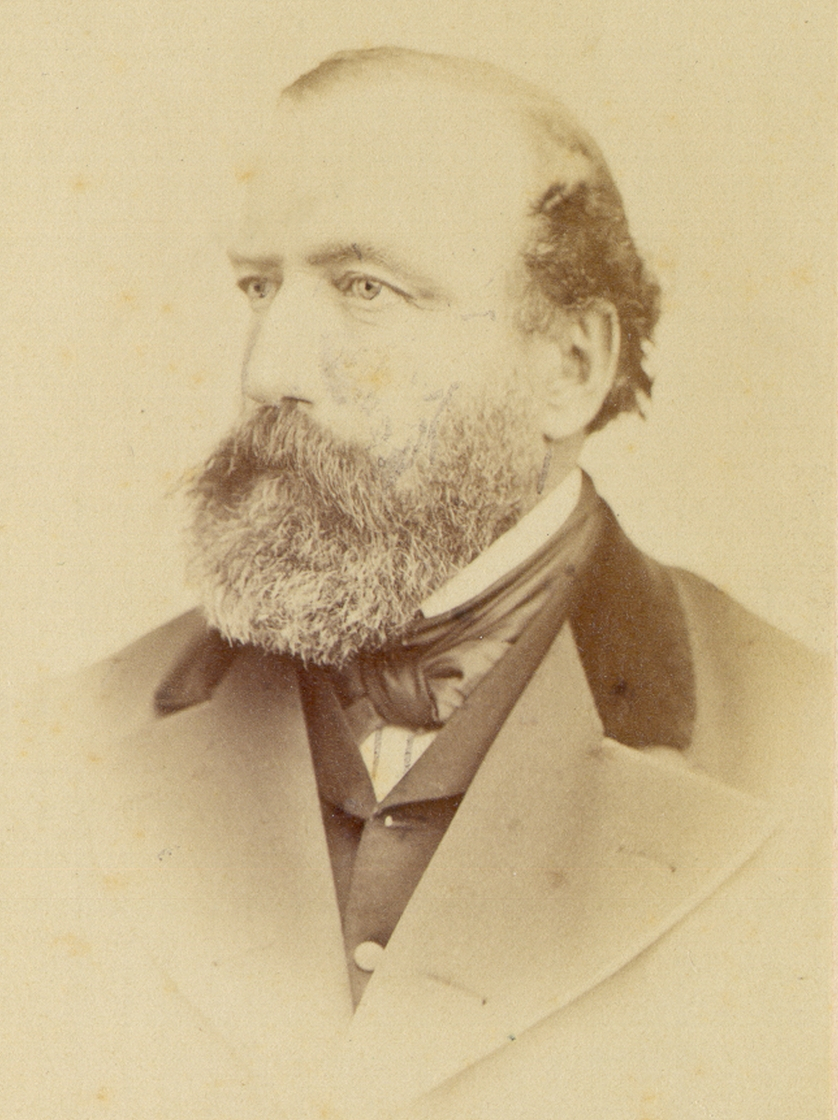
Peter Kosler

Peter Kosler or Kozler (16 February 1824 – 16 April 1879) was an Austrian-Slovene lawyer, geographer, cartographer, activist, and businessman. He was of Gottscheer origin, but also identified with Slovene culture and advocated for the peaceful coexistence of the Slovene and Germanic cultures in Carniola.

Kosler was born in Koče, a village south of Kočevje in Gottschee County, in what was then the Austrian Kingdom of Illyria, and is now Slovenia. He is best known for creating the first map of the Slovene Lands, called Zemljovid Slovenske dežele in pokrajin (Map of the Slovene Land and Provinces). Made already from 1848 until the end of 1852, it was published only in 1861. Despite this, it had a significant impact in the time of the Slovene national awakening.

Born in a relatively well-to-do family, Kosler made a fortune with beer brewing and was the founder of the Union Brewery. He gave large amounts of money to support Slovenian cultural associations and institutions. He was close to the conservative Old Slovene political movement.

Kosler bought Cekin Mansion just outside the center of Ljubljana and renovated it in a neoclassical style. Today, the mansion houses the National Museum of Contemporary History. The Koslers also owned a mansion (Slovene: Kozlerjeva palača) in the center of Ljubljana, close to Congress Square (Kongresni trg) and Čop Street (Čopova ulica), which was regarded as one of the finest Baroque buildings in the city. The building was slated for demolition in 1956 and torn down by the Communist authorities in 1961 in order to widen the nearby street, which caused a public outcry and marked a milestone in the development of postwar urban development in Ljubljana. According to an interview with art historian Damjan Prelovšek in October 2006, trees now grow at the site of the former building, demonstrating that its demolition was a political decision and unnecessary in order to widen the street.

Kosler also owned a plot of land in the Ljubljana Marsh known as Kosler's Thicket (Slovene: Kozlerjeva gošča). During World War II, the plot was used as a mass grave for victims of the Slovenian Home Guard torturer and killer Franc Frakelj.

Kosler died in Ljubljana and is buried at Žale cemetery in Ljubljana.

In 1999, a Slovenian postal stamp was dedicated to Kosler.

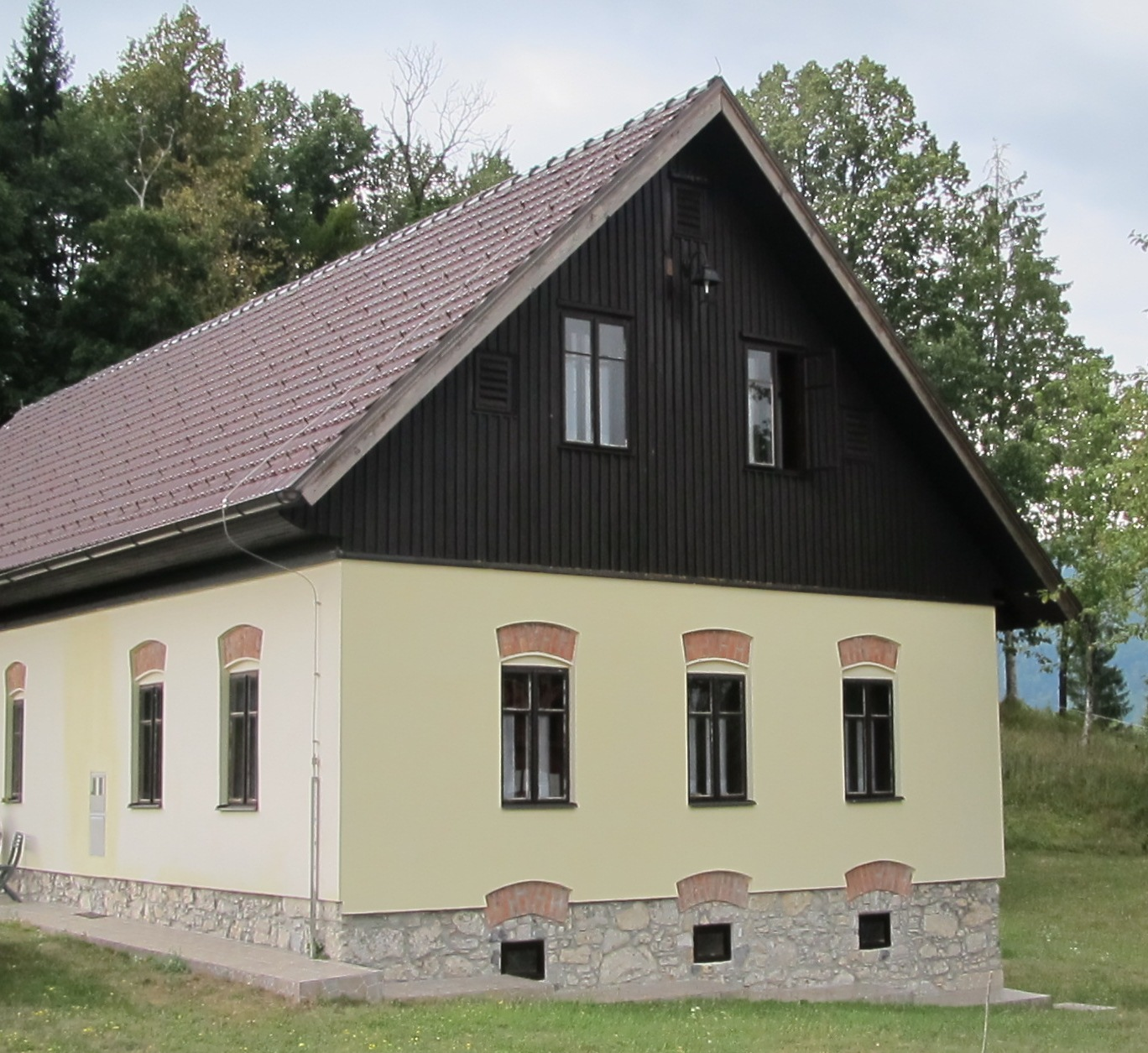
House in Koče where Kosler was born

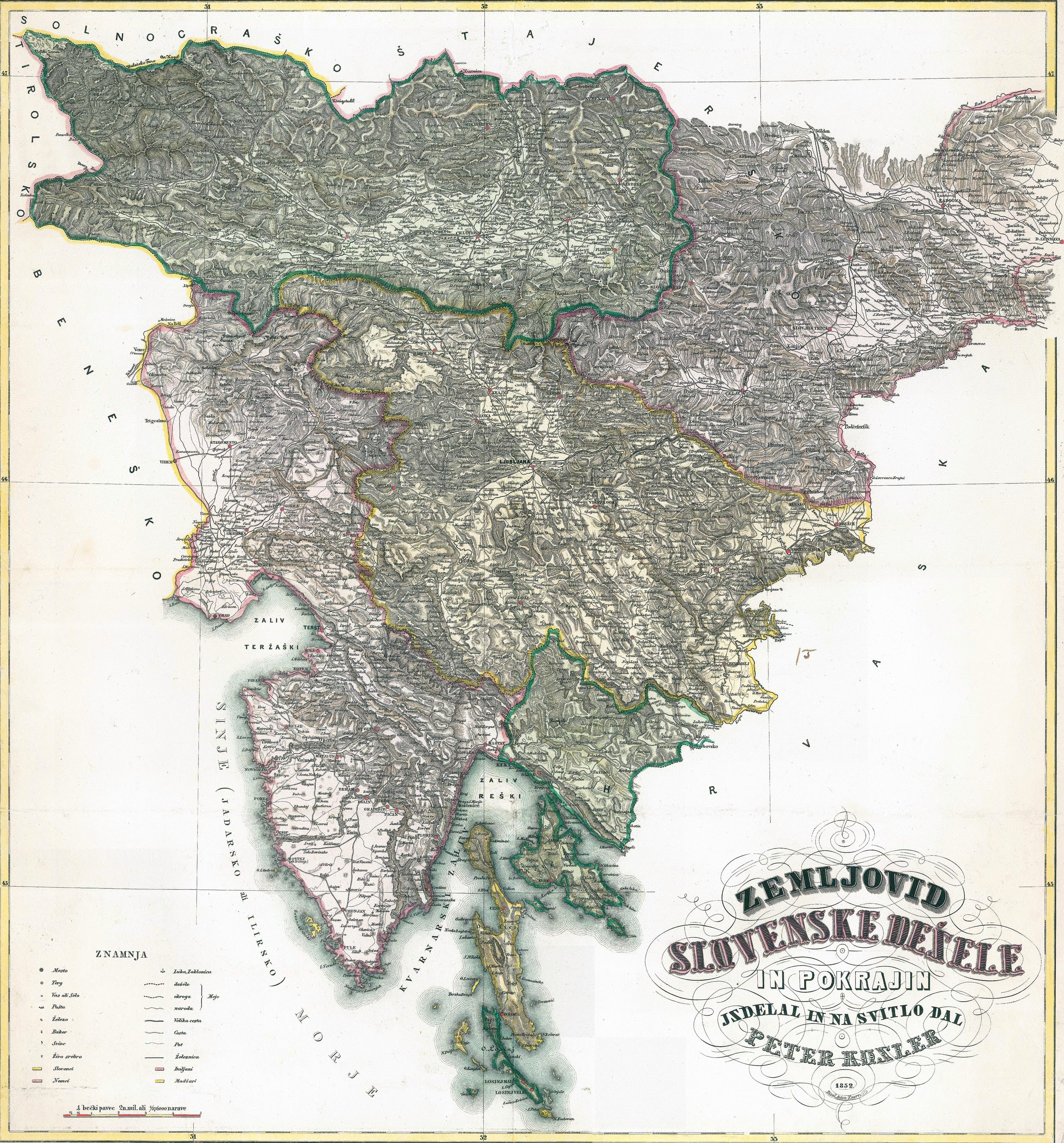
Kosler's map of the Slovene Lands

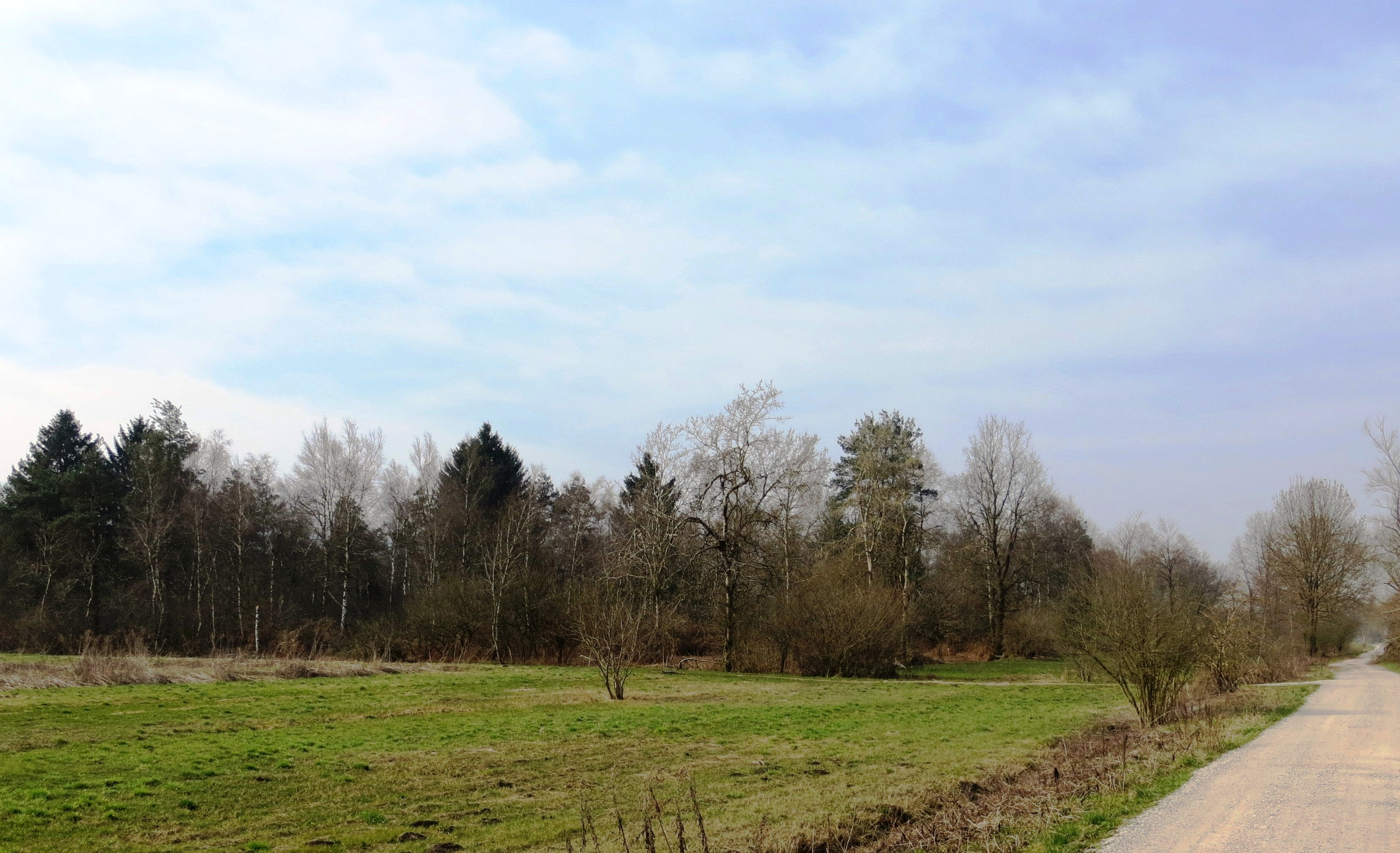
Kosler's Thicket in the Ljubljana Marsh

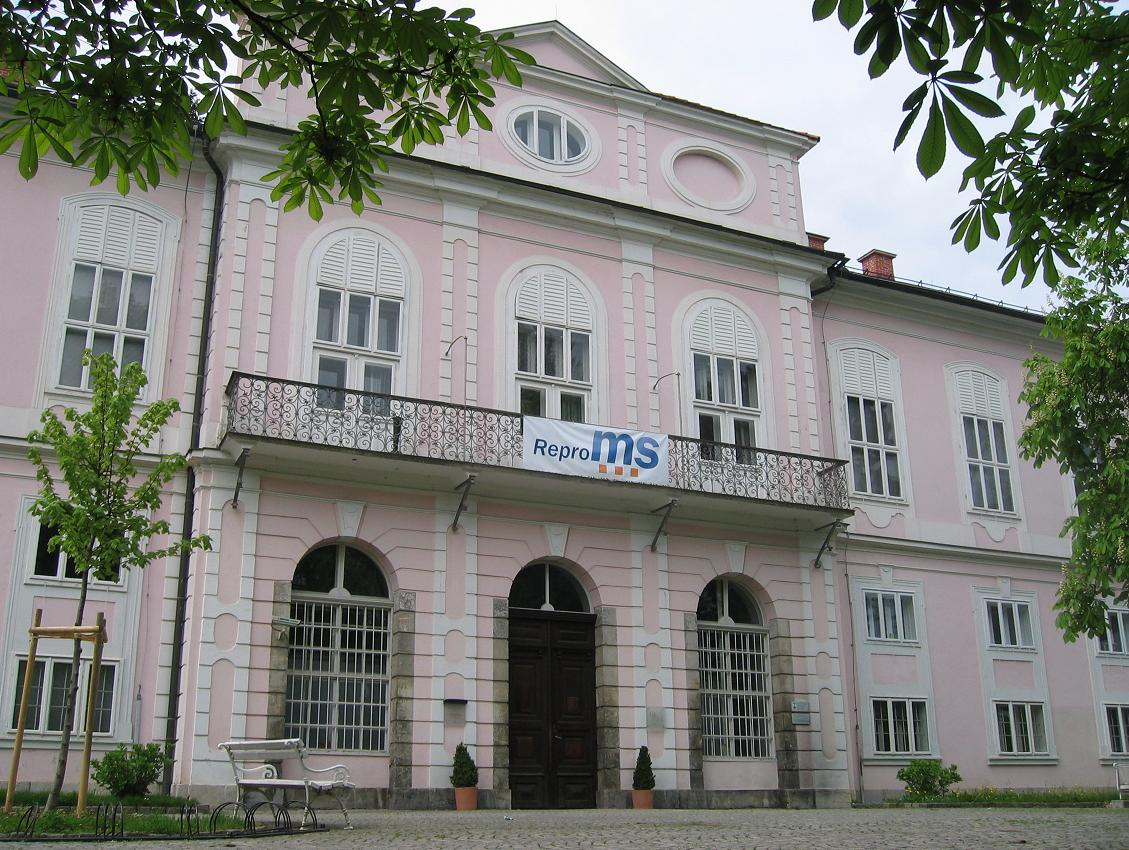
Kosler Mansion in Tivoli City Park (Ljubljana), now the National Museum of Contemporary History

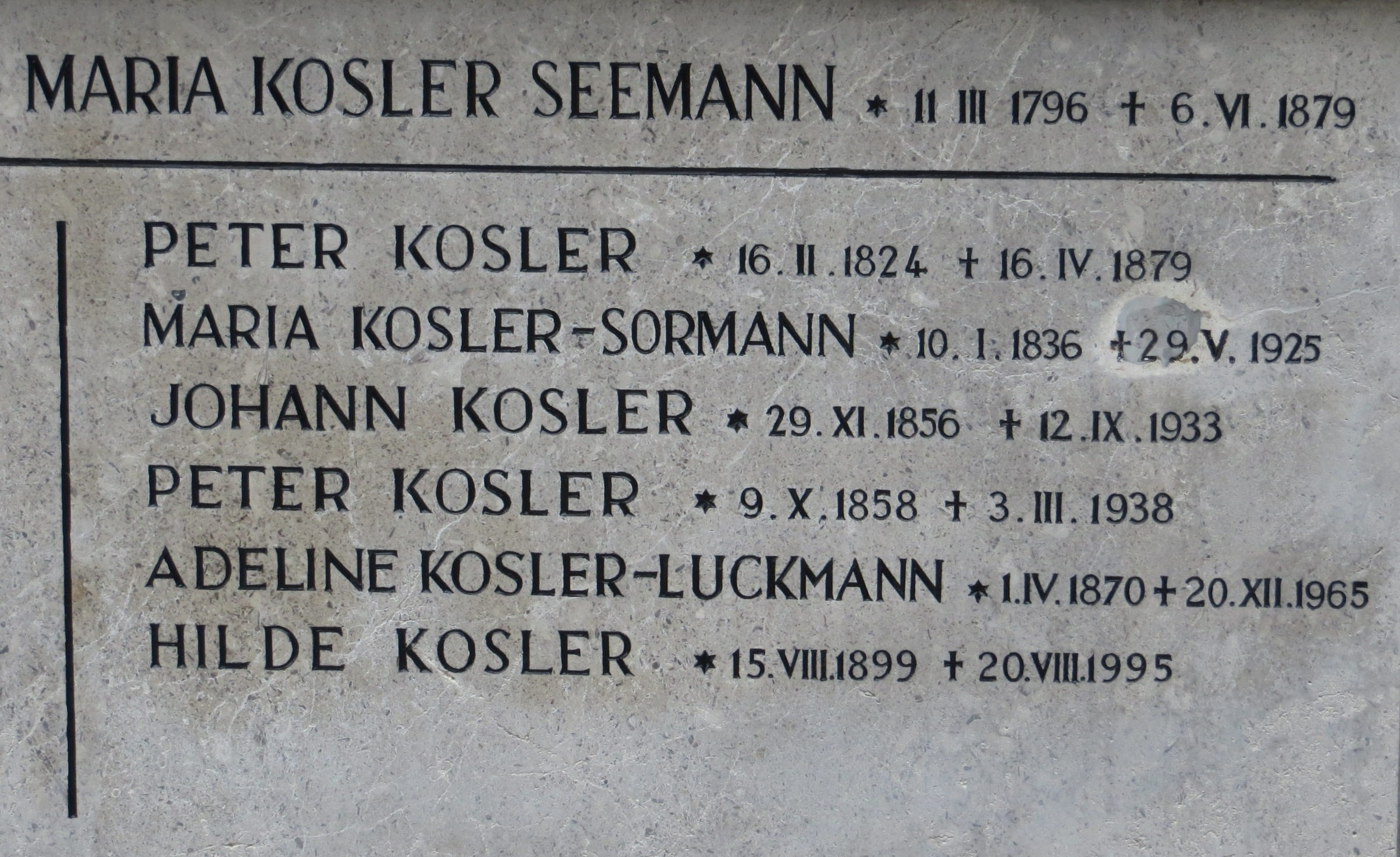
Kosler family grave (detail)

== See also ==
- United Slovenia
- National symbols of Slovenia
