= Koče, Kočevje =

Koče
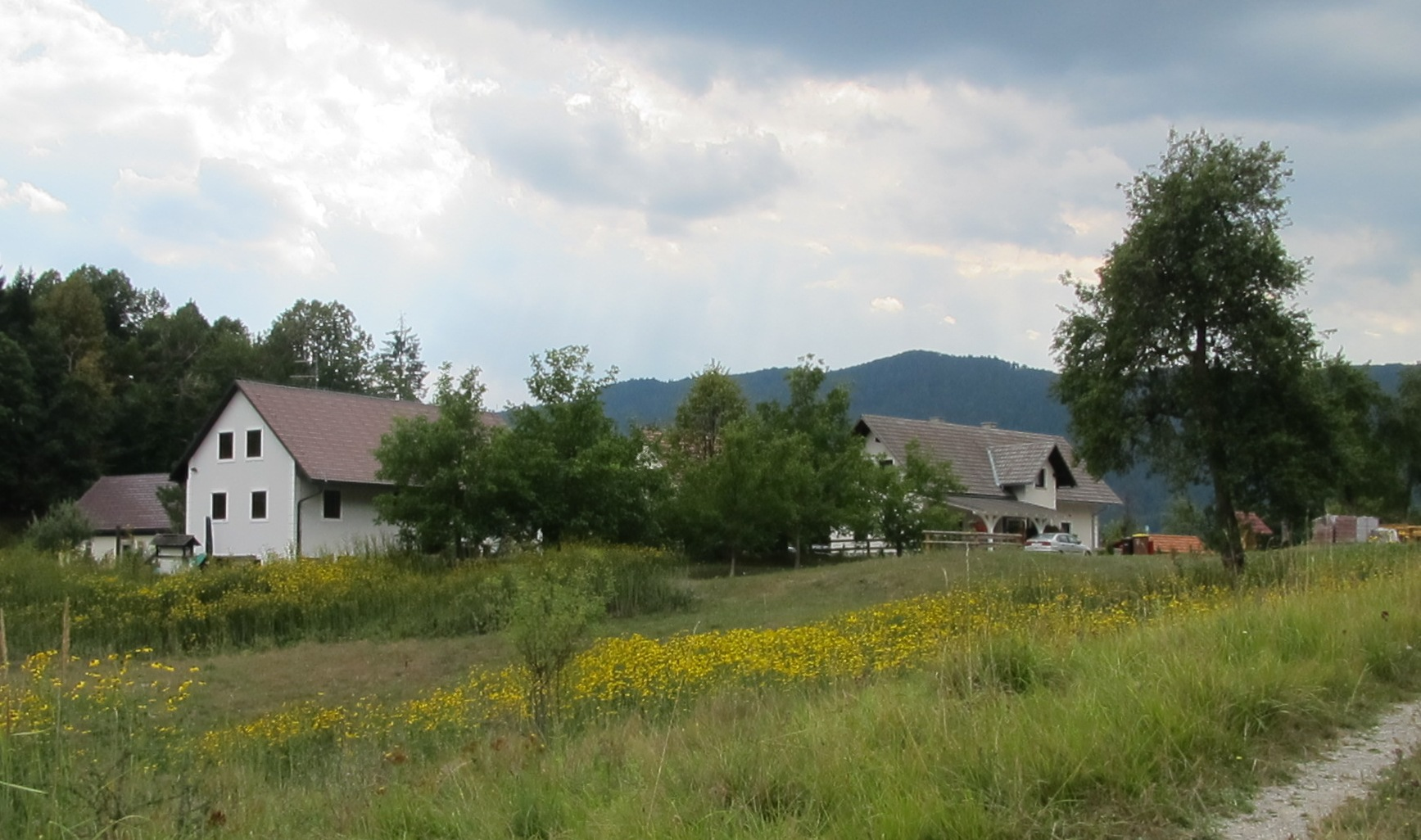
- Koče

- Location in Slovenia
- Coordinates: 45°35′52.39″N 14°48′7.44″E
- Country: Slovenia
- Traditional region: Lower Carniola
- Statistical region: Southeast Slovenia
- Municipality: Kočevje

Area
  - Total: 8.46 km^{2} (3.27 sq mi)
- Elevation: 593.4 m (1,947 ft)
- Postal code: 1330

Koče (pronounced [ˈkoːtʃɛ]; German: Kotschen) is a settlement in the hills south of Kočevje in southern Slovenia. The area is part of the traditional region of Lower Carniola and is now included in the Southeast Slovenia Statistical Region.

== Name ==
Koče was known as Kotchen in German and as Götschə or Gotsch in Gottscheerish. The name was first attested in 1498 as Kötschen and is believed to be derived from a plural form of the Slovene common noun koča '(small) house, shack' in reference to the modest dwellings of tenant farmers. The three villages of Primoži, Koče, and Mlaka pri Kočevski Reki were also referred to collectively in German as Fünfzehnhuben (literally, 'fifteen hides').

== History ==
The village of Koče had 30 houses and 129 residents in 1880. On 24 July 1882 a major fire started at the Jakob Wittreich barn at Koče no. 4; it spread and burned down 16 houses and 41 outbuildings in the village, also killing large numbers of livestock, although there were no human fatalities. By 1930 the population of Koče had fallen to 68, and 16 former houses were either vacant or had been torn down. On 28 and 19 November 1941, 48 Gottschee Germans were evicted from the village, leaving only 15 ethnic Slovenes living in 4 houses. After the Second World War, the village was in the Kočevska Reka restricted area and the last residents left the village in the 1980s. A signpost with historical and cultural information about the village and the Kočevje region in Slovene, German, and English was erected southwest of the village in October 2008.

== Church ==
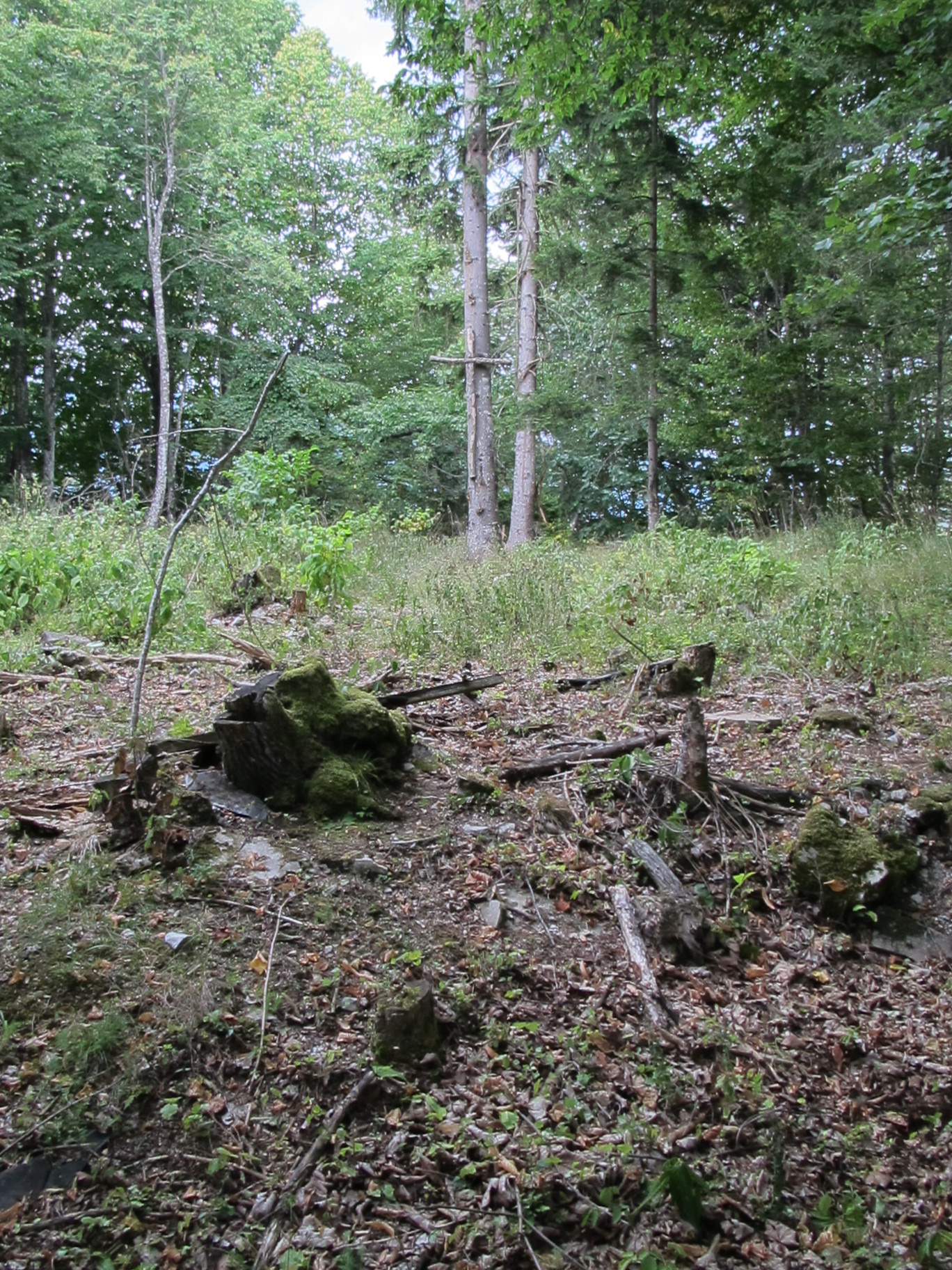
Church site and cross

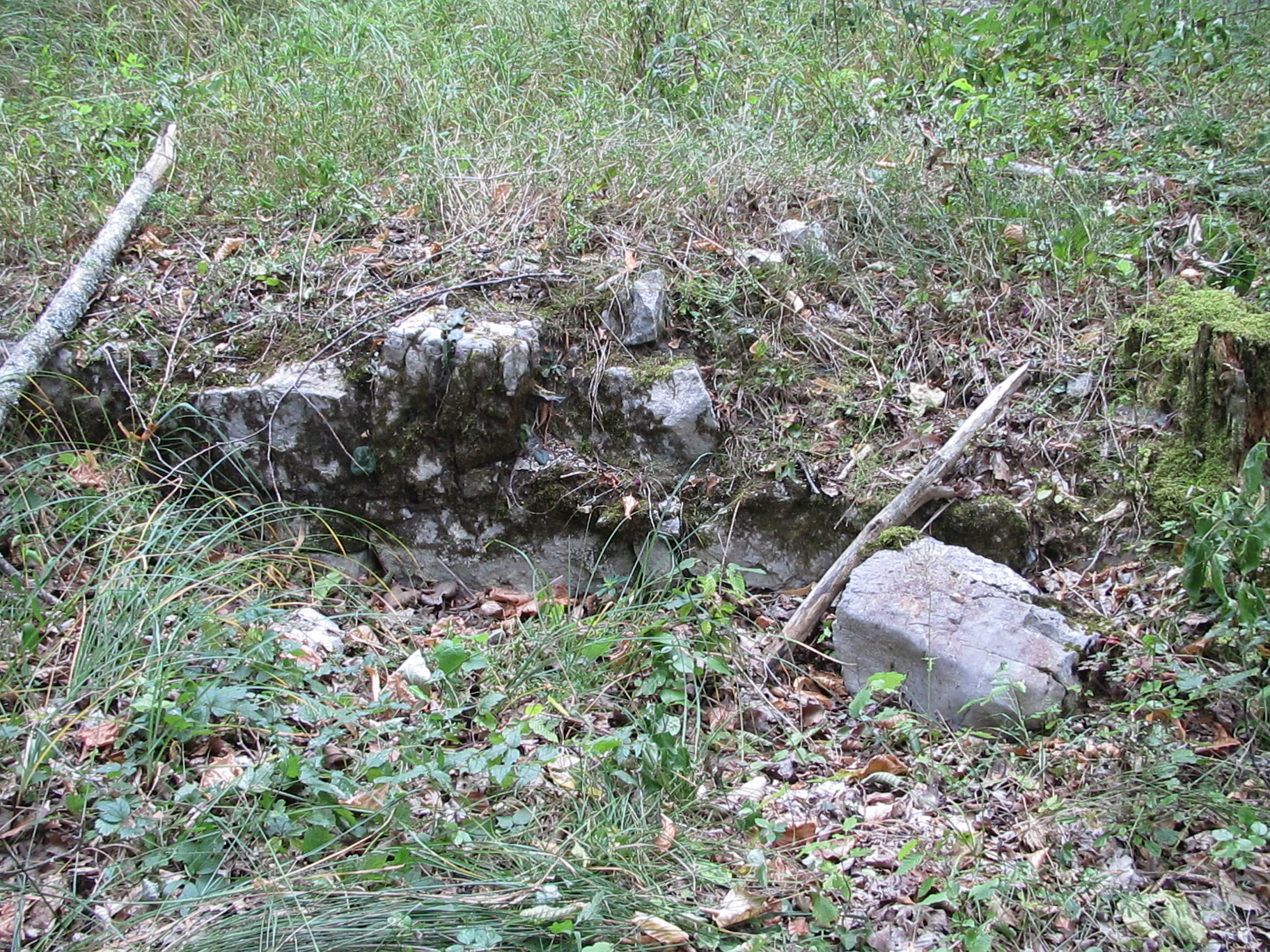
Church foundations

Assumption Church (destroyed)

The local church, dedicated to the Assumption of Mary, was a 16th-century chapel of ease that survived the Second World War, but was demolished in the 1950s. The church belonged to the Parish of Kočevska Reka. It stood on a hill at the southern edge of the village, with the altar facing the southeast. It had a long rectangular nave, a chancel of equal width, and a bell tower against the southwest wall. The church was listed in a list of ecclesiastic property dating to 1526 and in a report by the apostolic visitor Paulus Bisantius in 1581. The church was likely built at the end of the 15th century or beginning of the 16th century, originally with a shorter nave and a wooden belfry on the roof. The stone bell tower was probably built in the mid-18th century and the nave extended to the northwest no more than a century later. At this time new windows were built into the church and a tall pointed roof added to the bell tower. The church had a rectangular stone door casing with a window above it. The side entrance to the church also had a door casing built from parts of an older ogival door casing. The groin-vaulted sacristy was in the ground floor of the bell tower, and the church had a shingled gabled roof. The walls and vaulting were decorated with 17th-century frescoes. The art historian Marijan Zadnikar (1921–2005) wrote a complete description of the still intact church in 1947. The church was destroyed in 1953 or 1954 and only its foundations are visible today.

== Notable people ==
Notable people that were born or lived in Koče include:

- Peter Kosler (1824–1879), lawyer, geographer, cartographer, activist, and manufacturer

== Gallery ==
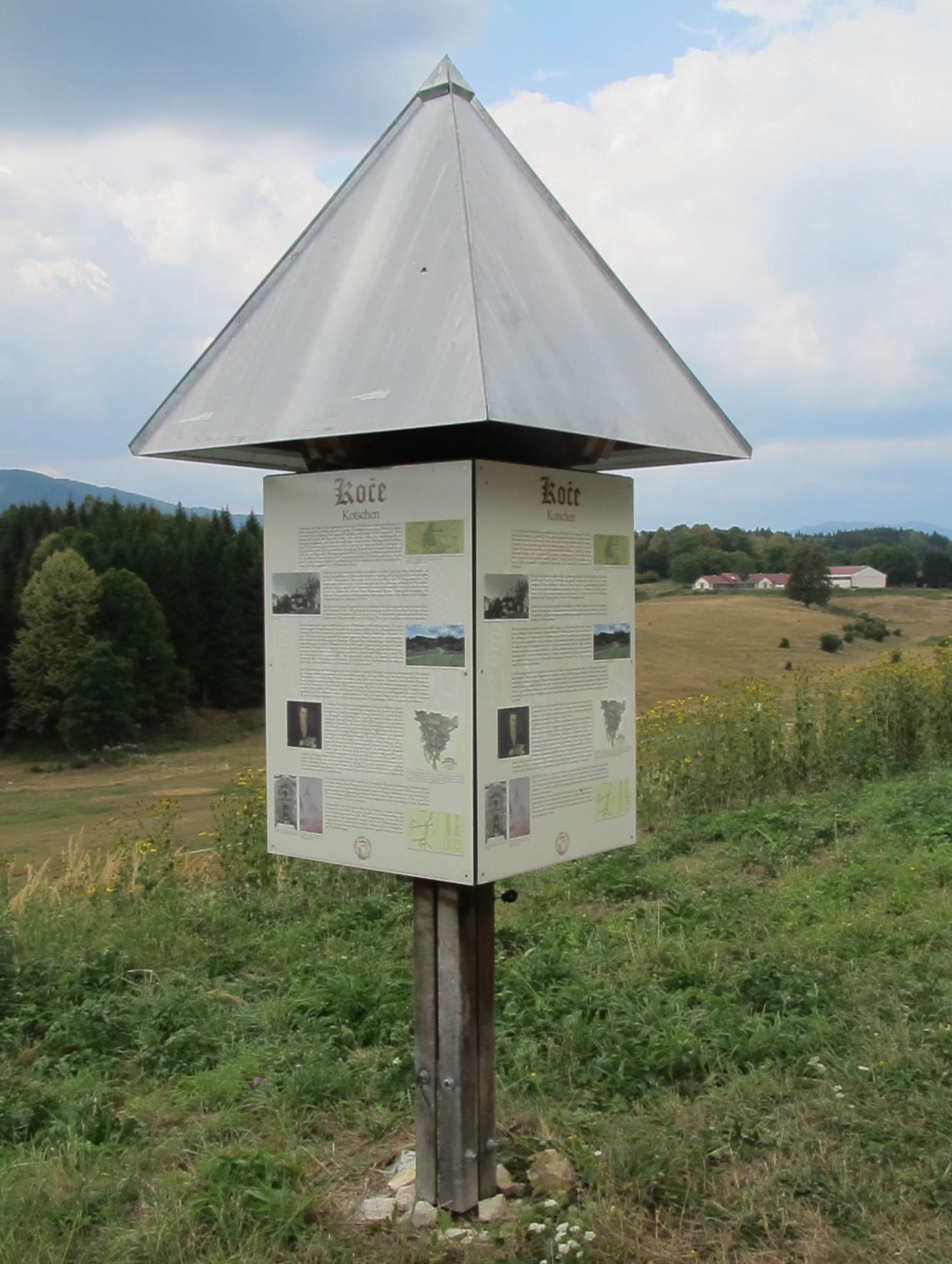
Information signpost

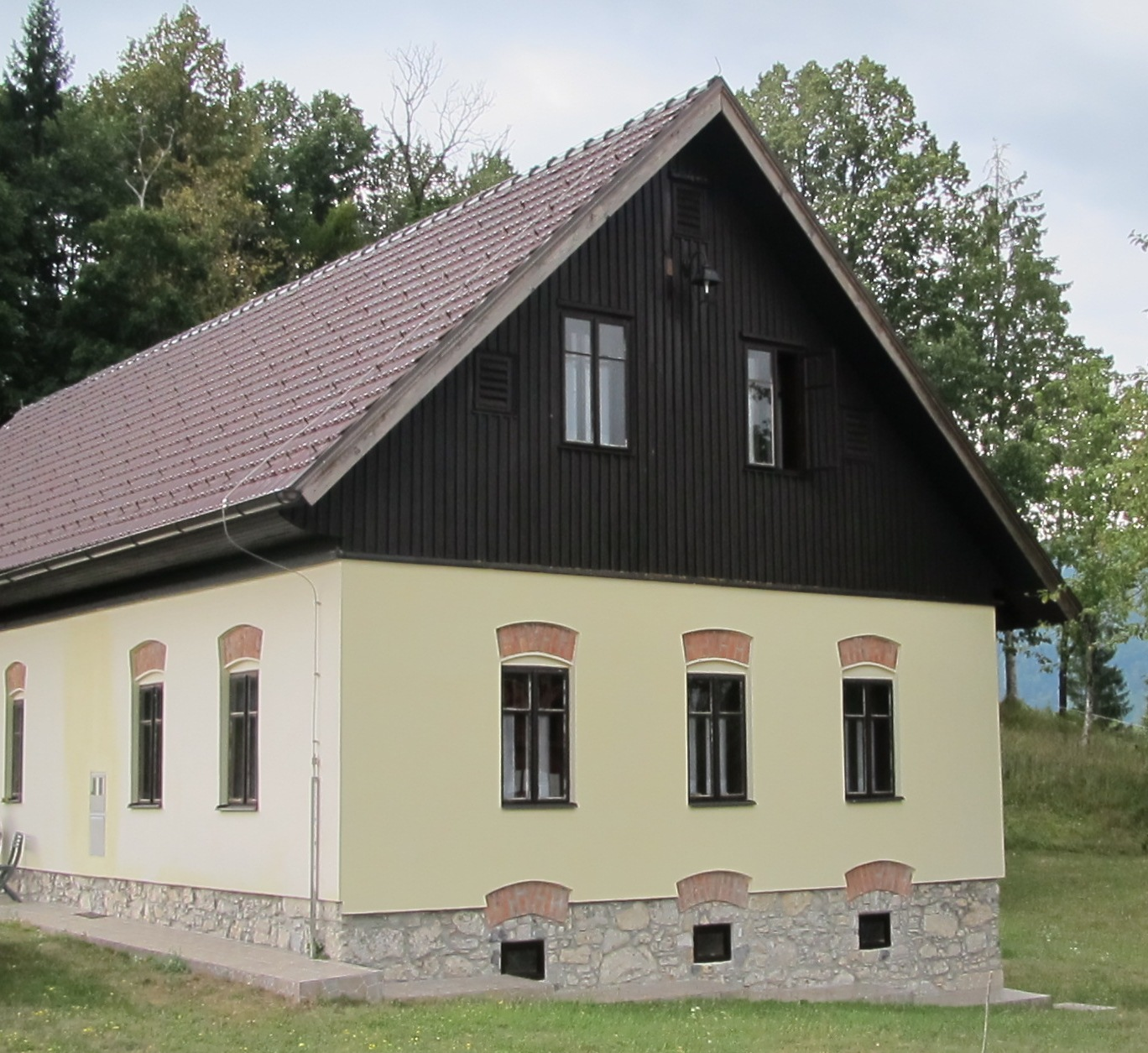
Kosler house

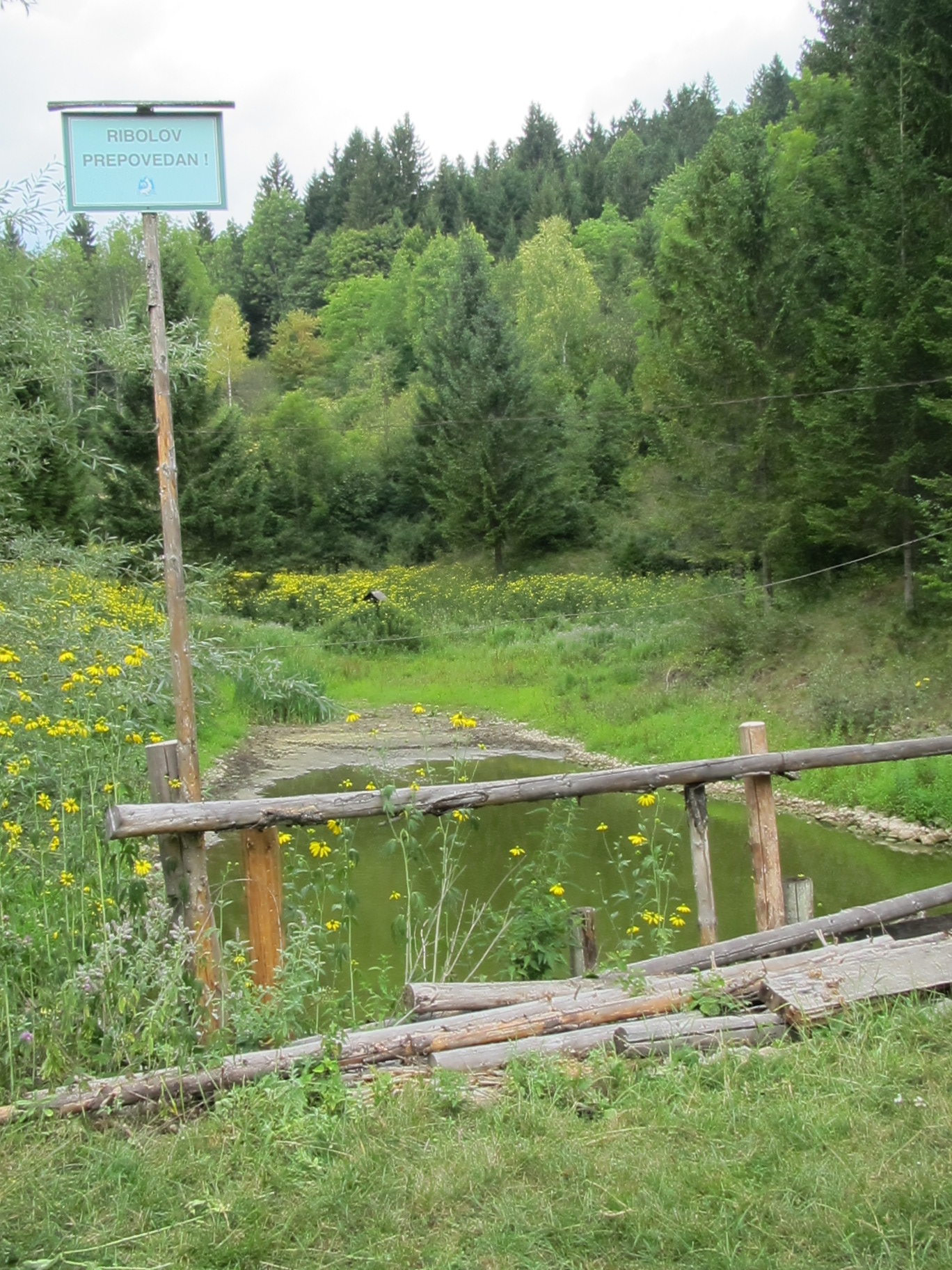
Village pond
