= Mlaka pri Kočevski Reki =

- Location in Slovenia
- Coordinates: 45°36′24.08″N 14°47′36.41″E
- Country: Slovenia
- Traditional region: Lower Carniola
- Statistical region: Southeast Slovenia
- Municipality: Kočevje

Area
  - Total: 17.45 km^{2} (6.74 sq mi)
- Elevation: 617.8 m (2,027 ft)

Population (2002)
  - Total: 27
- Postal code: 1338

Mlaka pri Kočevski Reki (pronounced [ˈmlaːka pɾi kɔˈtʃeːu̯ski ˈɾeːki]; German: Moos) is a settlement in the Municipality of Kočevje in southern Slovenia. The area is part of the traditional region of Lower Carniola and is now included in the Southeast Slovenia Statistical Region.

== Geography ==
Mlaka pri Kočevski Reki is a scattered settlement north of Primoži in an open valley, along a secondary road that is wooded on both sides. The soil is loamy and sandy. Surrounding hills include Roch's Head (Slovene: Rokova glava, 728 m) to the northeast, Sexton's Head (Cerkvenikova glava, 791 m) to the east, and Wood Hill (Lesna gorica, 686 m) to the west.

== Name ==
The name of the settlement was changed from Mlaka to Mlaka pri Kočevski Reki (literally, 'Mlaka near Kočevska Reka') in 1953. The three villages of Primoži, Koče, and Mlaka pri Kočevski Reki were also referred to collectively in German as Fünfzehnhuben (literally, 'fifteen hides').

== History ==
Mlaka pri Kočevski Reki was a village settled by Gottschee Germans. Historical records show that the village had one full farm and eight half-farms on 1498, and in 1574 the population included 10 owners of half-farms and three tenant farmers. Before the Second World War, the village had 33 houses. During the Second World War the original population of the village was evicted. After the war, most of the farmland was managed by the Snežnik collective farm.

== Cultural heritage ==
A late 19th-century chapel in the centre of the village, dedicated to Saint Roch, was demolished in 1953 or 1954.

== Economy ==
There was a sawmill in Mlaka.
