= Family Portrait =

Family Portrait may refer to:

== Portraiture painting ==
- Family Portrait (Hals, four persons), a 1635 painting by Frans Hals
- Family Portrait (Hals, five persons), a 1648 painting by Frans Hals
- Family Portrait (Kralj), a 1926 painting by France Kralj
- Portrait of the Family Hinlopen, a 1663 portrait by Metsu
- Portrait of the Vendramin Family, a 1540s portrait by Titian
- The Bellelli Family or Family Portrait, an 1860s portrait by Degas

== Photography ==
- Family Portrait (Voyager), a February 1990 image of the Solar System
- Family Portrait (MESSENGER), a November 2010 image of the Solar System

== Literature ==
- Family Portrait (novel), a 1976 novel by Graham Masterton
- "The Family Portraits", an 1813 story in Tales of the Dead

== Music ==
- Family Portrait (album), a 2018 album, or the title song, by Ross from Friends
- "Family Portrait" (song), a 2001 song by Pink
- "Family Portrait", a 1996 song by Rachel's from Music for Egon Schiele

== Stage and screen ==
- Family Portrait (1950 film), a film by Humphrey Jennings
- Family Portrait (2004 film), a Sundance Film Festival award winner
- Family Portrait (2023 film), a film by Lucy Kerr
- Family Portrait (play), a play revived in 1959 starring Ellen Demming
- "Family Portrait" (The Munsters episode), a 1964 episode of The Munsters
- "Family Portrait" (Modern Family), a 2010 episode of Modern Family
- "Family Portrait", a 2006 episode of Brothers and Sisters
