= Kosler's Map =

First map of the Slovene Lands

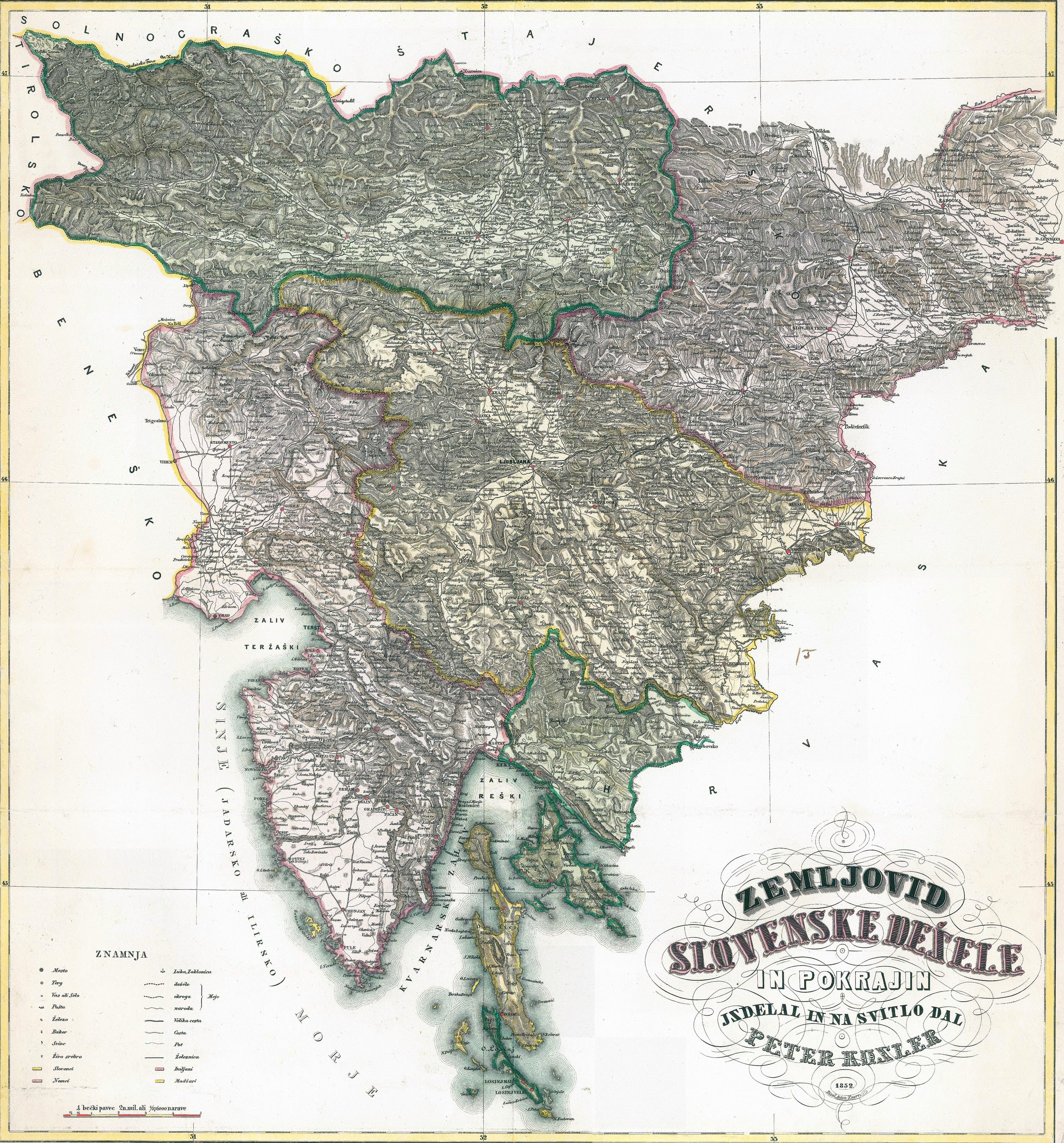
Zemljovid Slovenske dežele in pokrajin was the first map of Slovene ethnic territory.

Zemljovid Slovenske dežele in pokrajin (Map of the Slovene Land and Provinces, commonly known as Kosler's Map), made from 1848 until 1852 during the Spring of Nations by the Carniolan lawyer and geographer Peter Kosler, was the first map of the Slovene Lands. It had a format of 50 by 55 centimetres (20 in × 22 in) and a scale of 1:576,000. It was also the first Slovene map with all the text written in Gaj's Latin alphabet. August Knorr printed the map in 1852, with the planned publication in January 1853, but the Austrian military authorities confiscated his output; the map first became available to the public only in 1861 in Vienna. Kosler was also briefly imprisoned by the Austrian authorities for this reason.

Old maps similar to Kosler's Map are included in the ICOM Red List of Cultural Objects at Risk of illicit traffic and looting.
