= Tivoli City Park =

Park in Ljubljana, Slovenia

- Mestni park Tivoli
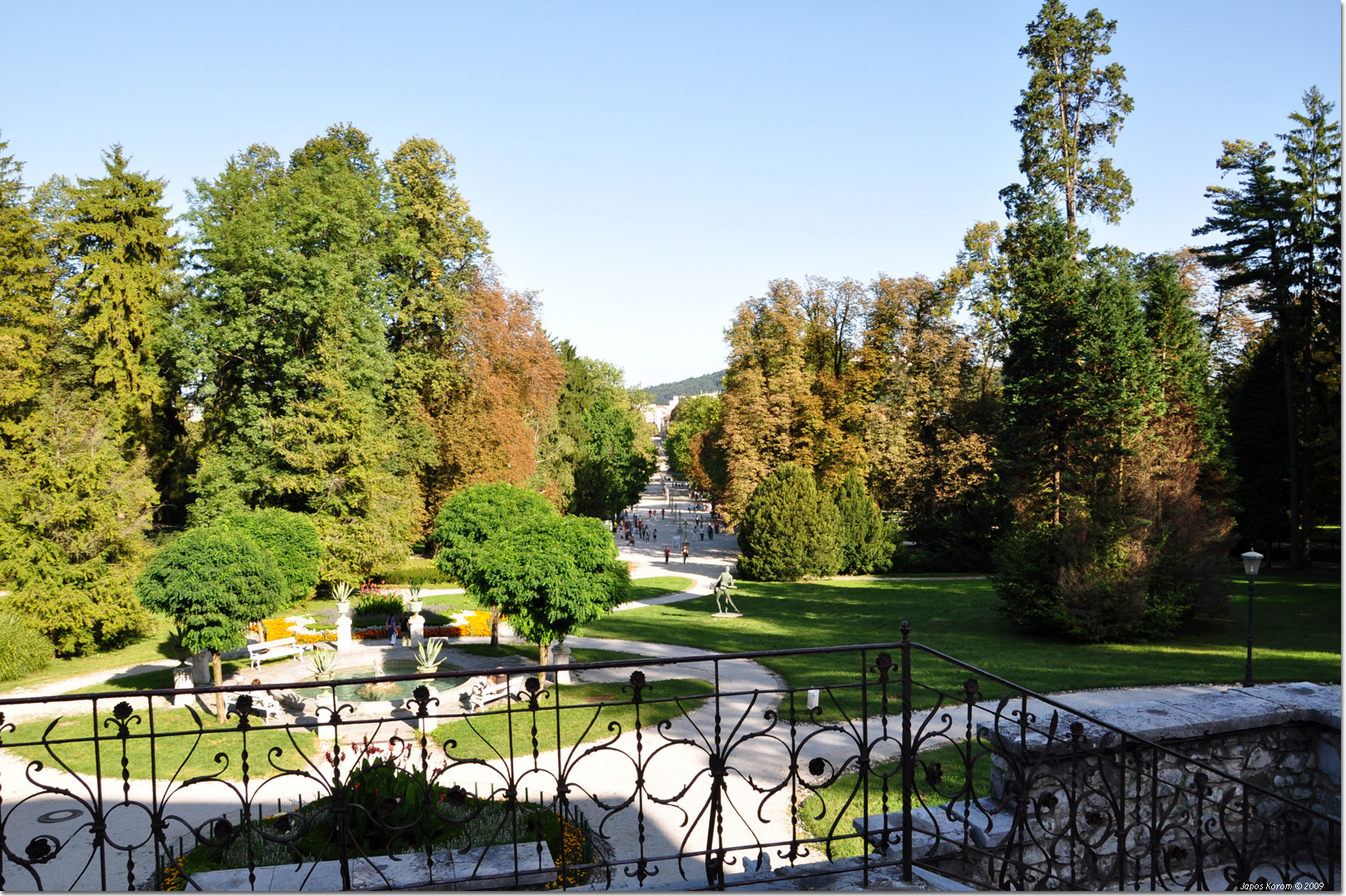
- View from Tivoli Castle

- Location within Slovenia
- Location: Ljubljana, Slovenia
- Coordinates: 46°3′14″N 14°29′48″E

Tivoli City Park (Slovene: Mestni park Tivoli) or simply Tivoli Park (Park Tivoli) is the largest park in Ljubljana, the capital of Slovenia. It is located on the western outskirts of the Center District, stretching to the Šiška District to the north, the Vič District to the south, and the Rožnik District to the west. Several notable buildings and art works stand in the park. Since 1984, the park has been protected as part of Tivoli–Rožnik Hill–Šiška Hill Nature Park. It is home to a variety of bird species.

== Landmarks ==
=== Architecture ===
Tivoli Castle

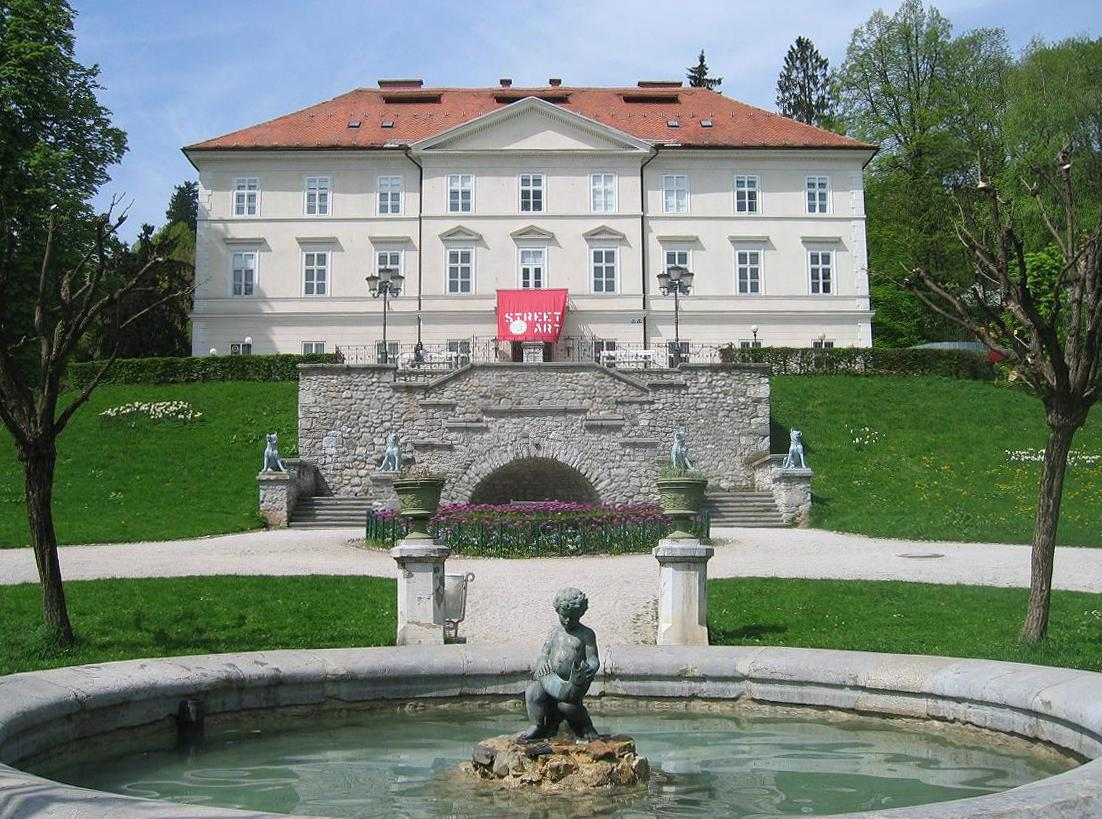
Tivoli Castle with the fountain Deček z ribo (Boy with a Fish), a 1989 reconstruction of a Baroque fountain from 1870. The castle is guarded by four cast-iron dogs, designed by an unknown sculptor in a Moravian foundry.

Tivoli Castle is a mansion and is the terminus of the Jakopič Promenade. Built in the 17th century atop the ruins of a previous Renaissance-period castle, the mansion was initially owned by the Jesuits. In the middle of the 19th century, it was renovated by Marshal Joseph Radetzky (1766–1858) in the Neoclassical style, giving it its present appearance. In 1864, Austrian sculptors in a Moravian foundry designed four cast-iron dogs that stand in front of the castle. In some older books they were attributed to the sculptor Anton Dominik Fernkorn (1813–1878). Because the dogs do not have tongues, it has been falsely rumoured that the sculptor Fernkorn committed suicide by shooting himself due to this mistake.

Švicarija Mansion

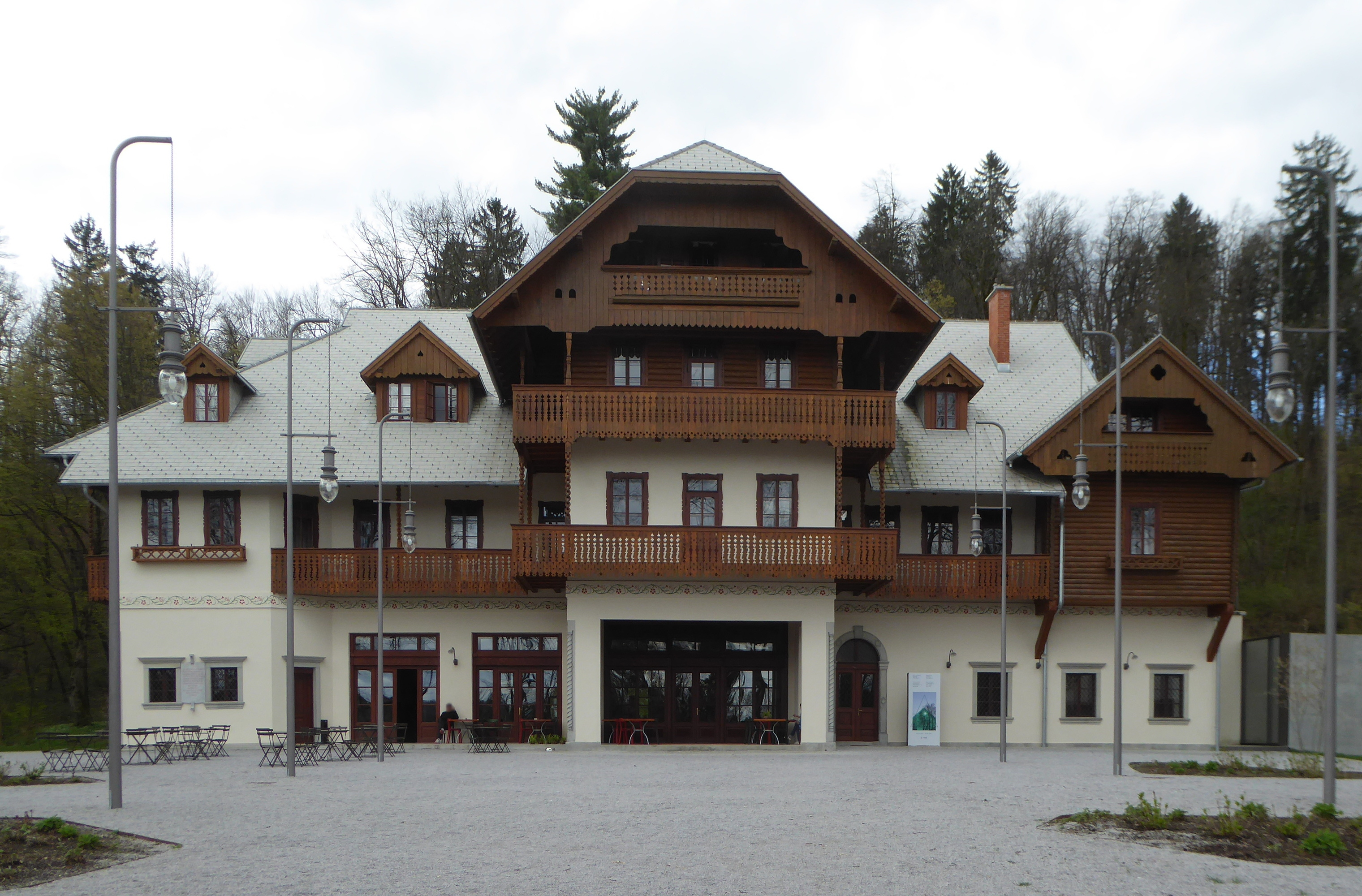
Švicarija Mansion

An alpine-style building called the Švicarija ("Swissery", formerly the Hotel Tivoli) stands behind Tivoli Castle. It was completely restored in recent years and has now been transformed into a cultural centre. The Jesenko nature trail leads past it.

Cekin Mansion

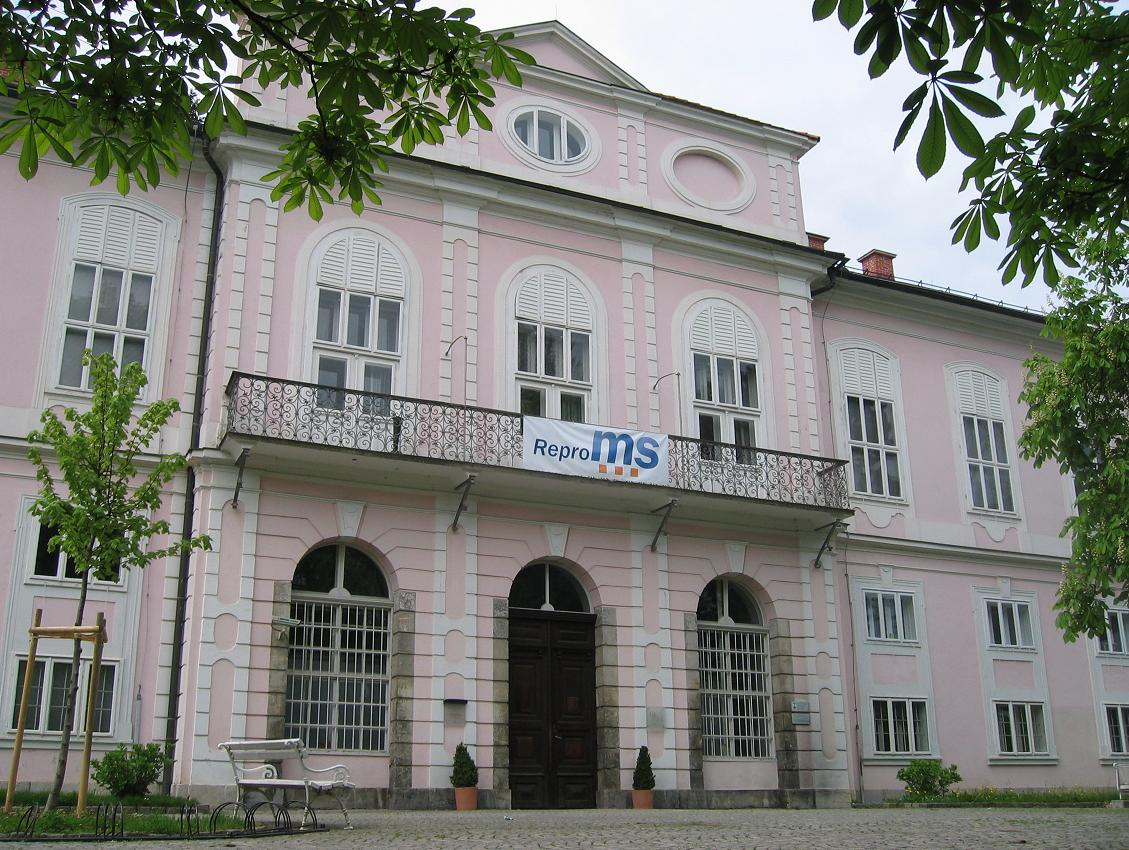
The Cekin Mansion

Cekin Mansion is a mansion on the northern edge of Tivoli Park. It houses the Museum of Contemporary History of Slovenia (Muzej novejše zgodovine Slovenije). The mansion was built in 1720, commissioned by Leopold Lamberg and based on plans by the Viennese Baroque architect Fischer von Erlach. Since 1951, it has housed the national museum of contemporary history.

Tivoli Hall

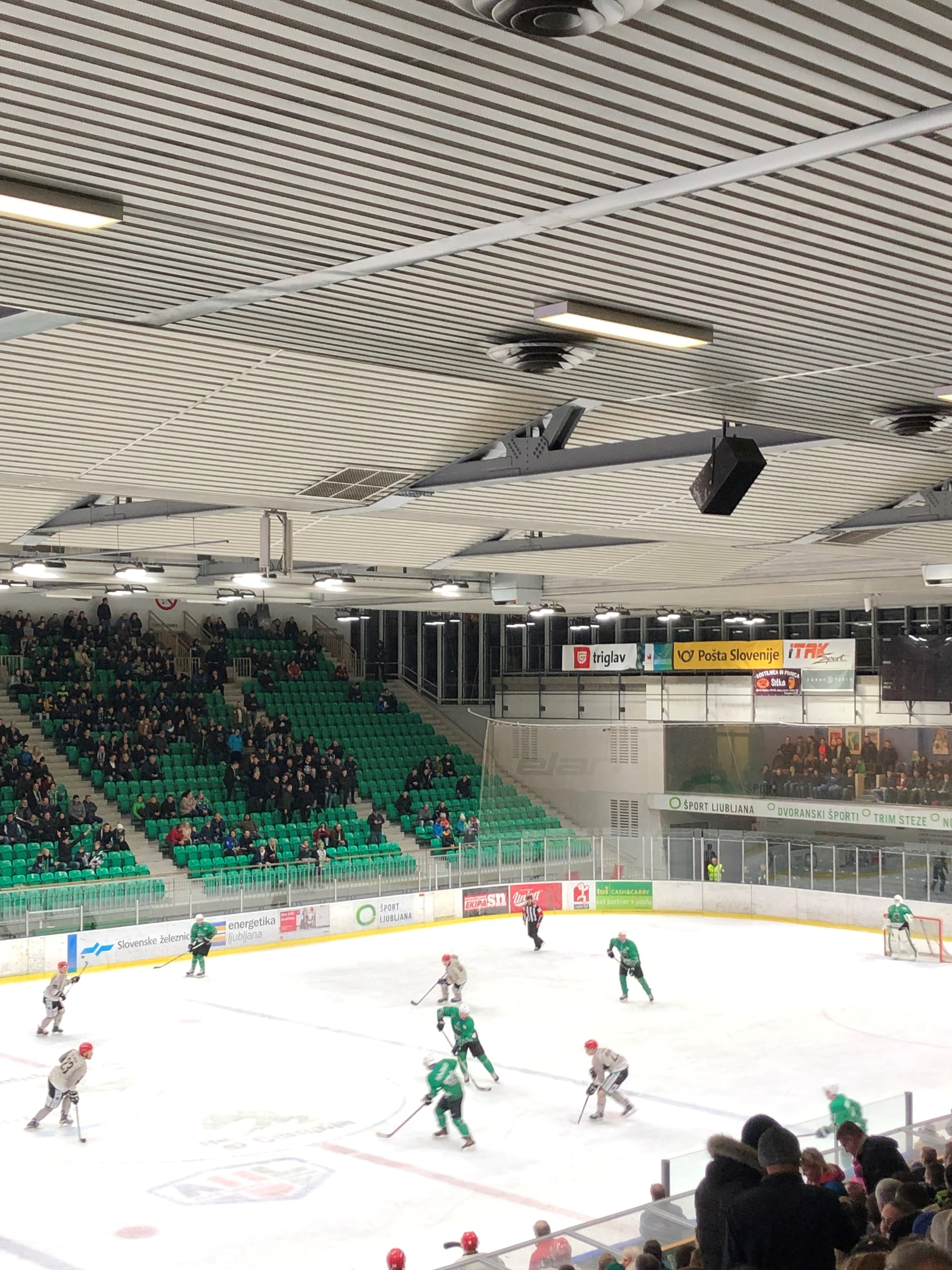
Tivoli Hall

Tivoli Hall is a complex of two multipurpose indoor sport arenas next to the Cekin Mansion. The complex, based on plans by the architect Marjan Božič and the engineer Stanko Bloudek, was opened in 1965. The larger ice hockey arena has a seating capacity of 7,000 people. When configured to host basketball games, the capacity is adjusted to 6,000. The smaller basketball hall has a seating capacity of 4,500 people. This hall hosted home games of the professional basketball team KK Union Olimpija until 2011, while the larger one is the home of HDD Olimpija Ljubljana professional ice hockey club.

Tivoli Pond

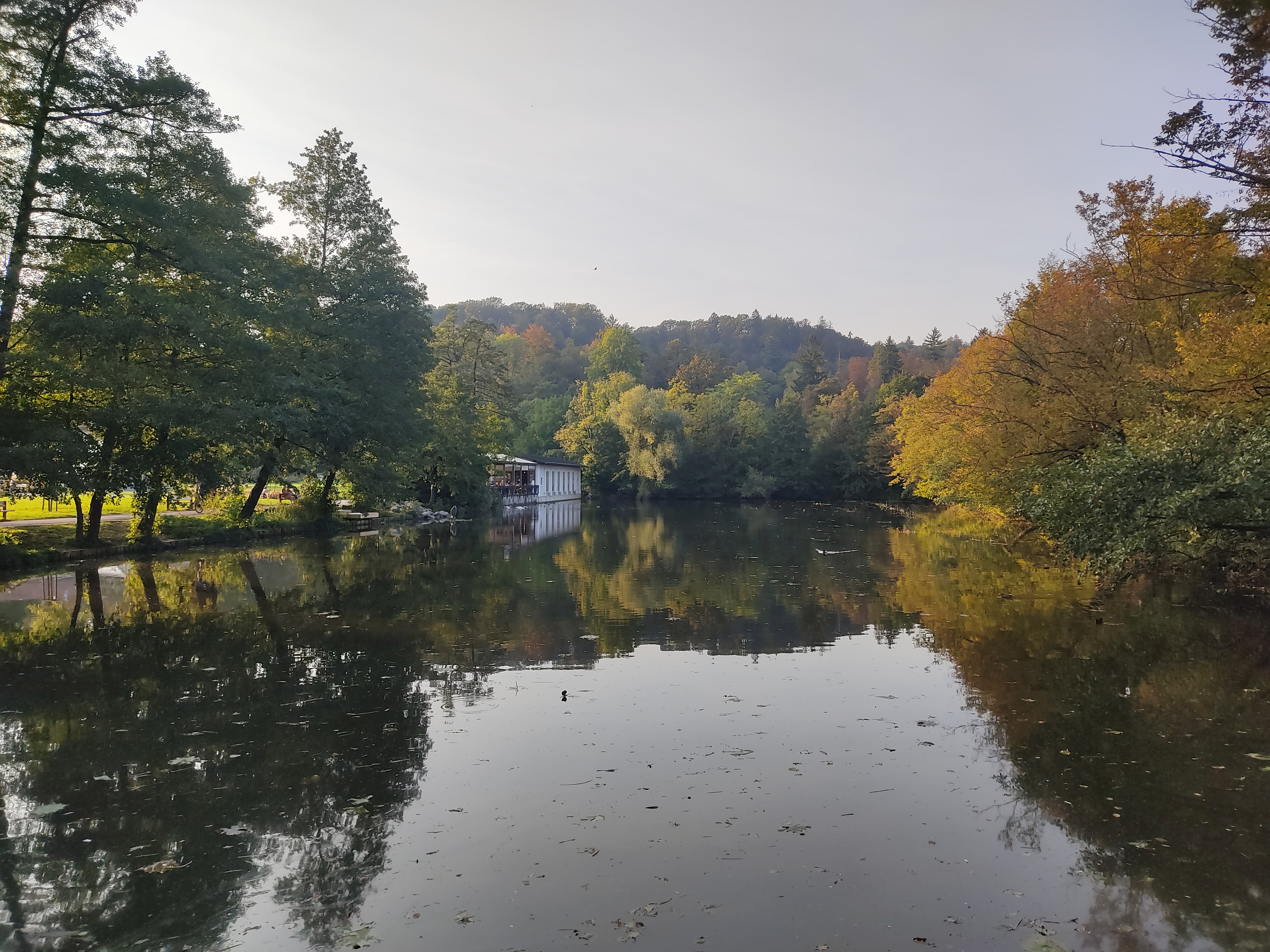
Tivoli Pond in late spring. View towards the north, with Rožnik Hill in the background.

At the southeastern end of Tivoli Park is located Tivoli Pond (Slovene: Tivolski ribnik). The pond is shaped like a rectangle and is shallow with a small volume. In 2011, it was thoroughly renovated. It has been used for recreation, fishing, and as a flood-control reservoir. It has served as a theme of visual artists and musicians. There is a small stone plastic named Ribe ("Fish") in the pond. It is a depiction of two vertically standing fish, created in 1935 by the expressionist sculptor France Kralj and erected in 1994. On a lawn beside the pond, an open-air library operates in warm weather and a workshop on recycling books and other printed matter, called "The Read Ones." During winter, the library moves into the nearby greenhouse.

Greenhouse and rose garden

A greenhouse with tropical plants, operated by the Ljubljana Botanical Gardens, stands near the northwestern end of the pond. Next to the greenhouse, there is a rose garden. It was created from 1993 to 1994 and renovated in 2007. Over 160 types of roses, including the first Slovenian cultivar, "Prešeren", were added in 2010. All of them have been designated with a plate.

Playground

From February 1941 to July 1943, during the Italian annexation of Ljubljana, the park near the pond was arranged based on plans by the architect Boris Kobe. He put a playground inside a circular design connected to the pond as the central landscape feature. The playground, named Paradiso dei bambini (Children's Paradise), was completed with the financial help of Emilio Grazioli, the first High Commissioner of the Province of Ljubljana. It opened with a ceremony on 11 July 1943 that was attended by numerous residents of Ljubljana, the mayor of Ljubljana, Leon Rupnik, and the high commissioner, Giuseppe Lombrassa, and included the blessing by the Ljubljana archbishop Gregorij Rožman. The event happened during the "cultural silence" period, a halt to all cultural activities connected with the annexation, ordered by the Slovene Liberation Front. The Communist Party and the Ljubljana Liberation Front secretary Vladimir Krivic characterised it as a "scandal" for their movement.

=== Sculptures ===
Near the northern end of the pond, at the top of a staircase leading towards Tivoli Castle, stands a bronze sculpture by Zdenko Kalin, named Pastirček ("Shepherd") or Deček s piščalko ("Boy with a Whistle"). It was created in 1942 and erected 1 May 1946. It is a bucolic full-length statue of a marching boy with a whistle and represents one of the peaks of Slovene figurative art.

In 2000, the Bosnian sculptor Slobodan Pejić transformed a 300-year-old oak tree that fell in a storm into a sculpture named Sožitje ("Coexistence"). With the act, he proposed the beginning of a sculpture garden in the park. The sculpture is a rare combination of oak and bronze. It is 4 metres (13 ft) high and it has been grown over by moss and by lichen. The wood embraces a bronze inner part named Čisto srce ("Pure Heart").

In September 2004, on the occasion of the centenary of his birth, a sitting statue of the poet, writer, and translator Edvard Kocbek was ceremonially unveiled in the immediate vicinity of the pond on its southern side. It is a bronze statue by the sculptor Boštjan Drinovec. The poet sits on a bank and looks at his 30 cm (12 in) double on a handhold of the bank.

== History ==
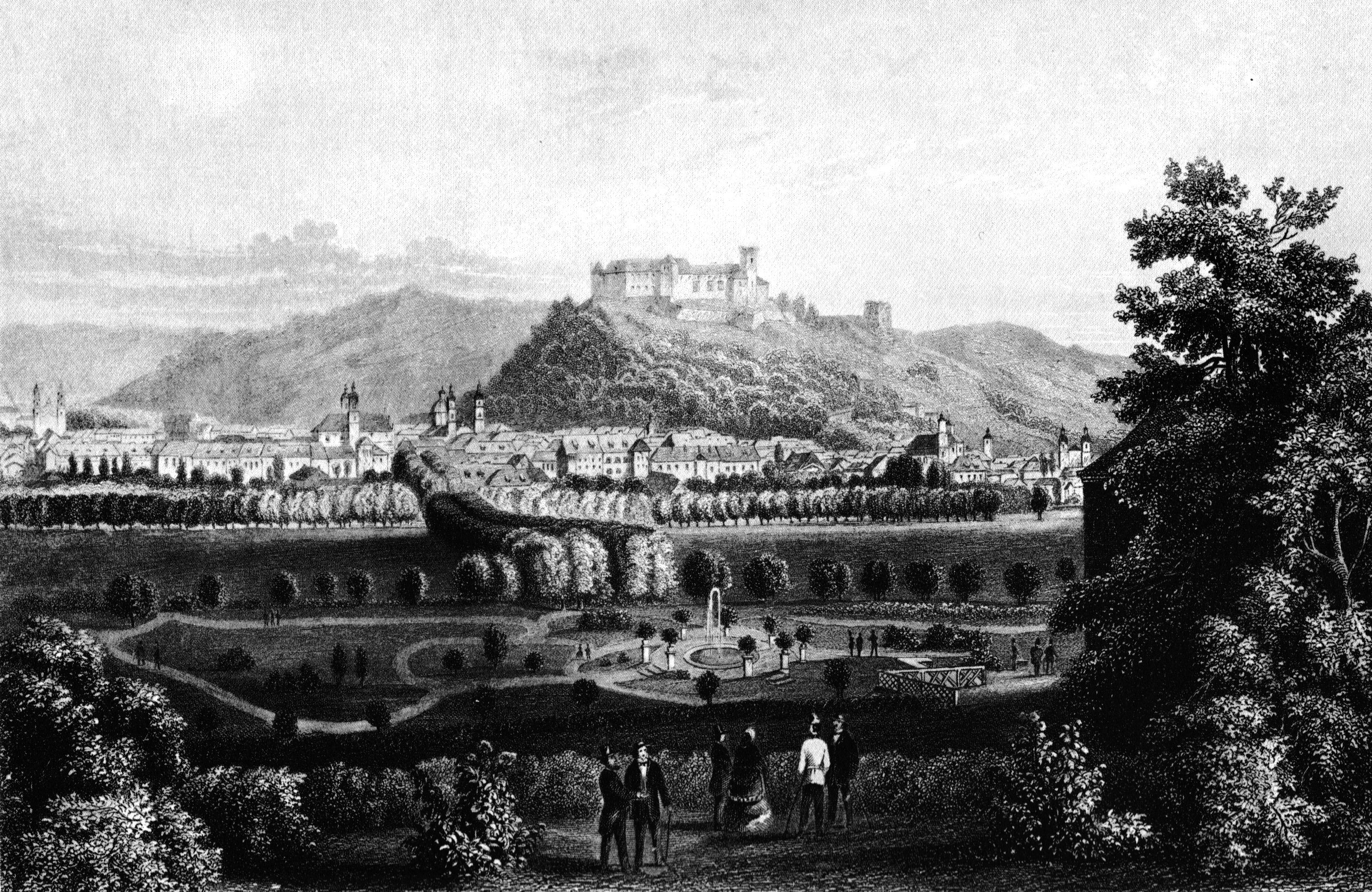
Tivoli Park area around 1850

Tivoli Park was laid out upon the plans by the engineer Jean Blanchard in 1813, when Ljubljana was the capital of the French Illyrian Provinces. He joined two existing parks, around Tivoli Castle (at that time called Podturn Manor) and around Cekin Mansion, and linked them to the Ljubljana downtown. The park was named in the second half of the 19th century after a summer residence of the Casino Society with an amusement park, a pub and a cafe, which was opened in 1835 next to Podturn Manor.

The pond was excavated in 1880. It was later used for boating and ice skating, and for fishing. A tree nursery was established in the park by the city municipality in 1894. It was led by the Czech gardener Vaclav Hejnic, who was the first professional gardener in Tivoli, and who arranged parts of the park in the 1920s. In the same time, the park was also renovated by the architect Jože Plečnik, who designed the Jakopič Promenade that runs through the park, creating a linear visual axis going from Tivoli Castle through Cankar Street and Čop Street to Prešeren Square, over the Triple Bridge, and ending at Ljubljana Castle.
