= Primoži =

Primoži Handlerji (until 1953)
- Location in Slovenia
- Coordinates: 45°36′0.74″N 14°47′26.8″E
- Country: Slovenia
- Traditional region: Lower Carniola
- Statistical region: Southeast Slovenia
- Municipality: Kočevje

Area
  - Total: 3.71 km^{2} (1.43 sq mi)
- Elevation: 582.8 m (1,912 ft)

Population (2002)
  - Total: 9
- Postal code: 1338

Primoži (pronounced [ˈpɾiːmɔʒi]; German: Handlern, Gottscheerish: Handlarə) is a small settlement in the Municipality of Kočevje in southern Slovenia. The area is part of the traditional region of Lower Carniola and is now included in the Southeast Slovenia Statistical Region.

== Name ==
The German name Handlern—and the Slovene name Handlerji, based on it—are both plural forms, derived from a surname. The Slovene name of the settlement was changed from Handlerji (previously also Handlarji) to Primoži in 1953. The name was changed on the basis of the 1948 Law on Names of Settlements and Designations of Squares, Streets, and Buildings as part of efforts by Slovenia’s postwar communist government to remove German elements from toponyms. The three villages of Primoži, Koče, and Mlaka pri Kočevski Reki were also referred to collectively in German as Fünfzehnhuben (literally, 'fifteen hides').

== History ==
Primoži was a Gottschee German village. In 1498 the village consisted of two full farms and six half-farms. The land registry of 1574 shows that the two full farms were also subdivided and that two tenant farmers were also living in the settlement. At that time the population was between 45 and 55. In 1770 there were 20 houses in the settlement. Before the Second World War it had 31 houses and a population of 84. The economy of the village was based on farming, gathering berries, and hauling sawn lumber and logs. The original German inhabitants of Primoži were evicted in November 1941, after which their houses stood empty and began to deteriorate.

== Religious heritage ==
- Primoži had a chapel dedicated to Our Lady of Lourdes and the Sacred Heart.
- A column shrine stands southwest of the main part of the settlement. It is a baroque structure with a square hip roof. It has semicircular niches.

== Other cultural heritage ==
Primoži has a walled collection area around a spring feeding a karst stream. It was built in the second half of the nineteenth century and is closed with a gate. Next to the spring is a rectangular concrete watering trough. It stands in a small karst valley.
