= Cekin Mansion =

Mansion in Ljubljana, Slovenia

Coordinates: 46°3′32.63″N 14°29′42.85″E

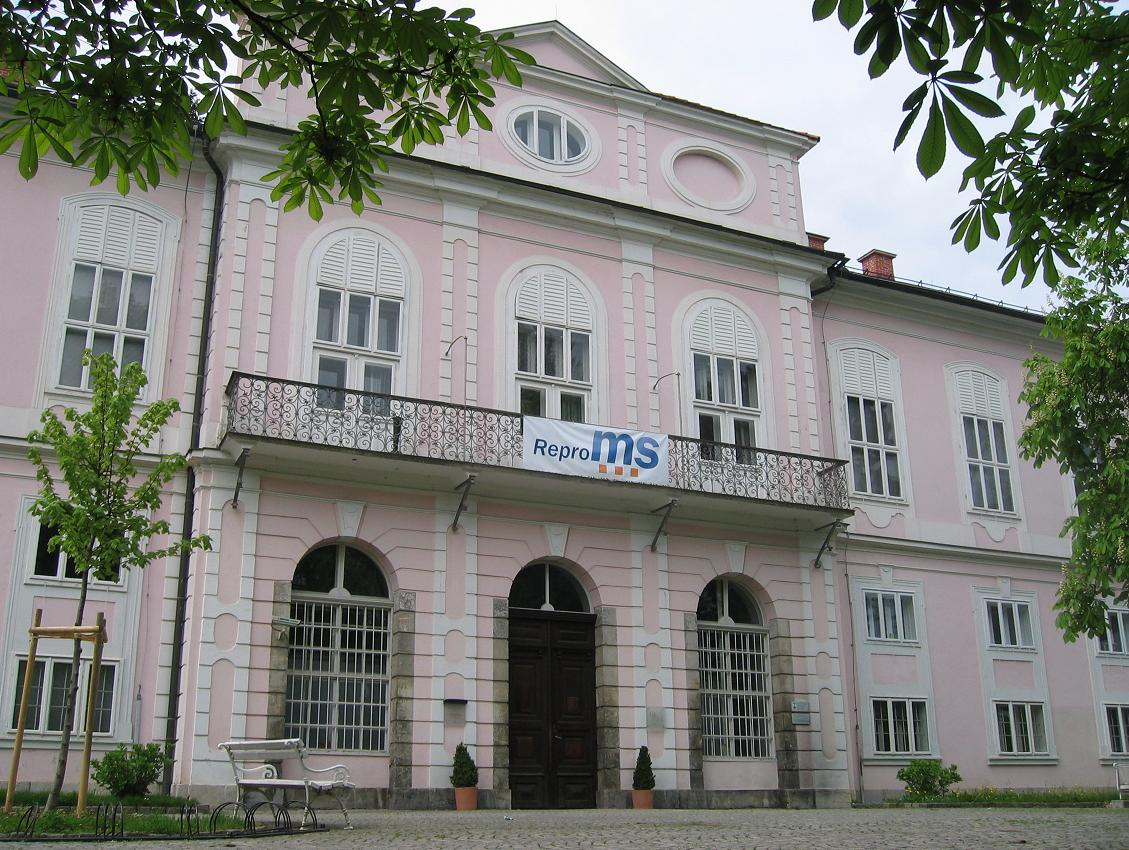
Cekin Mansion in Tivoli City Park, Ljubljana

Cekin Mansion (Slovene: Cekinov grad, German: Leopoldsruhe) is a mansion on the northern edge of Tivoli Park in Ljubljana, the capital of Slovenia. It is located next to Tivoli Hall in the Šiška District. It houses the Museum of Contemporary History of Slovenia (Muzej novejše zgodovine Slovenije).

== Name ==
The mansion is named after Lőrincz (or Laurenz) Szőgyény (1741–1805), the husband of Ivana Lamberg, who was given the building. The name Szőgyény was Slovenized by the townspeople into Cekin.

== History ==
The mansion was commissioned in 1720 by Leopold Lamberg based on plans by the Viennese Baroque architect Fischer von Erlach. During the last years of the French administration of Ljubljana from 1812 to 1813, it was used as a temporary residence by Eugène de Beauharnais, the viceroy of Italy and the commander of the Napoleonic armies in the Illyrian Provinces. In the mid-19th century, the mansion was purchased by the Gottschee German–Slovenian Peter Kosler, who lived there until his death. After World War II, the mansion was nationalized by the communist authorities of the People's Republic of Slovenia. From 1990 to 1992, the mansion was renovated by the engineer Jurij Kobe, who also added a communication tower. For his work, he received the Plečnik Award, the most prestigious Slovenian award in architecture.

== Museum ==
Since 1951, the mansion has housed the Museum of Contemporary History. The museum includes collections from World War I, the interwar period, World War II, postwar Yugoslavia, and independent Slovenia. This includes many historical items, including archives, artworks, and photographs.
