= Family Portrait (Kralj) =

1926 painting by France Kralj

- Družinski portret (Slovene)
- Artist: France Kralj
- Year: 1926
- Medium: oil on canvas
- Dimensions: 115.5 cm × 130.3 cm (45.5 in × 51.3 in)
- Location: Museum of Modern Art; Ljubljana

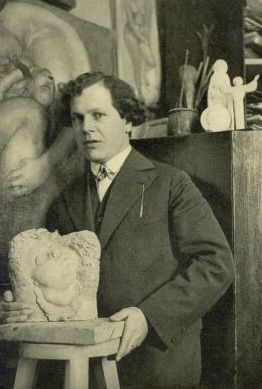
France Kralj in 1929

Family Portrait (Slovene: Družinski portret) is a painting by the artist France Kralj (1895—1960). Kralj painted the picture in 1926.

== Description ==
The size of the painting is 115.5 cm by 130.3 cm. The painting is in the Museum of Modern Art in Ljubljana.

== Analysis ==
The title of the painting in Slovene is Družinski portret. The painting shows Kralj, his wife, and his child. They are leaving his studio after work. The painting is an example of the New Objectivity style of art in Slovenia.

There are two special things about the painting. First, the painting shows the artist's personal life. Kralj did not usually use his personal life as a subject for paintings. In this painting, there is no emotional or sentimental part element. This is usual in paintings of the New Objectivity style. They showed concrete people and objects without their qualities or symbolism.

Second, the painting shows a sculpture in the part of the picture that is nearest to and in front of the viewer. The sculpture is a finished work. It is a sculpture of his wife and child.
