= Tivoli Castle =

Mansion in Ljubljana, Slovenia

Coordinates: 46°3′17″N 14°29′35″E

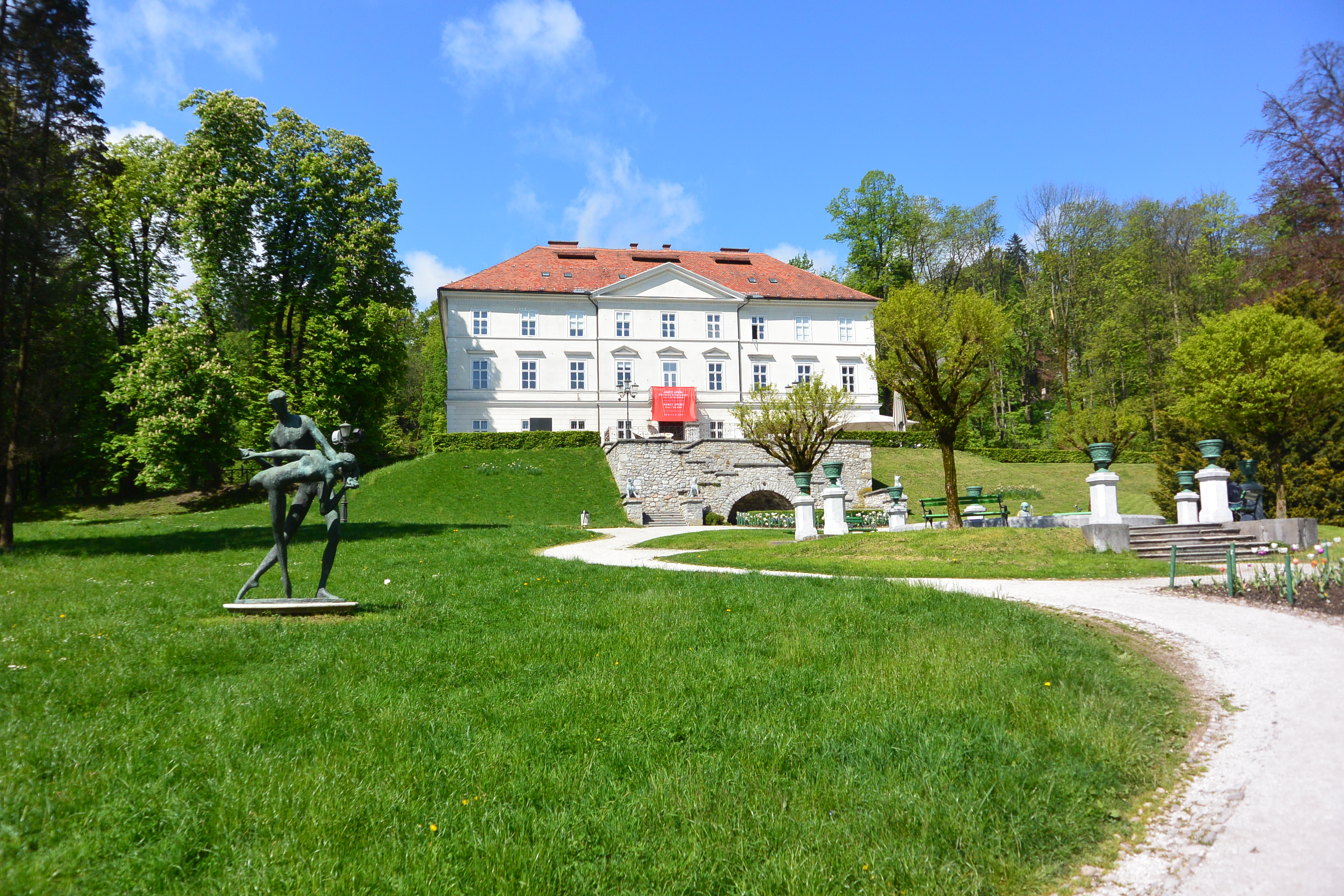
Tivoli Castle with its park

Tivoli Castle (Slovene: Grad Tivoli), originally called Podturn Manor (German: Schloss Unterthurn, Slovene: Grad Pod turnom), is a mansion in Ljubljana, the capital of Slovenia.

== Location ==
The mansion is located in the city's Tivoli Park (the part in the Rožnik District), northwest of (and visible from) the city centre, at the foot of Rožnik Hill. It is the terminus of the Jakopič Promenade (formerly the Lantieri Promenade), itself the continuation of Cankar Street.

An alpine-style building called the Švicarija (German: Schweitzerhaus 'the Swiss House', formerly the Tivoli Hotel) stands behind the mansion. The Jesenko Nature Trail leads past it.

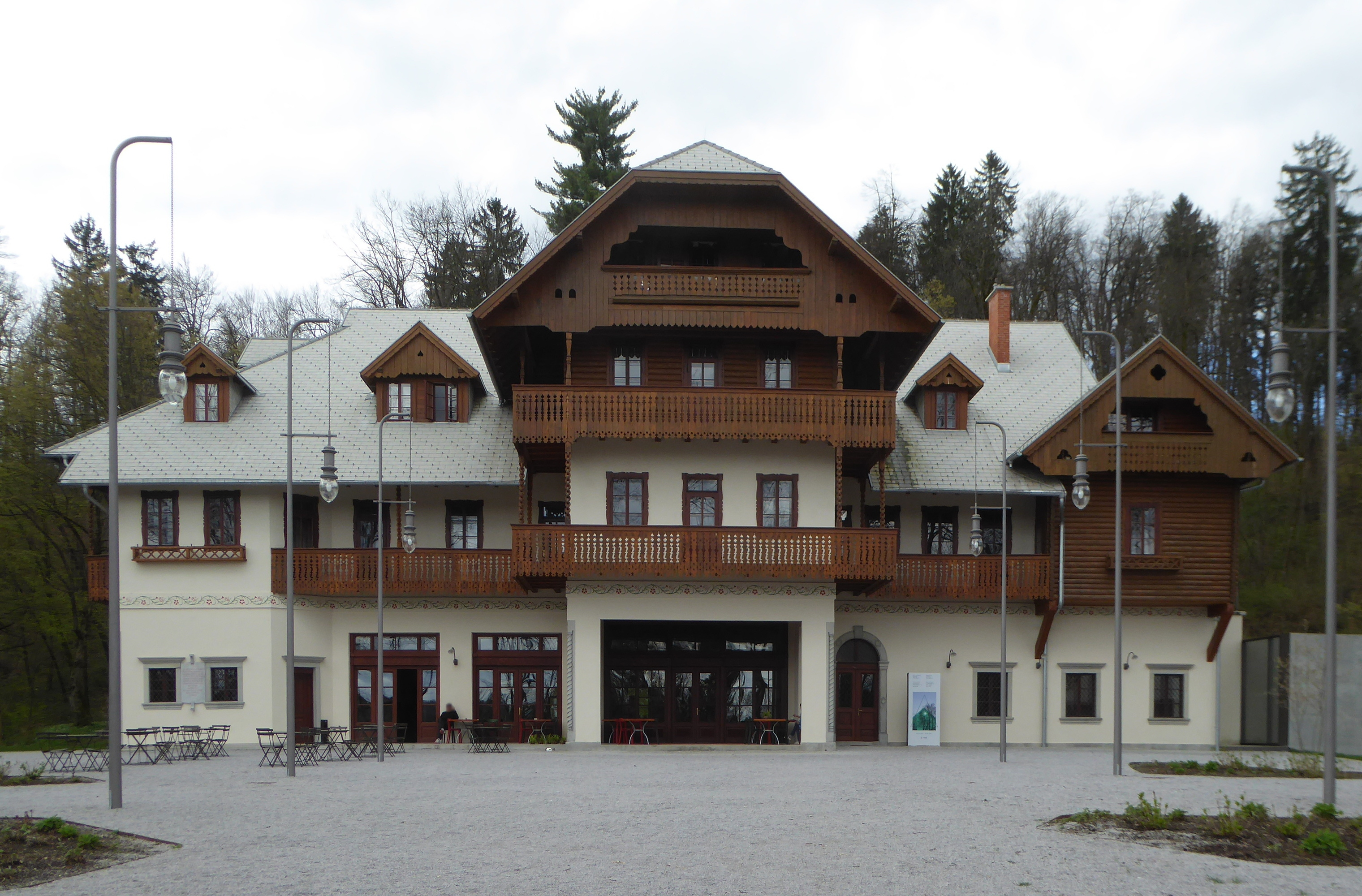
Švicarija Manor

== History ==
In the early 15th century, a tower stood in the woods above the site; it was owned by Georg Apfalterer, an ally of Duke Frederick (later Holy Roman Emperor Frederick III). The tower was destroyed by Frederick II, Count of Celje in 1440, but was the source of the original name of the castle: German Schloss Unterthurn and Slovene Grad Pod turnom, both literally 'castle below the tower'.

The current structure was built in the 17th century atop the ruins of a previous Renaissance-period castle. The mansion was initially owned by the Jesuits, but came into the possession of the Diocese of Ljubljana following the 1773 suppression of the Jesuit order. Used as the bishop's summer residence, it was surrounded with orchards.

In the mid-19th century, it was bought by the Austrian emperor Francis Joseph I, who in 1852 presented it as a gift to the veteran Habsburg marshal Joseph Radetzky. Radetzky renovated the mansion in the Neoclassical style, giving it its present appearance, and spent much of his retirement in it with his wife Francisca von Strassoldo Grafenberg, a local Carniolan noblewoman.

The field marshal Joseph Radetzky von Radetz (1766–1858) contributed a lot to the arrangement of Tivoli Park. There was a full-size cast iron statue of Radetzky on display in Ljubljana on the steps in front of Tivoli Castle from 1882 till 1918. In 1851, it won a prize at the Great Exhibition in London. Today, it is preserved by the City Museum of Ljubljana. The statue's pedestal, however, remains at its original place.

In 1863, the mansion was bought by the Municipality of Ljubljana, who used it as (among other things) a poorhouse, later subdividing it into condominiums. In 1967, it was again renovated and became the venue for the International Centre of Graphic Arts.

== Cast iron dogs ==
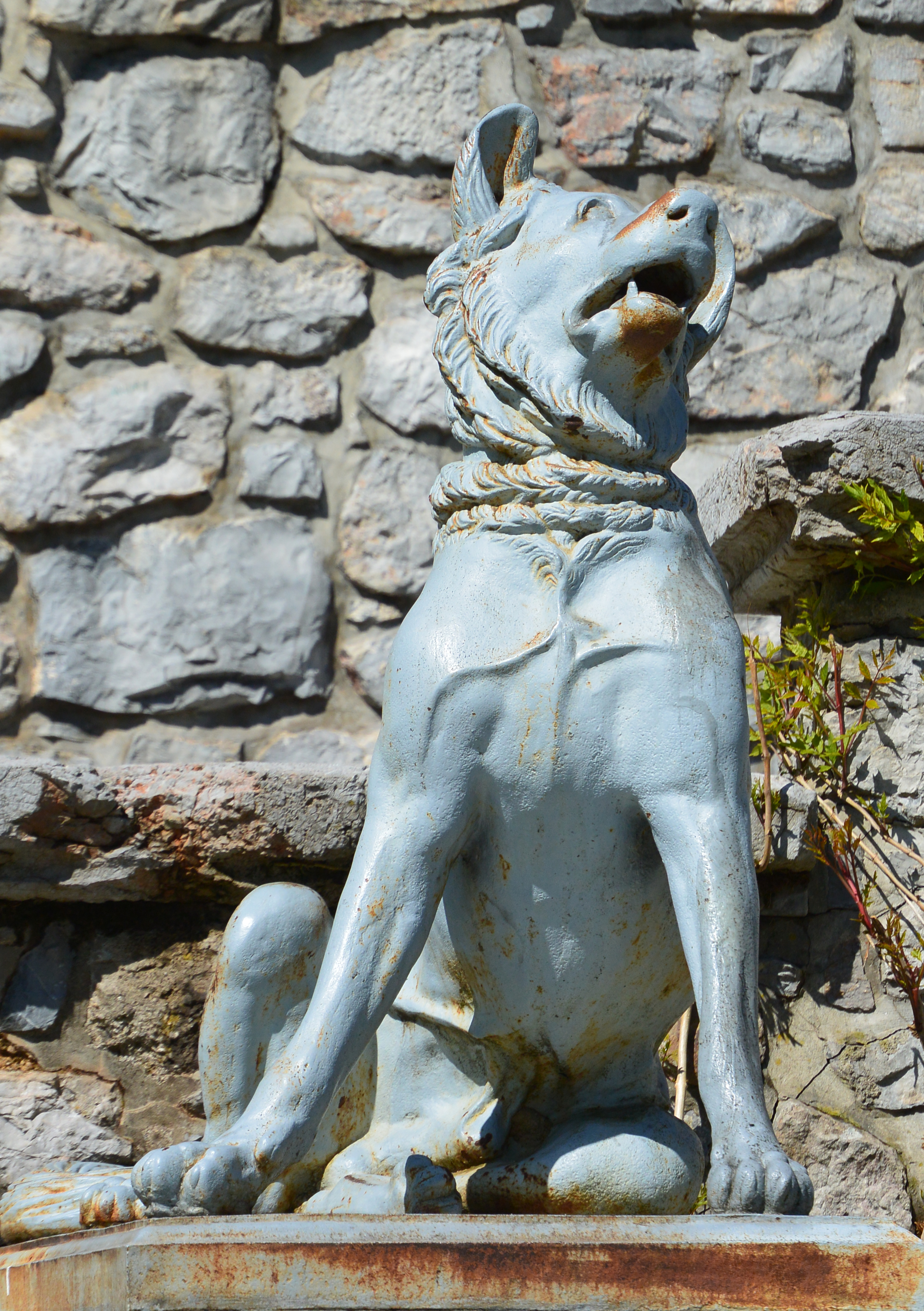
Cast iron dog by Fernkorn

In 1864, the Austrian sculptor Anton Dominik Fernkorn created four cast iron dogs, still on display in Tivoli Park in front of Tivoli Castle. The dogs do not have tongues, and it has been falsely rumoured that Fernkorn committed suicide by shooting himself due to this mistake.
