= Kočevska Reka =

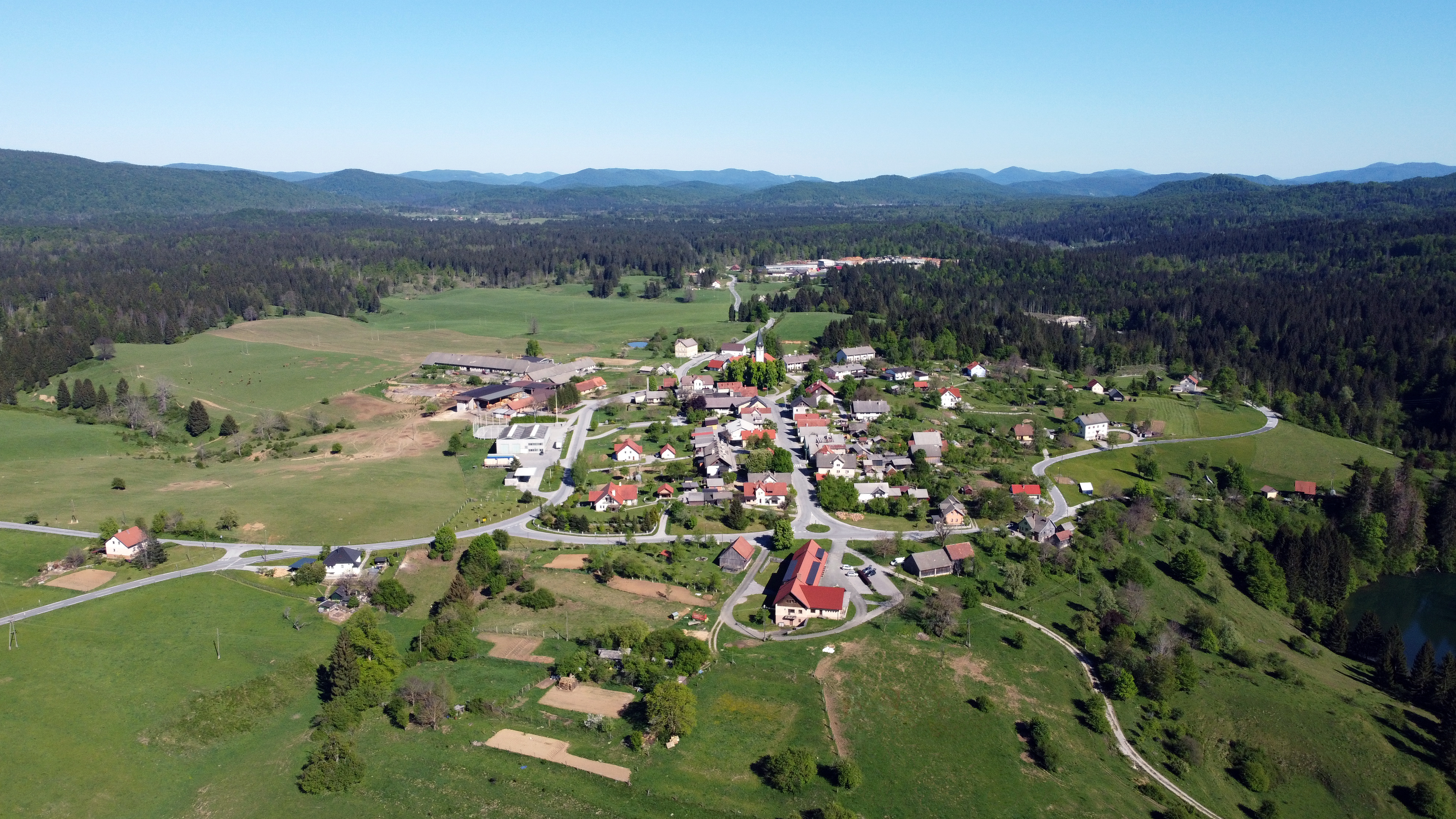

- Location in Slovenia
- Coordinates: 45°34′29.76″N 14°47′57.12″E
- Country: Slovenia
- Traditional region: Lower Carniola
- Statistical region: Southeast Slovenia
- Municipality: Kočevje

Area
  - Total: 17.5 km^{2} (6.8 sq mi)
- Elevation: 567 m (1,860 ft)

Population (2002)
  - Total: 277
- Postal code: 1338

Kočevska Reka (pronounced [kɔˈtʃeːu̯ska ˈɾeːka]; German: Rieg) is a settlement in the Municipality of Kočevje in southern Slovenia. It was a village settled by Gottschee Germans. A major fire destroyed most of the village in 1929, but it was restored. During the Second World War its original population was expelled. The area is part of the traditional region of Lower Carniola and is now included in the Southeast Slovenia Statistical Region.

== Name ==
The settlement was originally called Reka (literally, 'river'), after the Reka River south of the settlement. The specifier Kočevska 'Kočevje' was added later in order to distinguish the settlement from the town of Rijeka (Slovene: Reka) on the Kvarner Gulf, with which the population had trade connections.

== History ==
The Kočevska Reka volunteer fire department became a founding unit of the Kočevje municipal fire department on 28 August 1955.

== Church ==
The local parish church, dedicated to John the Baptist, was a 16th-century building that survived the Second World War, but it was demolished in 1954. The current church was built between 1994 and 1999.

== Notable people ==
Notable people that were born or lived in Kočevska Reka include:

- Johann Kosler (1819–1898), politician and agriculture expert
- Josef Kosler (1822–1917), lawyer and head of efforts to drain the Ljubljana Marsh

== Gallery ==
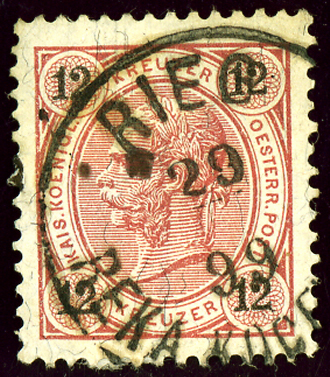
12 kr Austrian stamp in 1899 with German and Slovenian names

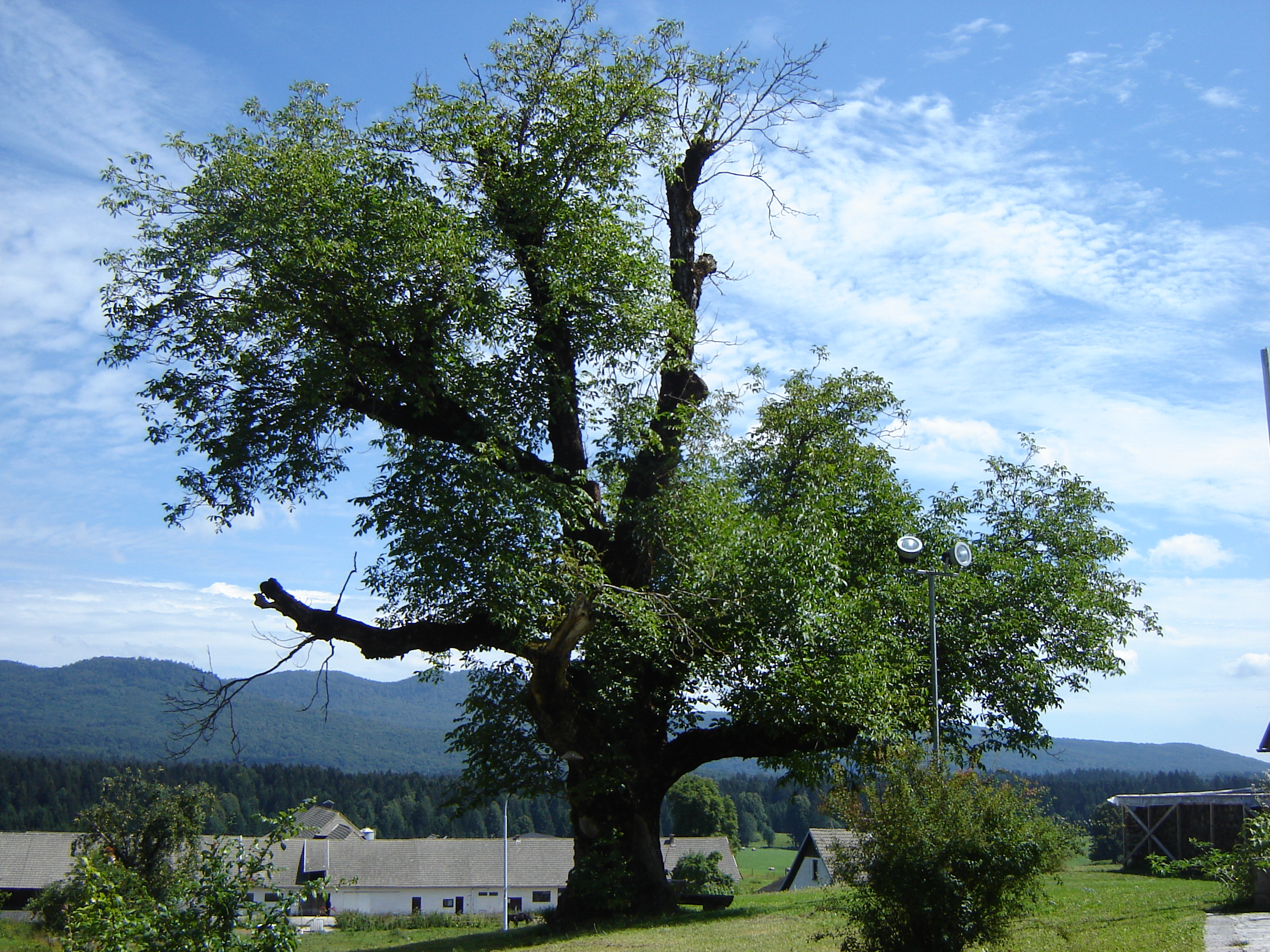
The largest walnut tree in Slovenia (in Kočevska Reka).
