= Slovenia floods =

Slovenia floods may refer to:

- 2010 Slovenia floods
- 2023 Slovenia floods
