= Rožna Dolina (Ljubljana) =

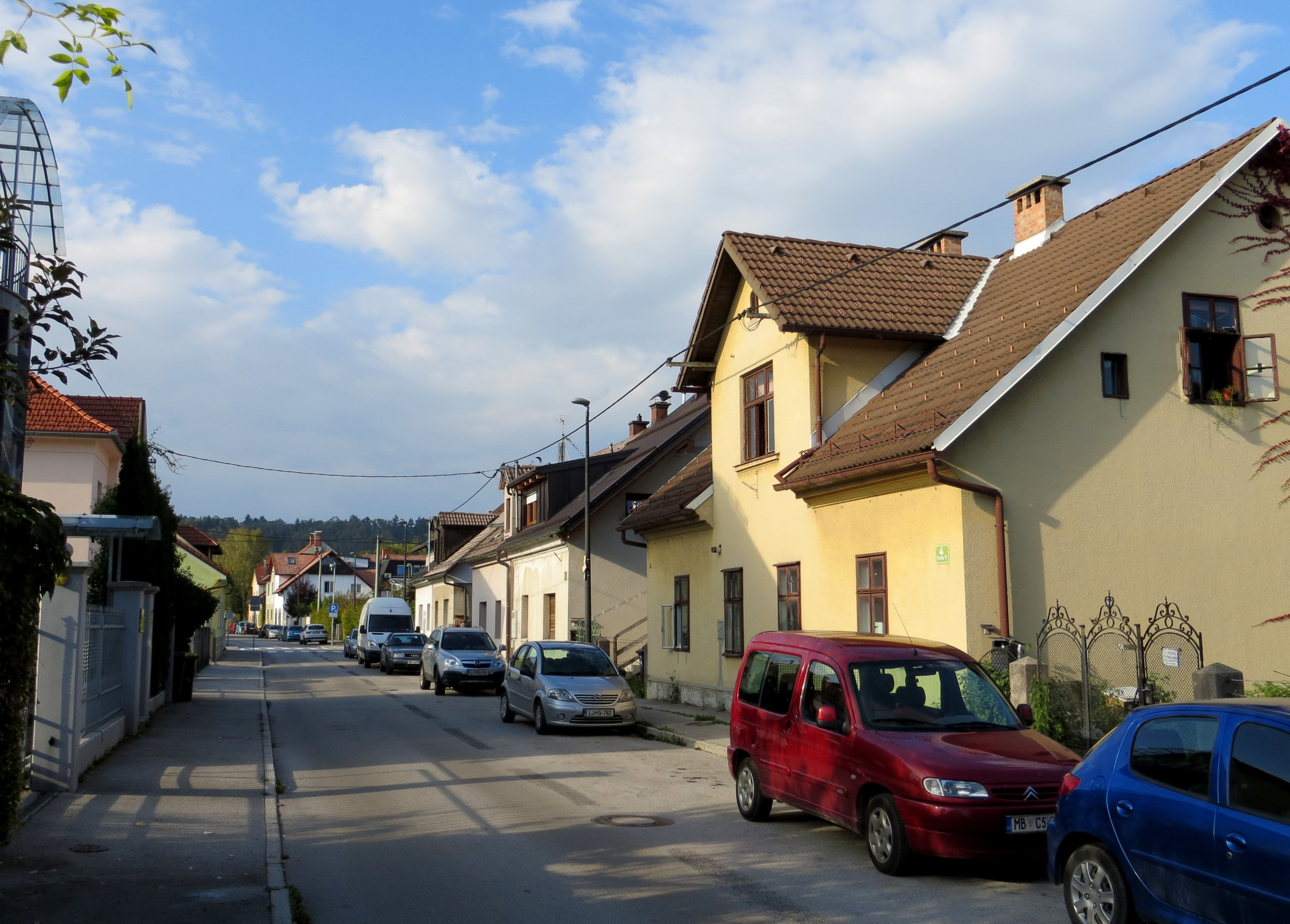

- Location in Slovenia
- Coordinates: 46°2′51.24″N 14°29′5.73″E
- Country: Slovenia
- Traditional region: Upper Carniola
- Statistical region: Central Slovenia
- Municipality: Ljubljana
- Elevation: 295 m (968 ft)

Rožna Dolina (pronounced [ˈɾoːʒna dɔˈliːna]; Slovene: Rožna dolina) is a formerly independent settlement in the southwest part of the capital Ljubljana in central Slovenia. It is part of the traditional region of Upper Carniola and is now included with the rest of the municipality in the Central Slovenia Statistical Region.

== Geography ==
Rožna Dolina lies west of downtown Ljubljana, between Rožnik Hill to the north, and the railroad from Ljubljana to Sežana to the south. The land is low and swampy. Glinščica Creek flows through the western part of the Rožna Dolina. Habjan Pond (Slovene: Habjanov bajer) was an overgrown area on the northern edge of the settlement at the foot of Rožnik Hill, east of 15th Street (Rožna dolina, cesta XV). Proposals to clean the area up and turn it into a park were carried out in 2014, and the area was a small park for a short period of time. Building work for a new residential development was being carried out as of 2020.

== Name ==
The name Rožna Dolina (literally, 'flower valley') did not come into use until about 1904 and was coined by Janez Evangelist Krek. It is ultimately derived from Rožnik Hill, the Slovene name of which is a translation from the German name Rosenberg, originally a compound of Middle High German rôse 'rose' and berc 'mountain, hill'. The hill is also the source of the name Rosenbüchel (or Rosenbichl, literally 'rose hill'), a manor built at the foot of Rožnik Hill in the 18th century and also known in Slovene as Idrijčanov grad (a.k.a. Viderčanov grad; literally, 'the man from Idrija's manor').

== History ==
Rožna Dolina was originally part of the village of Glince in the former Municipality of Vič. The area was largely undeveloped until after the 1895 Ljubljana earthquake, when developers started looking for cheap land near industry to build housing for workers. The low-lying meadows in what is now Rožna Dolina were purchased in the 1890s by the Slovene Workers Building Association (Slovensko delavsko stavbno društvo), founded by Janez Evangelist Krek, and the first house was built in 1898 below the railroad line, where the ground was somewhat higher. Its owner, Matevž Perne, became the first head of the Rožna Dolina Beautification Society (Slovene: Olepševalno društvo Rožna dolina), founded in 1905. The society members largely developed Rožna Dolina at their own initiative, building drainage canals, streets, and roads, because the new settlement and its residents were viewed with some distrust by the original farming population of Vič. The village developed as a suburb of Ljubljana and never had a farming population. Rožna Dolina was separated from Glince and made an independent village in 1924. In the 1931 census, Rožna Dolina had a population of 3,431 living in 352 houses. Along with the entire former Municipality of Vič, Rožna Dolina was annexed by the City of Ljubljana in 1935, ending its existence as an independent settlement.

== Cultural heritage ==
- In the southwest part of Rožna Dolina there is a railroad bridge across Glinščica Creek. It is a single-arch stone structure built in 1857 and is part of the original infrastructure of the Austrian Southern Railway.
- The Podrožnik Manor (Vila Podrožnik), now a state-owned protocol estate, stands below Rožnik Hill on the northern edge of the neighborhood.
- The Vidmar house (Vidmarjeva vila) stands on April 27 Street (Cesta 27. aprila). It is where the Anti-Imperialist Front (later renamed the Liberation Front of the Slovenian People) was established on 26 April 1941.
- A monument to Toni Mrlak, a Slovene pilot killed during the Ten-Day War, stands in the southeast part of the settlement, along Rožna Dolina Street (Cesta v Rožno dolino).
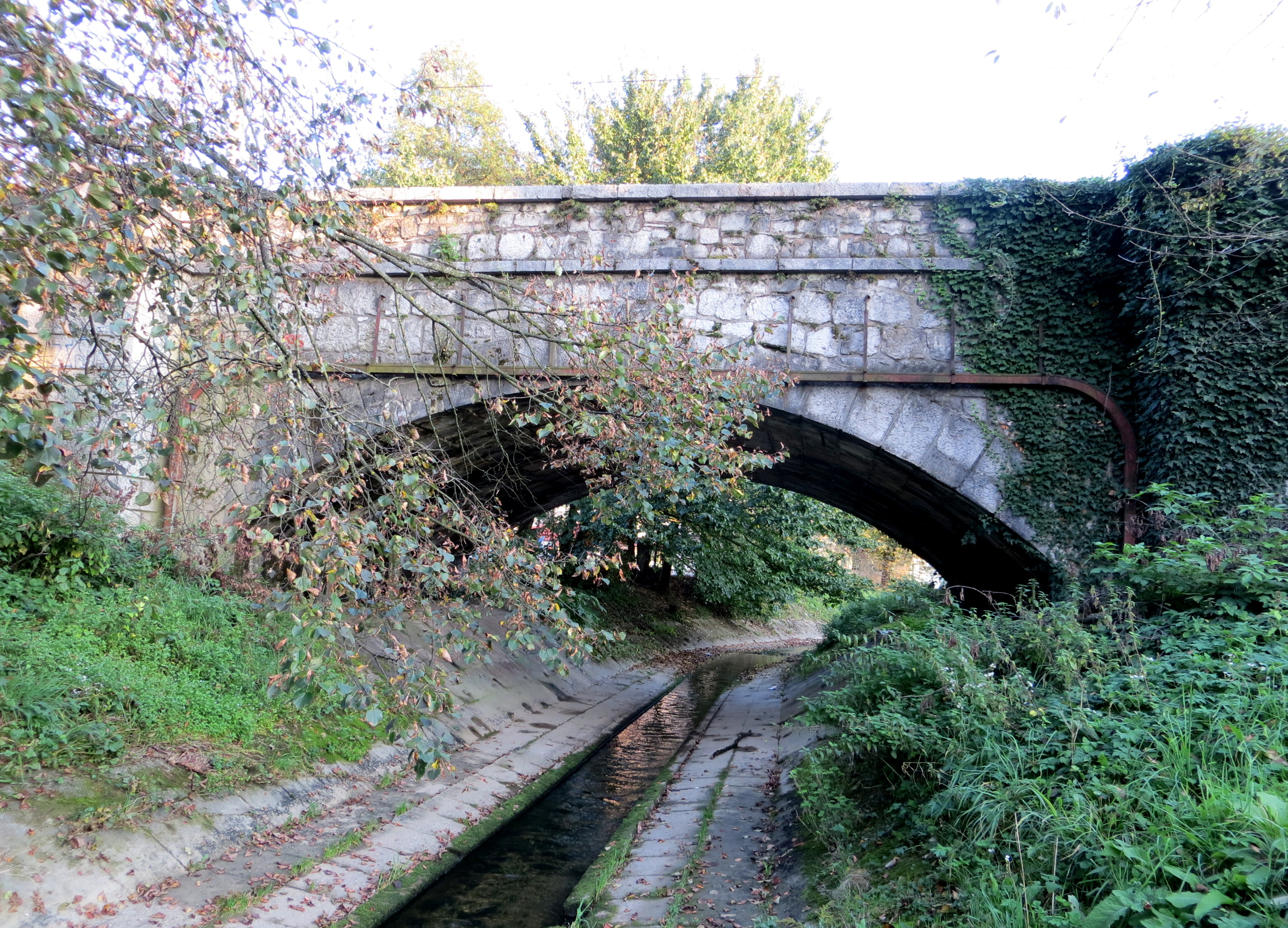
1857 railroad bridge

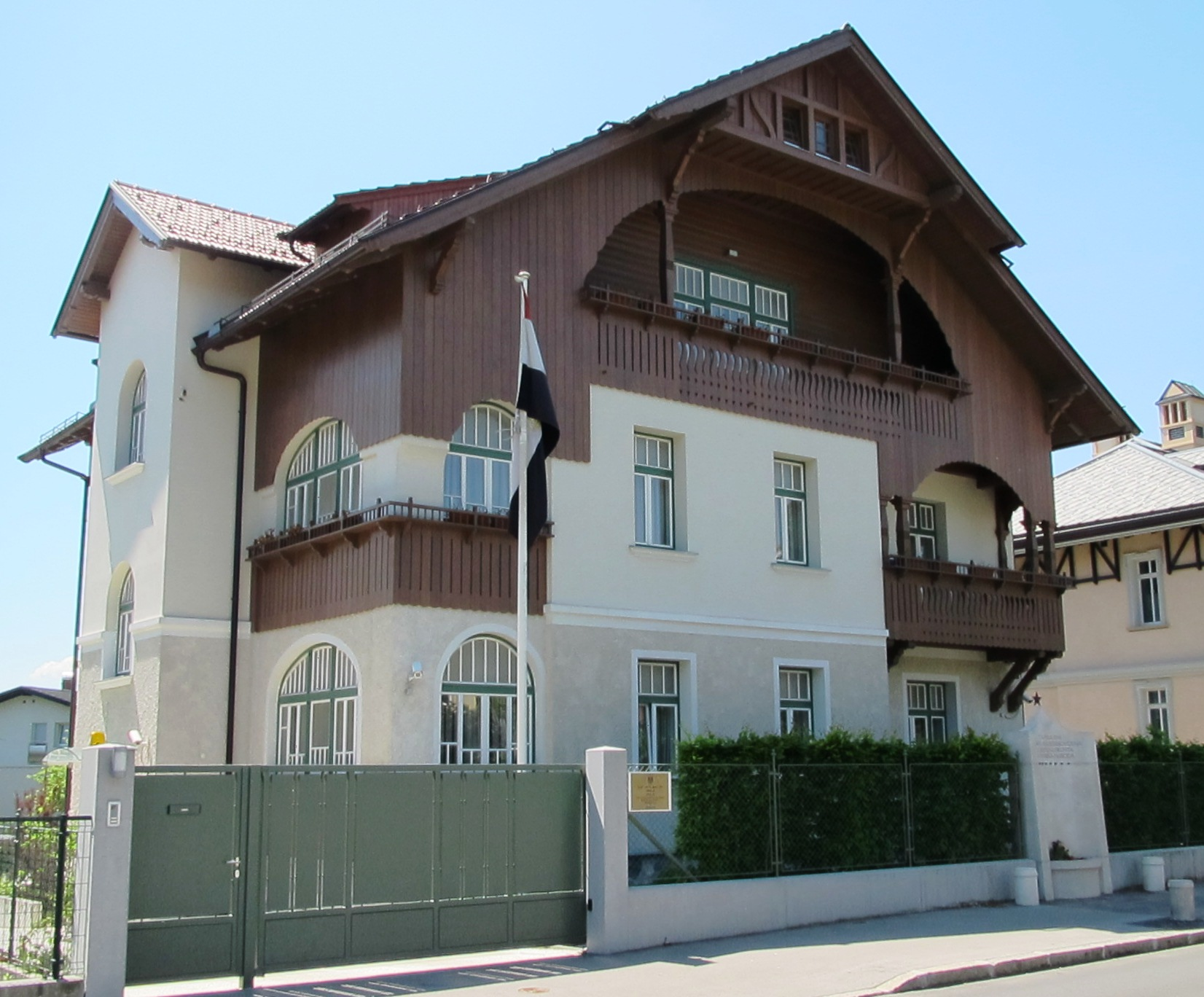
Vidmar house

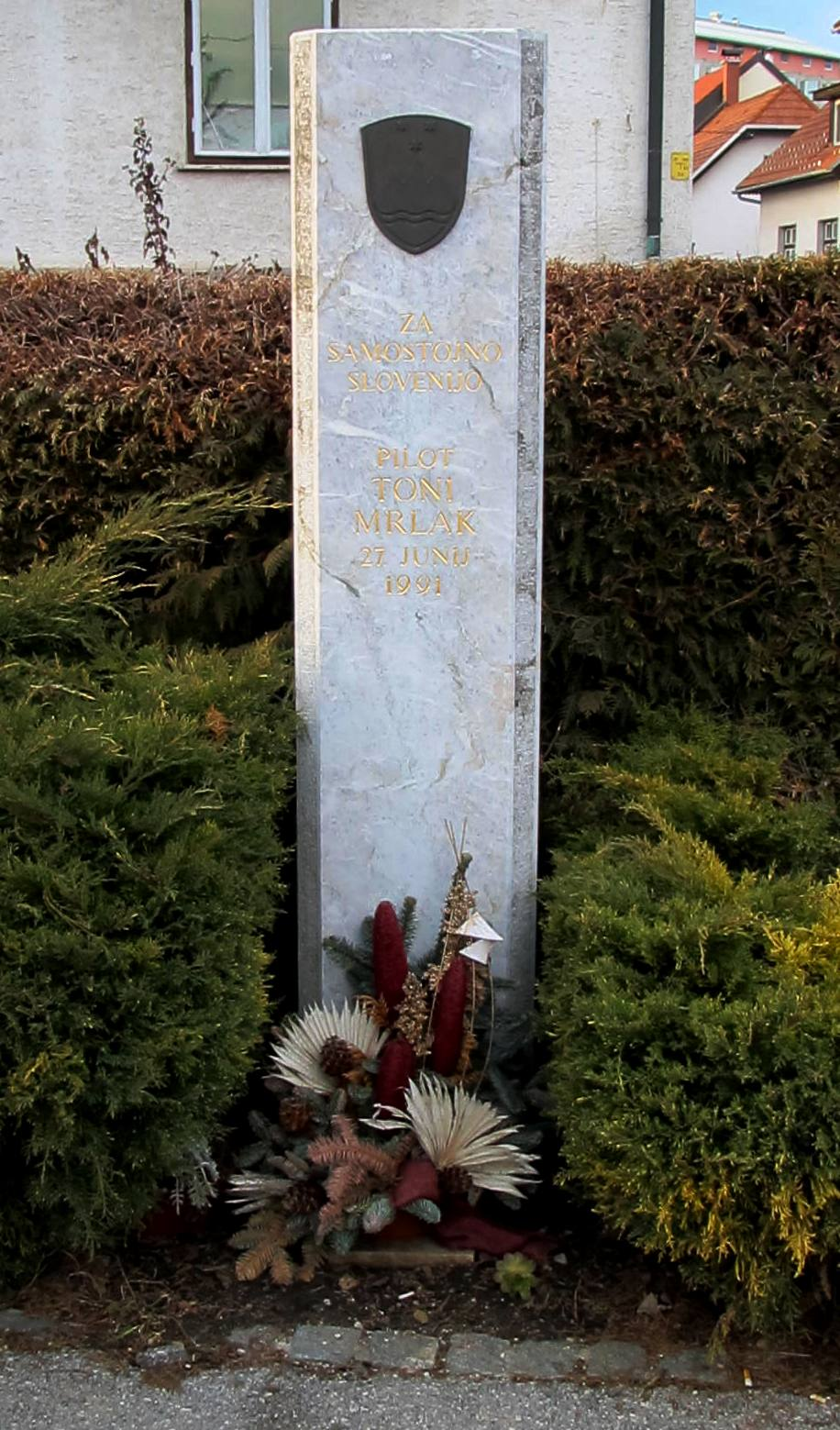
Toni Mrlak memorial

== Notable people ==
Notable people that were born or lived in Rožna Dolina include:

- Vitan Mal (born 1946), writer
- Rudi Simčič (1920–2006), painter
