= Vič =

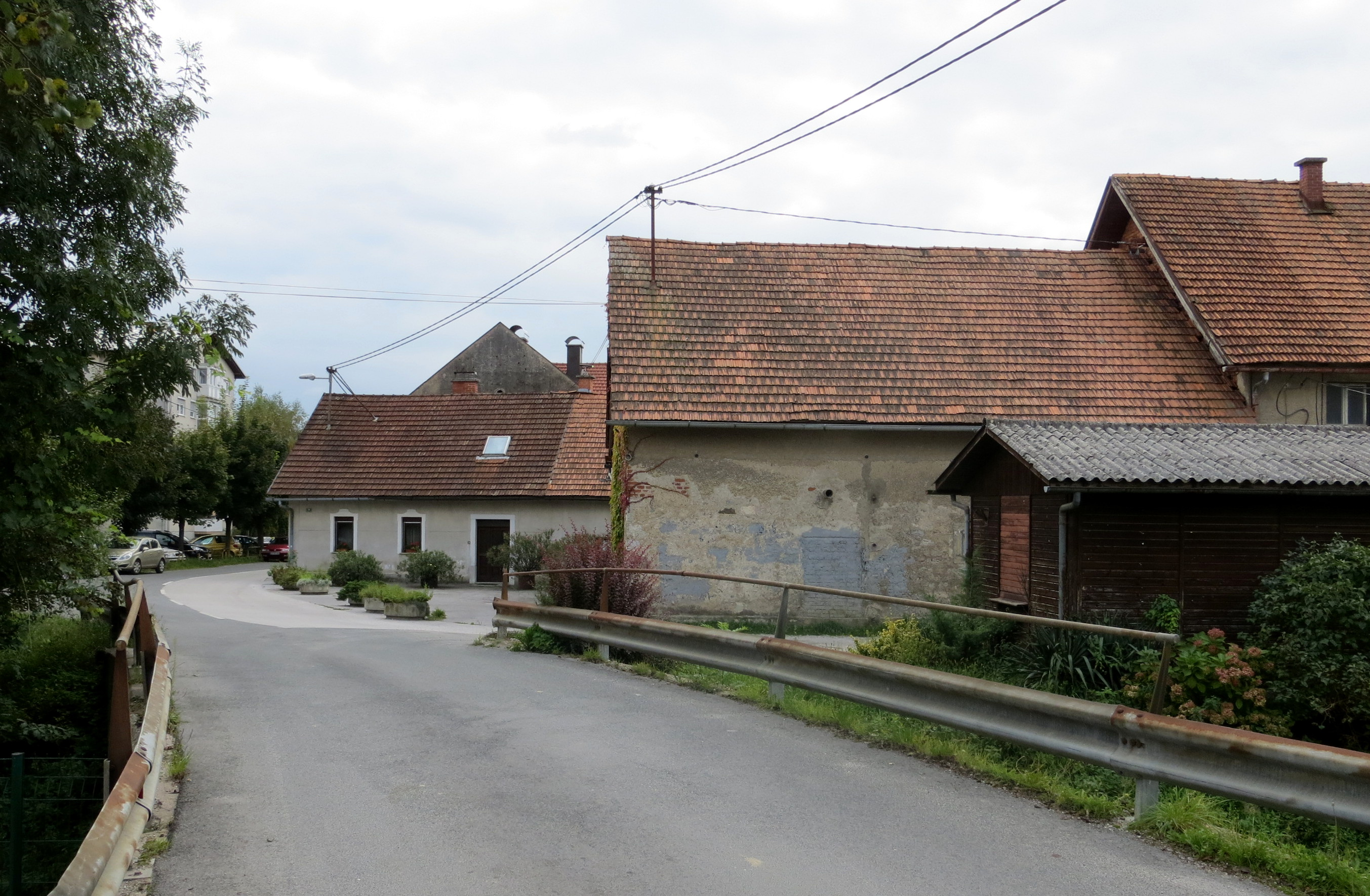

- Location in Slovenia
- Coordinates: 46°2′11″N 14°29′06″E
- Country: Slovenia
- Traditional region: Upper Carniola
- Statistical region: Central Slovenia
- Municipality: Ljubljana
- Elevation: 296 m (971 ft)

Vič (pronounced [ˈʋiːtʃ]; German: Waitsch) is a former village in the western part of Ljubljana, the capital of Slovenia. It is part of the traditional region of Upper Carniola and is now included with the rest of the municipality in the Central Slovenia Statistical Region.

== Name ==
Vič was attested in written sources as Weyze in 1339, Weycz in 1414, and Weitsch in 1406, among other spellings. The origin of the name is uncertain. Possibilities include derivation from the noun *vič 'willow switches' or 'young woods', or from the personal name *Vitъ, referring to an early inhabitant. Less likely possibilities include derivation from bič 'rushes' and Latin vicus 'village'. In the past the German name was Waitsch.

== History ==
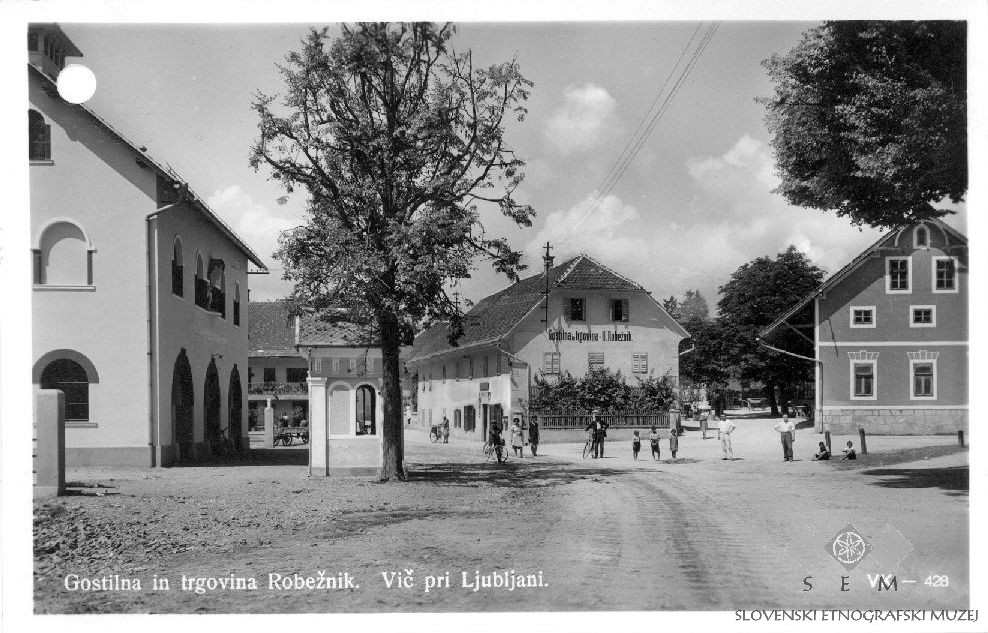
Historical postcard of Vič

Vič is the oldest settlement in the immediate area; Glince and Rožna Dolina were settled later. In 1783, Vič had a population of 297 living in 43 houses. By 1925 the population of Vič had increased to 966, and by 1931 there were 1,330 people in the village.

Vič was annexed by the City of Ljubljana in 1935, ending its existence as an independent settlement. In 2010, Vič was heavily affected by floods.

== Cultural heritage ==
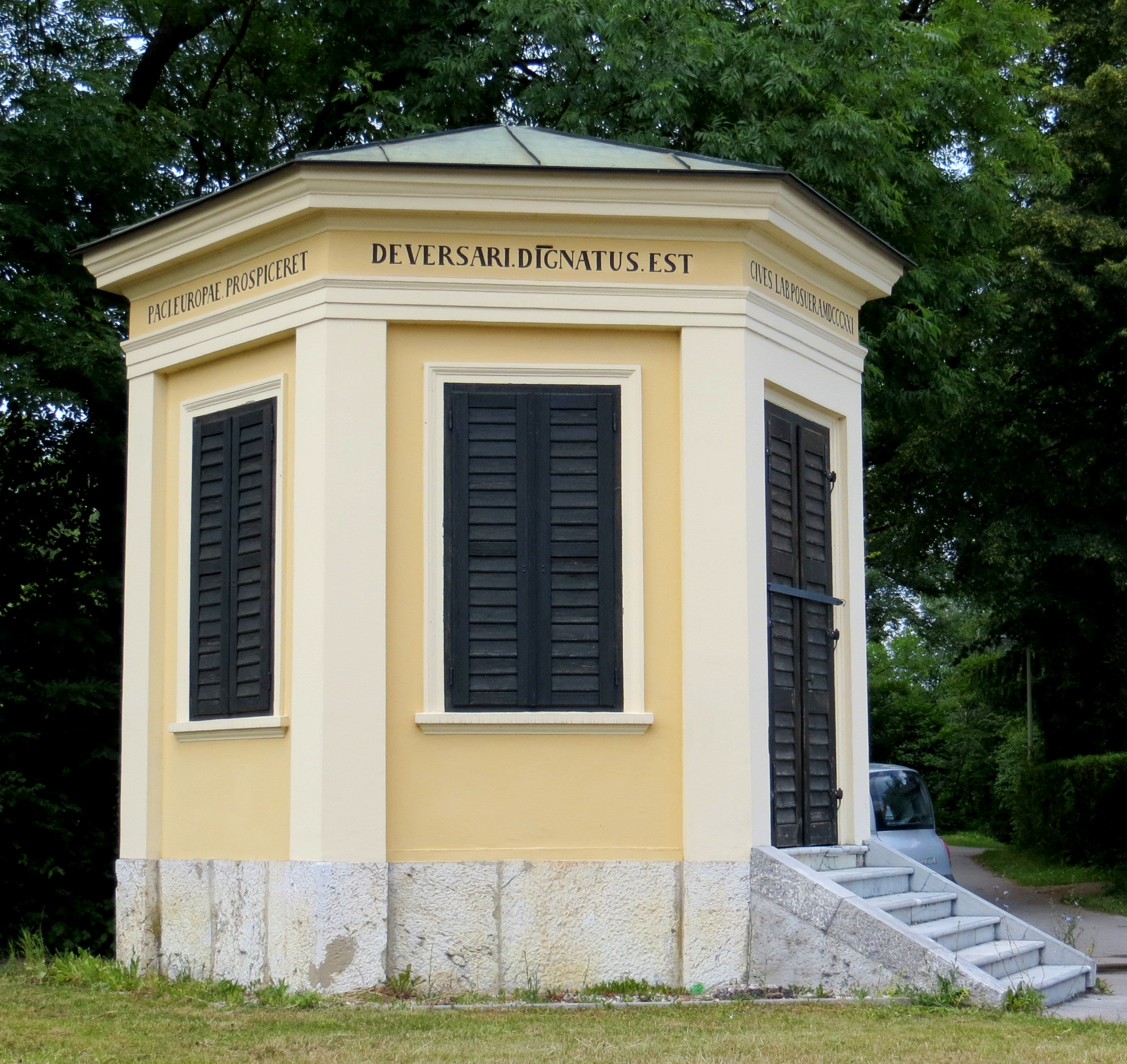
Two Emperors Street Pavilion

- The Two Emperors Street Pavilion (Slovene: Paviljon na Cesti dveh cesarjev) stands at the west end of Two Emperors Street (Cesta dveh cesarjev) in the southwest part of Vič. It was built at the initiative of the Ljubljana town hall as a gift by the town's residents to Emperor Francis I, who celebrated his birthday in Ljubljana in 1821 while attending the Congress of Laibach together with Alexander I of Russia. The pavilion is built in the Empire style and is one of the few surviving imperial structures in Ljubljana.
- The Robežnik Inn, also known as the Žabar Inn, is a U-shaped set of buildings at Vič Street (Viška cesta) nos. 48 and 50 in the historical village center. It consists of living quarters, an inn, and farm buildings. The structures have been adapted to modern use, but architectural elements from the 19th century are preserved.
