= Glinščica =

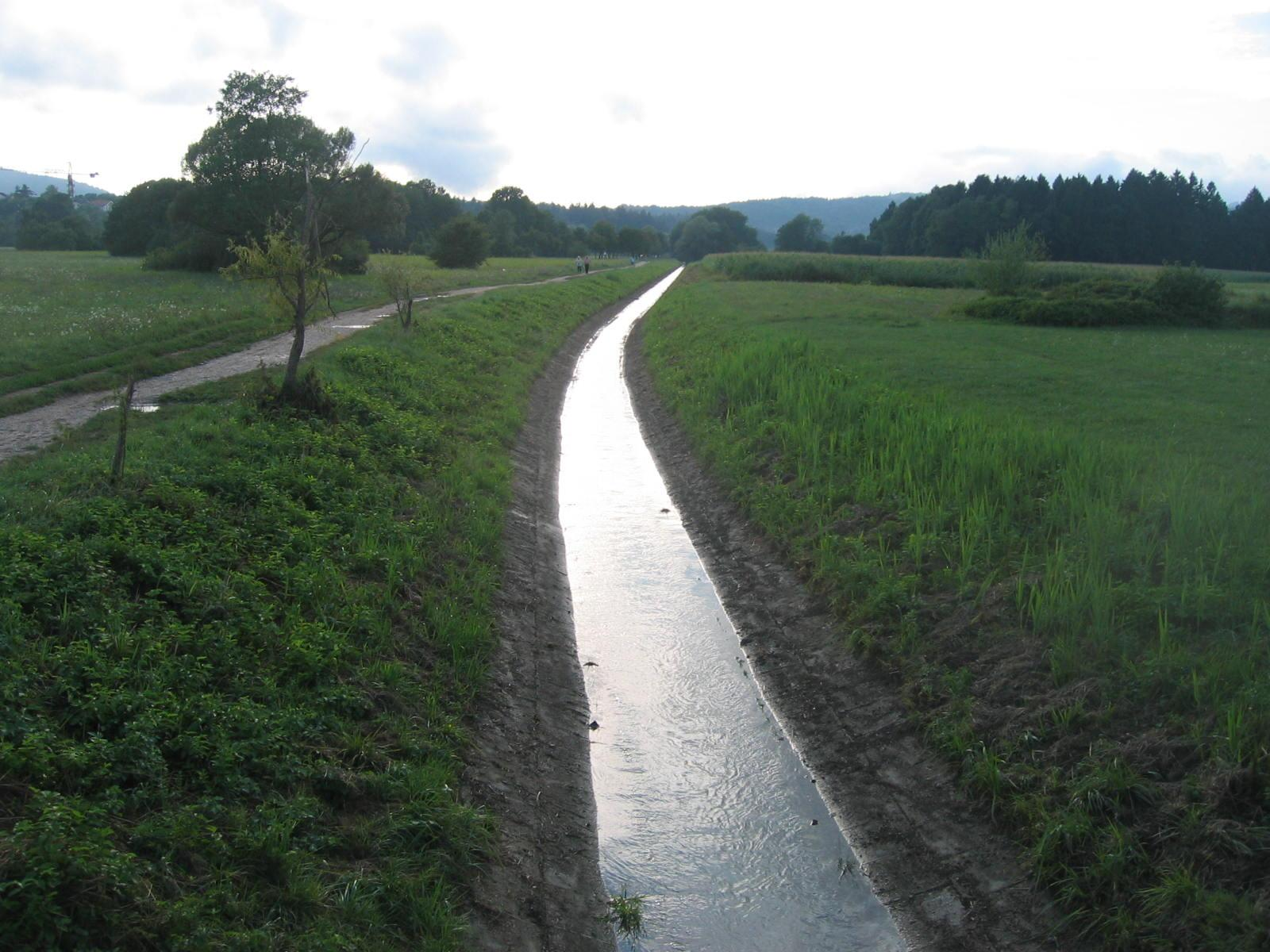
- Part of Glinščica Creek in Ljubljana, between the Path of Remembrance and Comradeship and the Biotechnical Faculty

Location
- Country: Slovenia

Physical characteristics
- Source
  - location: Toško Čelo
  - elevation: 400 m (1,300 ft)
- Mouth
  - location: Gradaščica River
  - coordinates: 46°2′29.37″N 14°28′50.56″E
- Length: 7.90 km (4.91 mi)

Basin features
- Progression: Gradaščica→ Ljubljanica→ Sava→ Danube→ Black Sea

The Glinščica (pronounced [ˈɡliːnʃtʃitsa]) is a stream in Slovenia.

== Geography ==
The source of Glinščica Creek is on the eastern slope of Peštota Hill (590 m) below the settlement of Toško Čelo and north of the Kucja Valley. It then flows through the Ljubljana neighborhood of Glinica (or Glince), between the neighborhoods of Kamna Gorica and Podutik (where it is crossed by the stone one-arch Kavšek Bridge and a new bridge for motorized traffic), briefly along the Path of Remembrance and Comradeship, and then southwest of Rožnik Hill and through the Rožna Dolina neighborhood before joining the Gradaščica River in the Vič District. Most of its lower course through Ljubljana is channelized.

== Name ==
Glinščica Creek was probably originally called the Glinica, from which the names of Ljubljana's Glinica and Glince neighborhoods were derived, after which the name Glinščica was re-derived from the settlement. In any case, both the name of the stream and the name of the settlement are derived from the common noun glina 'clay' via the derived noun *glinьnica 'clay pit'. The stream is also occasionally known as the Glanščica.

== History ==
Eyewitness reports state that Glinščica Creek was poisoned by seepage from the Big Brezar Shaft (Veliko Brezarjevo brezno) and ran red with blood after the post–Second World War massacre of POWs in the Kucja Valley.

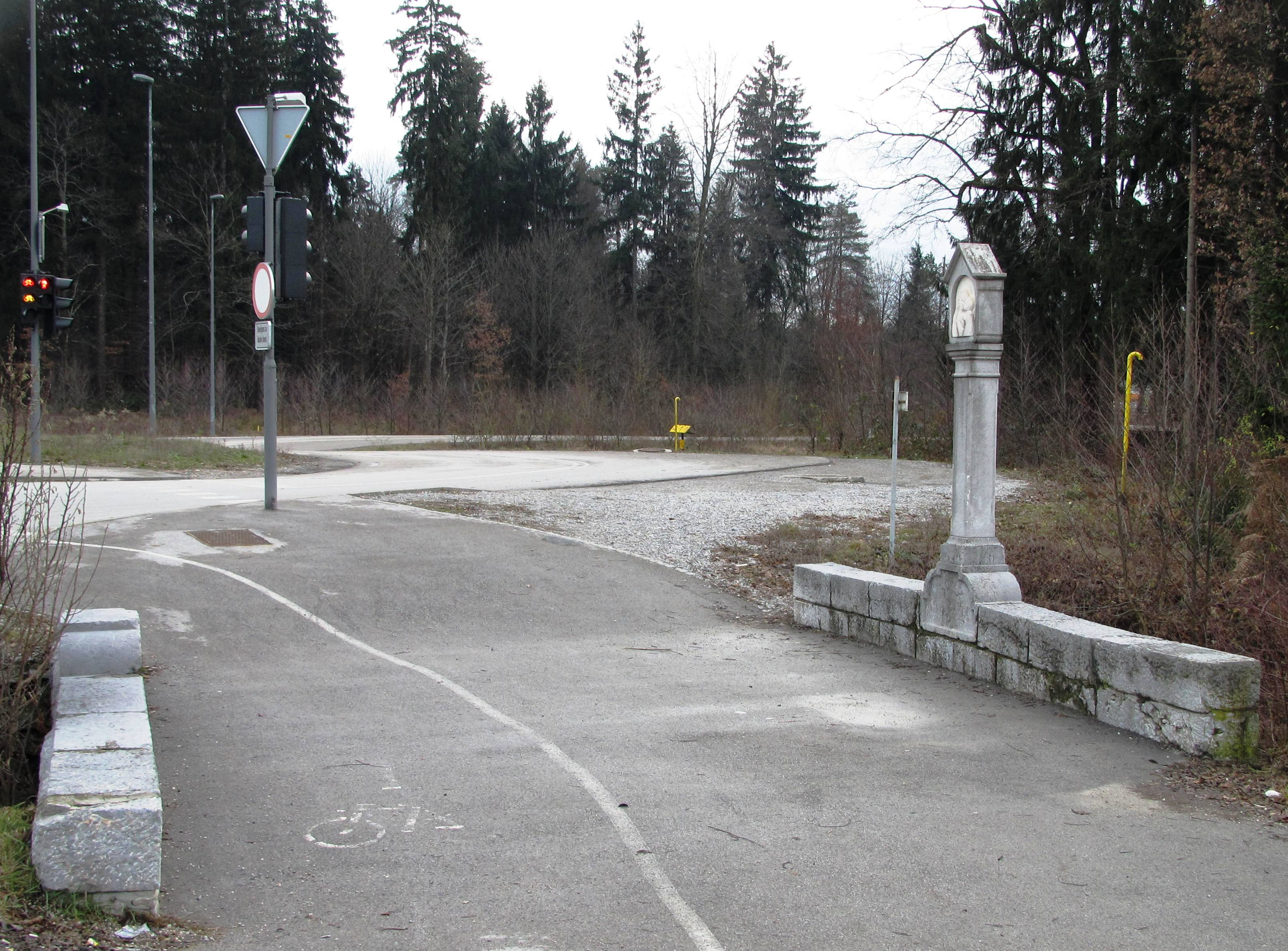
The Kavšek Bridge crossing the Glinščica in Podutik was built in 1901.

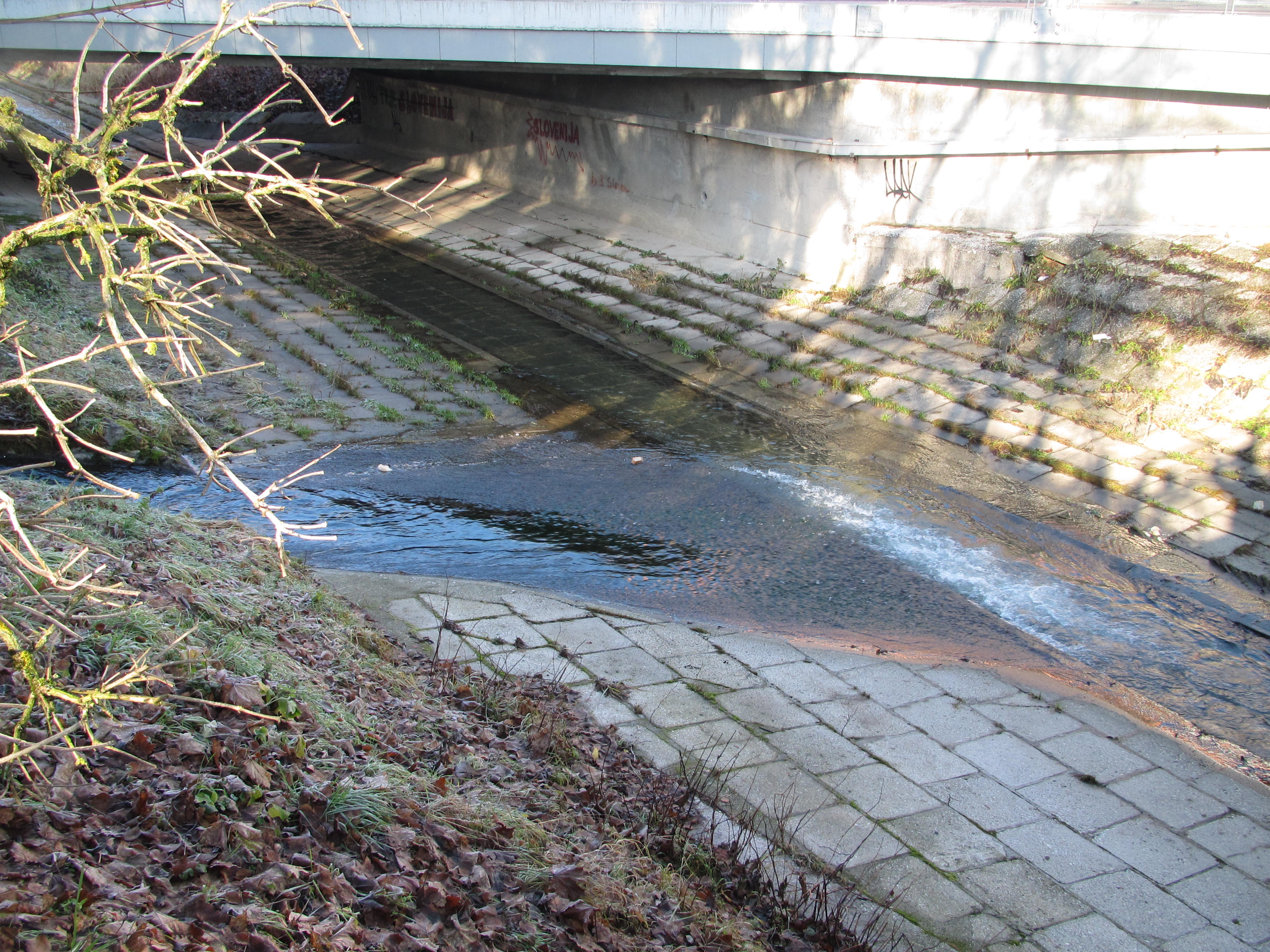
Confluence of the Gradaščica River (left) with Glinščica Creek (right) in Vič

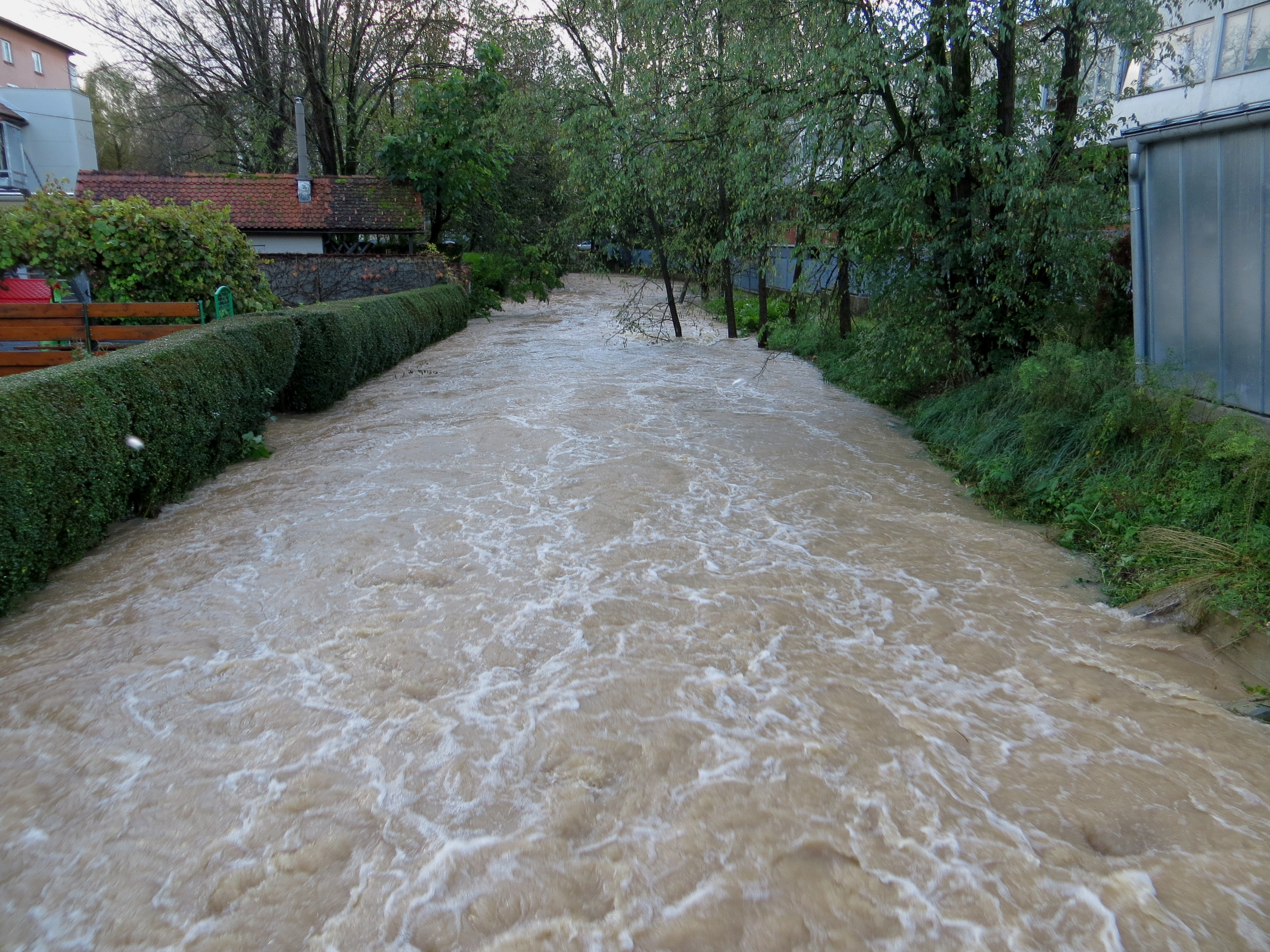
The Glinščica flooding in 2014
