= Kozarje =

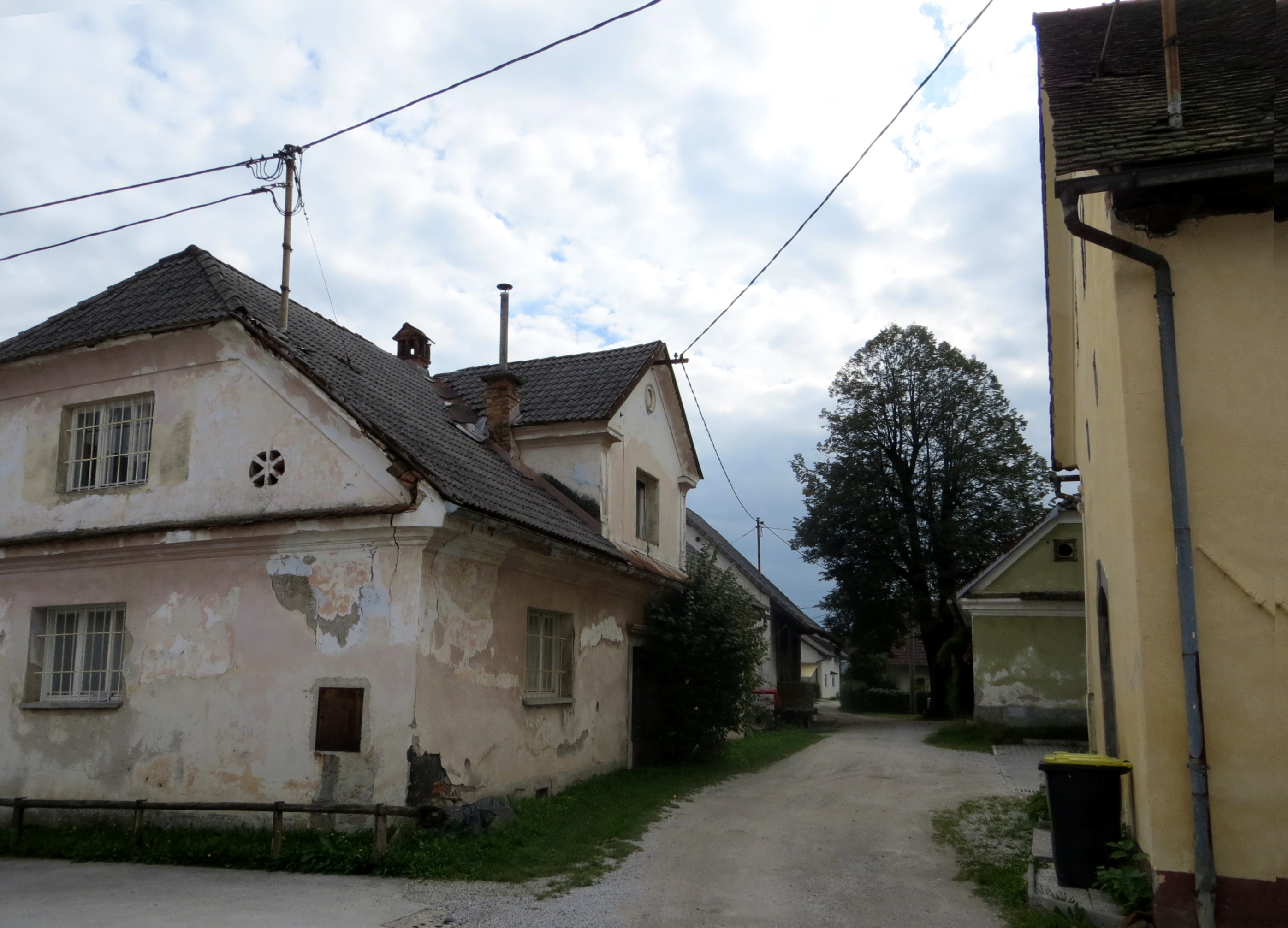

- Location in Slovenia
- Coordinates: 46°2′30.69″N 14°26′34.03″E
- Country: Slovenia
- Traditional region: Upper Carniola
- Statistical region: Central Slovenia
- Municipality: Ljubljana
- Elevation: 295 m (968 ft)

Kozarje (pronounced [kɔˈzaːɾjɛ]; in older sources also Kozarji) is a formerly independent settlement in the western part of the capital Ljubljana in central Slovenia. It is part of the traditional region of Upper Carniola and is now included with the rest of the municipality in the Central Slovenia Statistical Region. It includes the hamlet of Žeje.

== Geography ==
Kozarje is a clustered settlement west of Vič along the road from Ljubljana to Polhov Gradec. Most of the houses are on the south side of the Mali Graben. The Gradaščica River flows north of the settlement, where it is joined by Horjulščica Creek (a.k.a. Horjulka Creek). At Kozarje most of the stream of the Gradaščica is split off into the Mali Graben and the rest continues as the Gradaščica (also known as the Mestna Gradaščica 'Town Gradaščica'). South of the settlement is Kozarje Field (Slovene: Kozarško polje). The old village core is now bounded on the south by the freeway from Ljubljana to Vrhnika.

== Name ==
Kozarje was attested in written sources in 1322 as Coͤser (and as Kosar in 1414, Gosar, Gasyer, and Gasier in 1421, Kassar in 1431, and Goser in 1496), among other spellings. The name is derived from the Slovene common noun kozar 'goatherd', originally the masculine plural *Kozarji, the accusative of which, Kozarje, was later reanalyzed as a feminine nominative plural.

== History ==
The Kanc brick works (Slovene: Kančeva opekarna) stood in Kozarje Field south of Kozarje before the First World War. Kozarje was annexed by the City of Ljubljana in 1982, ending its existence as an independent settlement.

== Cultural heritage ==
Two cultural heritage units are registered in Kozarje:

- The old village center consists of single-story houses and large outbuildings, mostly set up with courtyards. The layout of the structures and the older buildings date from the end of the 19th century.
- The farm at Špan Lane (Slovene: Španova pot) no. 8. has a single-story house with a partial cellar and a half-hip roof. The door casing is engraved with the year 1860 and the initials IK. A barn with two doors and a linden tree stand next to the house. The layout of the structures, vaulting, and many architectural elements are preserved. The farm stands in the middle of the former village.
- A monument dedicated to the 700th anniversary of Kozarje (1322–2022) stands in the northern part of the village
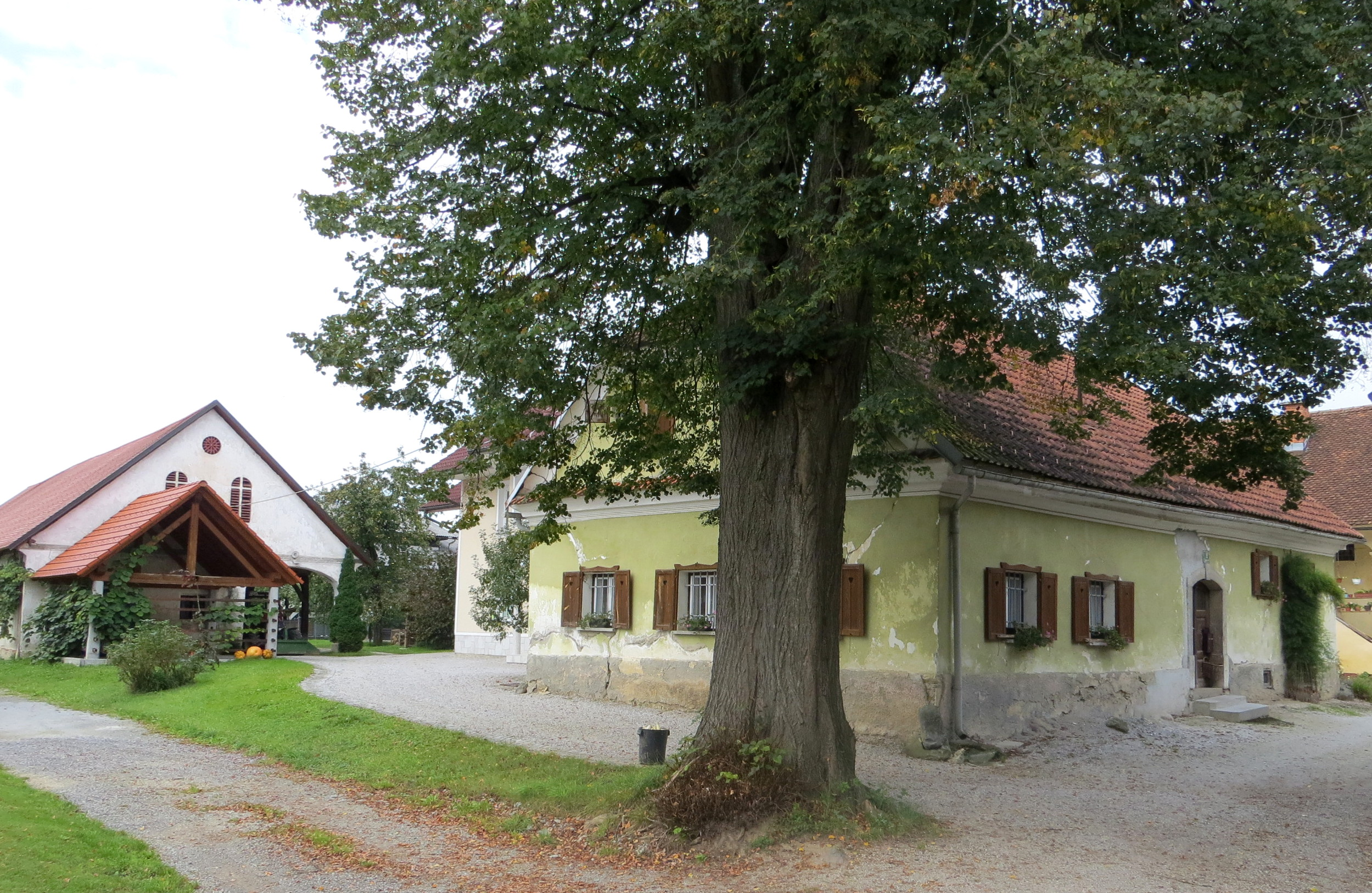
Farm at Špan Lane no. 8

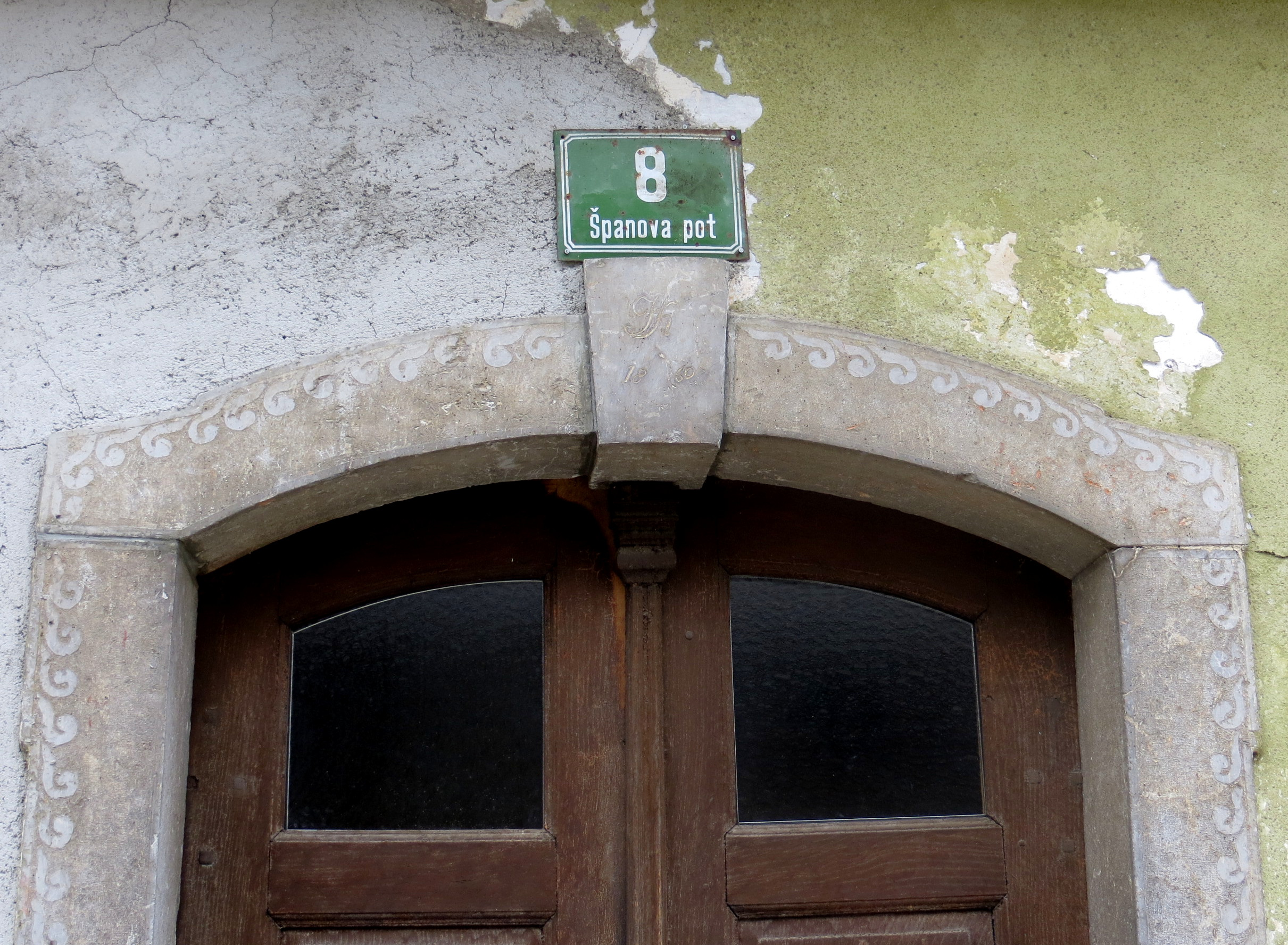
Door casing, detail

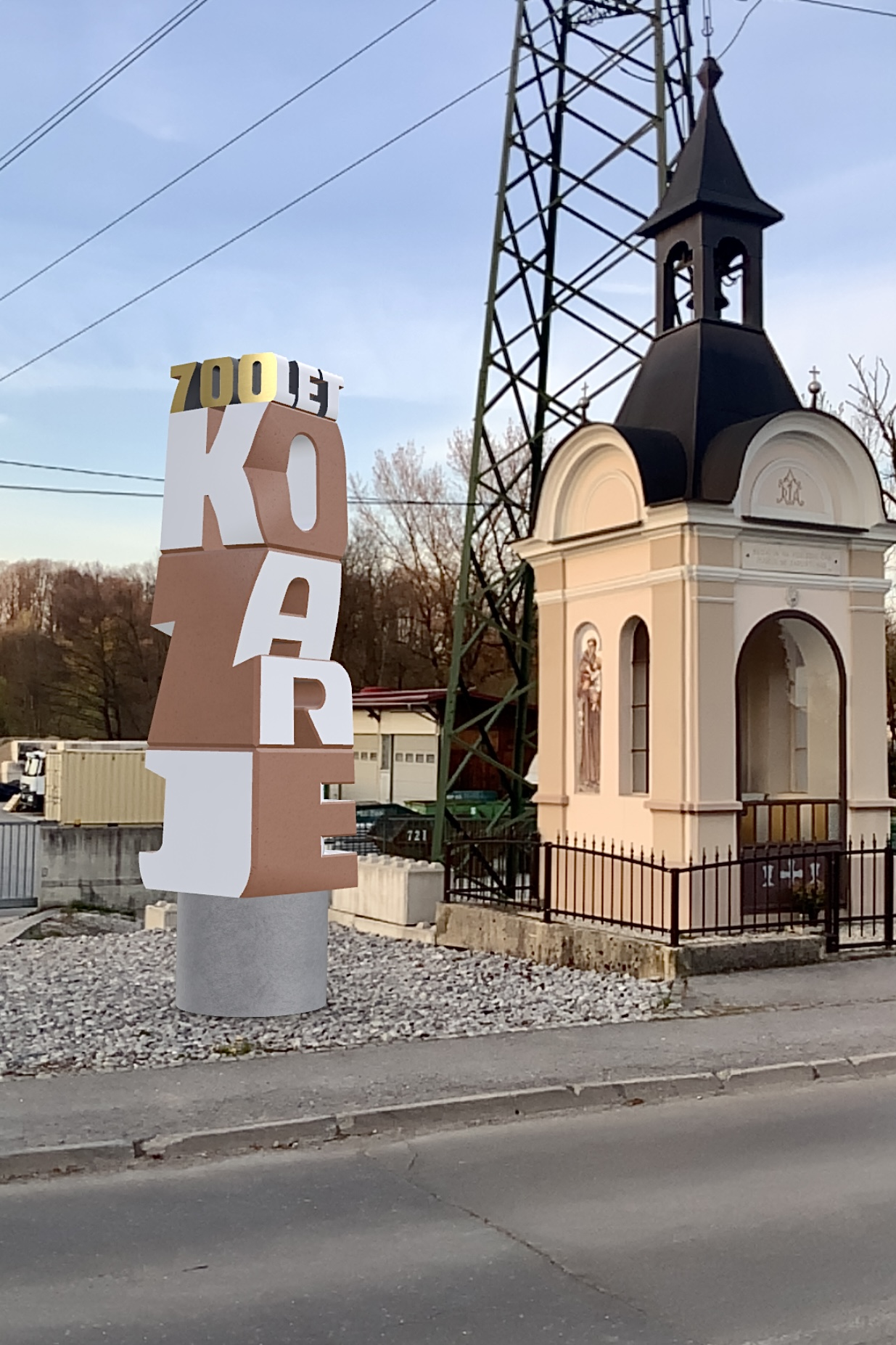
Kozarje monument

== Notable people ==
Notable people from Kozarje include:

- Marjan Dovjak (1928–1971), painter and art teacher at Hinko Smrekar Primary School
