= Kavšek Bridge =

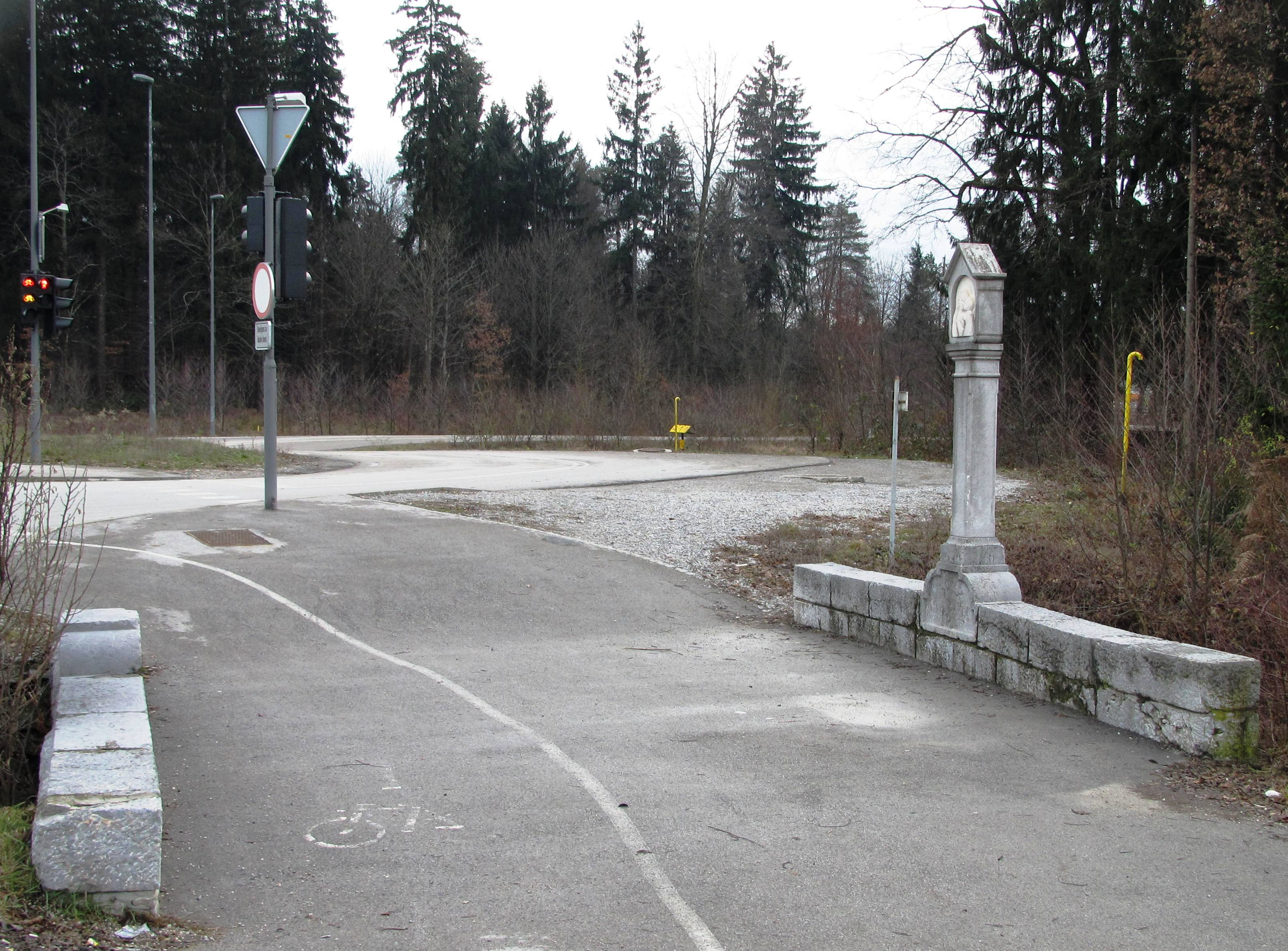
- The Kavšek Bridge
- Coordinates: 46°04′25″N 14°27′19″E
- Locale: Ljubljana, Slovenia
- Other name(s): Kauschegg Bridge
- Named for: Franz Kauschegg

History
- Built: 1901
- Rebuilt: 1993
- Collapsed: 29 May 1985

The Kavšek Bridge (Slovene: Kavškov most) or Kauschegg Bridge (Slovene: Kauscheggov most; the historical Slovene name inscribed on the bridge), sometimes listed as the Karchegger Bridge (Karcheggerjev most), is a one-arch stone bridge crossing Glinščica Creek in Podutik, a neighbourhood in Ljubljana, the capital of Slovenia. It was built by the board of the first district road and named after Franz Kauschegg (Franc Kavšek), who led the works. It is part of Podutik Street (Podutiška cesta) and is used as a walkway and for a bicycle lane; a new bridge for motorised traffic has been built next to it.

== Architecture ==
The bridge has low stone walls on both sides built from Glinica limestone blocks in two rows. On its southern wall stands a column with a relief of the Madonna and Child in a shrine on its top. On its base, an intercession to Mary in four verses has been carved. Also written are the year of construction of the bridge and the name of the stonemason, Alojzij Vodnik. The relief is a faithful copy of the original one and was restored by Julijan Renko. The base is original, whereas the upper part of the column with the shrine was made as part of the rebuilding by the Vodnik family from Kamna Gorica near Podutik. The north wall had a stone cross, which was demolished after World War II.

== History ==
The bridge was built in 1901 from local limestone under the direction of Franc Kauschegg, road committee member, and was used for road traffic until the 1960s. It collapsed on 29 May 1985. In 1993, it was rebuilt in its original form and opened for public use on 19 May 1993. Since August 2001, it has been protected as local cultural heritage.

== Gallery ==
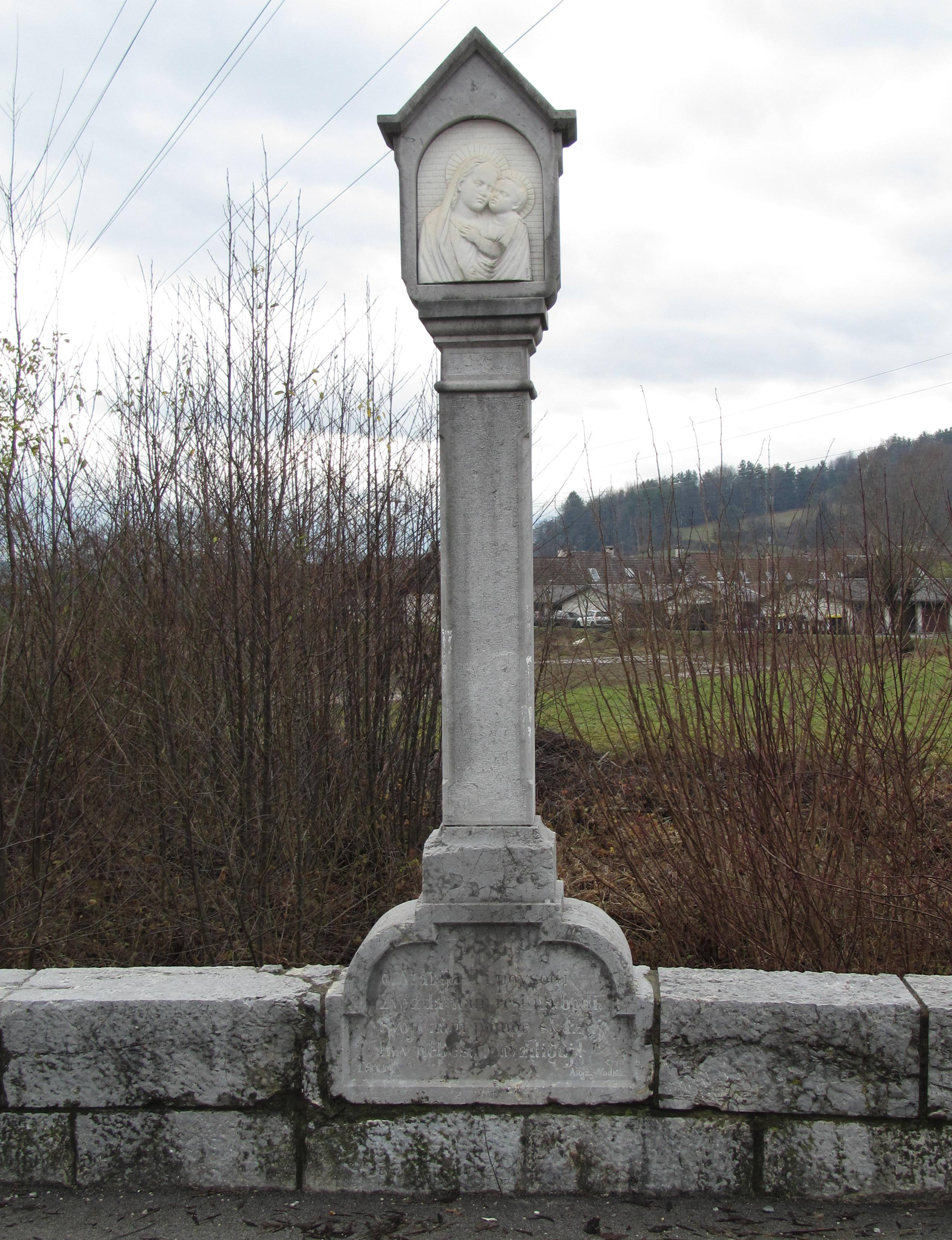
Southern side of the Kavšek Bridge

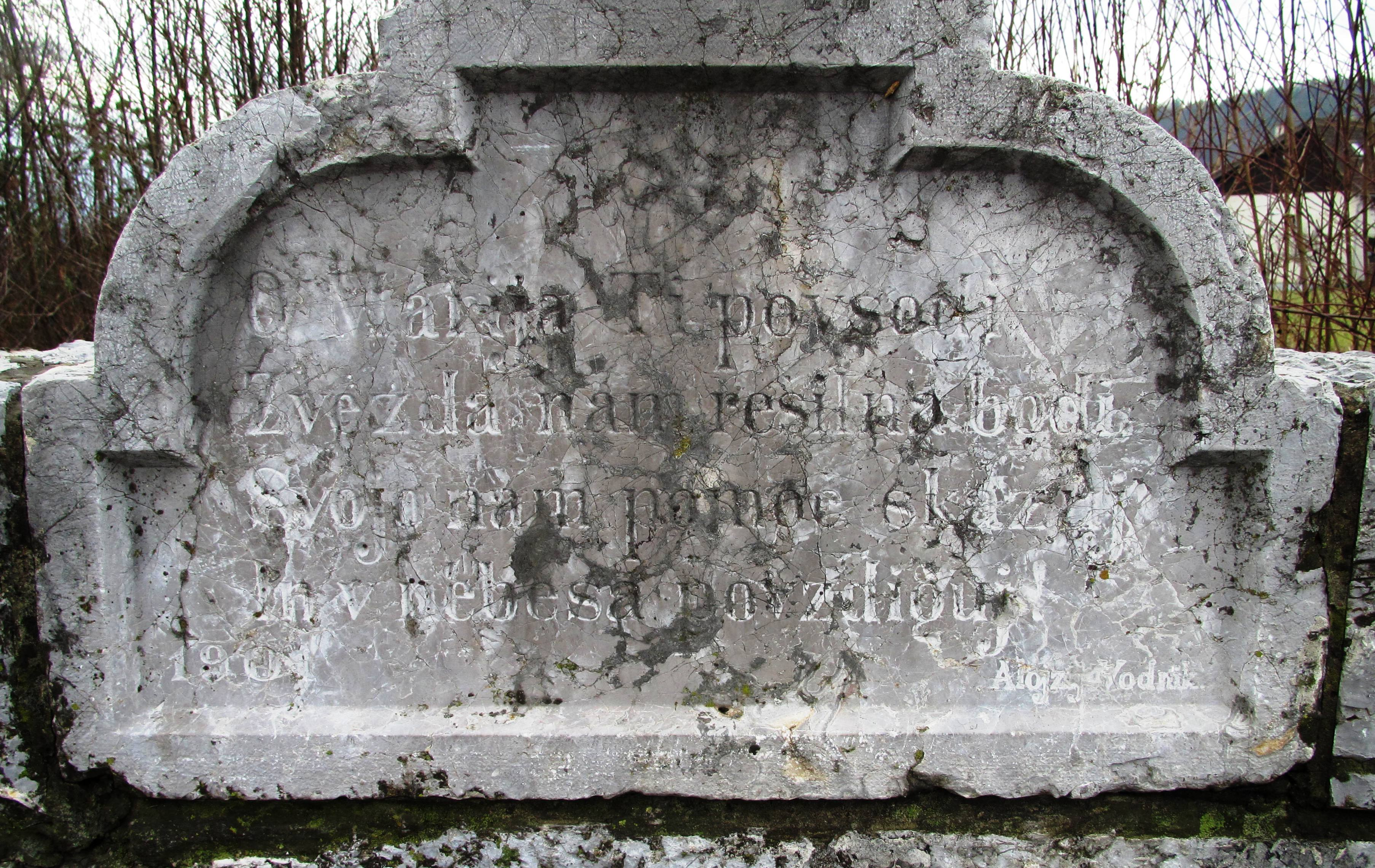
Inscription, southern side of the Kavšek Bridge. It is an intercession to Mary. Also written are the year of construction of the bridge and the name of the stonemanson, Alojz Vodnik.

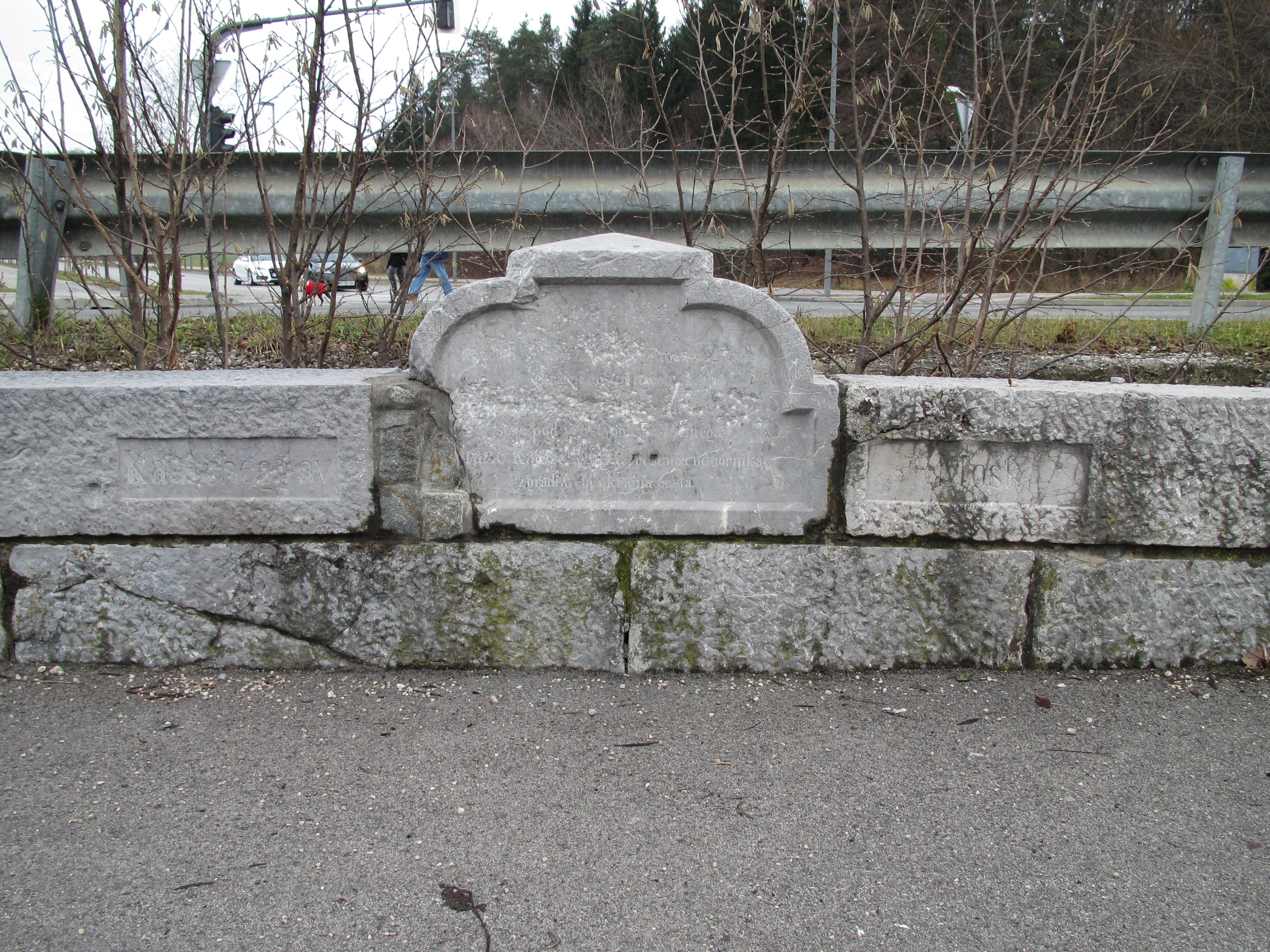
Northern side of the Kavšek Bridge. The two side panels read "Kauschegg Bridge."

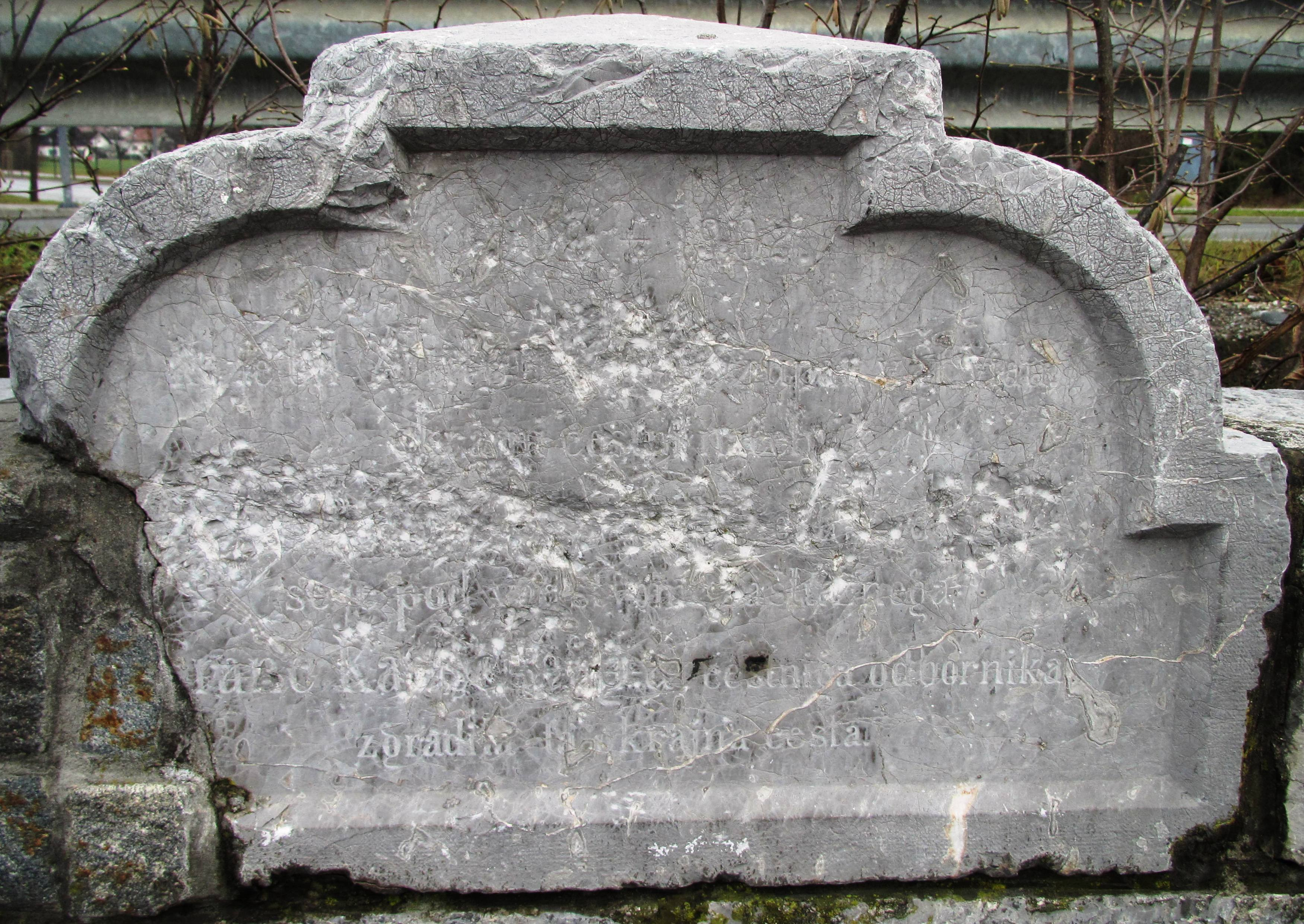
Inscription, northern side of the Kavšek Bridge. It reads "1900–1902. This district road was built under the leadership of the deserving Franc Kauschegg, road committee member, when Anton Belec, the mayor in St. Vid, was the district road commissioner."
