= Vitan Mal =

Slovene writer (born 1946)

- Born: 25 October 1946 (age 79) Ljubljana, Slovenia
- Occupation: Writer
- Genre: Children's literature

Vitan Mal (pronounced [ˈʋiːtan ˈmaːl]; born 25 October 1946) is a Slovene writer.

== Life ==
Vitan Mal was born on 25 October 1946 in the Rožna Dolina neighborhood of Ljubljana. After graduating from secondary school, he studied Slavic studies and librarianship at the University of Ljubljana's Faculty of Education. He has worked as a camera operator, a journalist, and an editor for the children and young people's program at Slovene national public broadcasting organization, Radiotelevizija Slovenija.

== Literary production ==
Mal established his reputation with picture books, primarily storybooks for young people. These mostly include novels about the problems faced by young people growing up today. Among younger children, his series of crime stories for children about agent Žardna. Some of his books have been translated from Slovene into other languages. For his youngest readers he wrote for various Slovene children's magazines including Ciciban, Kurirček, Pionirski list, Trobentica, and Zmajček. The print run of all of Mal's books exceeds 300,000 copies and, as part of the Slovene Bralna značka ('reading badge') reading program, he has appeared at nearly 500 schools and libraries.

Mal is generally considered the first Slovene write of juvenile literature that wrote, as he put it, "about apparently banal things such as having to pee, throwing up, and masturbation." Slovene juvenile literature experienced a rebirth in the 1980s in part due to Mal's contributions and distanced itself from a moralizing approach to upbringing. Young readers were attracted to his portrayal of young people as they really are, with all of their good and bad qualities.

His works for adults—Ganimed in drugi (Ganymede and Others), Za metuljem še Rok, and Nedokončana zgodba (An Unfinished Story)—were intended for a small circle of readers because they explore homoeroticism.

== Film and television ==
Mall worked as a professional camera operator and journalist for Radiotelevizija Slovenija (RTV), and then as an assistant cameraman for the series Erazem in potepuh (Erasmus and the Tramp) and the film Cvetje v jeseni (Autumn Blooms). He wrote several episodes for RTV for the series Kuhinja pri violinskem ključu (Cook on a Treble Clef), which was aired in 1974.

The film 1977 Sreča na vrvici (Happiness on a Leash) was based on Mal's 1975 story Teci, teci kuža moj (Run, Run, My Dog). This is Slovenia's commercially most successful film, with rights having been purchased in over fifty countries. Mal's book Ime mi je Tomaž (My Name is Thomas) was used by the director Tugo Štiglic (1946–) as basis for the screenplay for the films Poletje v školjki (Summer in a Shell) and Poletje v školjki 2 (Summer in a Shell 2), which became Slovene cult films in the 1980s.

== Personal life ==
Mal was investigated in 2012 for photographing children without permission at a Ljubljana elementary school and charges were filed against him. He was charged with possession of child pornography in 2013, and in 2014 he was found guilty and received a 2-year suspended sentence with a 5-year probation period.

== Works for children ==
- Ime mi je Tomaž (My Name is Thomas), 1972
- Teci, teci kuža moj (Run, Run, My Dog), 1975
- Roki Rok, 1976
- Mali veliki junak (The Little Big Hero), 1976
- Vanda (Wanda), 1982
- Sreča na vrvici (Happiness on a Leash), 1984
- Baronov mlajši brat (Baron's Little Brother), 1985
- Poletje v školjki (Summer in a Shell), 1986
- Školjka svetega Sebastijana (St. Sebastian's Shell), 1990
- Ledosned, 2006
- Na ranču veranda, 1993
- Hitro hitreje (Fast Faster), 1994
- Nedelje nekega poletja, 1996
- Ta grajski, 1998
- Dvojni agent Žardna (Double Agent Žardna), 1999
- Žigana (Ziggyanna), 2003
- Žardna in hiša duhov (Žardna and the Haunted House), 2003
- Žardna in ukradeni angel (Žardna and the Stolen Angel), 2005
- Žardna in Četrtek (Žardna and Thursday), 2006

== Works for adults ==
- Za metuljem še Rok, 1976
- Ganimed in drugi (Ganymede and Others), 1993
- Nedokončana zgodba (An Unfinished Story), 1999
- Napačna odločitev (A Wrong Decision), 2009
