= 2010 Slovenia floods =

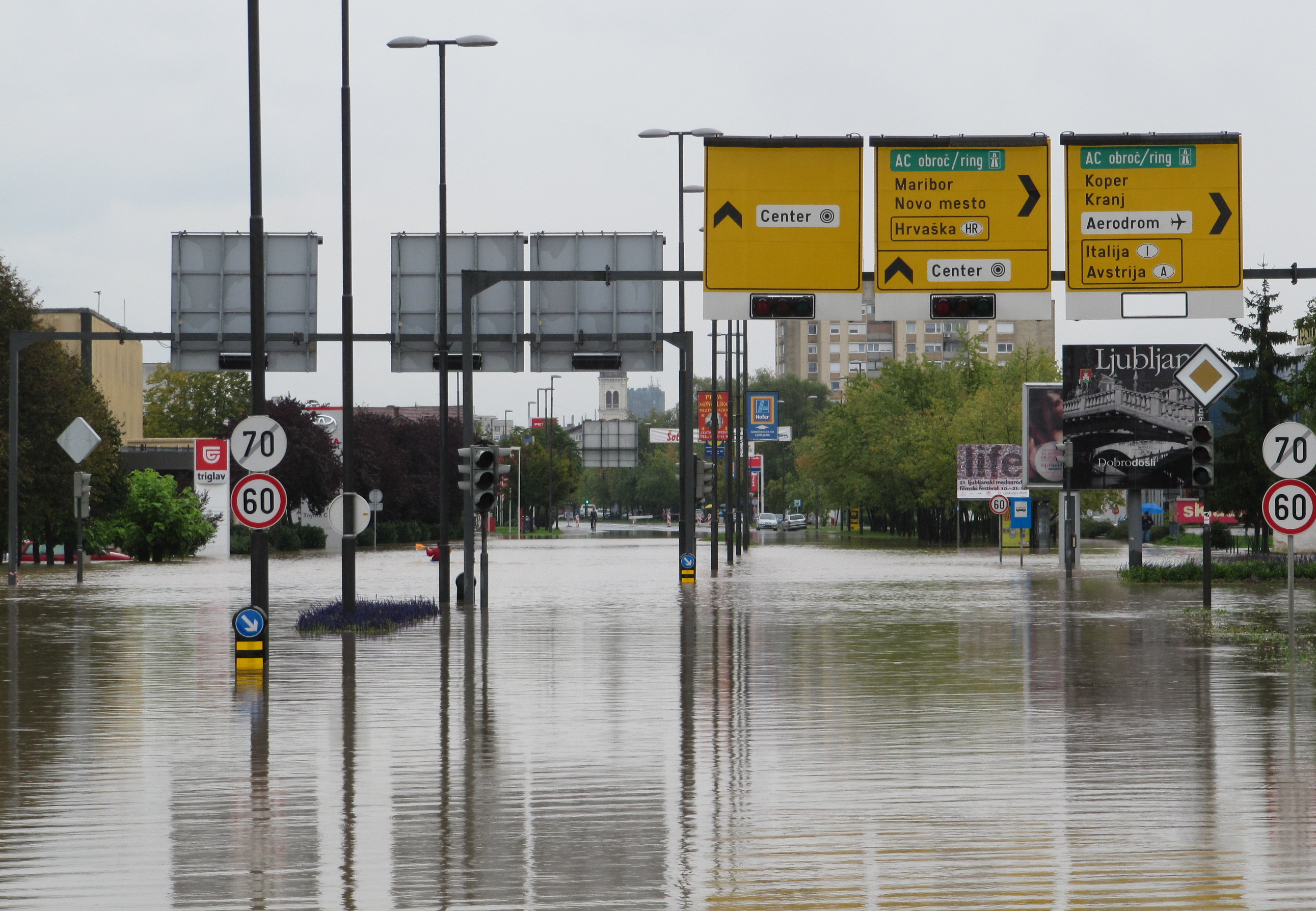
- Flooding of the Vič District in Ljubljana
- Date: 17–19 September 2010
- Location: Several regions of Slovenia, smaller part of Croatia
- Deaths: 3
- Property damage: €15 million (initial estimate)

The 2010 Slovenia floods, on the weekend of 17–19 September 2010, were caused by heavy rains in Slovenia, resulting in one of the worst floods in the country's history. Among the regions affected were the capital Ljubljana, the Central Sava Valley, Laško, the Slovene Littoral and Lower Carniola. Initial damage was estimated to reach €15 million. Three people died.

In Ljubljana, the river Gradaščica – together with the Mali Graben stream – flooded several parts of the Vič District, and record water levels were reached. Several transformers were shut down to prevent accidents, leaving some 3,000 people without electricity.

In Zagorje ob Savi, a great part of the town was flooded by the Sava river and several landslides were reported.

The town of Laško was flooded by the Savinja river and road connections were cut by the flood waters.

In the Littoral region, the Rižana and Dragonja rivers flooded several roads, closing all three border crossings with Croatia in the region. Parts of Portorož Airport and the Sečovlje salt fields were flooded as well. The Vipava River was flooding in the northern Littoral.

The Sava, Krka and Kolpa rivers flooded in the Lower Carniola. The towns of Krško, Brežice and Otočec were partially flooded.

In Upper Carniola, the town of Žiri was affected by the Poljane Sora. In Železniki, a town that was most affected in the floods exactly three years before, no bigger problems were reported.

Some parts of Croatia along the Sava river were also flooded, around 20 people were evacuated around Zagreb.

By Monday, 20 September, the water levels began to decrease, although landslides in some regions remained a threat. Four days after the flooding, the area of the Municipality of Dobrepolje was still 6 meters above the usual water-level.

== Gallery ==
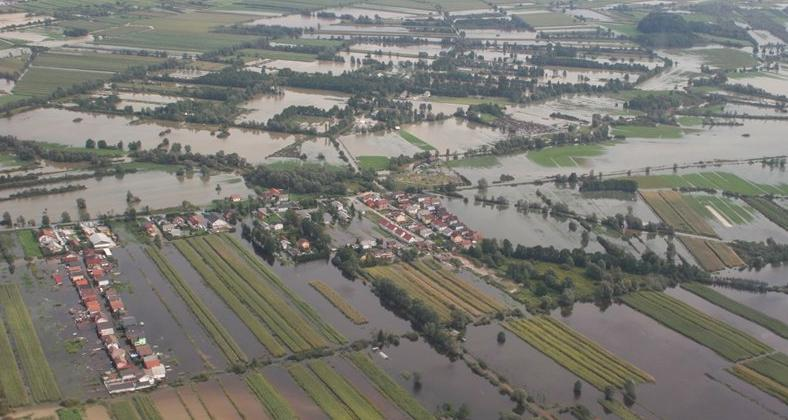
Slovenia was extensively flooded on the morning of 18 September 2010

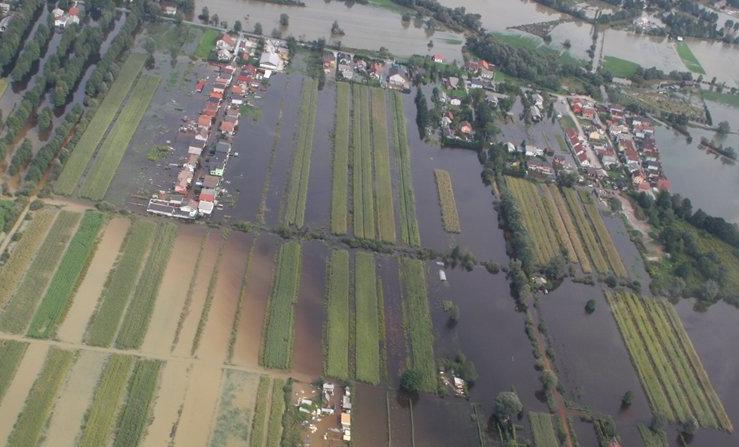
Floods affected more than 60 percents of the country

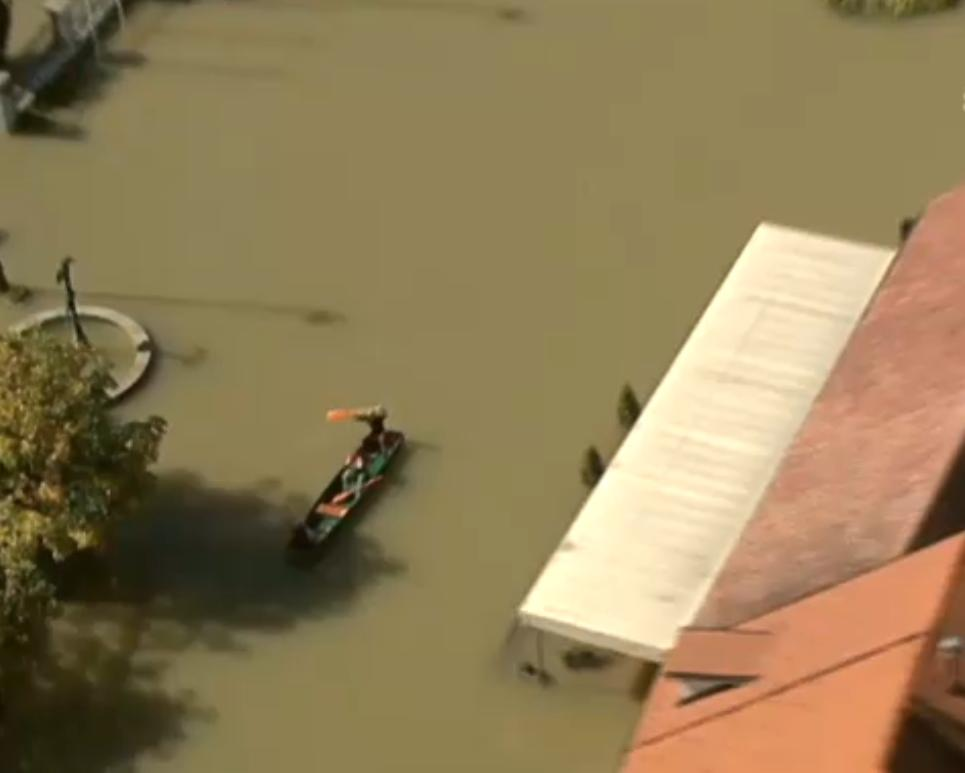
Many settlements were so flooded that people used boats as transport
