= Vič District =

Vič District Četrtna skupnost Vič
- District
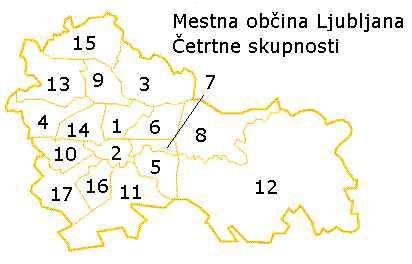
- Map of districts in Ljubljana. The Vič District is number 17.

- Location in Slovenia
- Coordinates: 46°2′11″N 14°29′06″E
- Country: Slovenia
- Traditional region: Upper Carniola
- Statistical region: Central Slovenia
- Municipality: Ljubljana

Area
  - Total: 14.38 km^{2} (5.55 sq mi)

Population (2014)
  - Total: 13,906

The Vič District (pronounced [ˈʋiːtʃ]; Slovene: Četrtna skupnost Vič), or simply Vič, is a district (mestna četrt) of the City Municipality of Ljubljana. It encompasses the western part of Ljubljana, the capital of Slovenia. It is named after the former village of Vič.

== Geography ==
The Vič District is bounded on the north by the railroad from Ljubljana to Sežana, the A2 Freeway, and the Gradaščica River; on the west by a line running through the farmland east of Fat Hill (Debeli hrib) and extending into the Ljubljana Marsh; on the south by the Ljubljanica River; and on the east by a line out of the marsh and continuing along Town Forest Street (Cesta v Mestni log), Gerbič Street (Gerbičeva ulica), the Gradaščica River, Marsh Street (Barjanska cesta), Aškerc Street (Aškerčeva cesta), and Bleiweis Street (Bleiweisova cesta). The district includes the former villages of Glince and Vič, and part of Kozarje (the hamlet of Žeje). It is part of the traditional region of Upper Carniola and is now included with the rest of the municipality in the Central Slovenia Statistical Region.

== Animal shelter ==
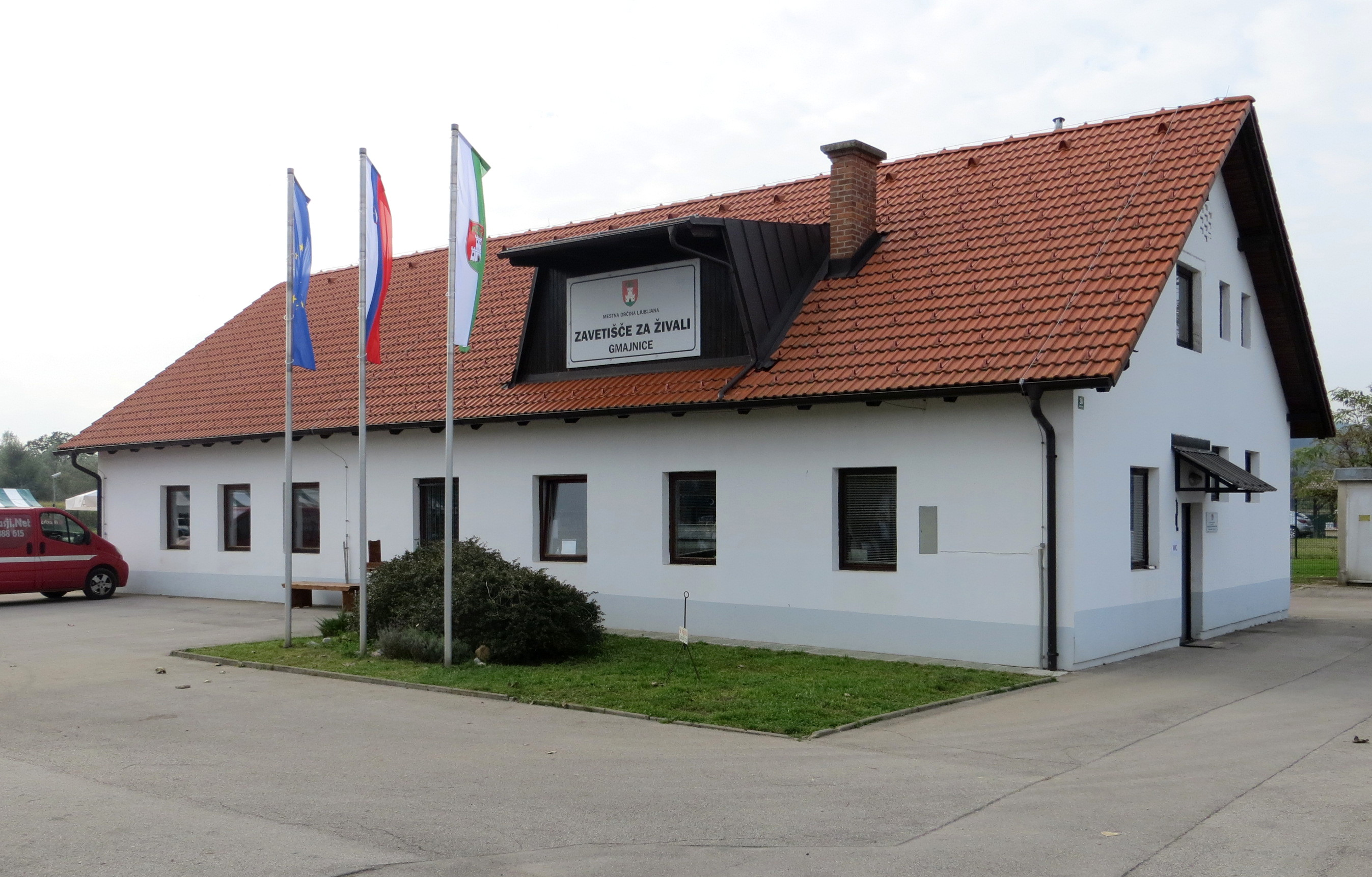
Animal shelter

The Ljubljana animal shelter (Slovene: Zavetišče za živali) is located on Gmajnice Road in the countryside in the east part of the Vič District. It was established in 2002 and is managed by the Ljubljana Zoo. It is accommodated in former stables of the Ljubljanske Mlekarne dairy company and cares for approximately 2,500 animals per year.
