= Rožnik District =

Rožnik District Četrtna skupnost Rožnik
- District
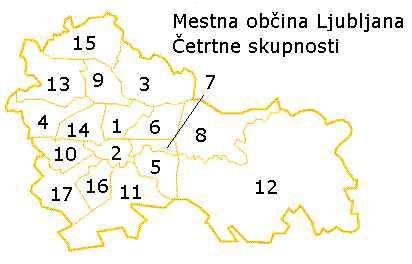
- Map of districts in Ljubljana. The Rožnik District is number 10.

- Location in Slovenia
- Coordinates: 46°2′57.89″N 14°27′43.72″E
- Country: Slovenia
- Traditional region: Upper Carniola
- Statistical region: Central Slovenia
- Municipality: Ljubljana

Area
  - Total: 8.35 km^{2} (3.22 sq mi)

Population (2014)
  - Total: 16,318

The Rožnik District (pronounced [ˈɾoːʒnik]; Slovene: Četrtna skupnost Rožnik), or simply Rožnik, is a district (mestna četrt) of the City Municipality of Ljubljana, the capital of Slovenia. It is named after Rožnik Hill.

== Geography ==
The Rožnik District is bounded on the southeast by the railroad from Ljubljana to Sežana; on the southwest by the A2 Freeway, the Gradaščica River, and a line across Utik Hill; and on the north by Youth Street (Mladinska ulica) and a line across Rožnik Hill. The district consists of much of Rožnik Hill, part of Tivoli City Park, the Ljubljana Zoo, the former villages of Bokalce, Grič, Rožna Dolina, and Vrhovci, and the neighborhood along Podrožnik Lane (Podrožniška pot) known as "Partizanska Vas" (literally, 'Partisan village').
