= Bokalce =

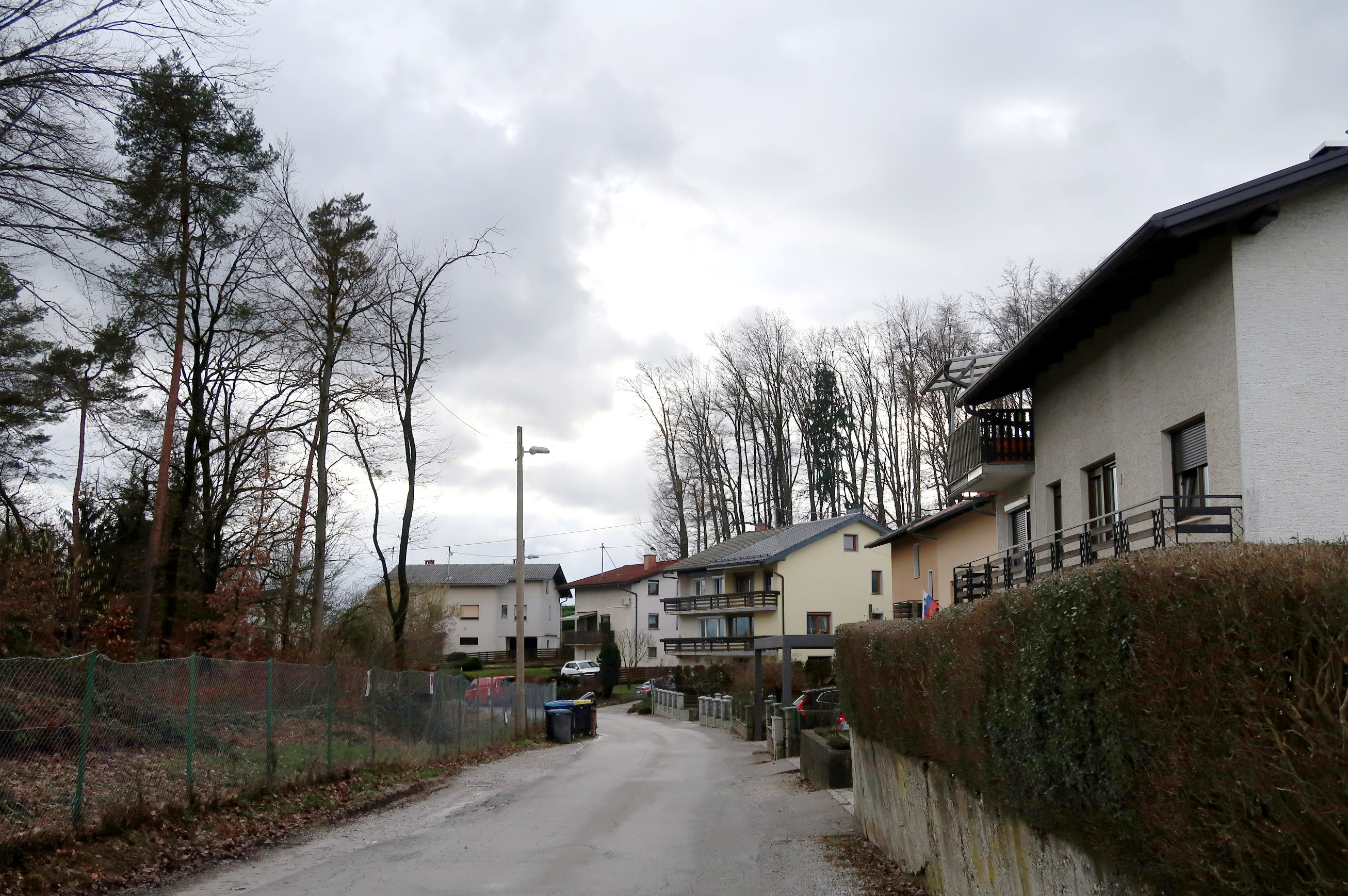

- Location in Slovenia
- Coordinates: 46°2′53″N 14°26′41″E
- Country: Slovenia
- Traditional region: Upper Carniola
- Statistical region: Central Slovenia
- Municipality: Ljubljana
- Elevation: 320 m (1,050 ft)

Bokalce (pronounced [bɔˈkaːu̯tsɛ], in older sources also Bokalci, German: Strobelhof) is a formerly independent settlement in the southwest part of the capital Ljubljana in central Slovenia. It is part of the traditional region of Upper Carniola and is now included with the rest of the municipality in the Central Slovenia Statistical Region.

== Geography ==
Bokalce is centered around Bokalce Castle, with which it shares its name. It stands on a rise above the Gradaščica River and below the south slope of Tičnica Hill (356 meters or 1,168 feet).

== Name ==
Bokalce was mentioned in written sources as Wokhauez in 1548, Bokaliz in 1580, and Wokhalez in 1697. The name Bokalce is of uncertain origin. It may be a metathesis of the surname Kobal, or perhaps derived from the common noun bok 'end of a hill', referring to its position at the edge of Utik Hill. Another hypothesis suggests that the name may be derived from the word bukev 'beech', referring the local vegetation.

== History ==
The history of Bokalce is largely tied to that of Bokalce Castle. A retirement home was built in Bokalce in 1939, and in 1959 the agricultural holdings in Bokalce were incorporated into a collective farm. Bokalce was annexed by Vrhovci in 1953, ending its existence as an independent settlement. Vrhovci itself was annexed by the City of Ljubljana in 1961.
