= Mali Graben =

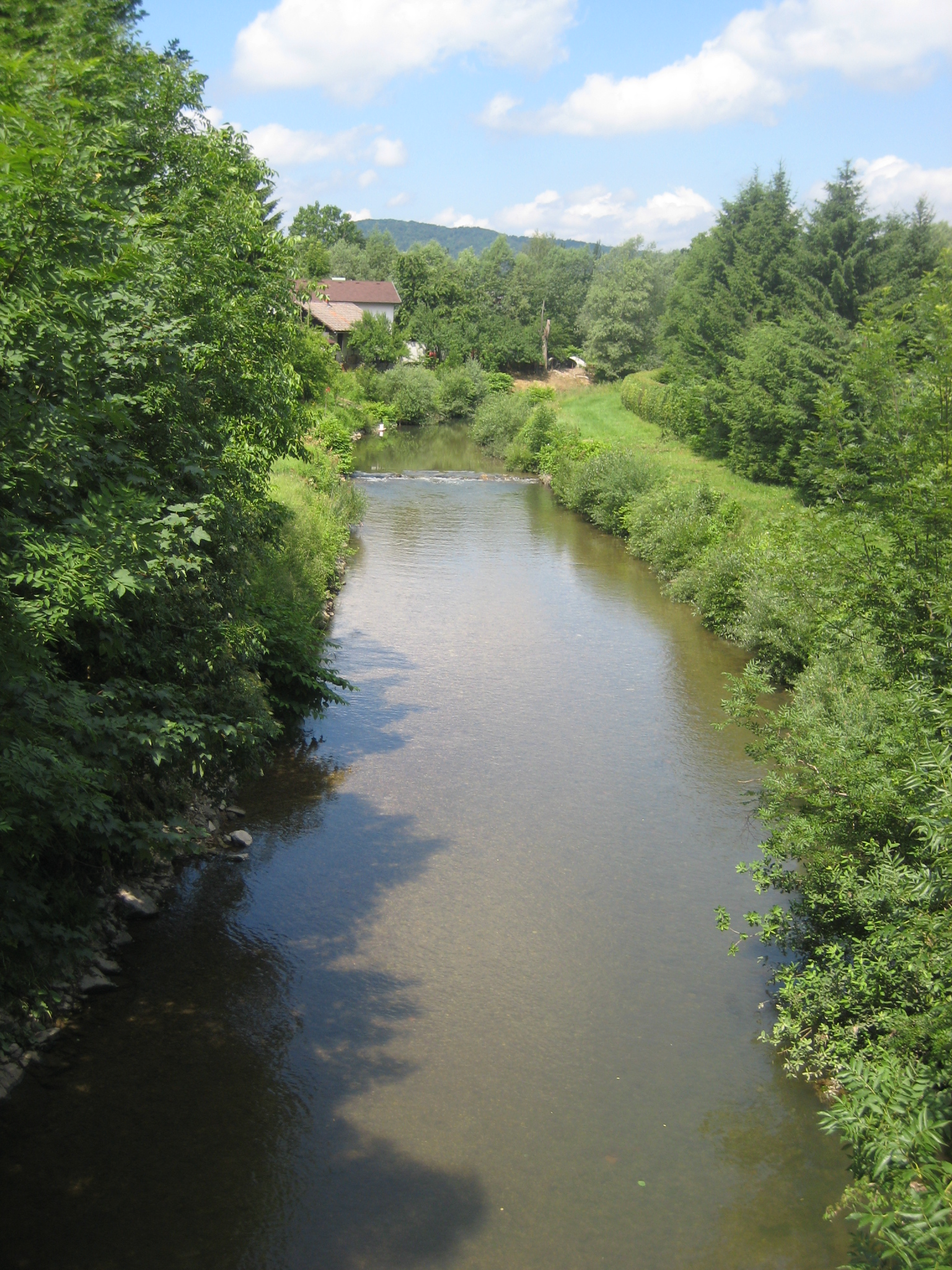
- The Mali Graben at Dolgi Most

Location
- Country: Slovenia

Physical characteristics
- Source
  - location: Gradaščica (in the vicinity of the Bokalce Castle)
- Mouth
  - location: Ljubljanica (in the vicinity of the Gruber Canal
  - coordinates: 46°2′15.4″N 14°30′36.7″E

Basin features
- Progression: Ljubljanica→ Sava→ Danube→ Black Sea

Mali Graben (Slovene: Mali graben) is a creek and a natural branch of the Gradaščica River in southwest Ljubljana. It flows south of and parallel to the Gradaščica and is the largest affluent of the Ljubljanica River. It is also known as Stržen (literally, 'thalweg') and Mala voda ('Little Creek').

The creek is a natural channel. It splits from the Gradaščica not far from Bokalce Castle, then flows across the southern part of the Murgle residential district and joins the Ljubljanica from the left side near the Gruber Canal. Most of the water from the Gradaščica is diverted into Mali Graben, helping to alleviate flooding of the Trnovo District in Ljubljana.

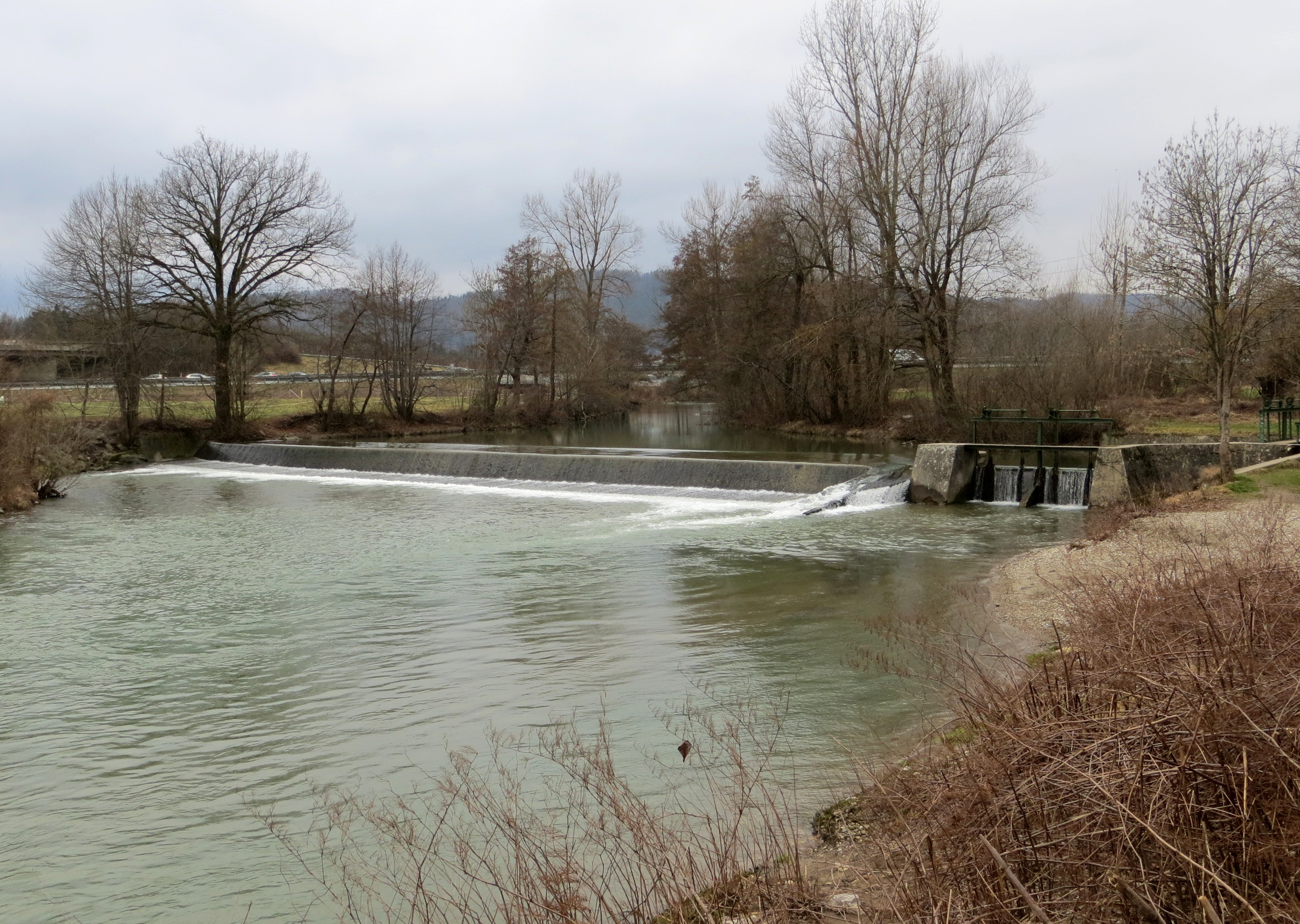
Beginning of the Mali Graben west of the Vrhovci neighborhood in the west part of Ljubljana
