= Rooster Bridge =

Bridge in Ljubljana, Slovenia

Coordinates: 46°2′36.31″N 14°30′12.84″E

The Rooster Bridge (1931) connects Krakovo and Trnovo.

The Rooster Bridge (Slovene: Petelinji most, Petelinja brv, Petelinov most, Tenente) in Ljubljana, the capital of Slovenia, is a footbridge crossing the Gradaščica River in the Trnovo District south of the downtown of Ljubljana. It stands between the Trnovo Bridge and the outflow of the Gradaščica into the Ljubljanica, and connects Gradaščica Street (Gradaška ulica) in the northern Krakovo neighbourhood (left bank) to Eipper Street (Eipprova ulica) in the southern Trnovo neighbourhood (right bank). These are the oldest Ljubljana suburbs, known for their market gardens and cultural events.

== Name ==
The Rooster Bridge was named for a nearby inn (at 10 Gradaščica Street), known as Pri petelinu 'At the Rooster'. The alternate name Tenente is derived from the former Lieutenant's Inn (Pri Tenenteju).

== History and design ==
A sketch of the Rooster Bridge by Plečnik (1928)

A wooden footbridge stood at the site until 1931. The current structure, which replaced it in November that year, was built by the constructor Matko Curk according to plans by the architect Jože Plečnik, who had designed it as part of his Water Axis along the Ljubljanica. It is a simple iron and concrete footbridge, supported by two horseshoe-like arches and a strong fence, which consists of concrete boundary markers, linked with a metal pipe. As Plečnik's heritage, it has been protected as cultural heritage of national significance since 2009.
