= Vrhovci =

Vrhovci may refer to:

- Vrhovci, Slovenia, a village near Črnomelj
- Vrhovci, Ljubljana, a former village in Ljubljana, Slovenia
- Vrhovci, Croatia, a village near Čabar
