= Rožnik (hill) =

Hill in Ljubljana, Slovenia

Coordinates: 46°3′20.28″N 14°28′36.88″E

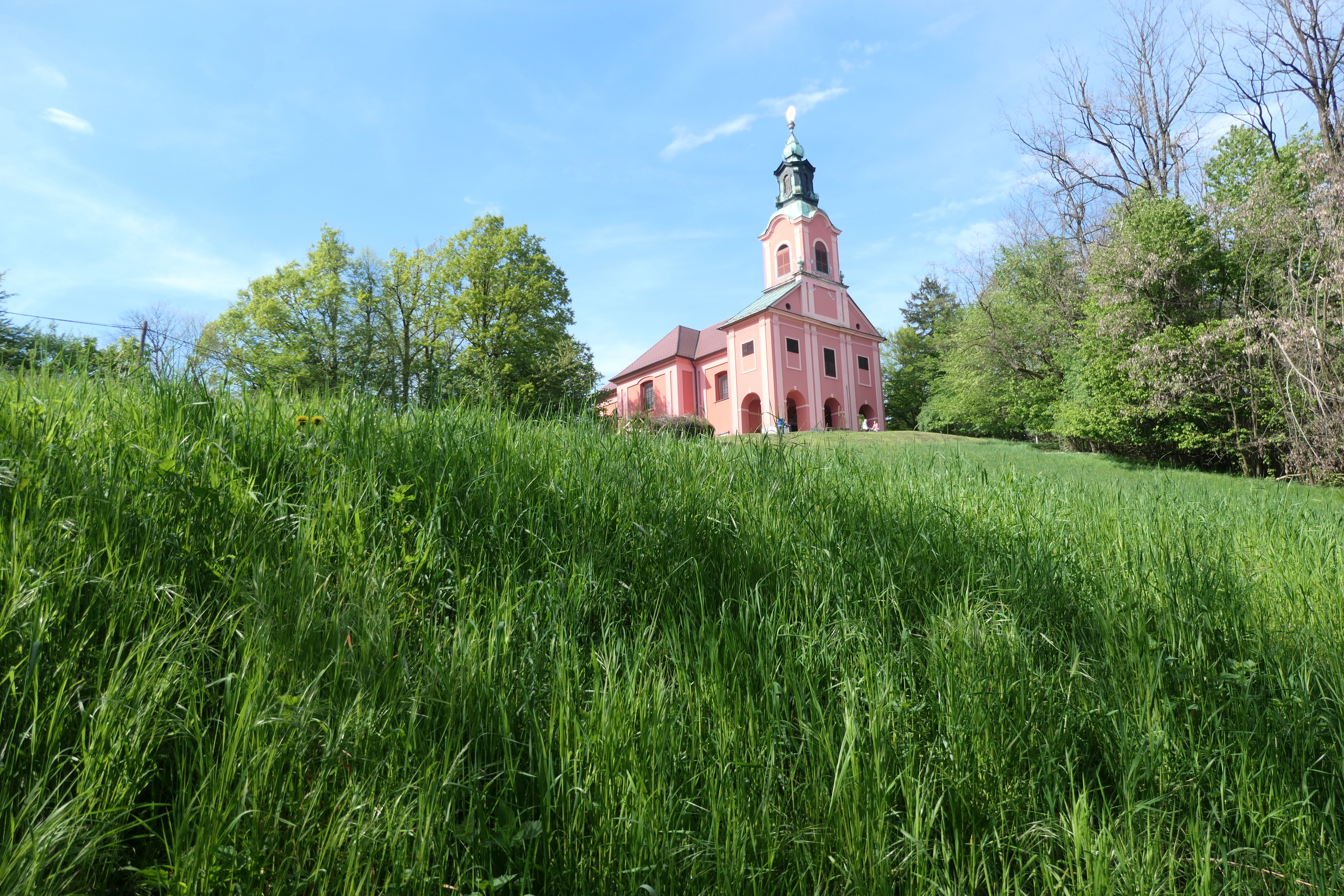
Visitation Church on Cankar Peak

Rožnik (pronounced [ˈɾoːʒnik]) is a hill in the Rožnik District and Šiška District northwest of the Ljubljana city center. Together with Tivoli City Park, it forms Tivoli–Rožnik Hill–Šiška Hill Landscape Park. Extending from Tivoli Park, it is a popular hiking, running, and excursion destination for residents of Ljubljana.

== Name ==
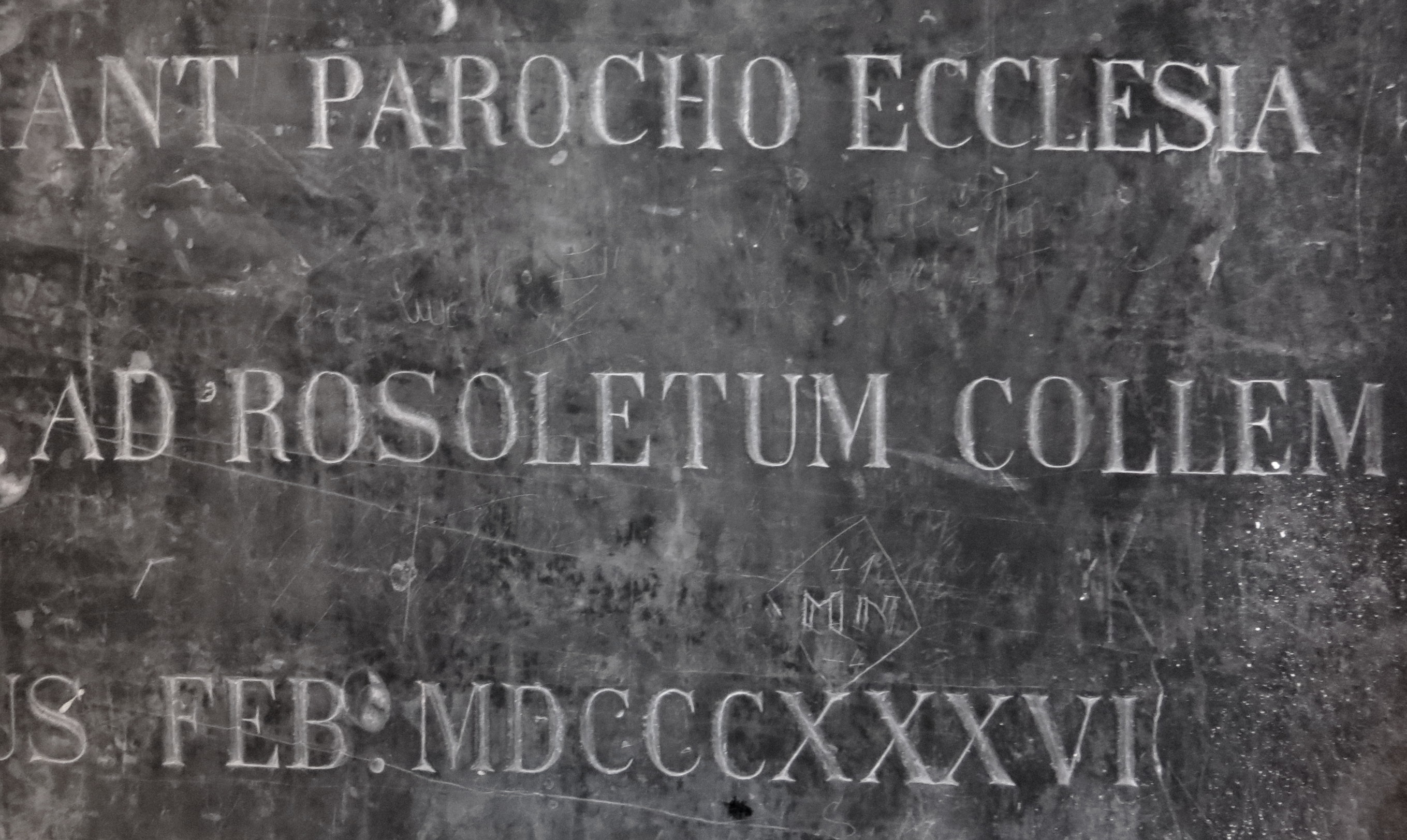
1836 inscription in Visitation Church: ad Rosoletum Collem (at Rožnik Hill)

Rožnik Hill was attested in written sources in 1326 as Rosenberch. The Slovene name is a translation from the German name Rosenberg, originally a compound of Middle High German rôse 'rose' and berc 'mountain, hill'. In modern German, the hill was known as Rosenbach.

== Geography ==
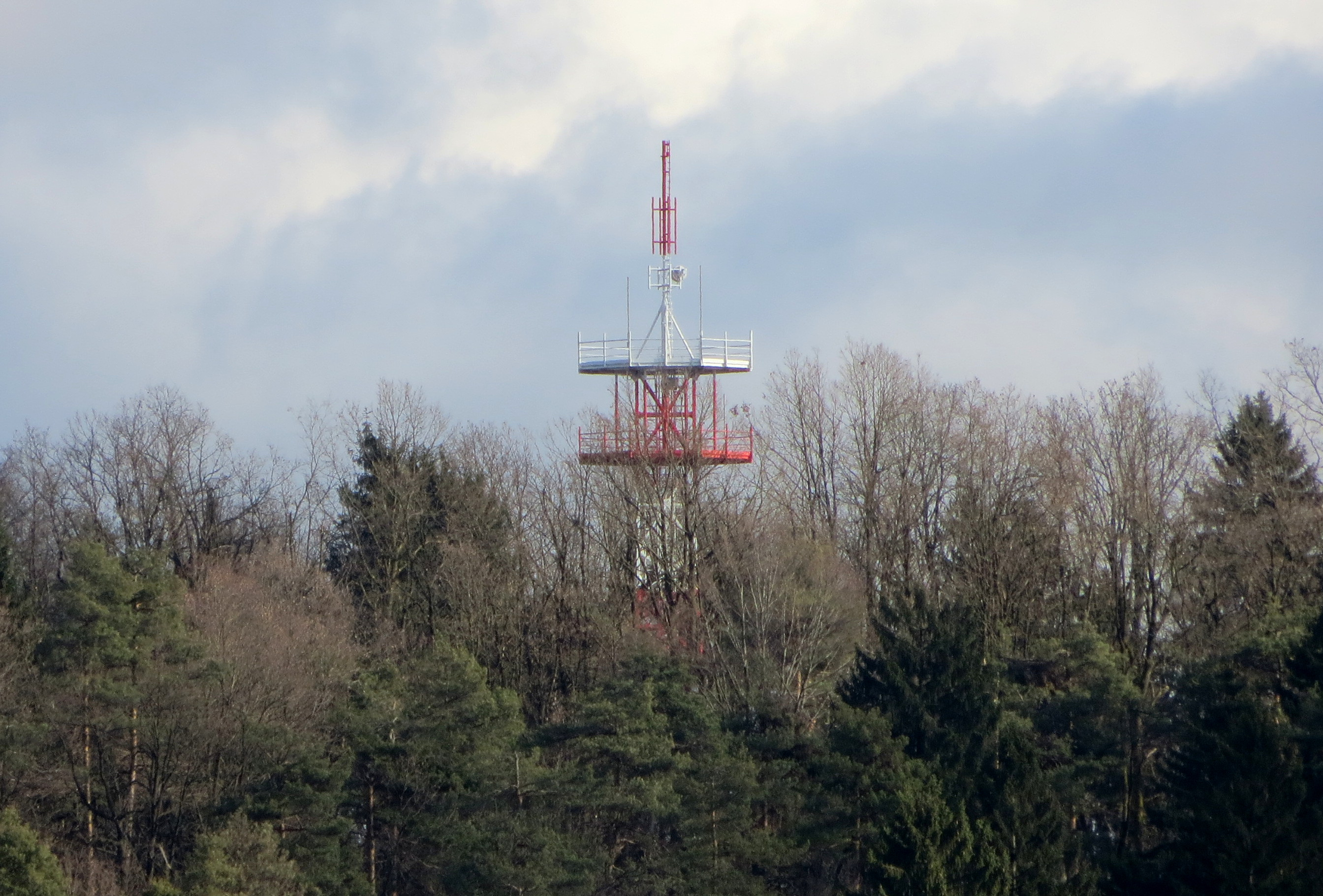
Transmitter tower on Šiška Hill

The hill has two peaks, called Šiška Hill (Slovene: Šišenski hrib, 429 m) and Cankar Peak (Slovene: Cankarjev vrh, 394 m). Cankar Peak was formerly known as Zgornji Rožnik ('upper Rožnik', German: Oberrosenbach), in contrast to Spodnji Rožnik ('lower Roznik'; also known as Podrožnik, German: Unterrosenbach) at the base of the hill, where the Čad Inn is located. On Cankar Peak stand Visitation Church and an inn where the writer Ivan Cankar lived between 1910 and 1917. Below it, on the southern slope of the hill, is the Ljubljana Zoo.

== Events ==
- May 1: On May Day, a bonfire is lit on Cankar Peak and a festival is held in the nearby meadow.
- June 21: A summer solstice ceremony takes place with a bonfire on Cankar Peak to celebrate the winners of the Kresnik Award, named after the Slavic pagan deity Kresnik, invoking Slavic pagan ceremonies from before Christianization.
- December 26: Horses are blessed on Saint Stephen's Day in front of Visitation Church.
