= Visitation of Mary Church (Ljubljana) =

Church in Ljubljana, Slovenia

Coordinates: 46°3′18.71″N 14°28′38.39″E

Church of the Visitation of the Blessed Virgin Mary
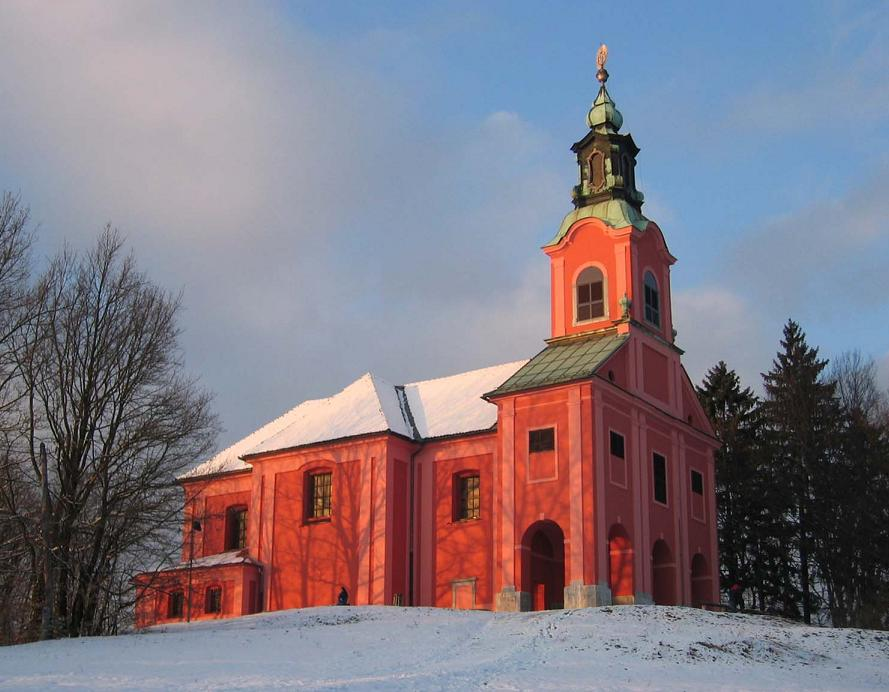
- Interactive map of the Church of the Visitation of the Blessed Virgin Mary area

General information
- Architectural style: Baroque
- Location: Rožnik Hill / Ljubljana, Slovenia
- Completed: 1747
- Client: Roman Catholic Archdiocese of Ljubljana

Technical details
- Structural system: Brick and reinforced concrete

Visitation of Mary Church (Slovene: cerkev Marijinega obiskanja) is a Roman Catholic pilgrimage church under the authority of the Roman Catholic Archdiocese of Ljubljana, located on Rožnik Hill in Ljubljana, Slovenia.

== History ==
A church was already recorded on Rožnik Hill in a 1526 document, stating that it had to provide a copper chalice and three pounds of hellers for the war effort. This church was razed in 1740, and a new church was built in 1746 according to plans by Candido Zulliani (1712–1769) and consecrated by Bishop Ernest Attems (1742–1757) in 1747. The church was damaged by artillery fire during the Napoleonic siege of Ljubljana, and after its 1814 renovation it was given a Neoclassical facade. Management of the church was taken over by the Franciscans in 1826, and in 1836 it was transferred to the order as a chapel of ease. New altars were installed in the church in 1895.

== Gallery ==
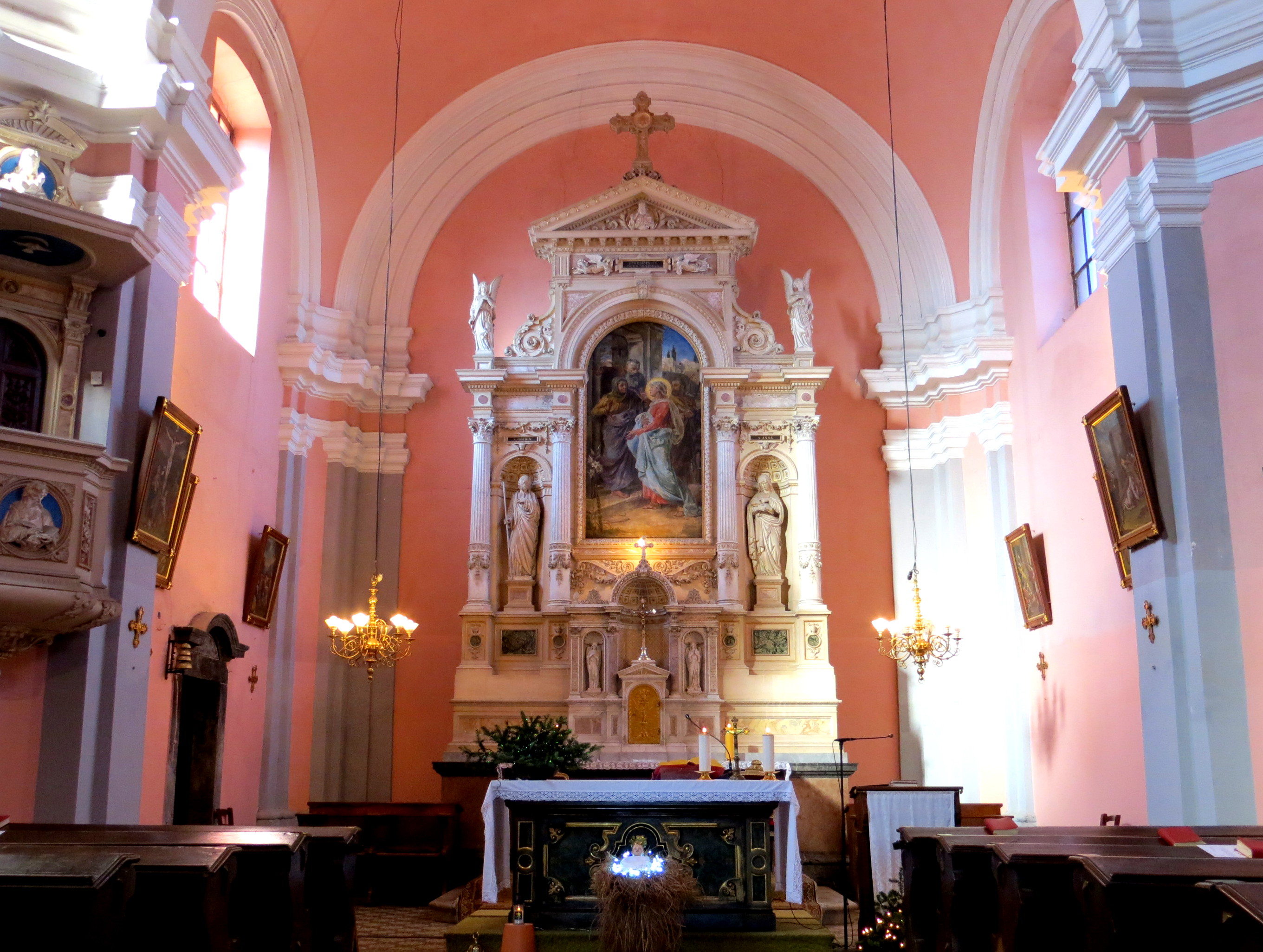
Chancel and apse

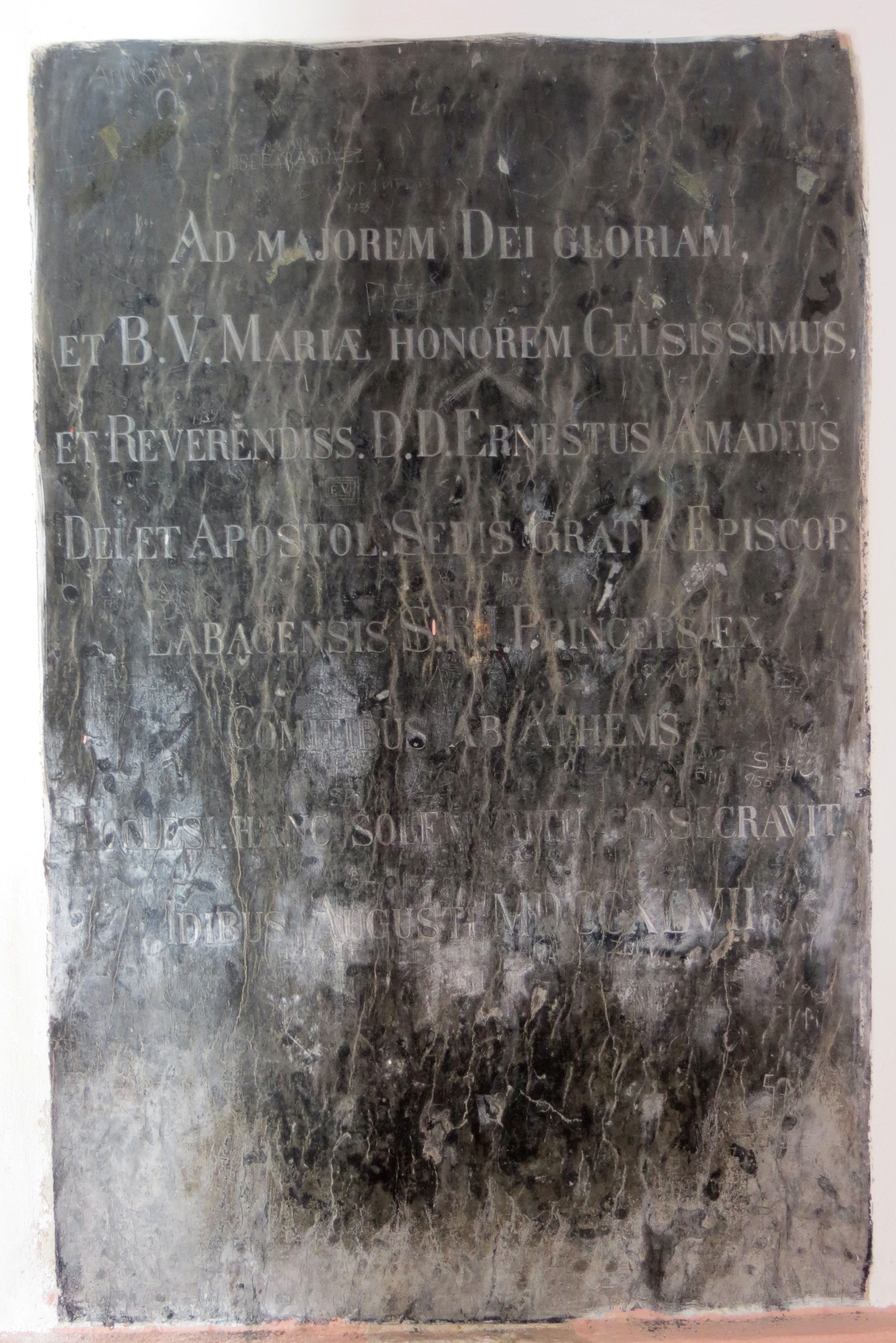
Plaque, consecration (1747)

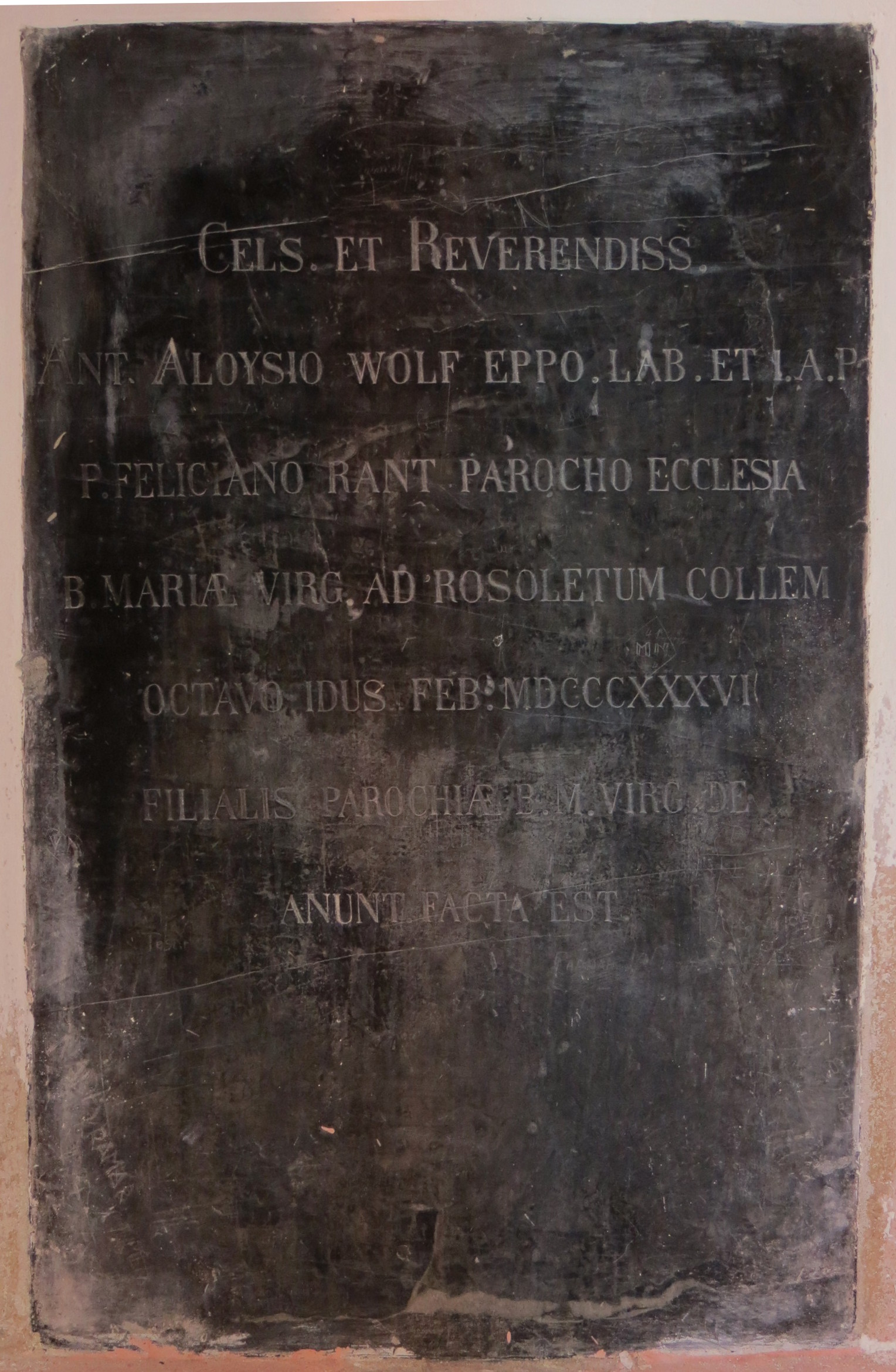
Plaque, chapel of ease status (1836)
