= Jek Bridge =

Bridge in Slovenia

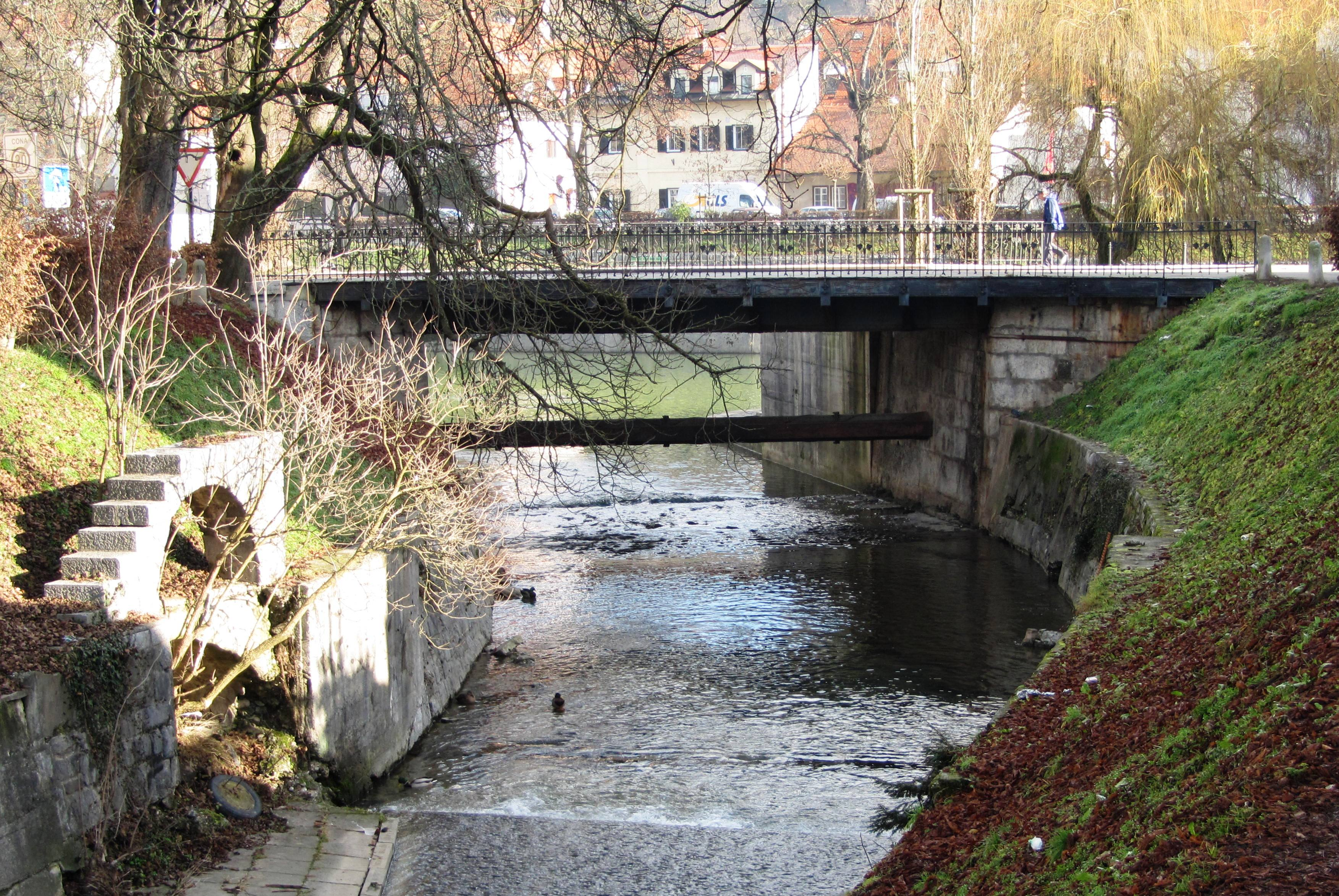
- The Jek Bridge
- Coordinates: 46°02′38″N 14°30′19″E
- Crosses: Gradaščica
- Locale: Ljubljana, Slovenia
- Other name(s): Razorec Bridge

History
- Built: 1903

The Jek Bridge (Slovene: Jekarski most; also Jeklarski most, Jekavski most, Razorčev most 'Razorec Bridge') is a bridge crossing the Gradaščica River in Ljubljana, the capital of Slovenia. The current structure was built in 1903 at the site of an earlier wooden bridge.

== Etymology ==
The various names are derived from the toponym na Jeku (literally, 'on the hill' < German Ecke), which referred to a nearby wharf, and from the former Razorec Inn, located at Church Street (Cerkvena ulica) no. 1, today (Ernest) Eypper Street (Eipprova ulica).
