= Vrhovci (Ljubljana) =

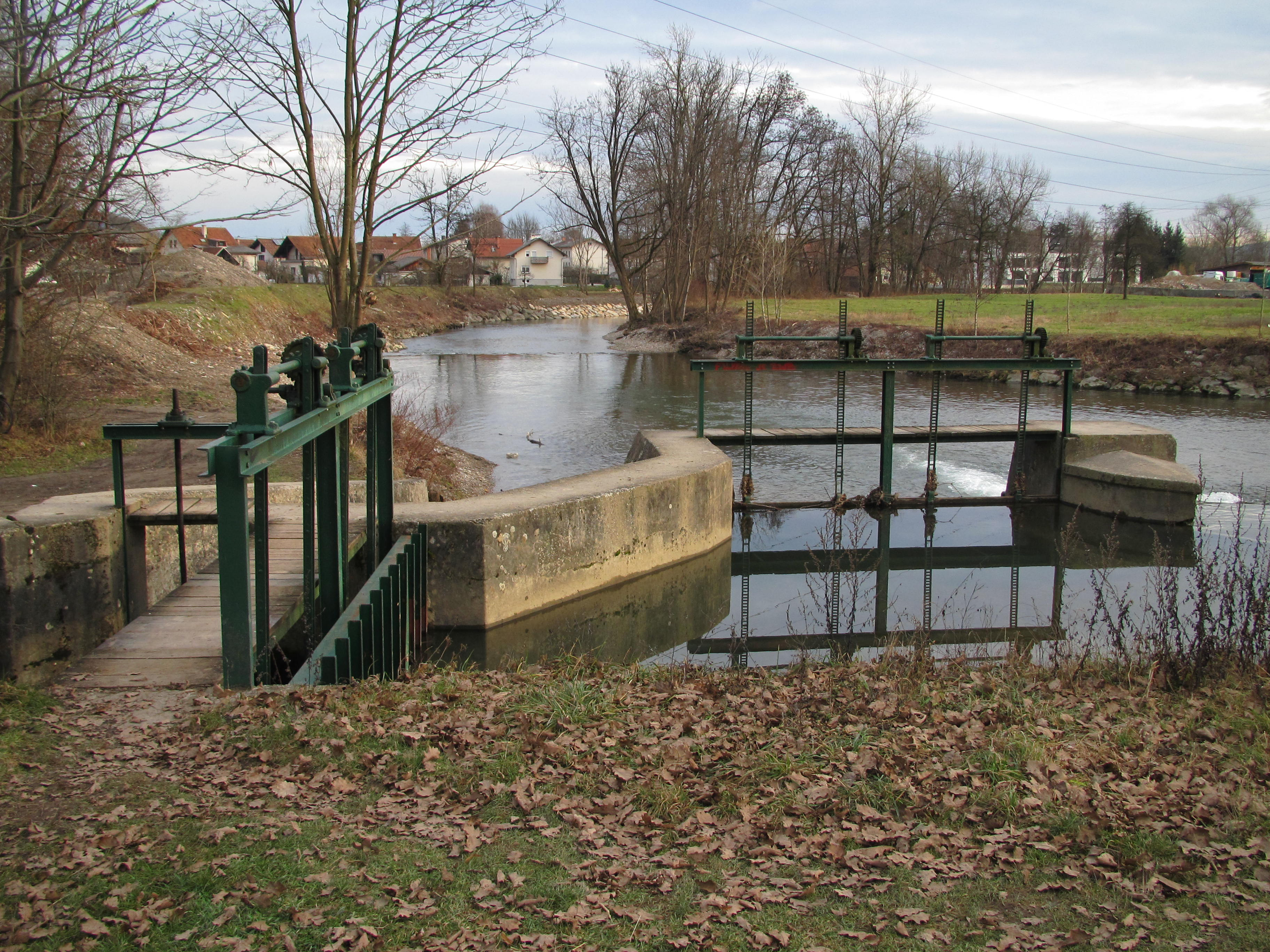
- Beginning of the Mali Graben near Weir Street (Pod jezom) in Vrhovci

- Location in Slovenia
- Coordinates: 46°2′34.44″N 14°27′32.70″E
- Country: Slovenia
- Traditional region: Upper Carniola
- Statistical region: Central Slovenia
- Municipality: Ljubljana
- Elevation: 310 m (1,020 ft)

Vrhovci (pronounced [ʋəɾˈxoːu̯tsi]) is a formerly independent settlement in the southwest part of the capital Ljubljana in central Slovenia. It is part of the traditional region of Upper Carniola and is now included with the rest of the municipality in the Central Slovenia Statistical Region. It includes the territory of Bokalce Castle (German: Strobelhof).

== Geography ==
Vrhovci consists of two parts. The older part lies on the Vič Terrace (Slovene: Viška terasa). In the past it had fields and was characterized by farming. The newer part of the settlement developed along the road from Vič to Stranska Vas behind the brick factory, and was settled by craftsmen and laborers. The land is somewhat swampy along the Gradaščica River.

== Name ==
Vrhovci was mentioned in written sources in 1763–87 as Verhovatz. It is a masculine plural name based on the common noun vrhovec 'settlers on peaks/hilltops', thus referring to the local geography.

== History ==
Vrhovci was annexed by the City of Ljubljana in 1961, ending its existence as an independent settlement.
