= Gradaščica =

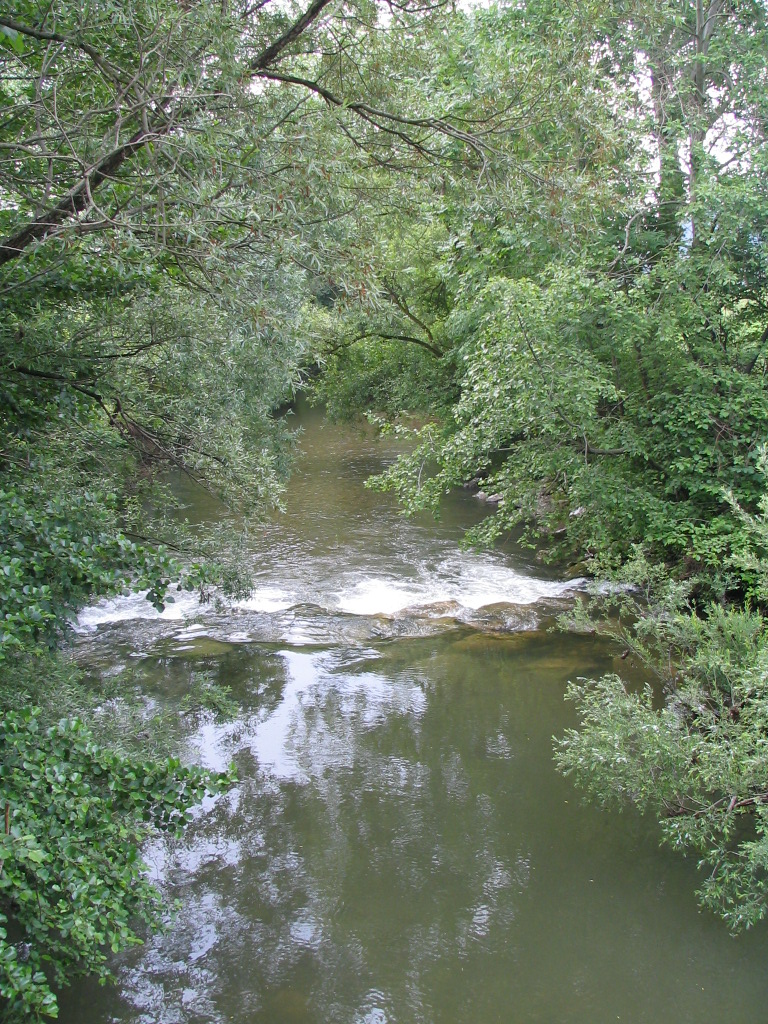
- The Gradaščica near Stranska Vas

Location
- Country: Slovenia

Physical characteristics
- Source
  - elevation: 737 metres (2,418 ft)
- Mouth
  - location: Ljubljanica
  - coordinates: 46°2′38″N 14°30′20″E
  - elevation: 287 metres (942 ft)
- Length: 33 km (21 mi)

Basin features
- Progression: Ljubljanica→ Sava→ Danube→ Black Sea

The Gradaščica is a river in Slovenia. The river is 33 km (21 mi) long. It begins in Polhov Gradec at the confluence of Little Creek (Slovene: Mala Voda) and Big Božna Creek. Near Vrhovci it is joined by Horjulščica Creek (also known as Horjulka Creek). Not far past Bokalce, most of the stream is split off into the Mali Graben and the rest continues as the Gradaščica (also known as the Mestna Gradaščica 'Town Gradaščica'). This continues through the Vrhovci neighborhood into the Vič District, where it is joined by Glinščica Creek, before continuing into the Trnovo District and emptying into the Ljubljanica.

== Name ==
The Gradaščica was attested in historical sources as min[us] flum[en] dict[um] Laybach in 1271, flumen minus dictum Laybach in 1277, mino[r] Laybac[us] in 1330, and chlain Laiboch in 1397, all meaning 'little Ljubljanica'. The names Gradaschitza and Grabaschitza are attested in 1763–1787. The name Gradaščica is a univerbation of *Gradaška voda '(Polhov) Gradec River', derived from its headwaters in Polhov Gradec.

== History ==
In 2022, torrential rains caused the river to flood, with unusually severe flooding downstream.

== Gallery ==
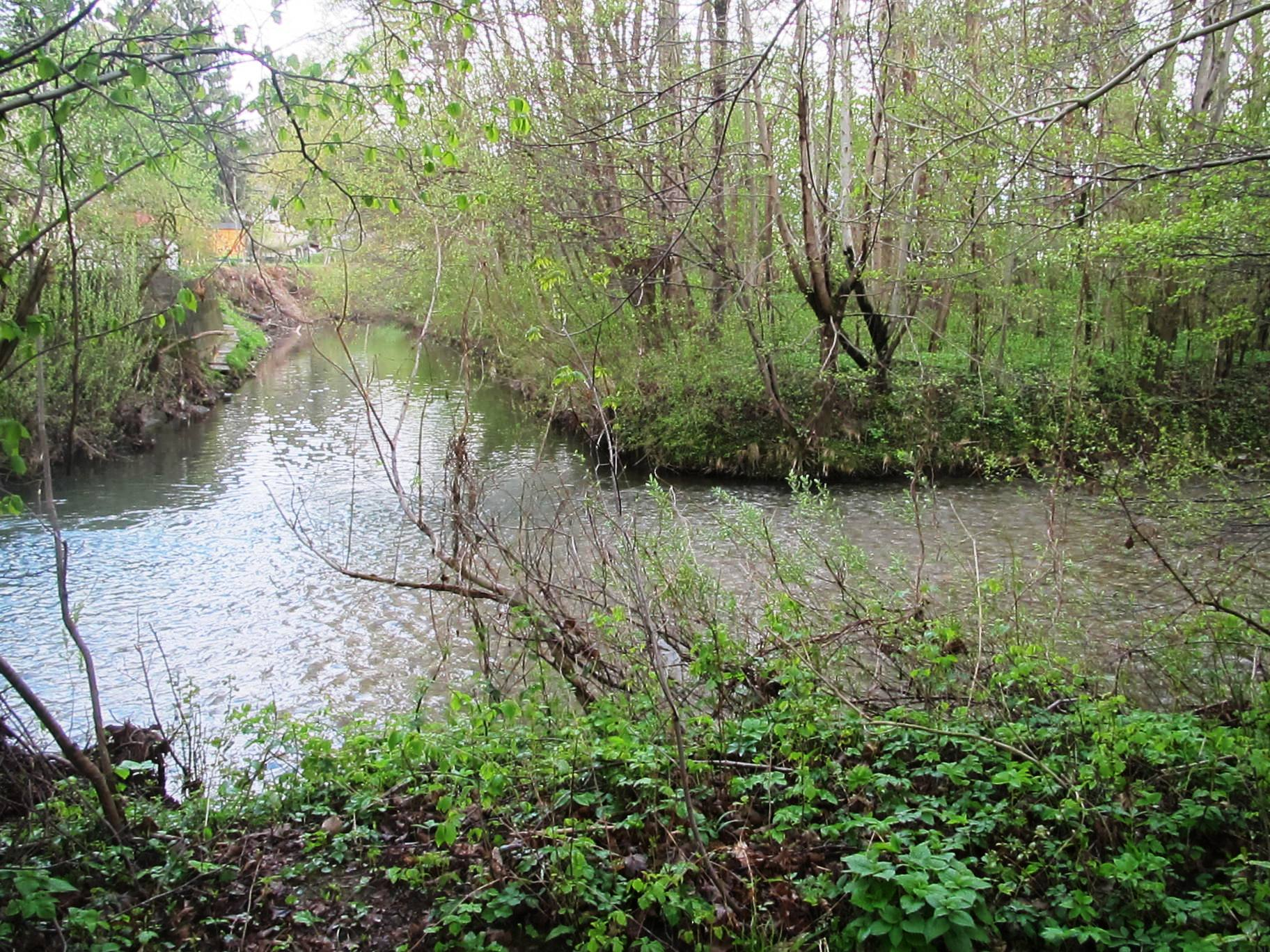
Confluence of Horjulščica Creek (left) with the Gradaščica (right)

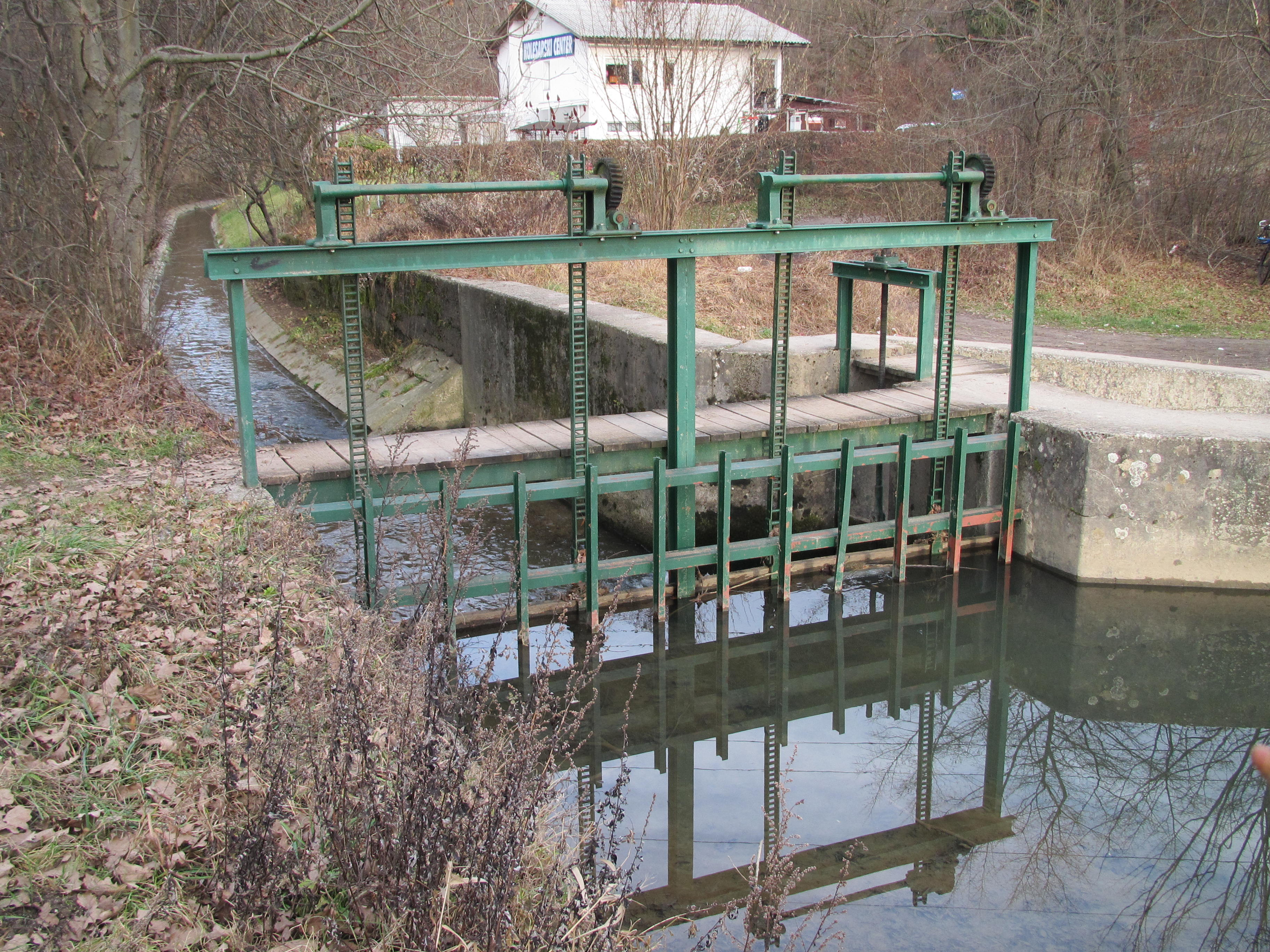
Beginning of the "Town Gradaščica" (left) in the Vrhovci neighborhood of Vič

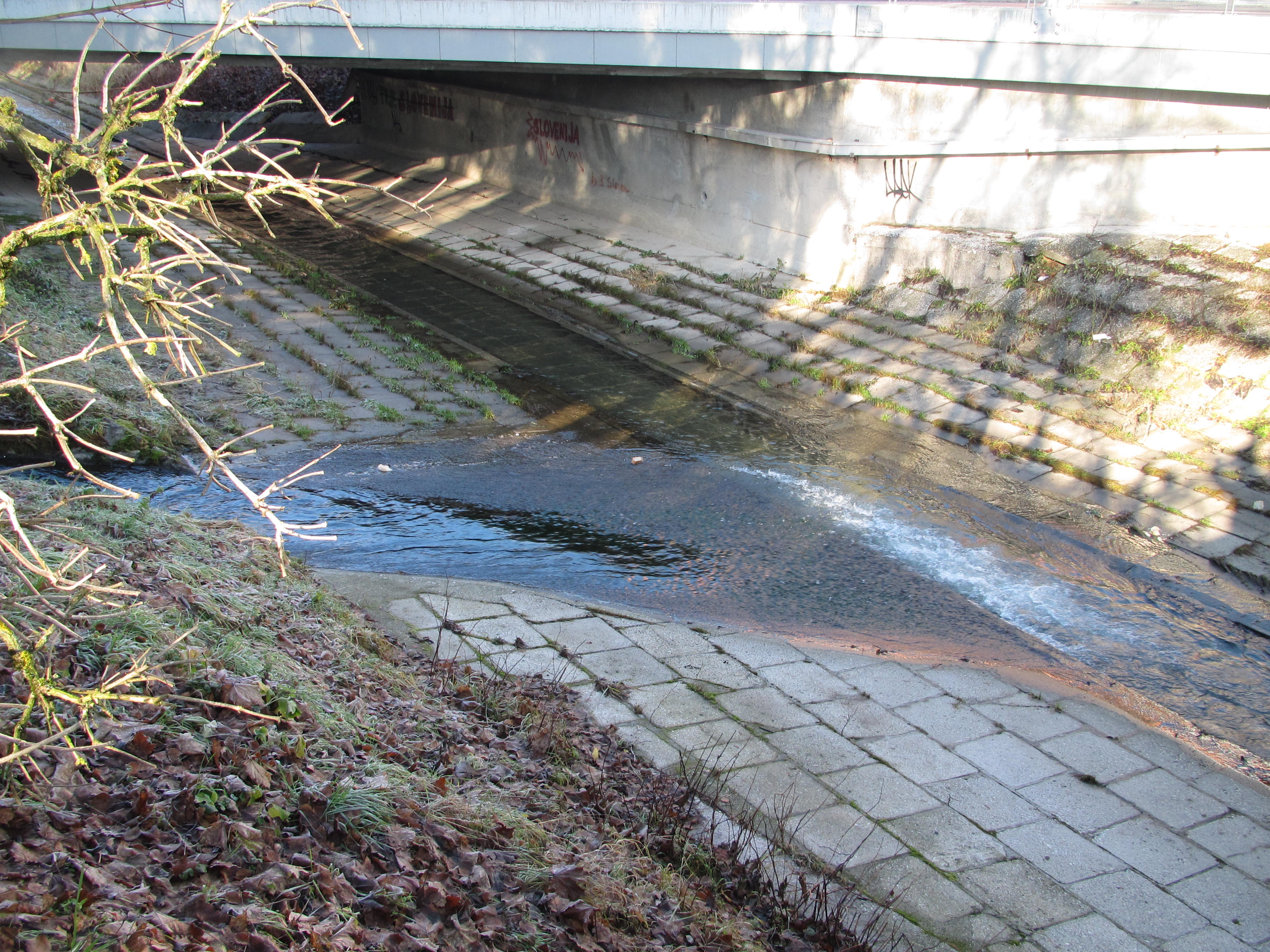
Confluence of the Gradaščica (left) with Glinščica Creek (right) in Vič

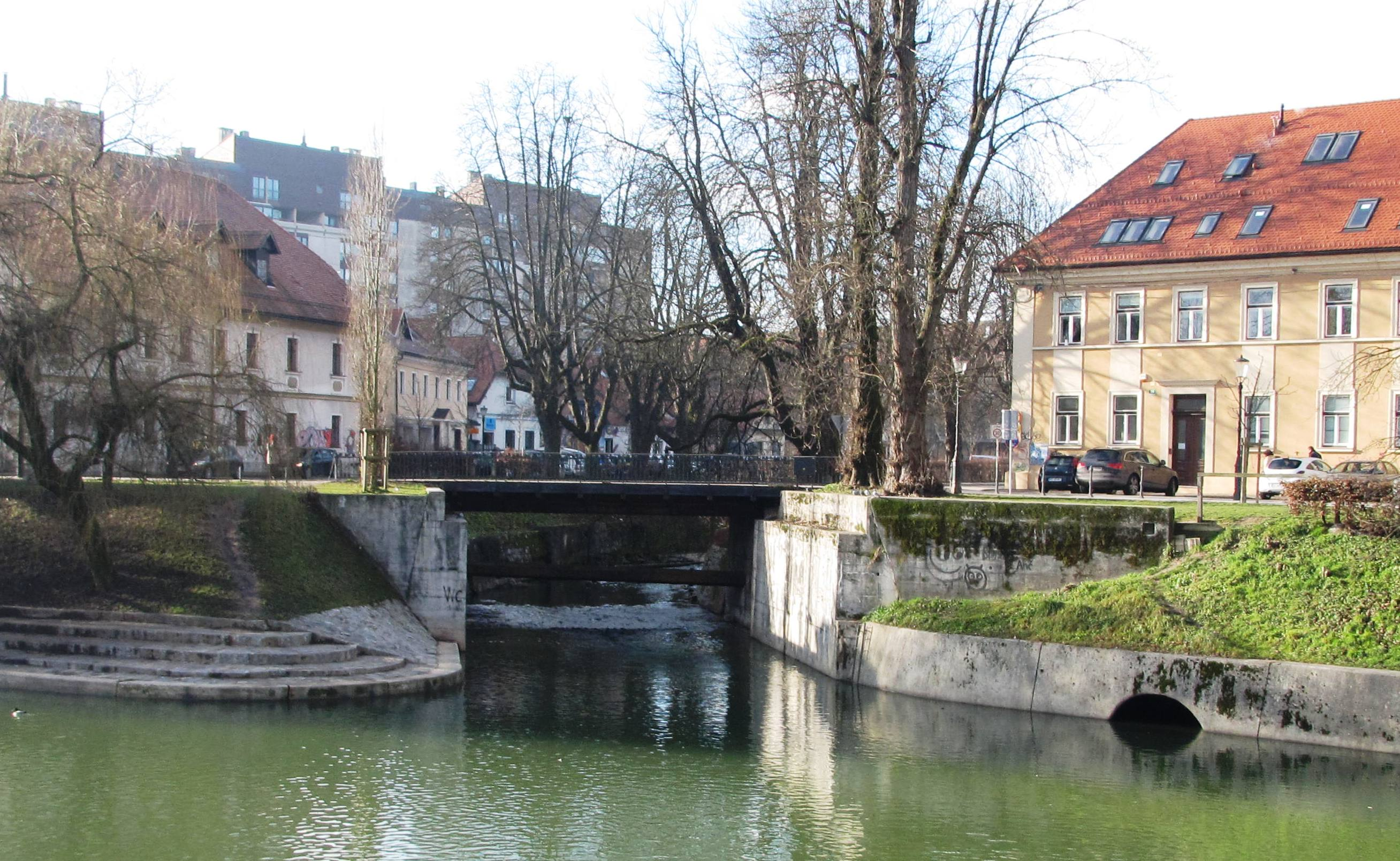
Confluence of the Gradaščica with the Ljubljanica River at the Jek Bridge

== Bridges ==
In the downstream order:

- Trnovo Bridge
- Rooster Bridge
- Jek Bridge
