= Ljubljana Zoo =

- The logo of Ljubljana Zoo

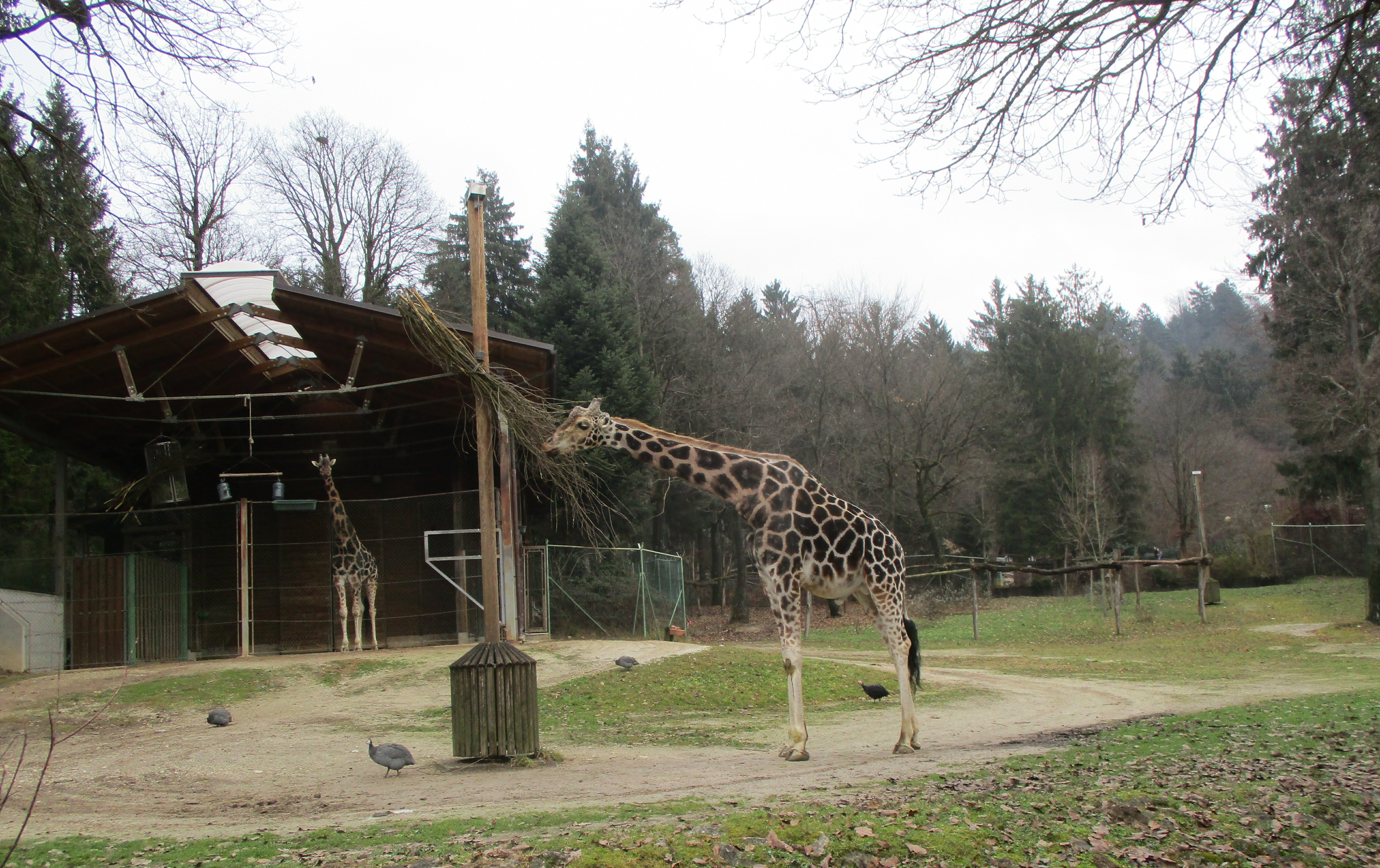
- Ljubljana Zoo
- Interactive map of Ljubljana Zoo
- 46°3′9.25″N 14°28′20.08″E
- Date opened: 10 March 1949
- Location: Ljubljana, Slovenia
- Land area: 19.6 hectares (48 acres)
- No. of animals: 500
- No. of species: 119
- Memberships: "European Association of Zoos and Aquaria". eaza.net. EAZA. "World Association of Zoos and Aquaria". waza.org. WAZA. Species360
- Website: www.zoo-ljubljana.si

Ljubljana Zoo (Slovene: Živalski vrt Ljubljana) is a 19.6-hectare (48-acre) zoo in Ljubljana, Slovenia. It serves as the national zoo of Slovenia and is open year-round. The zoo has 119 species and (not counting insects) a total of 500 animals.

== History ==
Ljubljana Zoo was established on 10 March 1949 by the city board of Ljubljana. It was at first hosted in the Center District and moved to its current location in 1951.

In 2008 a complete renovation of the zoo that would be completed by 2016 was announced. In 2009 a new colony of saimiri arrived in their new enclosure. The same year new alpacas and red pandas arrived. In late 2009, construction of a new sealion enclosure began and as of 2013 the zoo hosts three California sea lions. In 2010, both Siberian tigers died of old age. Since 1996, it also hosted two lions (Panthera leo), a male and a female, from Karlsruhe Zoo. The male died after an orthopedic operation in 2011 and the female died due to cancer in 2013.

In 2011 a new enclosure was built to host four raccoons. The zoo also received a new pair of lynxes. In 2012 a pair of Siberian cranes arrived and in the other part of zoo 40 greater flamingo were placed. In 2013 the zoo received the first pair of cheetahs in its history. It came from Borås djurpark in Sweden and has been placed in the former Siberian tiger enclosure, which has been redesigned. It has also been announced that a new pair of Siberian tigers would arrive in the end of August 2017.

== Gallery ==
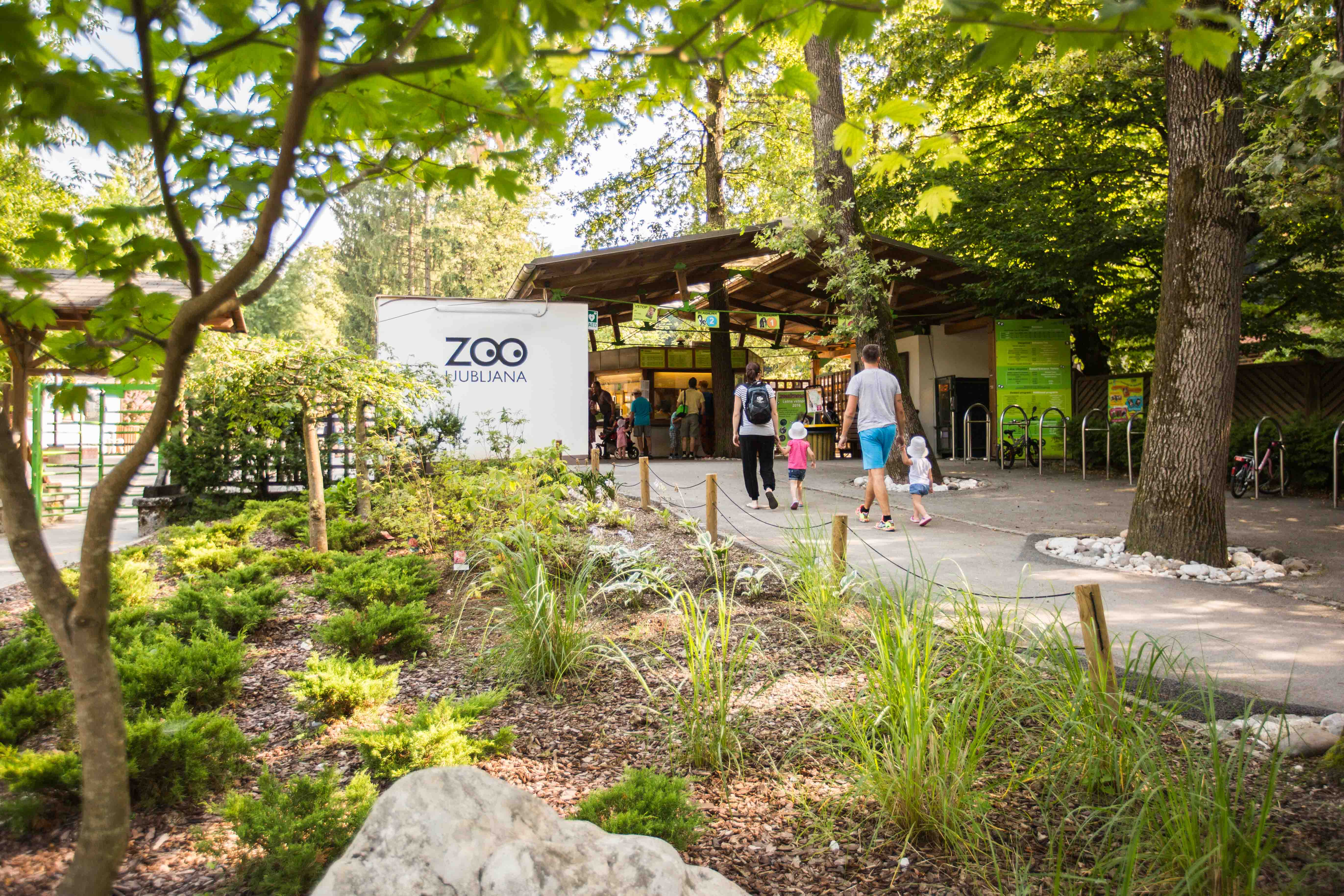
Entrance to the zoo

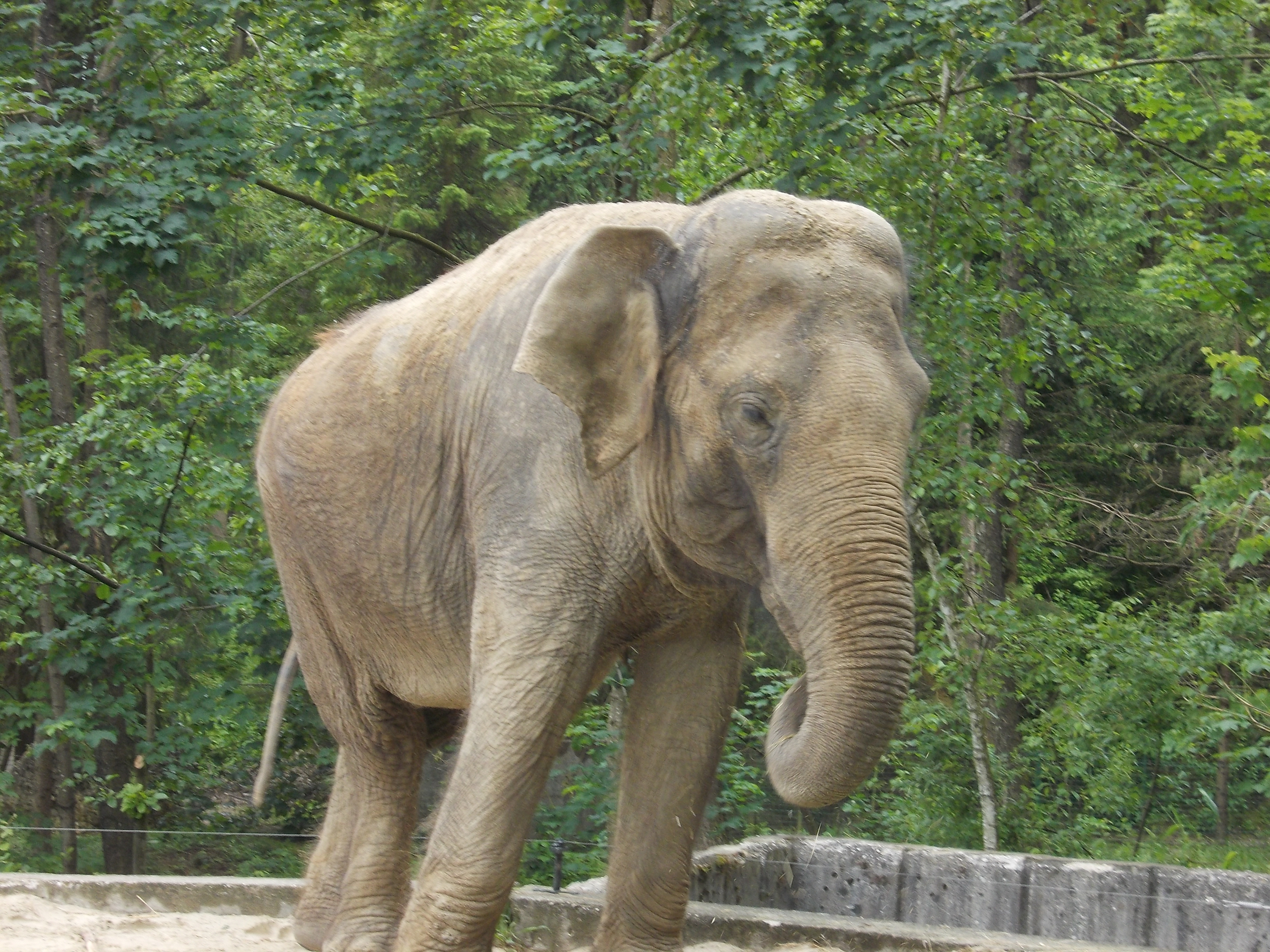
Indian elephant named Ganga

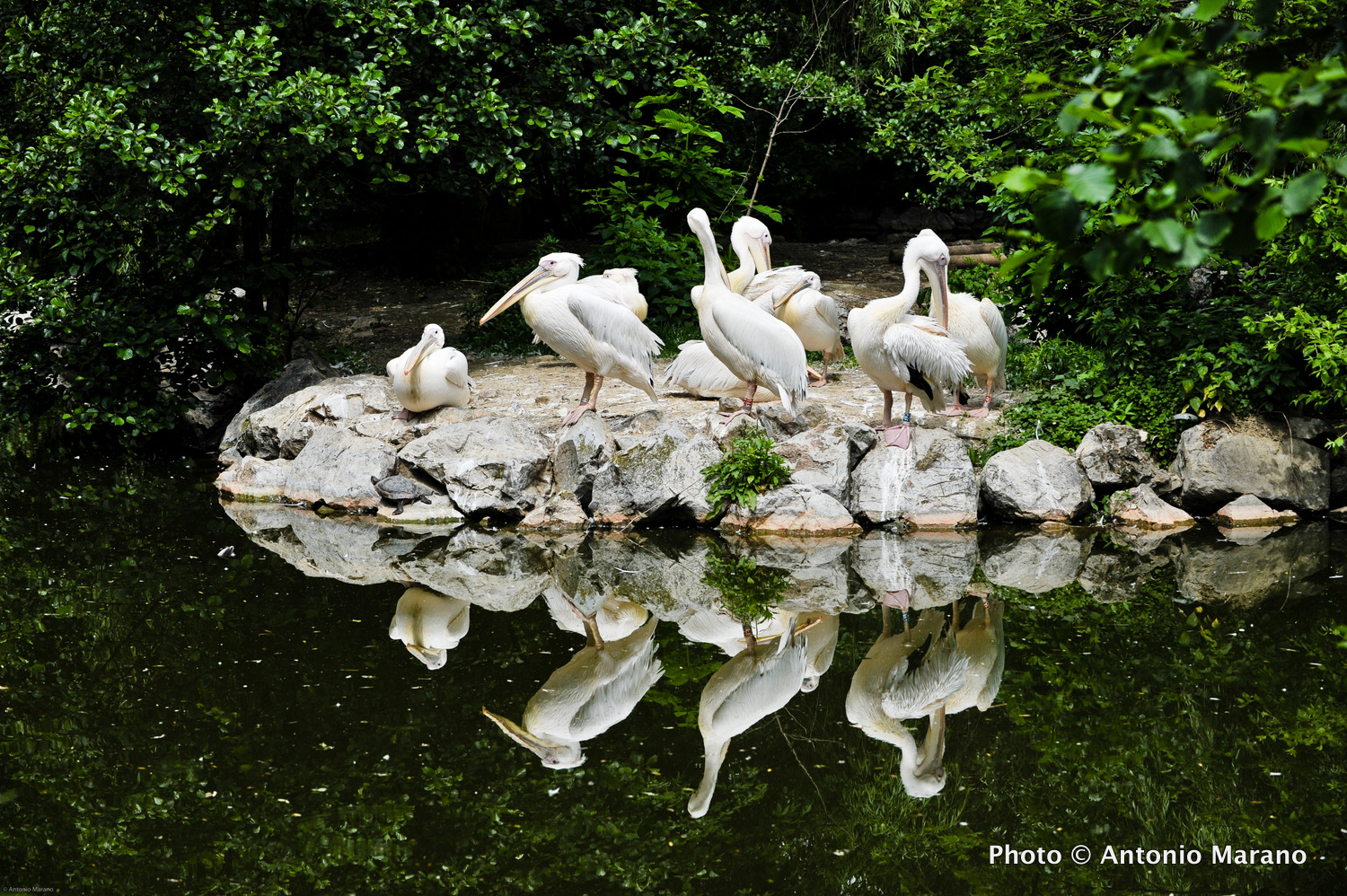
Great white pelicans

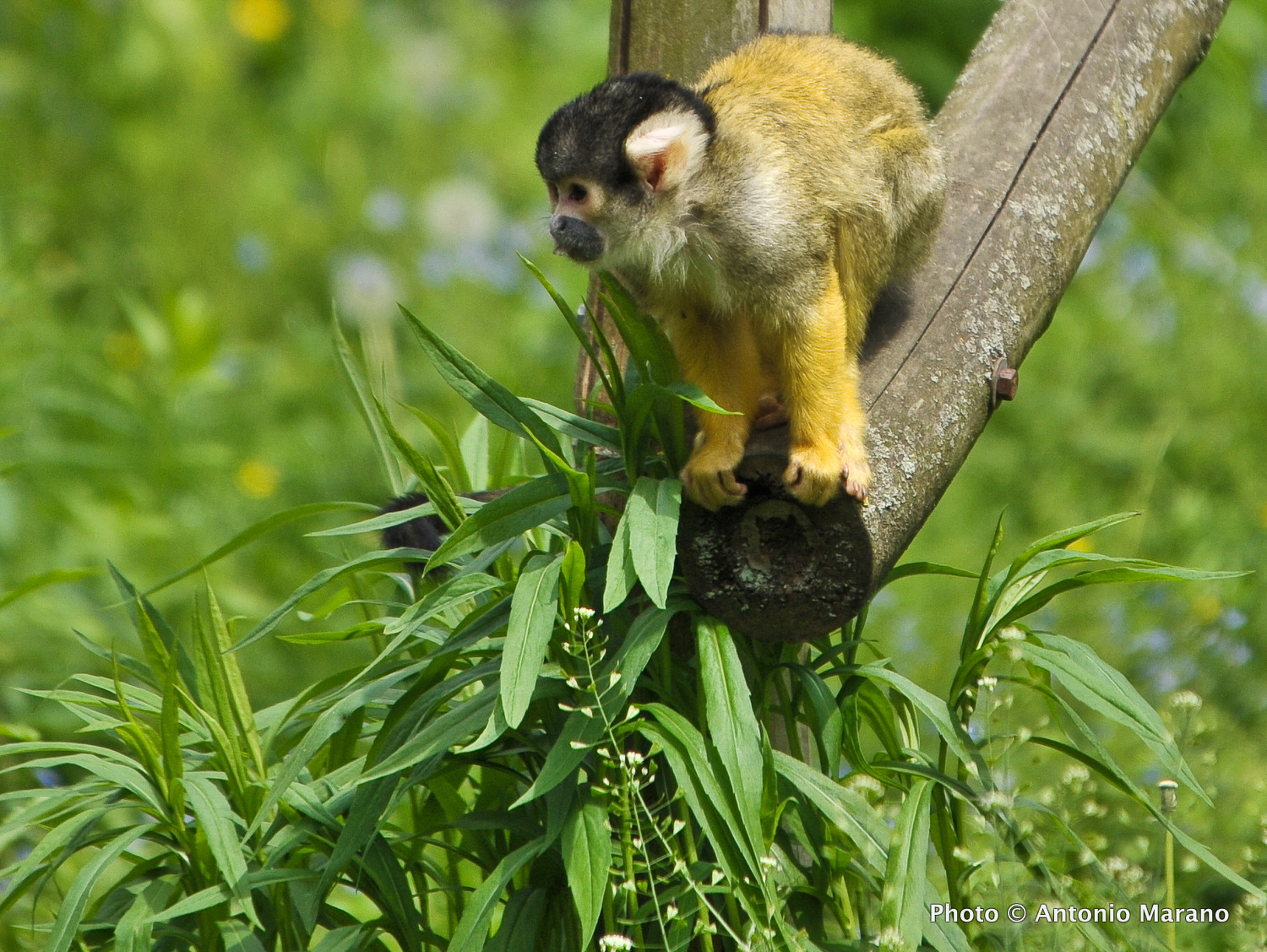
Black-capped squirrel monkey

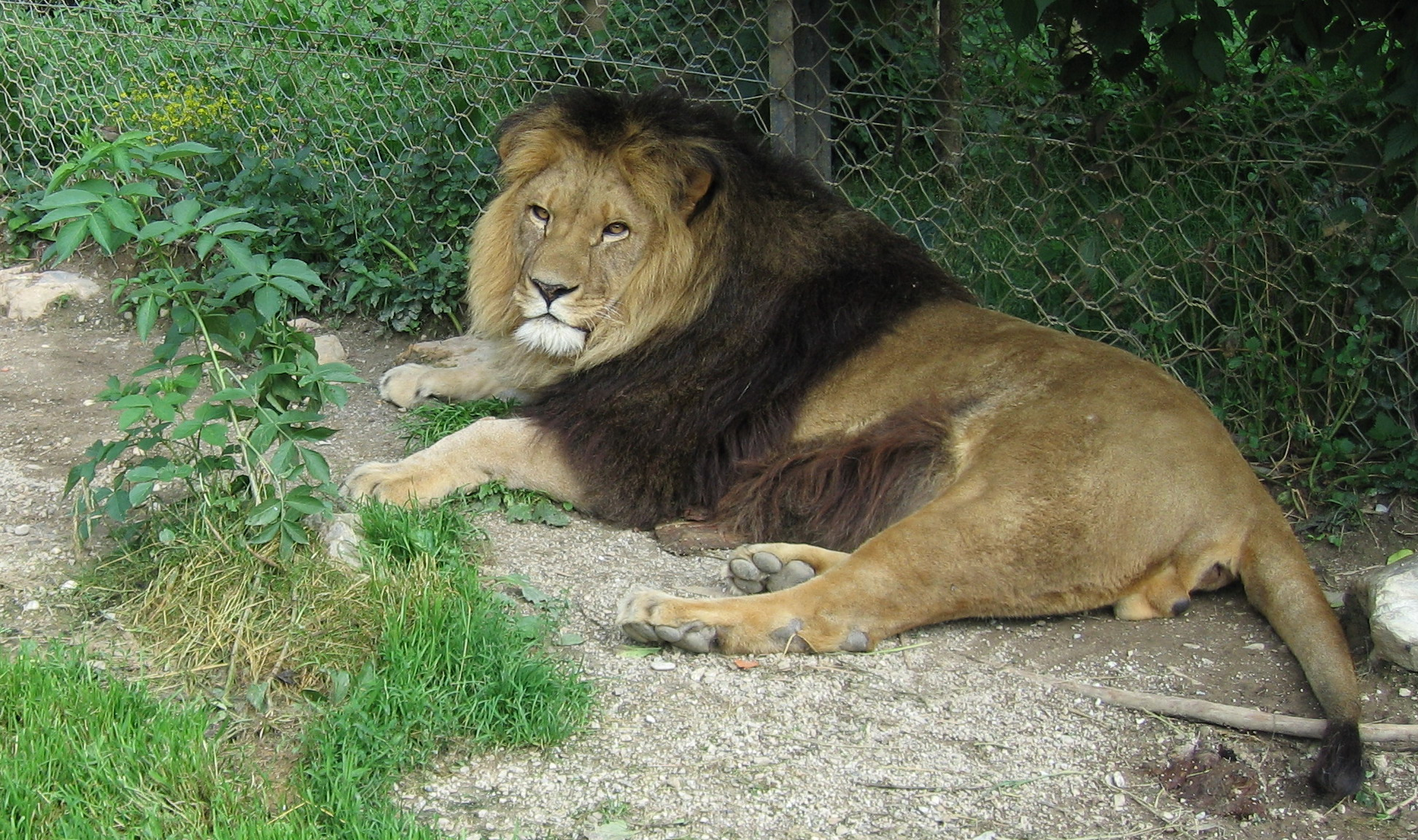
A lion, possibly a Barbary lion

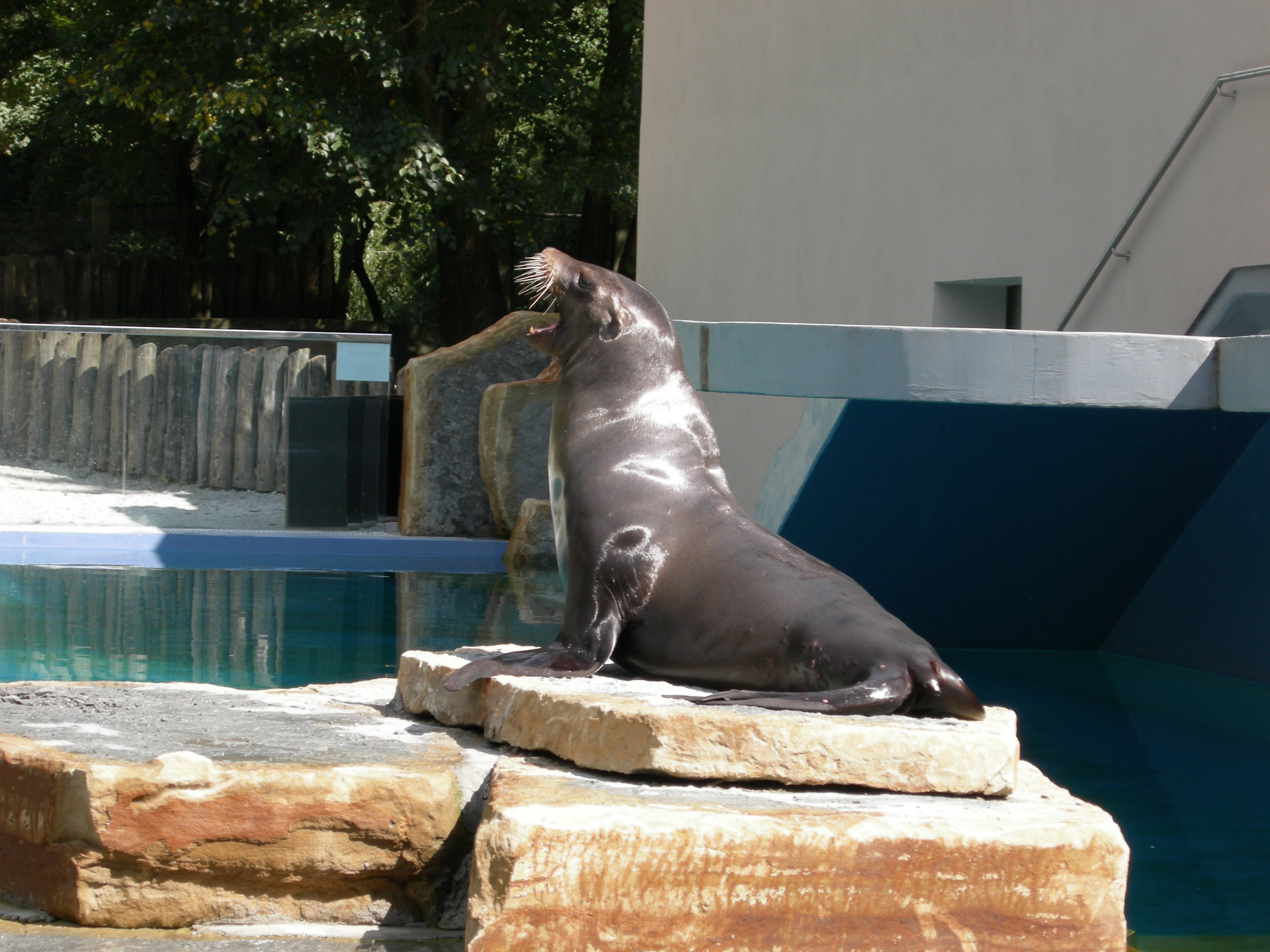
California sea lion
