= Trnovo District =

Coordinates: 46°02′21″N 14°30′17″E

- District
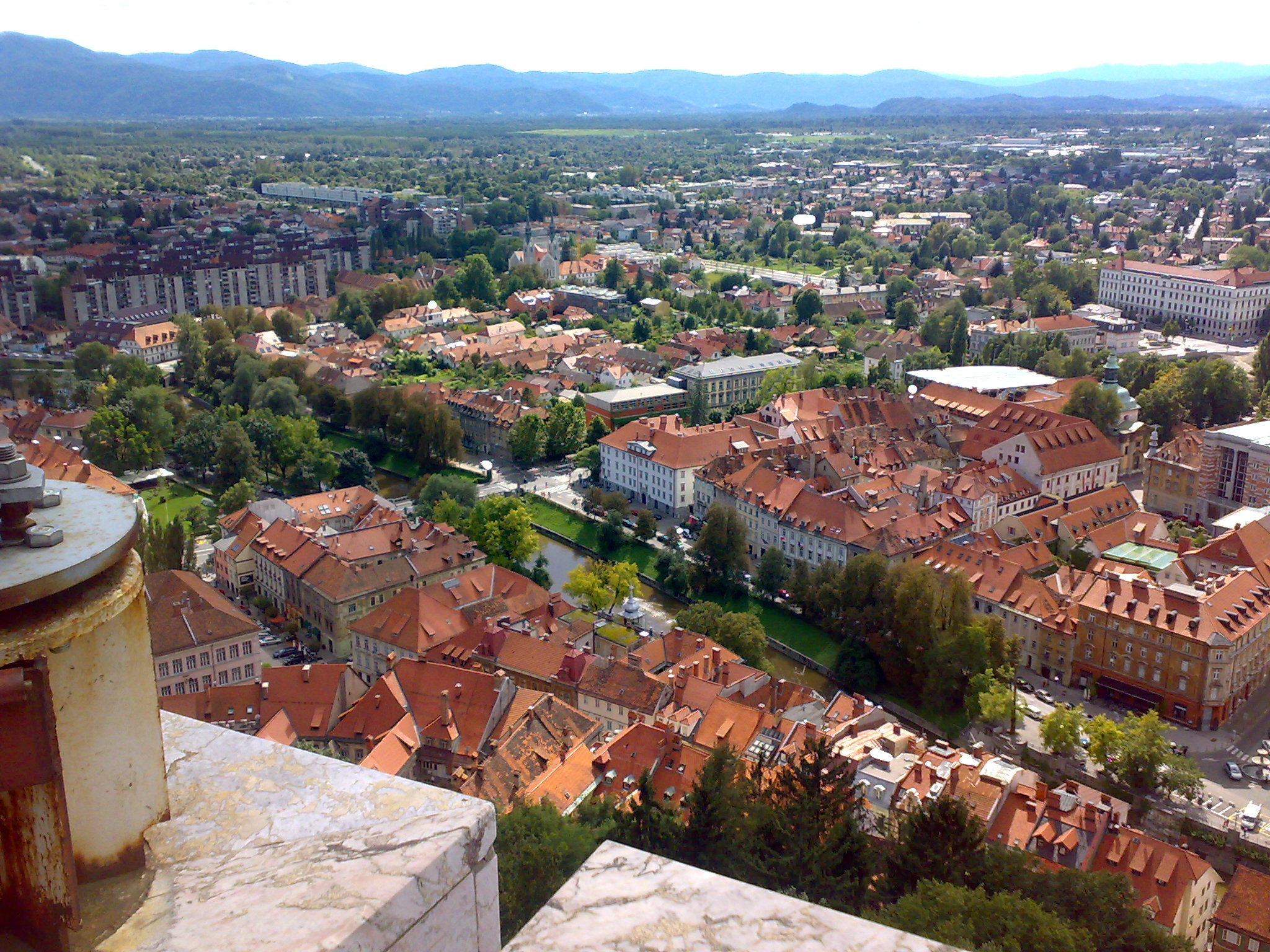
- View from Ljubljana Castle

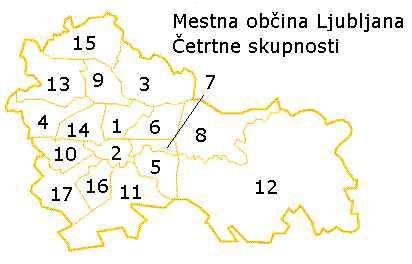
- Map of districts in Ljubljana. The Trnovo district is number 16.
- Country: Slovenia
- Region: Central Slovenia
- City: Ljubljana

Area
  - Total: 7.2 km^{2} (2.8 sq mi)

Population
  - Total: 14,475
  - Density: 2,000/km^{2} (5,200/sq mi)
- Time zone: UTC+1 (CET)
  - Summer (DST): UTC+2 (CEST)

The Trnovo District (Slovene: Četrtna skupnost Trnovo), or simply Trnovo, is a district (mestna četrt) of the City Municipality of Ljubljana, the capital of Slovenia.
