= Bokalce Castle =

Coordinates: 46°2′53.2″N 14°26′40.63″E

- Grad Bokalce
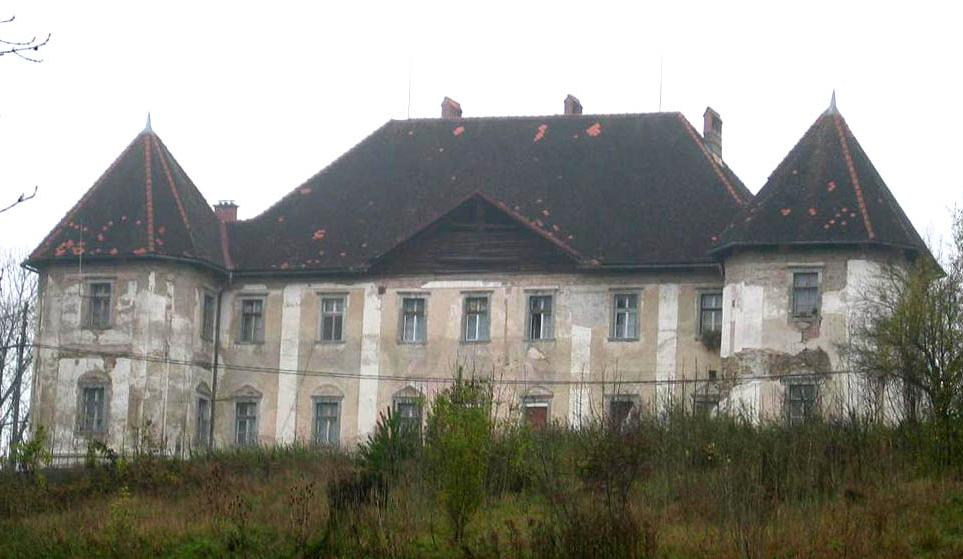
- Main facade of the Bokalce Castle

General information
- Address: Cesta na Bokalce 32, Ljubljana
- Town or city: Ljubljana
- Elevation: 312 m
- Completed: 2nd half of the 17th century

Technical details
- Floor area: 701.89 m²

Bokalce Castle (Slovene: Grad Bokalce,Slovene pronunciation: [bɔˈkaːu̯tsɛ] German: Strobelhof) is a castle or mansion in Ljubljana, the capital of Slovenia. It stands at 312m above sea level.

== Name ==
The estate was attested in written sources in 1548 as Wokhauez (and as Bokaliz in 1580, and Wokhalez in 1697). The modern Slovene name (a feminine plural) was originally an accusative plural form of the surname Bokal. The origin of the surname is unknown. It could be the result of metathesis of the surname Kobal, derived from Italian Cavallo. It is also possible, but unlikely, that the name is derived from Slovene bok 'protected place, end of a hill, sharp slope', referring to the edge of Utik Hill. In the past the German name was Strobelhof, based on the name of the family that acquired the castle in the second half of the 17th century.

== History ==
The castle stands next to the Ljubljana ring road, next to the Gradaščica River. As early as the 12th century, the site was occupied by a fortification belonging to the noble Eghk family. From 1580 to the first half of the 17th century, the castle was owned by the Diennersberg family; from 1705 to 1809, both it and the surrounding estate belonged to the counts Lamberg.

In that year, Janez Nepomuk Lamberg divided the estate, selling one half to Sigmund Pagliaruzzi. The other half, including the castle itself, remained a Lamberg holding until 1817, when it was sold to Jožef Seunig. In 1899 the estate was reunited. As foreign-held property, the provisional government of Yugoslavia declared sequestration of the estate in 1919, lasting until 1924. After World War II, the castle was nationalized. It is currently rather badly decayed, and serves as an apartment building.
